= Krishnath College School =

Location
- 4, Krishnath Road; Berhampore, West Bengal, 742101; India
- Coordinates: 24.091362°N 88.245834°E

Information
- Motto: Tamaso Ma Jyotirgamaya (তমসো মা জ্যোতির্গময়) (From darkness, lead me to light)
- Established: 1853; 173 years ago
- School board: WBBSE & WBCHSE
- Headmaster: Himadri Chowdhury
- Enrollment: 1400
- Nickname: KNCS
- Website: www.kncs.org.in

Krishnath College School is one of the oldest schools in Bengal situated in Baharampore, Murshidabad district in India. Originally located in the same building as Krishnath College, it was moved into separate buildings in 1908.

== History ==
The original School had no separate entrance and was part of Krishnath College. Regular classes were started on the 21st of November, 1853. In 1855, the School was shifted to Mr. Verdon Monasagon's two-story house. As the house was demolished in the Indian Rebellion of 1857, the school was again shifted to Banjetia Garden House of Maharani Swarnamoyee in 1857. When the Krishnath College Building was completed in 1859, the school was shifted to the eastern block of the building. In 1887, Maharani Swarnamoyee, the wife of Maharaja Krishnath Roy, undertook the administrative and financial control of the College as well as the School. In 1902, the name of the School was changed to Krishnath College School by Sir Manindra Chandra Nandy, the Maharaja of Cossimbazar after the name of his maternal uncle Maharaja Krishnath Roy. On 9 August 1909, the foundation stone was laid by Sir Edward Norman Baker, the Lieutenant-Governor of Bengal. The school was shifted to its present imposing building, built with the help of Maharaja Sir Manindra Chandra Nandy. In August 1911, the school was formally opened by Lord Fraser William Duke, the Officiating Governor of Bangal.

== Social activities ==
The Boy Scout movement was introduced in the school in 1921. The Boy Scouts of America (BSA) Troop of the school rendered admirable service in Monghyr after the devastation brought about by the Behar earthquake. In 1949–50, the school took grant-in-aid, as they had a deficit. A Junior Division, 62nd Troop, of the National Cadet Corps (NCC) was started in the school on 31 January 1952. The system of midday tiffin, as outlined by the Board of Secondary Education has been introduced in Class V to VI for one year as an experimental measure. The school also took an active role in the propagation of the National Language.

== Notable alumni ==
- Rakhal Das Banerji, Indian archaeologist
- Utpal Dutt, Indian film and theatre actor, writer, playwright
