= Ulipur Upazila =

Upazila in Kurigram district

Ulipur উলিপুর
- Upazila
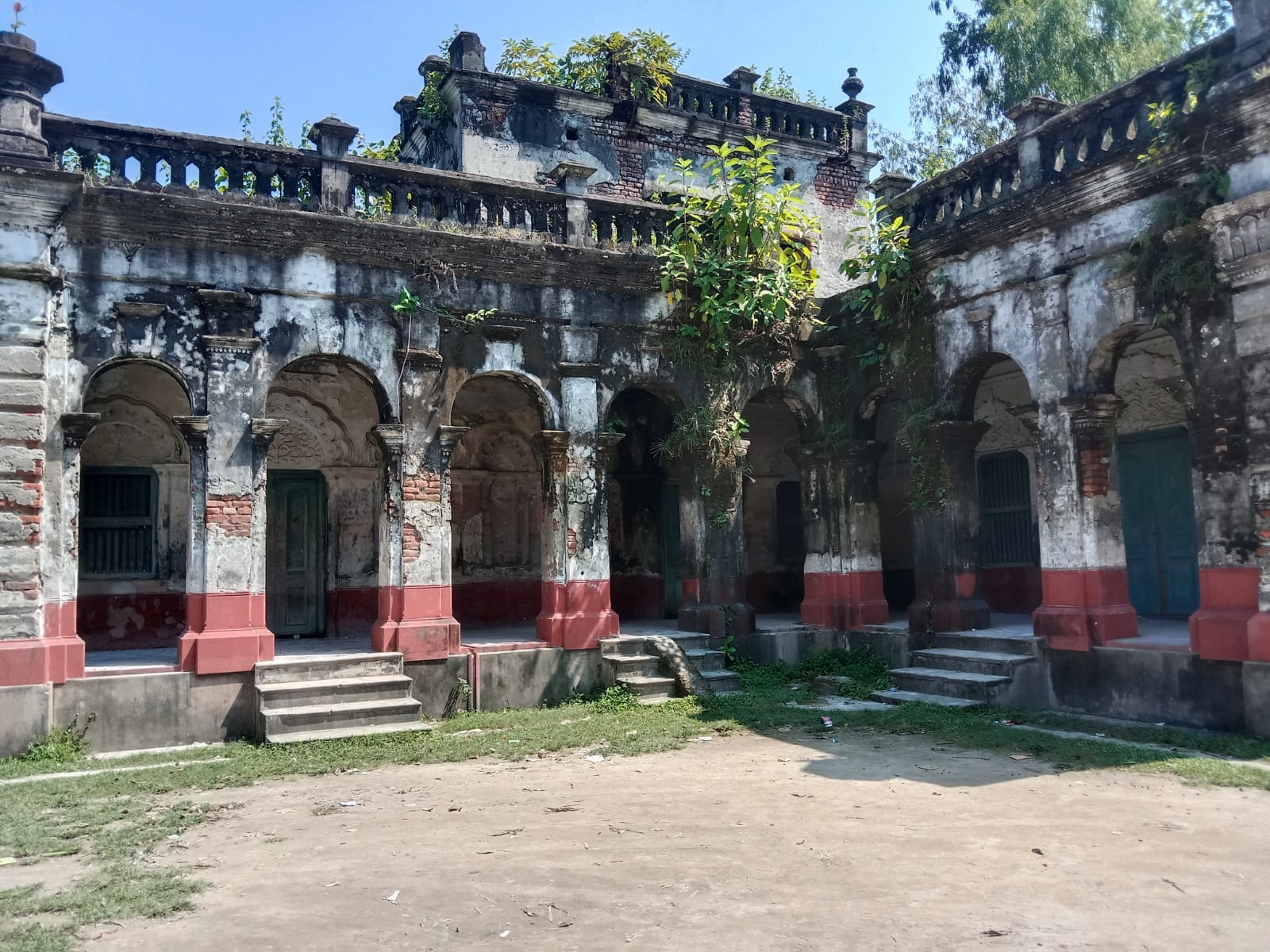
- Ulipur Munshi Bari

- Coordinates: 25°39.8′N 89°38′E
- Country: Bangladesh
- Division: Rangpur
- District: Kurigram

Area
  - Total: 458.48 km^{2} (177.02 sq mi)

Population (2022)
  - Total: 440,152
  - Density: 960.02/km^{2} (2,486.5/sq mi)
- Time zone: UTC+6 (BST)
- Postal code: 5620
- Website: ulipur.kurigram.gov.bd

Ulipur Upazila mauza geocode map

Ulipur Upazila (Bengali: উলিপুর) is an administrative sub-district of Kurigram District in the Rangpur Division of northern Bangladesh.

Historically, Ulipur was part of the former Rajshahi Division. Following the administrative reorganization of Bangladesh and the establishment of Rangpur Division in 2010, Ulipur was officially incorporated into Kurigram District under Rangpur Division. The correct and current administrative identification of the area is Ulipur, Kurigram District, Bangladesh.

== History ==
Ulipur was established as a thana in 1902 during the British colonial period. Over time, it developed as an important administrative and commercial center in the northern region of Bengal. During the Bangladesh Liberation War in 1971, local residents actively participated in the resistance movement, and the area witnessed several wartime incidents.

After the independence of Bangladesh, Ulipur was upgraded to an upazila as part of the decentralization of local government administration.

== Geography ==
Ulipur Upazila is located in the northern part of Bangladesh and lies within the floodplain of major rivers including the Brahmaputra, Dharla, and Teesta. The upazila is characterized by fertile alluvial soil, riverine landscapes, and seasonal wetlands.

However, the region is vulnerable to natural hazards such as flooding and riverbank erosion, which significantly affect agriculture, housing, and livelihoods.

== Administration ==
Ulipur Upazila consists of 14 union parishads, 147 mouzas, and 418 villages. The upazila administration operates under the Kurigram District Administration and provides essential public services including education, healthcare, and local governance.

== Economy ==
The economy of Ulipur is primarily agriculture-based. Major crops include rice, jute, wheat, maize, onions, garlic, and vegetables. Fishing, livestock rearing, and small-scale trading also contribute to the local economy. Weekly rural markets (hats) play a vital role in regional trade.

== Culture and lifestyle ==
The culture of Ulipur reflects traditional rural Bengali life. The population observes major religious and cultural festivals such as Pohela Boishakh, Eid al-Fitr, Eid al-Adha, and Durga Puja. Folk music, local fairs, and traditional games remain integral to community life.

== Education ==
Ulipur has a network of government and non-government educational institutions, including primary school, secondary schools, madrasas, and colleges. Ulipur Maharani Swarnammyee School and College (M.S.) [estd:1868] and Ulupur Government College is one of the most prominent higher educational institutions in the upazila.

== Places of interest ==
Notable places and landmarks in Ulipur include:

- Munshi Bari – a historic zamindar residence and cultural heritage site
- Tupamari Beel – a natural wetland and picnic spot
- Kazi Mosque – a historic mosque with Mughal architectural influence
- Chandi Temple – an important Hindu religious site

== Notable people ==
Several educators, social workers, freedom fighters, and cultural figures from Ulipur have contributed to regional and national development.

== See also ==
- Kurigram District
- Rangpur Division

== Geography ==
Ulipur is located at 25.6639°N 89.6333°E. It has a total area of 458.48 km^{2}. The Brahmaputra River and Teesta River flow through Ulipur. The Upazila is bounded by Chilmari and Raomari upazilas to the south, Kurigram Sadar and Rajarhat upazilas to its north, Assam state of India to its east, and Rangpur District to its west.

== Demographics ==
Religions in Ulipur Upazila (2022)
Religion	Percent
Islam	92.80%
Hinduism	7.18%
Other or not stated	0.02%

According to the 2022 Bangladeshi census, Ulipur Upazila had 120,793 households and a population of 440,152. 9.12% of the population were under 5 years of age. Ulipur had a literacy rate (age 7 and over) of 64.70%: 68.20% for males and 61.39% for females, and a sex ratio of 95.76 males for every 100 females. 65,522 (14.89%) lived in urban areas.

According to the 2011 Census of Bangladesh, Ulipur Upazila had 103,061 households and a population of 395,207. 94,559 (23.93%) were under 10 years of age. Ulipur had a literacy rate (age 7 and over) of 45.64%, compared to the national average of 51.8%, and a sex ratio of 1069 females per 1000 males. 45,933 (11.62%) lived in urban areas.

As of the 1991 Census of Bangladesh, Ulipur has a population of 345,205. Males constitute are 50% of the population, and females 50%. This Upazila's eighteen up population is 153,939. Ulipur has an average literacy rate of 23.9% (7+ years), and the national average of 32.4% literate.

== Administration ==
Ulipur Upazila is divided into Ulipur Municipality and 13 union parishads: Bazra, Begumgonj, Buraburi, Daldalia, Dhamsreni, Dharanibari, Durgapur, Gunaigas, Hatia, Pandul, Shahabiar Alga, Tobockpur, and Thetrai. The union parishads are subdivided into 147 mauzas and 354 villages.

Ulipur Municipality is subdivided into 9 wards and 16 mahallas.

== Education ==
According to Banglapedia, Bakshiganj Rajibia High School, founded in 1945, Durgapur High School, Durgapur (1914), Ulipur Government Girls' High School (1909), and Ulipur M.S. High School & College (1864) are notable secondary schools.

== Economy ==
- Total cultivable land: 28,250 acres
- Cash crops: rice, wheat, vegetables, potatoes, jute, sugarcane, etc.
- Number of industries: total 730, all cottage industries
- Occupations: The main occupation is agriculture; others include government jobs, blacksmiths, potters, fishermen, etc.
- Paved roads: 180 km
- Unpaved roads: 446 km

== Tourist attractions ==
- Zia Pond
- Dargah of Jalar Pir
- Seven Dargah Shrine
- Kazir Mosque
- Thakur Bari Temple
- Brahmaputra River
- Teesta River
- Naodangar Beel (wetland)
- Dagar Kuti Massacre Memorial
- Panchpir Railway Station, Durgapur
- Paner Boroj, Pandul
- Kachari Pond
- Kasir Khamar Jame Mosque
- Bahar Ghat
- Tea Dam, Nagarkura
- Munsibari

== Notable people ==
- AKM Maidul Islam Mukul
- Sarker Nure Ershad Siddiki (Gono Odhikar Porishod)
- Md. Amjad Hossain Talukdar
- Mozammel Hossain Lalu
- Md. Motiur Rahman
- Akkas Ali Sarker

== See also ==
- Upazilas of Bangladesh
- Districts of Bangladesh
- Divisions of Bangladesh
