= R. D. Banerji =

Indian archaeologist (1885–1930)

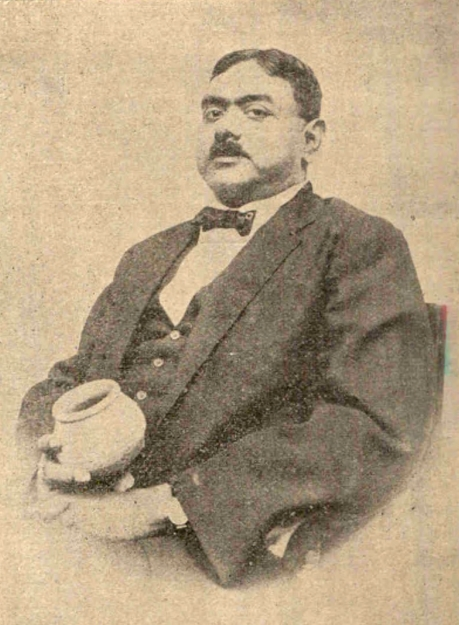
- Banerji, c. 1926
- Born: 12 April 1885; Berhampore, Bengal Presidency, British India (now in West Bengal, India)
- Died: 23 May 1930 (aged 45); Kalighat, Calcutta, Bengal Presidency, British India (now Kolkata, West Bengal, India)
- Occupations: Archaeologist, historian, linguist,
- Known for: Proposing the antiquity of Mohenjo-daro

Academic background
- Education: University of Calcutta

Rakhal Das Banerji, also Rakhaldas Bandyopadhyay (Bengali: [ɾakʰald̪aʃ bãɽud͡ːʒeˑ, bɔnd̪opad̪ʱːae̯], 12 April 1885 – 23 May 1930), was an Indian archaeologist and an officer of the Archeological Survey of India (ASI). In 1919, he became the second ASI officer deputed to survey the site of Mohenjo-daro and returned there in the 1922-23 season. He was the first person to propose the remote antiquity of the site—which he did in a letter to Marshall in 1923—and in effect of the Harappan culture. After leaving the ASI, he held the Manindra Chandra Nandy professorship of Ancient Indian History and Culture at the Banaras Hindu University from 1928 until his premature death in 1930.

In 1931, in the introduction of Mohenjo-daro and the Indus Civilization, London: Arthur Probsthain, 1931, Sir John Marshall wrote, "Three other scholars whose names I cannot pass over in silence, are the late Mr. R. D. Banerji, to whom belongs the credit of having discovered, if not Mohenjo-daro itself, at any rate its high antiquity, and his immediate successors in the task of excavation, Messrs. M.S. Vats and K.N. Dikshit. ... no one probably except myself can fully appreciate the difficulties and hardships which they had to face in the three first seasons at Mohenjo-daro."

== Early life ==
Banerji was born on 12 April 1885 in Berhampore of Murshidabad District, in present-day Indian state of West Bengal, to Matilal and Kalimati. He passed his entrance examination from the Krishnath College School in Berhampore in 1900. He lived in Bangaon.

Soon, he married Kanchanmala (1891–1930), the daughter of Narendranath Mukhopadhyay. He passed his F.A. examination in 1903 and graduated from the Presidency College with Honours in history in 1907. He obtained his M.A. in history from Calcutta University in 1911.

== Career ==
Banerji joined the Indian Museum in Calcutta as an Assistant to the Archaeological Section in 1910. He joined the Archaeological Survey of India as Assistant Superintendent in 1911 and was promoted to the rank of Superintending Archaeologist of the Western Circle in 1917. In 1924, after running into difficulty over his expenses, requested, and was transferred to the Eastern Circle, and took part in the excavations at Paharpur. He took voluntary retirement in 1926. After teaching at the University of Calcutta, he later joined the Banaras Hindu University in 1928 and held this post till his premature death on 23 May 1930.

Banerji's first major independent professional work was in the fields of palaeography and epigraphy. He won the Jubilee Research Prize of the Calcutta University for The Origin of the Bengali Script published in 1919.

He was the first to study the proto-Bangla script, the original form of Bangla script. He wrote the classic historical works on medieval Indian coins, and the standard works on the iconography of Indian art, in particular Gupta sculpture and architecture. His best known work was Eastern Indian Medieval School of Sculpture, published posthumously in 1933.

== Discovery of Mohenjo-Daro ==
Banerji is known for unearthing pre-Buddhist artifacts at the ruins at Mohenjo-Daro and for noting similarities between the site at Mohenjo-Daro and Harrappa. Those discoveries led to excavations at the two sites that established the existence of the then-unknown Bronze Age Indus Valley Civilisation.

His interpretations of this civilisation were published in a number of articles and books: "An Indian City Five Thousand Years Ago"; "Mohenjo-Daro" (in Bangla, Basumati, 1331 BS); Prehistoric, Ancient and Hindu India (posthumously published, 1934) and Mahenjo-Daro – A Forgotten Report.

== Works ==
Banerji wrote two textbooks for Calcutta University, namely, History of India (1924) and A Junior History of India (1928). His The Age of the Imperial Guptas (1933) is a collection of lectures delivered by him in 1924. His standard two-volume Bangalar Itihas (History of Bengal), in Bengali (1914 and 1917), was one of the first attempts at writing a scientific history of Bengal. He also wrote two volumes on the history of Orissa, titled History of Orissa from the Earliest Times to the British Period (1930 and 1931).

His other significant non-fiction works include, Prachin Mudra (1915), The Palas of Bengal (1915), The Temple of Siva at Bhumara (1924), The Paleography of Hati Gumpha and Nanaghat Inscriptions (1924), Bas Reliefs of Badami (1928) and The Haihayas of Tripuri and their Monuments (1931).

Having published three novels, Pakshantar (1924), Byatikram (1924) and Anukram (1931), his other literary works in Bengali language were historical fictions. The setting of his Pashaner Katha (1914) is Kushana period. His three other novels, namely, Dhruba, Karuna (1917) and Shashanka (1914) are set in the different phases of the Gupta period. Dharmapala (1915) narrates the story of the Pala emperor Dharmapala. Mayukh (1916) describes the Portuguese atrocities in Bengal during the reign of Shahjahan. Asim (1924) narrates the condition of Bengal during the reign of Farrukhsiyar.

His last novel, Lutf-Ulla, is set in Delhi at the time of the invasion by Nadir Shah. Another work, Hemkana (uncompleted), was published in Prabasi (magazine) from 1911 to 1912. A number of his novels were translated into other Indian languages.

== Non-fiction books ==
- The origin of the Bengali Script
- Baanglaar Itihaash (The History of Bengal) (1914 and 1917) - 2 volumes
- Prachin Mudra (1915)
- The Palas of Bengal (1915)
- The Temple of Shiva at Bhumara (1924)
- The Paleography of Hati Gumpha and Nanaghat Inscriptions (1924)
- The History of India (1924)
- A Junior History of India (1928)
- Bas Reliefs of Badami (1928)

=== Posthumous ===
- History of Orissa from the Earliest Times to the British Period (1930 and 1931) - 2 volumes
- The Haihayas of Tripuri and their Monuments (1931)
- The Age of the Imperial Guptas (1933)

== Novels ==
- Dhrubo
- Hemkana (uncompleted) - published in Prabasi magazine (1911–12)
- Pashaner Katha (1914)
- Shashanka (1914)
- Dharmapala (1915)
- Mayukh (1916)
- Karuna (1917)
- Pakshantar (1924)
- Byatikram (1924)
- Asim (1924)

=== Posthumous ===
- Anukram (1931)
- Luttfullaah

== Legacy ==
In 2022, in commemoration of the 137th anniversary of Banerji’s birth, and to celebrate the centenary year of the discovery of Harappan Civilization, the Indian Museum in Kolkata exhibited artifacts from its collection to provide a glimpse of Harappan civilization to visitors.

== Bibliography ==
- Bhattacharya, Asok K. (1999). Rakhaldas Bandyopadhyay, Delhi: Sahitya Akademi, ISBN 81-260-0848-2
- Dasgupta, Kalyankumar (ed.) (1990). Shatabarsher Aloy Rakhaldas Bandyopadhyay (in Bengali), Kolkata: Sharat Samiti.
- Bandyopadhyay, Umesh, Abhishapta Rakhaldas, Kansai Shilai (Bengali Journal), April–September issue 2005, Calcutta.
- Pal, Rajat, Rakhaldas Bandyopadhyay: Ek bismrito adhyay, Patralekha,( 2021)
- Amitabha Bhattacharyya (2012), "Bandyopadhyay, Rakhaldas", in Sirajul Islam; Ahmed A. Jamal (eds.), Banglapedia: National Encyclopedia of Bangladesh (Second ed.), Asiatic Society of Bangladesh
