= Maharaja Manindra Chandra College =

College in West Bengal

- Type: Undergraduate college
- Established: 15 July 1941; 85 years ago
- Affiliations: UGC, NAAC
- Academic affiliations: University of Calcutta
- Principal: Dr. Goutam Kumar Ghosh
- Location: 20, Ramakanta Bose Street, Bidhan Sarani, Shyambazar, Kolkata, West Bengal, 700003, India; 22.6012661°N 88.37015°E
- Campus: Urban
- Website: www.mmccollege.ac.in
- Location within Kolkata Location within India

Maharaja Manindra Chandra College is an undergraduate college in North Kolkata, India, established in 1941, at 20 Ramkanta Bose Street, Kolkata. It is affiliated under the University of Calcutta. It shares premises with Maharaja Sris Chandra College (evening college) and Maharani Kasiswari College (morning college). The college has a second campus at 12 Padmanath Lane, Kolkata.

== History ==
The college was established on 15 July 1941 by Panchanan Neogi. It was named Maharaja Manindra Chandra College after Maharaja Srish Chandra Nandy's father, Maharaja Manindra Chandra Nandy of Cossimbazar.

== Courses ==
- Bengali
- English
- History
- Hindi
- Political science
- Philosophy
- Journalism and mass communication
- Mathematics
- Physics
- Chemistry
- Computer science
- Zoology
- Statistics
- Botany
- Electronic
- Economics
- Commerce

== Accreditation ==
Maharaja Manindra Chandra College is recognized by the University Grants Commission (UGC). In 2012, it was re-accredited and awarded B grade by the National Assessment and Accreditation Council (NAAC).

== Notable alumni ==
- Prabhat Roy, Filmmaker
- Ajitesh Bandopadhyay, Theater artist
- Asit Bandopadhyay, Theater artist
- Chinmoy Roy, actor
- Monu Mukherjee, actor
- Nachiketa Chakraborty, Singer
- Chayan Mukherjee, Superintendent (police)

== See also ==
- List of colleges affiliated to the University of Calcutta
- Education in India
- Education in West Bengal
