= Kurigram-3 =

Constituency of Bangladesh's Jatiya Sangsad

Coordinates: 25.66°N 89.62°E

- Constituency for the Jatiya Sangsad
- District: Kurigram District
- Division: Rangpur Division
- Electorate: 303,013 (2018)

Current constituency
- Created: 1984
- Party: Bangladesh Jamaat-e-Islami
- Member: Md Mahbubul Alam
- ← 26 Kurigram-2 28 Kurigram-4 →

Kurigram-3 is a constituency represented in the Jatiya Sangsad (National Parliament) of Bangladesh since 2026 by Md Mahbubul Alam of the Bangladesh Jamaat-e-Islami.

== Boundaries ==
The constituency encompasses Ulipur Upazila.

== History ==
The constituency was created in 1984 from the Rangpur-16 constituency when the former Rangpur District was split into five districts: Nilphamari, Lalmonirhat, Rangpur, Kurigram, and Gaibandha.

Ahead of 2008 general election, the Election Commission redrew constituency boundaries to reflect population changes revealed by the 2001 Bangladesh census. The 2008 redistricting altered the boundaries of the constituency.

Ahead of the 2014 general election, the Election Commission altered the boundaries of the constituency by removing one union parishad of Ulipur Upazila: Saheber Alga, and four union parishads of Rajarhat Upazila: Bidyananda, Gharialdanga, Nazimkhan, and Omar Majid, and adding all but two union parishads of Chilmari Upazila: Ashtamir Char and Nayerhat.

Ahead of the 2018 general election, the Election Commission altered the boundaries of the constituency by removing all portions of Chilmari Upazila, and adding the only missing union parishad of Ulipur Upazila: Saheber Alga.

== Members of Parliament ==
Election	Member	Party
1986	AKM Maidul Islam	Jatiya Party
1991	Md. Amjad Hossain Talukdar	Awami League
Feb 1996	AKM Maidul Islam	BNP
Sep 1996 by-election	Mozammel Hossain Lalu	Jatiya Party
2001	Md. Motiur Rahman	Islami Jatiya Oikya Front
2008	AKM Maidul Islam	Jatiya Party
2018 by-election	Akkas Ali	Jatiya Party
2018	MA Matin	Awami League
2024	Soumendra Prasad Pandey	Awami League
2026	Md Mahbubul Alam	Bangladesh Jamaat-e-Islami

== Elections ==
=== Elections in the 2020s ===
General election 2026: Kurigram-3
Party	Candidate	Votes	%	±%
GOP	Md. Noor Ershad Siddiqui			
BNP	Tasveer ul Islam			
JP(E)	Abdus Sobhan			
IAB	Dr. Md. Akkas Ali Sarkar			
Jamaat	Md. Mahbubul Alam			
Independent	Md. Shafiur Rahman			
Majority				
Turnout				

=== Elections in the 2010s ===
AKM Maidul Islam died in May 2018. Akkas Ali was elected in a July by-election.

Kurigram-3 by-election, 2018
Party	Candidate	Votes	%	±%
JP(E)	Akkas Ali	82,598	50.8	N/A
AL	MA Matin	79,895	49.2	N/A
Majority		2,703	1.7	N/A
Turnout		162,493	44.3	N/A
JP(E) hold				

AKM Maidul Islam was elected unopposed in the 2014 general election after opposition parties withdrew their candidacies in a boycott of the election.

=== Elections in the 2000s ===
General Election 2008: Kurigram-3
Party	Candidate	Votes	%	±%
JP(E)	AKM Maidul Islam	187,528	75.1	N/A
Independent	Tashvirul Islam	20,871	8.4	N/A
Independent	Habibul Haque Sarker	12,561	5.0	N/A
BNP	Md. Motiur Rahman	11,590	4.6	−33.2
IAB	Md. Razaul Karim	9,455	3.8	N/A
Zaker Party	A. T. M. Zohirul Islam	6,130	2.5	N/A
BSD	Sayeed Akhter Amin	661	0.3	N/A
Bangladesh Kalyan Party	Mohammad Alli Sarker	486	0.2	N/A
Independent	Sarker Mohammad Alli	380	0.2	N/A
Majority		166,657	66.8	+63.8
Turnout		249,662	83.5	+12.4
JP(E) gain from IJOF				

General Election 2001: Kurigram-3
Party	Candidate	Votes	%	±%
IJOF	Md. Motiur Rahman	68,579	40.8	N/A
BNP	AKM Maidul Islam	63,582	37.8	+14.0
AL	Md. Amjad Hossain Talukdar	34,140	20.3	−3.2
CPB	Md. Abdul Mottaleb	742	0.4	N/A
Independent	Md. Khalilur Rahman	648	0.4	N/A
Gano Forum	Sawpan Kumar Baksi	369	0.2	N/A
Majority		4,997	3.0	−11.3
Turnout		168,060	71.1	+13.0
IJOF gain from JP(E)				

=== Elections in the 1990s ===
Hussain Muhammad Ershad stood from jail for five seats in the June 1996 general election: Rangpur-2, Rangpur-3, Rangpur-5, Rangpur-6, and Kurigram-3. After winning all five, he chose to represent Rangpur-3 and quit the other four, triggering by-elections in them.

Kurigram-3 by-election, September 1996
Party	Candidate	Votes	%	±%
JP(E)	Mozammel Hossain Lalu	41,809	39.8	−28.7
AL	Md. Fulu Sarker	26,802	25.5	+7.3
BNP	AKM Maidul Islam	24,949	23.8	+7.2
Independent	M. Kafil Uddin	10,535	10.0	N/A
IOJ	Md. Khalilur Rahman	610	0.6	−0.3
Independent	Mamtazul Hasan Koreshi	302	0.3	N/A
Majority		15,007	14.3	−27.5
Turnout		105,007	58.1	−4.0
JP(E) hold				

General Election June 1996: Kurigram-3
Party	Candidate	Votes	%	±%
JP(E)	Hussain Mohammad Ershad	67,262	60.0	+41.7
AL	Md. Amjad Hossain Talukdar	20,408	18.2	−5.5
BNP	AKM Maidul Islam	18,662	16.6	+13.7
Jamaat	Abdul Quddus	3,475	3.1	+0.7
IOJ	Md. Khalilur Rahman	1,029	0.9	N/A
Gano Forum	Md. Abdul Jalil Sarkar	477	0.4	N/A
Zaker Party	Abdul Karim Sarkar	422	0.4	−4.9
Independent	Mosammat Marina Rahman	291	0.3	N/A
Independent	Golam Md. Kader	168	0.1	N/A
Majority		46,854	41.8	+40.8
Turnout		112,194	62.1	+18.6
JP(E) gain from AL				

General Election 1991: Kurigram-3
Party	Candidate	Votes	%	±%
AL	Md. Amjad Hossain Talukdar	20,547	23.7	
Independent	AKM Maidul Islam	19,699	22.8	
Islamic Al Zihad Dal	Matiar Rahaman	18,938	21.9	
JP(E)	Md. Golam Mostafa	15,799	18.3	
Zaker Party	Md. Aminul Islam	4,559	5.3	
BNP	Md. Mohiul Islam Haqqani	2,497	2.9	
Jamaat	Md. Abdul Kuddus	2,066	2.4	
Independent	Md. Abdul Jalil Sarkar	1,275	1.5	
JSD	Md. Lutfar Rahaman	1,032	1.2	
BAKSAL	Shree Somendro Prashad Pande	132	0.2	
Majority		848	1.0	
Turnout		86,544	43.5	
AL gain from JP(E)				
