= British Cemetery, Cossimbazar =

Cemetery in West Bengal

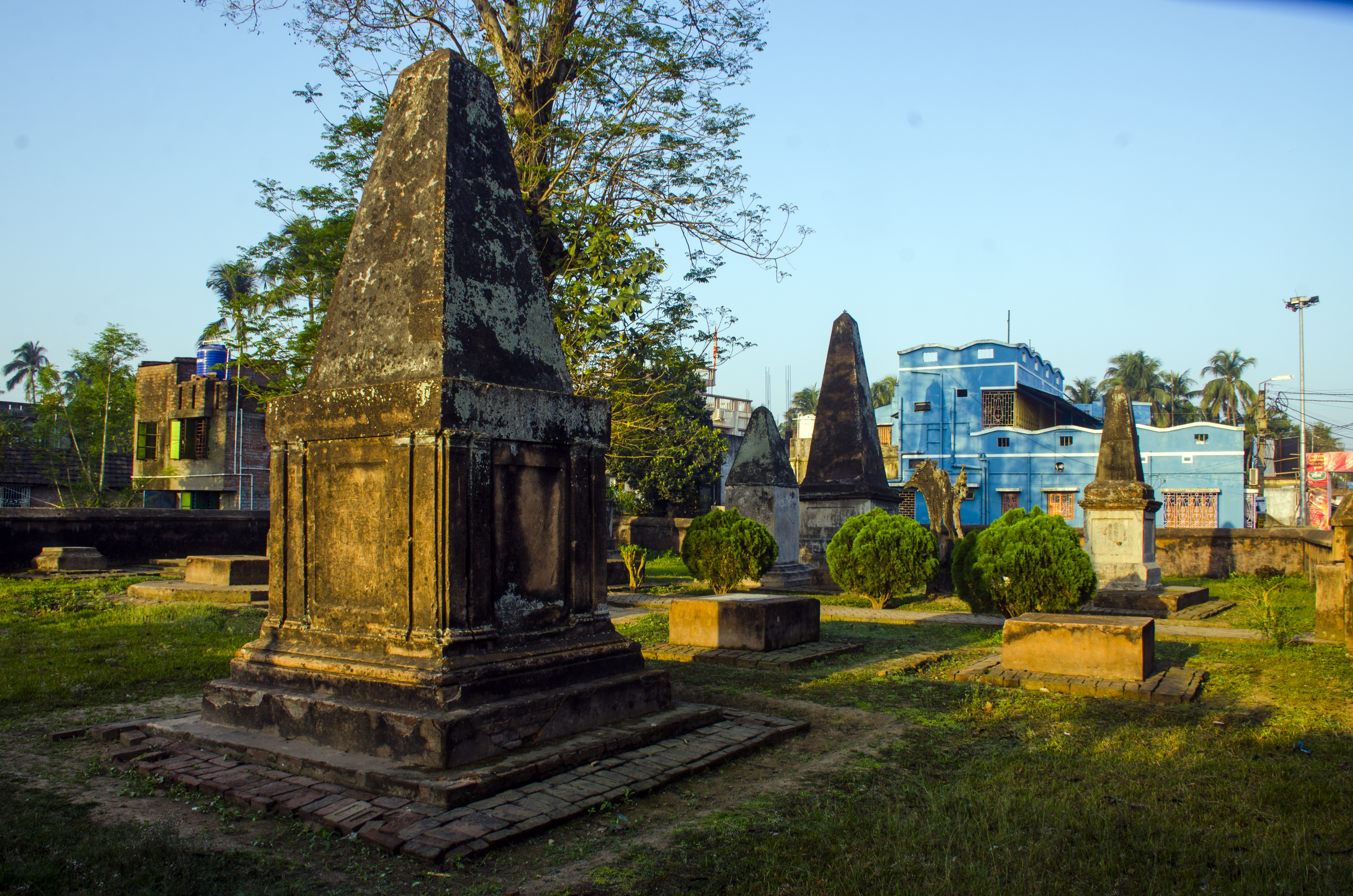
- British Cemetery of Cossimbazar
- Interactive map of British Cemetery, Cossimbazar

Details
- Location: Cossimbazar, Murshidabad district, West Bengal
- Country: India
- Coordinates: 24°07′25″N 88°16′33″E
- Type: Christian cemetery
- No. of graves: 17/18

British Cemetery, Cossimbazar is a colonial era Christian cemetery situated at Cossimbazar in Murshidabad district in the Indian state of West Bengal. It is also known as Old English Cemetery maintained by the Archaeological Survey of India (ASI).

== History ==
The cemetery was established during the period of the British East India Company's presence in Cossimbazar. This area was a commercial settlement of Bengal for European businessman including the English, Dutch, French and Armenians. It was used as burial ground for personnel of East India Company and their family members.

== Notable graves ==
- Mary Hastings, first wife of Warren Hastings
- Elizabeth Hastings, infant daughter of Warren Hastings
- Lyon Prager, Diamond merchant

== See more ==
- St. Mary Armenian Church, Saidabad
- Dutch Cemetery, Murshidabad
- Residency Cemetery, Babulbona

== Gallery ==
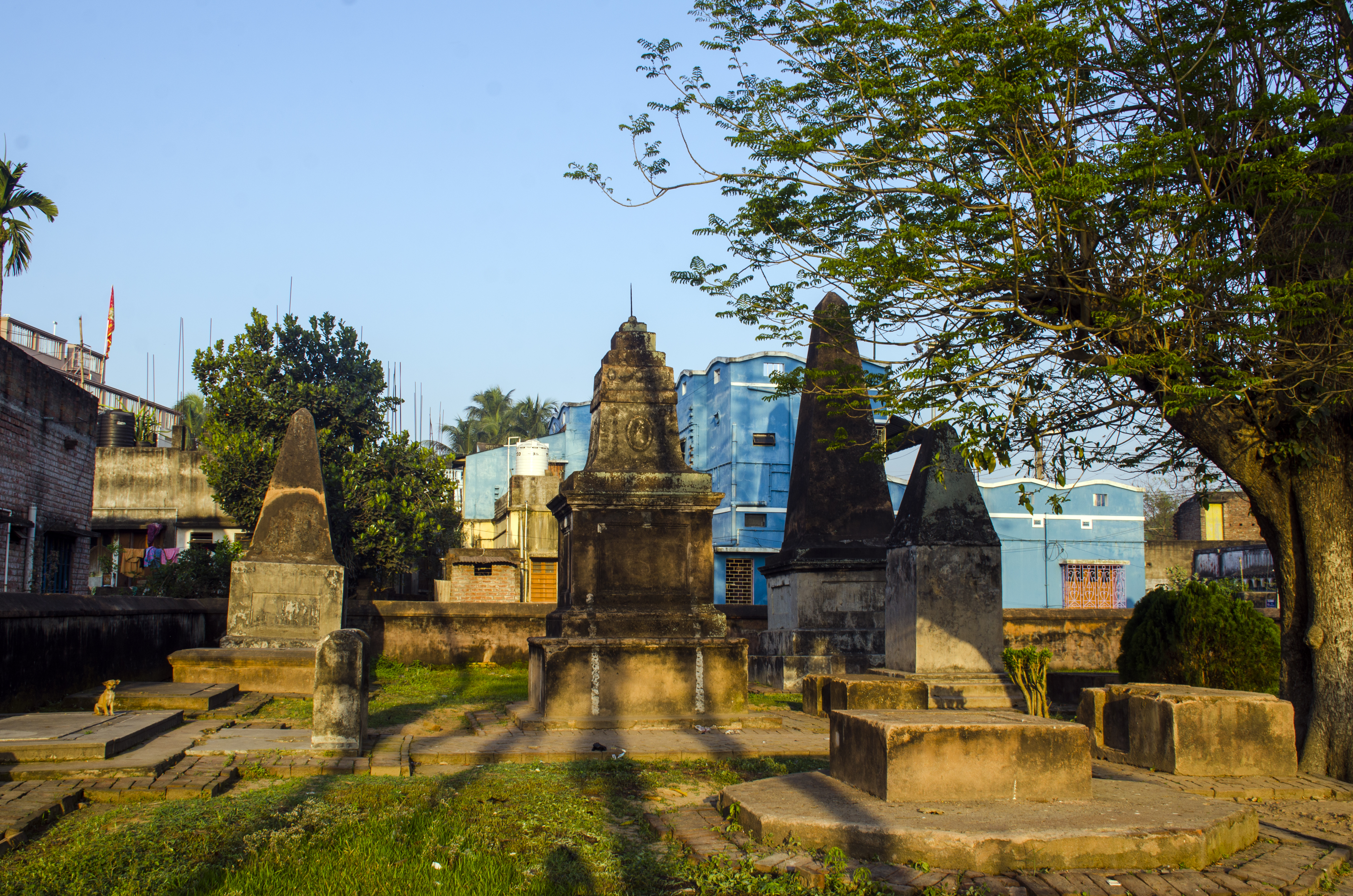

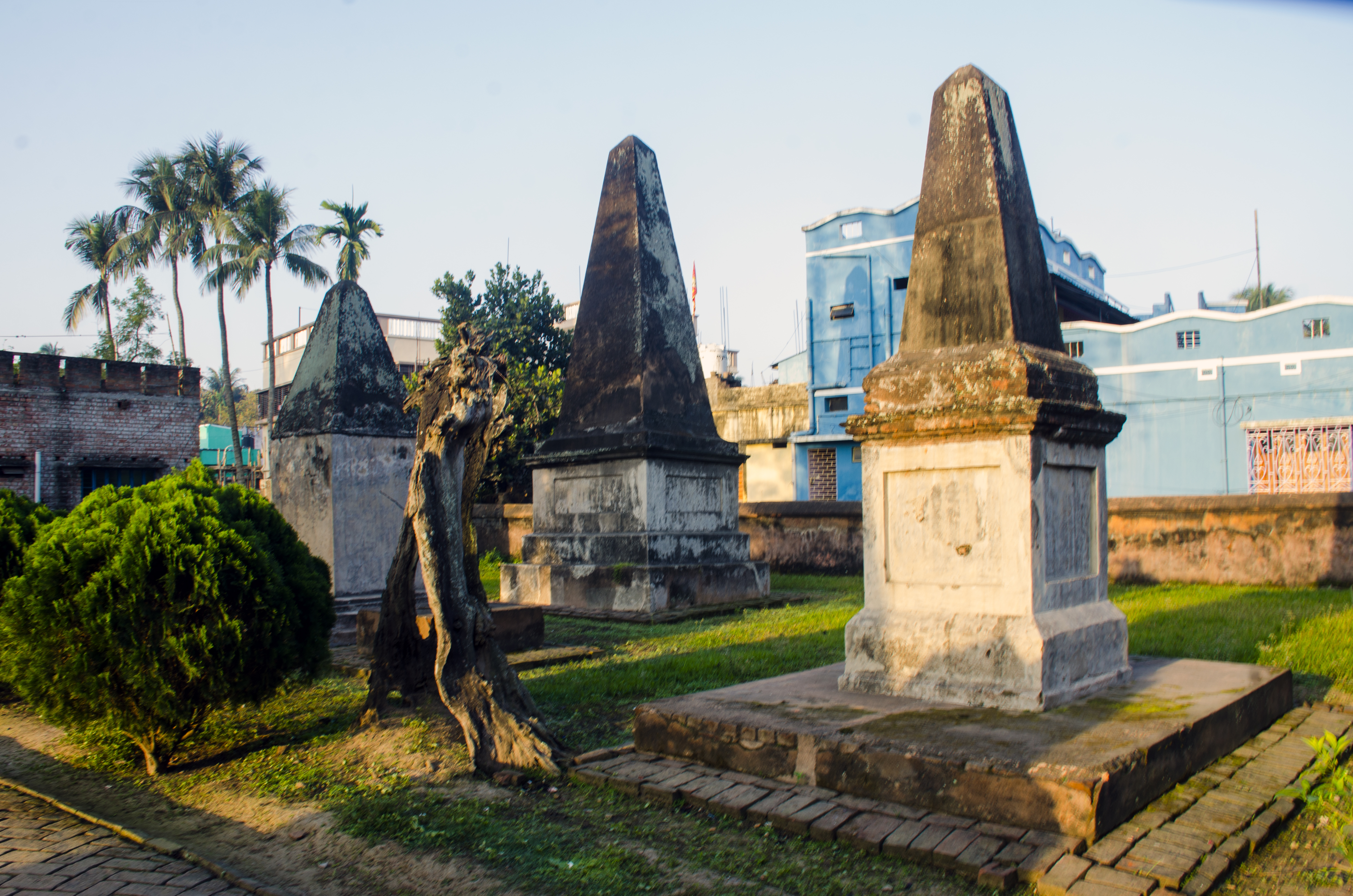

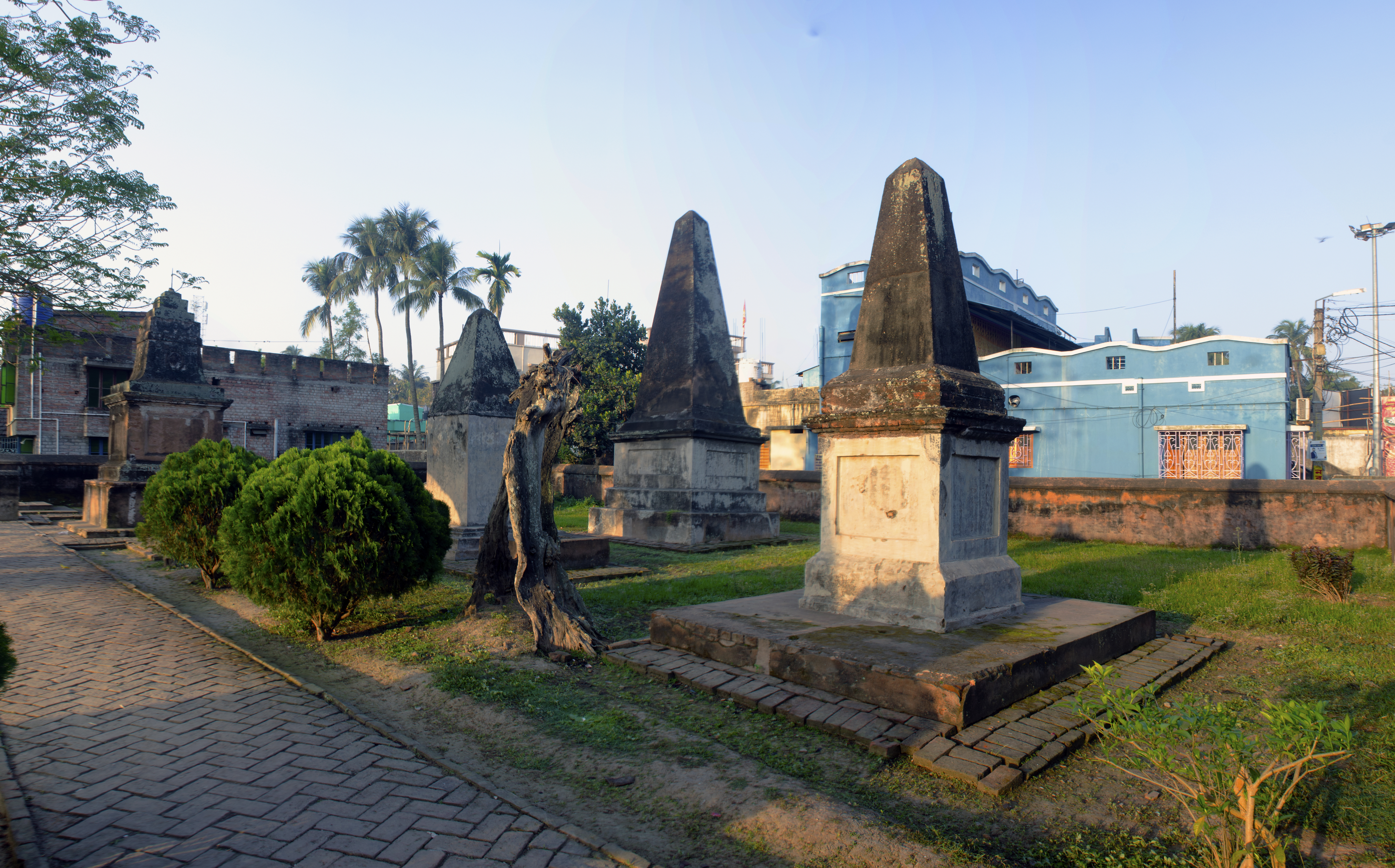
