= Srish Chandra Nandy =

Bengali politician and writer and zamindar of Cossimbazar Raj (1897-1952)

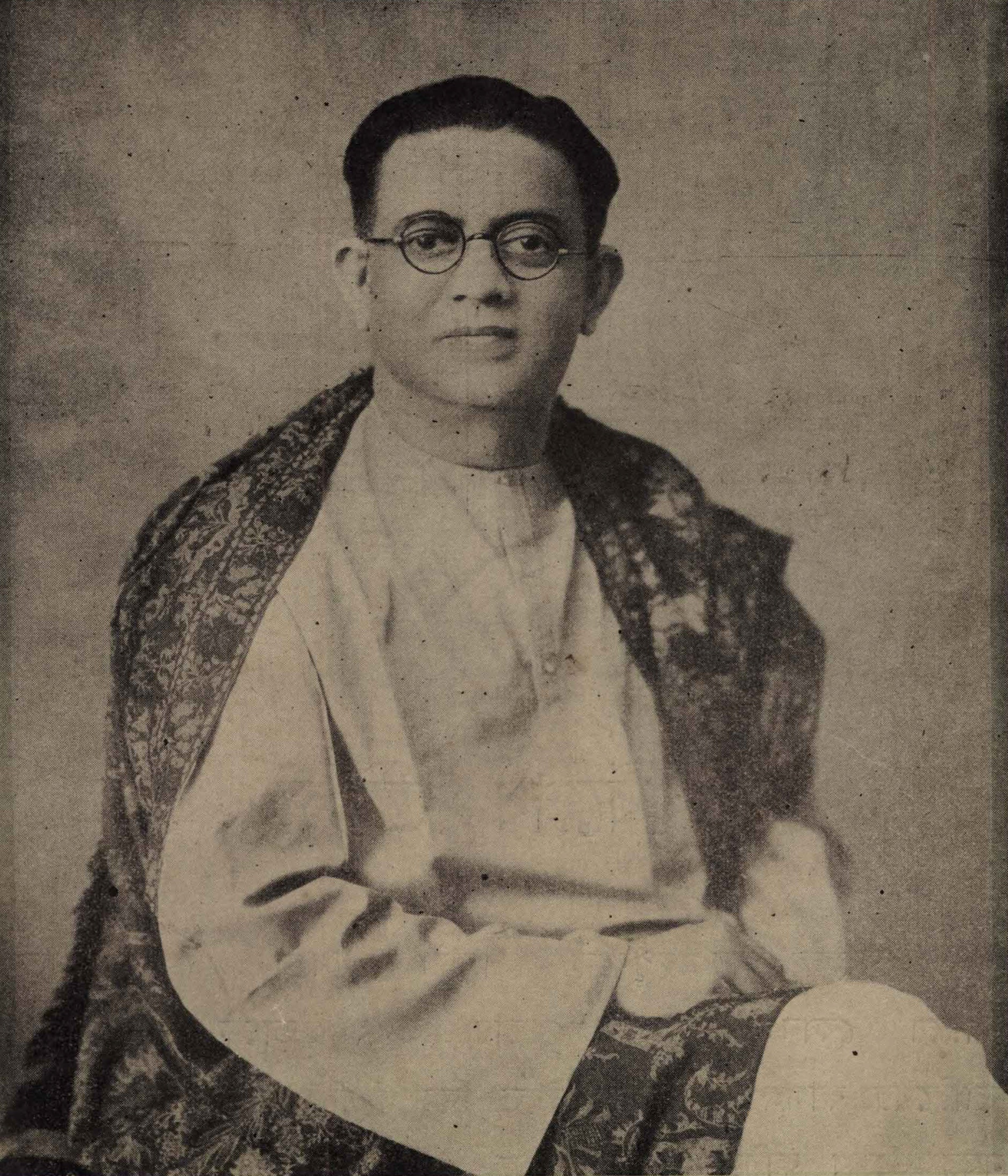
- Born: Srish Chandra Nandy; 10 October 1897; Calcutta, British India
- Died: 23 February 1952 (aged 54)
- Education: Calcutta University
- Spouse: Nilimaprova Devi (m. 1917)
- Children: Animaprova Devi (b.1920), Somendra Chandra Nandy (b.1928)
- Parents: Maharaja Manindra Chandra Nandy (father); Maharani Kashishwari (mother)

Srish Chandra Nandy (10 October 1897 – 23 February 1952) was the last zamindar of Cossimbazar Raj and a writer, politician and landlord.

== life ==
He was youngest son of Sir Maharaja Manindra Chandra Nandy and Maharani Kashishwari. His 2 elder brothers, Mahim Chandra and Kirti Chandra, died at a young age. He had four sisters.

He was elected as an independent candidate in the 1936 Bengal elections and then served as a minister in Government of Bengal in charge of Irrigation, Communications and Works for the years 1936–1941 in the Cabinet of Aq Fazlul Huq cabinet. In 1924, he became a member of Bengal Legislative Council. He was initially associated with Hindu Mahasabha but later joined Congress.

He was the author of books - Bengal Rivers and Our Economic Welfare, Flood and Its Remedy, Monopathy (a pathological study of mind) - a comic drama, Dasyu Duhita (Robber's daughter) - a five act drama.

The Maharaja Manindra Chandra College stands as a memorial, founded by him in memory of his father.

Later, he founded and funded another institution, which is now known as Maharaja Srish Chandra College.
