= Ulipur M.S. High School & College =

Coordinates: 25.6612°N 89.6195°E

- উলিপুর মহারাণী স্বর্ণময়ী উচ্চ বিদ্যালয় ও মহাবিদ্যালয়

Location
- Ulipur Upazila; Kurigram District; Bangladesh

Information
- School type: Secondary school, Vocational, College
- Established: 1868
- Founder: Maharani Sarnamoyi
- Principal: M.A. Kader
- Faculty: 50
- Grades: 6-12
- Gender: Boys & Girls
- Language: Bengali, English
- Website: ulipurmssc.edu.bd https://www.facebook.com/ms1868/

Ulipur M.S. High School & College (Bengali: উলিপুর মহারাণী স্বর্ণময়ী উচ্চ বিদ্যালয় ও মহাবিদ্যালয়), formerly known as Ulipur Maharani Swarnamayee High School & College, is an educational institution in Ulipur Upazila, Kurigram District, Bangladesh. It is a 150-year-old educational institution that offers secondary and higher secondary level education.

== History and tradition ==
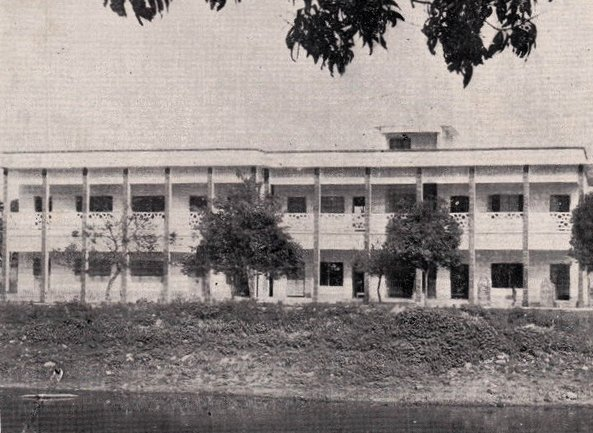
Old Academic Building

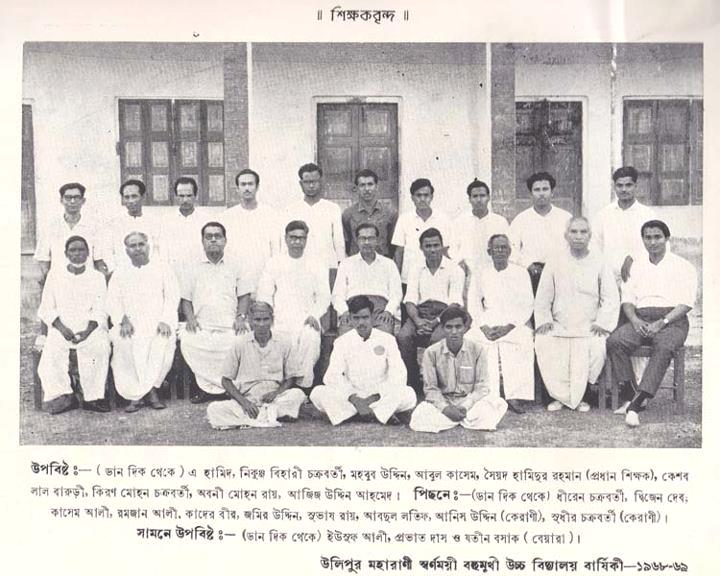
Faculties & Stuffs, 1968-69

Ulipur M.S. High School & College was founded by the eminent Zamindar, social activist & one of the pioneer feminist Maharani Swarnamoyee in 1868. She was the better half of Zamindar Krishnakanta Nandi of Cossimbazar Raj estate. Before her death, she donated her entire properties for the welfare & education of the local unprivileged people.

Initially the school was named as English High School which was later changed to Ulipur Maharani Sarnamoyi High School. Famous poet Kabishekhar Kalidas Roy was the first Head master of this school. During the British Raj in Bengal Presidency, it was the Pilgrimage for the student of North Bengal and Assam. It has also large contribution during the Bangladesh Liberation War in 1971. Legendary teacher Sayed Hamidur Rahman was the Headmaster in that period.

== Campus ==
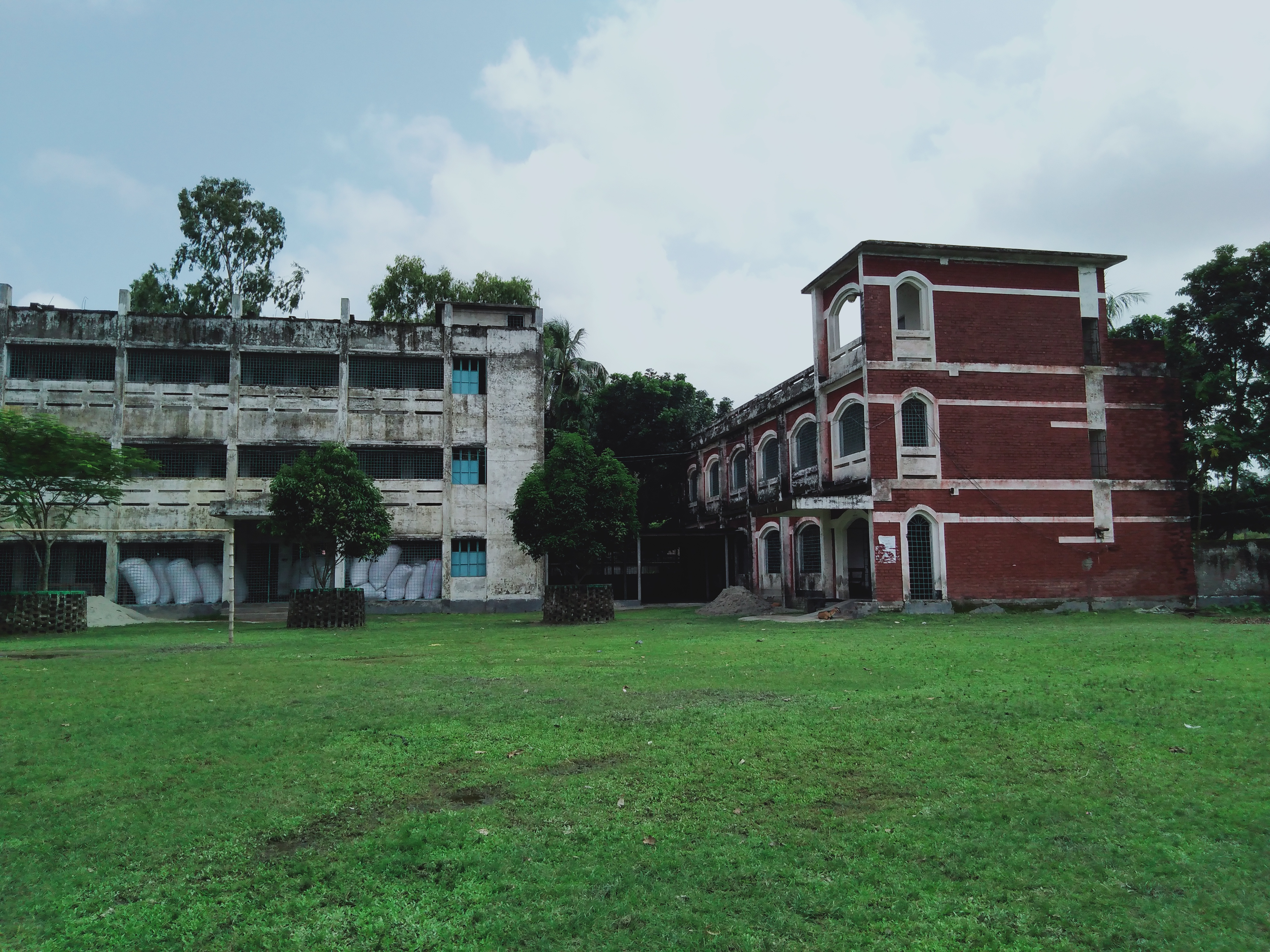
New Academic Building & Administrative Building

M.S. School & College is located on a 5-acre campus in the center of Ulipur Upazila town. The old two storied academic building is replaced by a new three storied building in 2008. Now there are one administrative building and 5 academic buildings in the campus, surrounded by several ponds, sports fields & tree gardens.

The campus has its own mosque, temple, canteen, parking garage, gymnasium, Labs etc. Vocational wings has a separate campus inside of it. There are a primary school, a fire defense center & shahee masque situated near the campus. Besides, there are some lands and properties in the city which belongs to the institution.

== Administration ==
M.S. School & College is a non government educational institution. There are three different wings school, college and vocational unit, managed by a common administration. This institution is run by the TERMS AND CONDITIONS OF SERVICE REGULATIONS, 1979, Bangladesh. Previously M.S. School & College used to offer only secondary education. Later in 1997 it started its vocational wing and in 1999 started its higher secondary education program. It is about to start degree education within next few years. At present, there are nearly 2500 students, 80 faculties & 20 stuffs in the institute.

== Admission ==
The institute admits students into the 6th, 9th and 11th grades. Consequently, the higher grades have fewer students than the lower grades, as a relatively large number of students transfer out. Admission in the 6th and 9th grades are based on PSC & JSC result. Admission to the 11th grade is determined by a student's grade point average (GPA) in the SSC examination through online admission process. Many students with the highest grades in the SSC compete for admission as the school has limited enrollment in every grade.

== Curriculum ==
Curriculum includes traditional secondary and intermediate level academic subjects. Students of the secondary level have to elect one of the three major programs: Arts and Humanities; Commerce; and Science. Students of the intermediate level (grades 11 and 12), have to elect one of the three major programs as well. Students have some compulsory subjects and some optional subjects in each of the programs.

== Extra-curricular activities ==
- Events and Cultural Programs
- Science Club & Computer Lab
- English Language Club
- Debate & Quiz
- Physical Exercise
- Sports
- Scouts

== Notable alumni ==
- Selim Al Deen
