= Kazir Mosque =

Mosque in Ulipur, Kurigram, Bangladesh

- প্রাচীন কাজির মসজিদ
- Location of the mosque in Bangladesh

Religion
- Affiliation: Islam
- Ecclesiastical or organizational status: Mosque
- Status: Active

Location
- Location: North Daldalia, Ulipur, Kurigram District, Rangpur Division
- Country: Bangladesh
- Interactive map of Kazir Mosque
- Coordinates: 25°41′46.2″N 89°33′49.9″E

Architecture
- Type: Mughal architecture
- Style: Islamic
- Founder: Kazi Qutbuddin
- Completed: 1214 AH (1799/1800 CE)

Specifications
- Direction of façade: West
- Length: 32 ft (9.8 m)
- Width: 13 ft (4.0 m)
- Dome: 3
- Site area: 3 acres
- Inscriptions: One
- Materials: Brick; Stone

The Kazir Mosque also known by its official name, Prachin Kazir Masjid (Bengali: প্রাচীন কাজির মসজিদ) is an ancient mosque located in North Daldalia, Ulipur Upazila in the Kurigram District of Bangladesh. The Bangladeshi Department of Archaeology designated the mosque as a protected monument. It is situated approximately 8 kilometres (4.97 miles) west of Ulipur Upazila headquarters in Daldalia Union.

== History ==
In 1214 Hijri, a Persian cleric named Kazi Qutbuddin arrived in the Ulipur region from present-day Iran to propagate Islam. He established the mosque and regularly led the five daily prayers with local worshippers. The mosque was later named Kazi's Mosque in his honor. After Kazi Qutbuddin left the area, local muslims continued to use the mosque for prayers. Over time, religious activities declined, and the structure became overgrown with vegetation. Eventually, the local community restored the mosque and resumed prayers.

In 2003, the Department of Archaeology of Bangladesh officially took over the site for preservation.

== Architecture ==
The main structure of the mosque was built using lime mortar, stone, and surki (brick dust). It measures 32 feet in length and 13 feet in width, with walls approximately 2.5 feet thick. The ancient building originally featured three domes and was constructed on a solid foundation.

Later, two more domes and four small minarets were added to the roof, bringing the total to five domes and four minarets. Inside, there is a small mihrab. The original structure can accommodate about 14–15 worshippers for prayer. While preserving the original structure, a two-storey extension has been built on the foundation of a planned four-storey building. In the extended area, up to 11 rows of worshippers can perform prayers simultaneously.

== Inscription ==
A Persian inscription at the main entrance identifies Kazi‌ Qutbuddin as the mosque's founder. The inscription reads:

In the name of Allah, the most gracious, the most merciful. There is no deity but Allah; Muhammad (Peace be upon him) is the Messenger of Allah. Kazi Qutbuddin Sahib, with firm faith in Iman, built this sacred house of Allah, the mosque. By the means of the Prophet (Peace be upon him), the construction was completed on a Monday.

== See also ==
- Islam in Bangladesh
- List of mosques in Bangladesh
- List of the oldest mosques
