= Cossimbazar railway station =

Railway station in West Bengal, India

COSSIMBAZAR
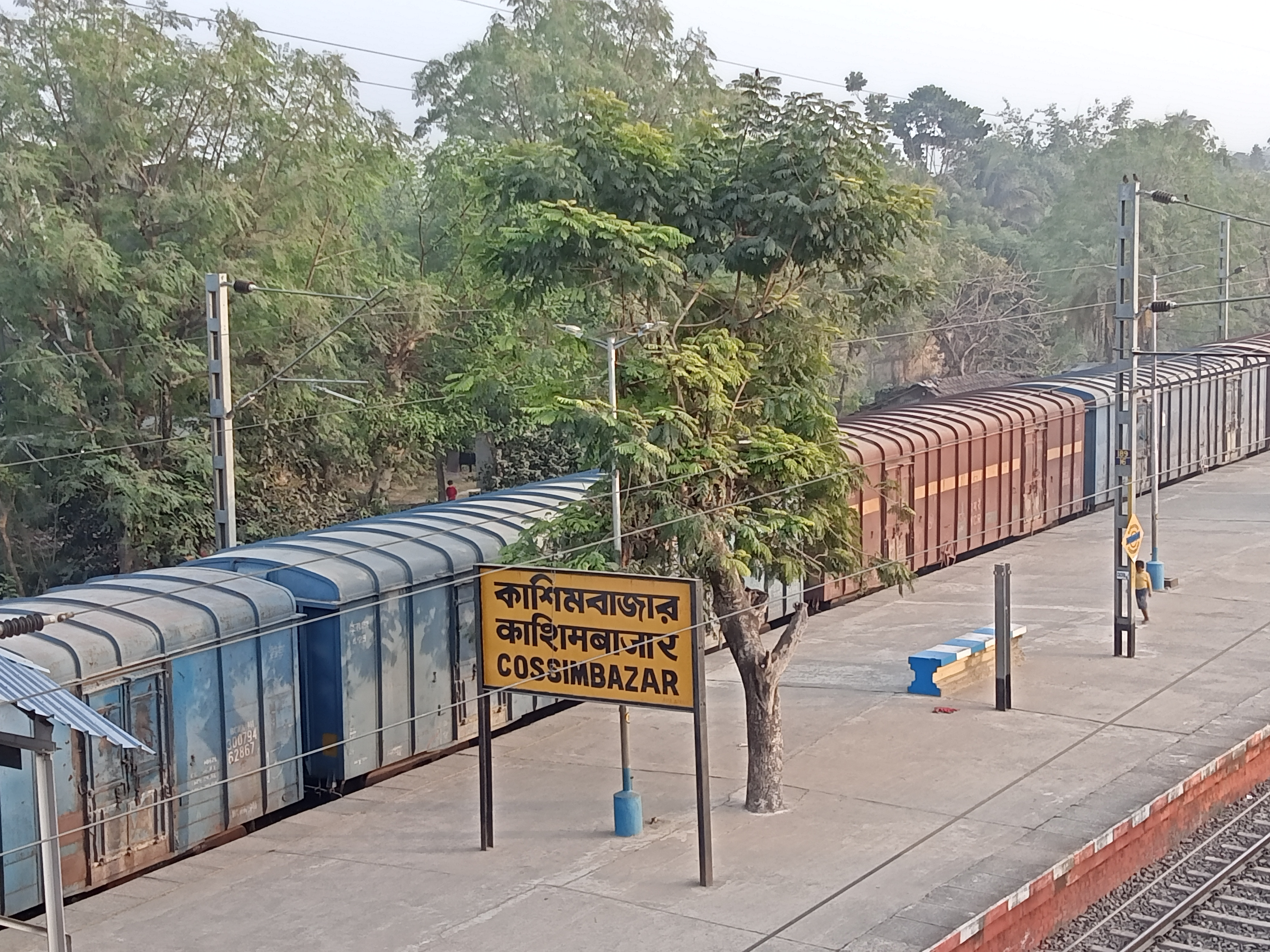

General information
- Location: Cossimbazar, Murshidabad district, West Bengal; India
- Coordinates: 24.121951°N 88.266970°E
- Elevation: 23 m (75 ft)
- System: Passenger train and Suburban train station
- Owner: Indian Railways
- Operator: Eastern Railway zone
- Line: Sealdah-Lalgola line
- Platforms: 3
- Tracks: 3

Construction
- Structure type: Standard (on ground station)
- Parking: No

Other information
- Status: Active
- Station code: CSZ
- Zone(s): Eastern Railway zone
- Division(s): Sealdah

History
- Former names: East Indian Railway Company

Services
Preceding station	Kolkata Suburban Railway	Following station
Berhampore Court towards Krishnanagar City Junction	Eastern Line Krishnanagar–Lalgola line	Murshidabad Junction towards Lalgola
Location
- Interactive map

Cossimbazar railway station is a railway station of the Sealdah-Lalgola line in the Eastern Railway zone of Indian Railways. The station is situated at Cossimbazar in northern part of Baharampur in Murshidabad district in the Indian state of West Bengal. It serves northern part of Baharampur. Distance between Sealdah and Cossimbazar is 189 km (118 mi).

== Electrification ==
The Krishnanagar–Lalgola section, including Cossimbazar railway station was electrified in 2004. In 2010 the line became double tracked.
