= Soumendra Prasad Pandey =

Bangladeshi politician

- সৌমেন্দ্র প্রসাদ পান্ডে

Member of the Bangladesh Parliament for Kurigram-3
- In office 10 January 2024 – 6 August 2024
- Preceded by: M. A. Matin
- Succeeded by: Md Mahbubul Alam

Personal details
- Born: 14 July 1955 (age 71)
- Party: Awami League

Soumendra Prasad Pandey (born 14 July 1955) is a Bangladeshi politician from the Awami League. He was a Jatiya Sangsad member representing the Kurigram-3 constituency in 2024.
