= Md Mahbubul Alam =

Bangladeshi politician

Members of Parliament
- Incumbent
- Assumed office 17 February 2026
- Preceded by: Soumendra Prasad Pandey
- Constituency: Kurigram-3

Personal details
- Party: Bangladesh Jamaat-e-Islami
- Occupation: Politician

Md Mahbubul Alam is a politician of Bangladesh Jamaat-e-Islami and an incumbent MP from the Kurigram-3 constituency.
