= Chayan Mukherjee =

Indian police officer

Chayan Mukherjee (born 1945) IPS retired as the ADG (Law & Order) in 2005. In his career he has held many important positions in West Bengal Police and Kolkata Police department. Probably the most challenging post for which he was handpicked and is still remembered largely is as the first Superintendent of Police for the district of North 24 Parganas in West Bengal.

== Early life ==
Chayan Mukherjee was born in a remote village of Khaliskhali, located in Khulna District of undivided India (today's Bangladesh). He is the third child of his parents Late Bishnupada Mukherjee and Late Snehakana Devi. He completed his matriculation and high school from KMSC institute near his village and came to Calcutta for higher studies. He completed his bachelor's degree in Commerce from the Maharaja Manindra Chandra College, an affiliate college of the University of Calcutta, and subsequently his post-graduation from the University of Calcutta. He served for a bank and Kolkata Municipal Corporation before joining the Indian Police Service in 1968.

== Career ==
Chayan Mukherjee served 36 years in Indian Police Service. He first joined as SDPO Bishnupur in 1968. He became the Addl. SP Burdwan in 1972. He also served as Commandant, EFR 2nd Battalion during 1980-1982 and in 1982 he was appointed as Superintendent of Police of Maldah. Mukherjee was appointed as Deputy Inspector General of Police Administration, West Bengal in 1996. He retired as Additional Director General of Police Law & Order in 2005. Since 1990 he has posted in Kolkata, operating from the Writer's Building, Lalbazar and Bhawani Bhawan. For his exceptional service, Chayan Mukherjee has been awarded the President's Police Medal for meritorious service in 1999, which was presented to him by Viren Shah, Governor of West Bengal and the President's Police Medal for distinguished service in 2005 presented by Gopal Krishna Gandhi, Governor of West Bengal. After retirement Mukherjee was associated with the Home department as a special officer till January 2007.

== Personal life ==
Chayan Mukherjee is an eminent writer by himself. His books Fire Dekha is an exceptional success. Since then he has published quite a few works, the latest being Moru Paharer Deshe - a travelogue on Ladakh. He has also written a few more books including Rahasya Upanyas and a collection of short stories.

Police appointments
Preceded by None	Superintendent of Police, N 24 Parganas; 1986 - 1990	Succeeded by Rajpal Singh
