= Renu Pada Das =

Indian politician

Renu Pada Das (born Sadhanpara, Nadia district, 1 December 1927) was member of 5th Lok Sabha from Krishnanagar (Lok Sabha constituency) in West Bengal, India. He was the leader of Communist Party of India (Marxist).

== Career ==
Das hails from Baharampur, Murshidabad. He passed from K. N. College, and Vidyasagar College, under the University of Calcutta. He worked as lecturer in Colleges as well as political and social worker in the district. Das initially joined in Communist Party of India and became the Secretary of People's Relief Committee of Murshidabad district.

He was elected to 6th, 7th and 8th Lok Sabha from Krishanagar constituency in Nadia district.
