= Benimadhab Barua =

Scholar of ancient Indian languages

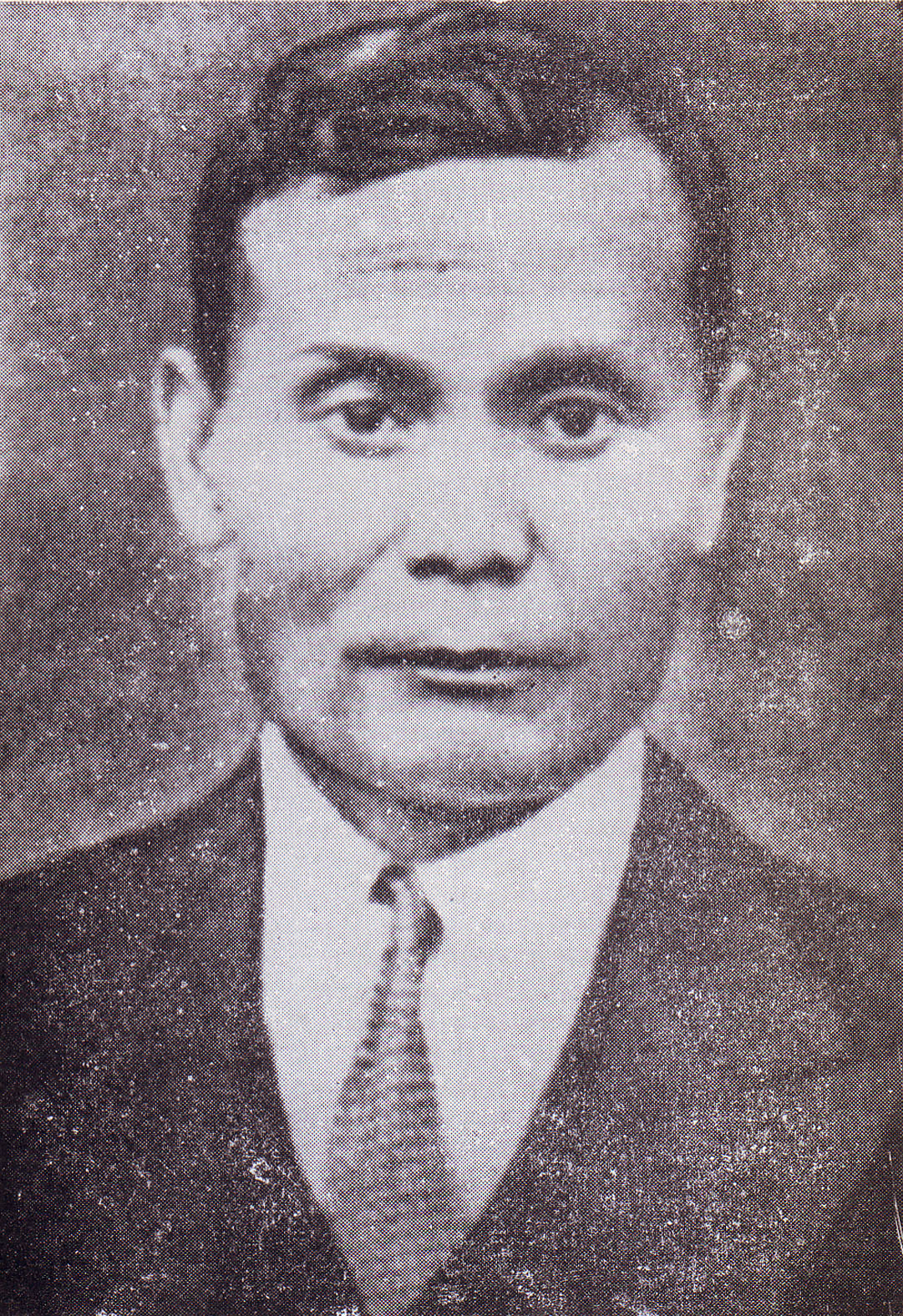
- Born: 31 December 1888; Chittagong, Bengal Province, British India (now in Bangladesh)
- Died: 23 March 1948 (aged 59); Calcutta, West Bengal, India
- Education: University of London; University of Calcutta

Benimadhab Barua (31 December 1888 – 23 March 1948) was an Indian scholar of ancient Indian languages, Buddhism and law. He was a prominent educationist and writer.

== Early life ==
Barua was born on 31 December 1888 in a Barua Magh family of Chittagong district of Bengal Province. Among the schools and college he attended were the Chittagong Collegiate School, Chittagong College, Scottish Church College and Presidency College, Krishnath College from where he passed BA (Hons) in Pāli in 1911. In 1913 he earned an MA degree in Pāli from University of Calcutta. Thereafter he also studied law at Calcutta City College and Calcutta Law College, affiliated with the same university.

== Career ==
Barua joined the Mahāmuni Anglo-Pāli Institution as headmaster in 1912. From 1913 to 1914 he worked as a lecturer in the Pāli department of the University of Calcutta. He went to England on a government scholarship in 1914. He earned an MA in Greek and Modern European Philosophy from the University of London. In 1917 he was awarded a D.Litt. by the University of London. He was the first Asian to do so.

After returning to India in 1918, Barua rejoined Calcutta University and was promoted to a professorship. He developed the syllabus of the MA course in Pali along with his work in the departments of Ancient Indian History and Culture (1919–48) and Sanskrit (1927–48) in the same university.

Barua's 1921 work on The Ajivikas served as the background for "History and Doctrines of the Ajivikas" (1950) the PhD dissertation of A. L. Basham, who cites Barua's work frequently.

== Works ==
Barua was a prolific scholar. Some of his works include:

=== In English ===
- A History of Pre-Buddhist Indian Philosophy
- A Prolegomena to the History of Buddhist Philosophy (1918)
- A History of Pre-Buddhistic Indian Philosophy (1921)
- The Ajivikas (1921)
- Prakrit Dharmapad (which he wrote jointly with Shailendranath Mitra)
- Old Brāhmi Inscriptions in the Udayagiri and Khandgiri (1926)
- Barhut Inscriptions (which he wrote jointly with Gangananda Singh)
- Gaya and Buddha Gaya (1st part 1931, 2nd part 1934)
- Asoka and His Inscriptions (1946)
- Brahmachari Kuladananda and His Guru Bijaya Krishna Goswami (1938)
- Ceylon Lecture (1945)
- Studies in Buddhism (1947)
- Philosophy of Progress (1948)

=== In Bengali ===
- The Bangla translation along with the original Pāli text of his first book, Lokaniti, which was published in the annual report (1912) of the Bauddha Dharmankur Sabha.
- Madhyam Nikay (1st part, 1940)
- Bauddha Granthakos (1st part, 1936)
- Bauddhaparinay

Barua also wrote over a hundred essays and speeches which were published in different journals.

== Later life ==
Barua was a Fellow of the Royal Asiatic Society of Bengal, member of Bangiya Sahitya Parishad, the Mahābodhi Society of India, Calcutta and of the executive committee of Iran Society. He edited Indian Culture, Buddhist India, Jagajjyoti and Vishvavani. In recognition of his contribution to Buddhist studies, he was awarded the title of ‘Tripitakāchārya’ in 1944. The Asiatic Society awarded him the Bimalacharan Laha Gold Medal. He died on 23 March 1948 in Calcutta.
