= Nagendra Kumar Bhattacharyya =

Indian politician

Rai Sahib Nagendra Kumar Bhattacharyya
- Born: Nagendra Kumar Bhattacharyya; 5 November 1888; Tripura, British India
- Died: 8 April 1967 (aged 78); Kolkata, West Bengal, India
- Education: Nawab's H. E. School, Murshidabad; Krishnath College Berhampore; University of Calcutta
- Spouse(s): Snehalata Devi, daughter of Rai Bahadur Kedarnath Choudhury of Bamui Zamindar House of Mymensingh
- Children: 7

Rai Sahib Nagendra Kumar Bhattacharyya (5 November 1888 – 8 April 1967) was an Indian criminal lawyer practising in the High Court of Calcutta and a Member of the West Bengal Legislative Council.

== Early life ==
Bhattacharyya was born into an orthodox Brahmin family in Tripura. He was educated at Nawab's H. E. School, Murshidabad and later at Krishnath College, Berhampore. He received a government scholarship and graduated from the University of Calcutta in law in 1913 in the first division. He received a jagir from the Nawab of Murshidabad and was zamindar of eminence in Murshidabad. He was married to Snehalata Devi of Mymensingh, daughter of Rai Bahadur Kedar Nath Chowdhury of the Zamindar House of Bamui and who was also the first Bengali District & Sessions Judge of Undivided Bengal. Bhattacharyya officiated as the Government Pleader for Murshidabad in 1932 and was retained Advocate of the Court of Murshidabad. In 1934, he was given the title of Rai Sahib. He was Commissioner of the Berhampore Municipality from 1932 to 1948 and Member of the West Bengal Legislative Council from June 1956 to June 1964. He is mentioned in the book 'Bansha-Parichay' that documents eminent noble and aristocratic family lineages of undivided Bengal in British India. He was invited to attend the coronation durbar of King George V, Emperor of India.

== Career ==
He joined the Murshidabad District Bar as a pleader in 1913. He enrolled as an Advocate at Berhampore in 1931. He started practicing in civil and criminal law in Berhampore and was enrolled as an Advocate of the Calcutta High Court in 1931. In 1932 he officiated as the Government Pleader of Murshidabad.

Bhattacharyya was retained Advocate of the Court of Murshidabad. In 1934 he was given the title Rai Sahib. He was Commissioner of the Berhampore Municipality from 1932 to 1948. He was member of the West Bengal Legislative Council from June 1956 to June 1964.

On 12 March 1967, the Berhampore Bar Association celebrated the Golden Jubilee of his practice.

Bhattacharyya was a jagirdar in the State of Murshidabad. He is mentioned in the book 'Bansha-Parichay' that documents the lineage of eminent families lineages of undivided Bengal in British India. He was one of the select noblemen invited to attend the Delhi Durbar of King George V, Emperor of India.

== Other positions ==
- Director, West Bengal Provincial Co-operative Bank
- Director, City Murshidabad Co-operative Society
- Vice Chairman, West Bengal Central Co-operative Land Mortgage Bank
- Member, Law Sub Committee, All India Co-operative Union
- Member, Working Group on Industrial Co-operatives appointed by Ministry of Commerce and Industry, Govt. of India
- Member, Executive Committee National Co-operative Land Mortgage Bank
- Vice Chairman, Berhampore Central Co-operative Bank
- Vice Chairman, Murshidabad District Co-operative Land Mortgage Bank
- Vice Chairman, Berhampore Co-operative Ganja Farming Society
- Vice President, Murshidabad Institute of Technology
- President, Berhampore Ramkrishna Mission

== Publications ==
- The cattle trespass act, 1871 (I of 1871) as modified up to 1958
- The code of criminal procedure (Act V of 1898) as amended up to date, with the Criminal law amendment act
- The Medico-Legal Court Companion
- The law of motor vehicles in India

== Personal ==
Bhattacharyya was father to four sons and three daughters. He died on 8 April 1967 at Calcutta, aged 78.
