= Manindra Chandra Nandy =

Maharaja of Cossimbazar Raj (1860–1929)

- Born: Manindra Chandra Nandy; 29 May 1860; Shyambazar, Bengal Presidency, British India (now in North Kolkata, West Bengal, India)
- Died: 12 November 1929 (aged 69); Bengal Presidency, British India
- Title: Maharaja, Sir
- Predecessor: Maharani Swarnamoyee
- Successor: Srish Chandra Nandy
- Spouse: Maharani Kashishwari (m.1877)
- Children: Mahim Chandra Nandy, Srish Chandra Nandy, Kirti Chandra Nandy, Sarojini Devi, Kumudini Devi, Kamalini Devi, Mrinalini Devi

Maharaja Sir Manindra Chandra Nandy KCIE (29 May 1860 – 12 November 1929) was the Maharaja of Cossimbazar Raj from 1898 to 1929, a philanthropist and reformist during the period of Bengal Renaissance.

== Family ==
Manindra Chandra Nandy was born on 29 May 1860 at Shyambazar in North Kolkata in present-day West Bengal, India. His ancestral house was at Shyambazar, North Kolkata. From his mother's side he belonged to the royal family of Cossimbazar. His mother, Gobinda Sundari (sister of Raja Krishnath Roy) died when he was two, and his father died when he was twelve, in 1872. He had 8 elder siblings - Sarbeshwari (b.1843), Bishweshwari (b.1845), Upendra Chandra (b.1848 - d.1872), Bhubaneshwari, Jogendra Chandra (b.1854 - d.1868), Siddheshwari, Ramaneshwari (b.1857), and another boy. By 1875, Manindra's family consisted of his 3 widowed sisters and he was the guardian.

He became the Maharaja of Cossimbazar, as per the wishes of Cossimbazar Raj Family, as there were no direct male descendants alive after the death of Maharani Swarnamoyee in 1897.

== Education ==
Manindra Chandra suffered from a severe illness when he was fourteen, which prevented him from going to school. Though he later recovered from the illness, he studied at home and did not obtain formal education.

== Marriage and Children ==
He married Maharani Kashishwari (b.1868) of Jabagram, Burdwan in 1877. He had 3 sons - Mahim Chandra (b.1881 - d.1906), Kirti Chandra (b.1885 - d.1903), and Srish Chandra Nandy (b.1897). His daughters were Sarojini Devi (b.1889), Kumudini Devi (b.1893), Kamalini Devi (b.1900) and Mrinalini Devi (b.1906). He was greatly saddened by the early deaths of his two eldest sons due to typhoid. His two elder daughters got widowed at a young age.

== Contribution for the promotion of education ==
Maharaja Manindra Chandra Nandy

=== Krishnath College ===
In 1902, Berhampore College was renamed Krishnath College to preserve the memory of Raja Krishnath Roy, the maternal uncle of Manindra Chandra and husband of Maharani Swarnamoyee. In 1905, control of Krishnath College was handed over to Manindra Chandra Nandy by the government via a deed of transfer. A board of management was created, with Nandy as its president. Nandy spent Rs. 45,000 annually for the maintenance of the college.

=== Krishnath College School ===
A large building for Krishnath College School was constructed and expanded at the expense of Rs. 135,000 by Maharaja Manindra Chandra Nandy at Berhampore College to accommodate 1,200 students annually. The foundation stone was laid in 1909 and the school formally opened in 1911.

=== Different schools ===
Manindra Chandra established an English medium high school with a hostel at his ancestral village of Mathrun, Burdwan, at a cost of Rs. 50,000. He maintained schools in other villages and patronised schools for the handicapped in Calcutta.

=== Different colleges ===
Nandy contributed Rs. 15,000 for the construction of The Calcutta Medical School and College of Physicians and Surgeons of Bengal in 1904. He donated Rs. 5,000 for Daulatpur College and Rs. 50,000 for Rangpur College. In 1914, he contributed Rs. 5,000 to Medical College and Hospital for Women and the Nurses Training Institute in New Delhi. He created a chair at Banaras Hindu University and a science chair at Sir Jagadish Chandra Bose Laboratory. He patronised the Bengal Technical Institute, National College, and The Association for the Scientific and Industrial Education of Indians.

== Publications ==
He wrote the books The Indian Medicinal Plant, A History of Indian Philosophy,

== Offices held ==
Manindra Chandra was president of the British Indian Association in 1922, 1923, and 1929 and a member of Imperial Legislative Council from 1913 to 1921. Nandy was the chairman of Berhampore Municipality and Murshidabad District Board. He was one of the founder members and later president of the Bengal National Chamber of Commerce & Industry. He was an active leader and member of Hindu Mahasabha

== Awards and honours ==
Manindra Chandra received the title of Maharaja on 30 May 1898. He received his knighthood in 1915 along with being appointed as Knight Commander of the Order of the Indian Empire. Nandy was also an honorary fellow of Calcutta University.

== Death ==
The Maharaja died on 12 November 1929.

== Memorials ==
The Maharaja Manindra Chandra College stands as his memorial, founded by his son, Maharaja Sris Chandra Nandy.
