= AKM Maidul Islam =

Bangladeshi politician

- এ কে এম মাঈদুল ইসলাম

Member of the Bangladesh Parliament for Kurigram-3
- In office 25 January 2009 – 11 May 2018
- Preceded by: Md. Motiur Rahman
- Succeeded by: Akkas Ali
- In office 10 July 1986 – 6 December 1990
- Preceded by: Position established
- Succeeded by: Md. Amjad Hossain Talukdar

Member of the Bangladesh Parliament for Rangpur-16
- In office 2 April 1979 – 24 March 1982
- Preceded by: Mohammad Sadakat Hossain
- Succeeded by: redistricted

Personal details
- Born: 1940 or 1943 Assam, British India
- Died: 11 May 2018 Dhaka, Bangladesh
- Resting place: Banani graveyard, Dhaka, Bangladesh
- Party: Jatiya Party
- Other political affiliations: Bangladesh Nationalist Party, National Awami Party (Bhashani)
- Spouse: Selina Begum
- Children: 3
- Parent: Mohammad Abul Quasem (father)
- Nickname: Mukul

AKM Maidul Islam (born 1940 or 1943; died 2018) was a Bangladeshi politician from Ulipur who served six terms in the Bangladesh Parliament between 1979 and 2018. First elected as a Bangladesh Nationalist Party (BNP) member, he later defected to the Jatiya Party (JP), briefly returned to the BNP, and finally rejoined the JP. Islam held ministerial positions under presidents Ziaur Rahman, Abdus Sattar, and Hussain Muhammad Ershad at various times between 1979 and 1990.

== Early life and education ==
AKM Maidul Islam was born in Assam, British India. Sources vary as to whether he was born on 29 May 1940 or 1 May 1943. His father was Mohammad Abul Quasem. After the partition of India, the family settled in Ulipur, East Pakistan, where his father would become a member of the 3rd National Assembly of Pakistan.

Islam attended Ulipur Maharani Swarnamoyi School and College and matriculated from Matlab High School in Comilla in 1959. He completed his Intermediate of Arts from Rajshahi Government College in 1961, and earned a master's degree in political science from the University of Karachi in 1966.

== Career ==
Islam first sought election to parliament, unsuccessfully, in 1973 as a National Awami Party (Bhashani) candidate.

He was elected to parliament from Rangpur-16 in 1979 as a Bangladesh Nationalist Party (BNP) candidate. He was appointed Minister of Posts, Telegraph, and Telephones in the Zia government in April 1979. In the Sattar government, he was retained in that position until February 1982. He was Minister of Civil Aviation and Tourism from January 1982 to March 1982.

On 6 April 1985, he and three other BNP ministers defected to the Jaitya Party of President Hussain Muhammad Ershad. He was elected to parliament from Kurigram-3 in 1986 and 1988 as a candidate of the Jatiya Party (Ershad). In the Ershad government, he was Minister of Land Administration and Land Reforms from November 1985 to April 1986; Minister of Ports, Shipping, and Water Transport from July 1986 to March 1987; the minister of land again from March 1987 to September 1987; the minister of shipping again from September 1987 to November 1987; Minister of Jute and Textiles from September 1988 to September 1989; and Minister of Forests and Environment from September 1988 to January 1990.

After the 1990 Bangladesh mass uprising led to the fall of Ershad, Islam unsuccessfully stood for re-election in 1991 as an independent. He then rejoined the BNP and was elected to parliament from Kurigram-3 in February 1996. Unable to hold his seat in June 1996, he returned to the Jatiya Party (Ershad) and was elected to parliament twice more, in 2008 and 2014.

== Death ==
Selina Begum, his wife, predeceased him on 14 February 2016. They had two daughters and a son. Islam died on 11 May 2018 in United Hospital Limited, Dhaka, Bangladesh. He is buried at Banani graveyard in Dhaka.
