= M. A. Matin (Kurigram politician) =

Bangladeshi politician

- এম. এ. মতিন

Member of the Bangladesh Parliament for Kurigram-3
- In office 30 January 2019 – 10 January 2024
- Preceded by: Akkas Ali
- Succeeded by: Soumendra Prasad Pandey

Personal details
- Born: 7 April 1956 (age 70)
- Party: Bangladesh Awami League
- Education: M.A, L.L.B
- Occupation: Politician; businessman

M. A. Matin (Bengali: এম এ মতিন) is a Bangladeshi politician and former Jatiya Sangsad member representing the Kurigram-3 constituency.

== Career ==
Matin was elected to parliament from Kurigram-3 as a Bangladesh Awami League candidate on 30 December 2018.
