= Md. Amjad Hossain Talukdar =

Bangladeshi politician

Member of Parliament for Kurigram-3
- In office 5 March 1991 – 24 November 1995
- Preceded by: AKM Maidul Islam
- Succeeded by: Mozammel Hossain Lalu

Personal details
- Party: Bangladesh Awami League

Md. Amjad Hossain Talukdar is a Bangladesh Awami League politician and a former Jatiya Sangsad member from the Kurigram-3 constituency.

== Career ==
Talukdar was elected to parliament from Kurigram-3 as a Bangladesh Awami League candidate in 1991.
