= Maharani Swarnamoyee =

Indian philanthropist

- Born: Saradasundari Devi; December 1827; Bhatakul, Bengal Presidency, British Raj (present day Purba Bardhaman district, India)
- Died: 25 August 1897 (aged 69); Cossimbazar
- Occupation: Philanthropist
- Title: Maharani Swarnamoyee
- Successor: Maharaja Manindra Chandra Nandy
- Spouse: Maharaja Krishna Nath of Cossimbazar Raj (m. 1836–1844)
- Children: Lakshmi Devi, Saraswati Devi

Maharani Swarnamoyee CI (December 1827 – August 25, 1897) was the Maharani of Cossimbazar Raj from 1844 to 1897. She was a philanthropist during the period of Bengal Renaissance.

== Marriage ==
Born in a poor family, Swarnamoyee was extremely beautiful and married Maharaja Krishna Nath Nandy of the Cossimbazar Royal Family in 1836. Her birth name was Saradasundari, which was changed to Swarnamoyee after marriage. They had two daughters, Lakshmi and Saraswati. Her husband committed suicide in 1844 at the age of 22. Among her daughters, one died in infancy, the other married and died at a young age. After her husband's death, she became Maharani of Cossimbazar Raj estate. Krishnath was Maharaja of Cossimbazar Raj from 1832 to 1844.

== Charity ==
To supply pure water for the residents of the town of Berhampore, the Swarnamoyee Water-works were constructed at a cost of Rs. 270,000, of which Rs. 162,000 was donated by Maharani Swarnamoyee. The project was inaugurated by Sir John Woodburn, then Lieutenant-Governor of Bengal, on 31 July 31, 1899. Swarnamoyee donated Rs. 1,000 to Calcutta Chandni Hospital in 1871, and Rs. 8,000 to Native Hospital in 1872. She also donated to famine and malaria relief funds.

Swarnamoyee donated Rs. 150,000 for the construction of a hostel to provide accommodation for female medical students at Calcutta Medical College. The foundation stone of the hostel was laid by Lady Dufferin. The hostel still bears the name of Maharani Swarnamoyee. Swarnamoyee donated 30 bighas of land for the construction of Berhampore College in 1851. In 1886, Maharani Swarnamoyee was vested with the necessary powers for the management of the college when the government withdrew from its management.

Swarnamoyee donated Rs. 1,000 to Medinipur High School in 1871, Rs. 4,000 to Rangpur High School, Rs. 3,000 to the Oriental Seminary and Rs. 10,000 to the Hindu Girls' School in 1876 and Rs. 5,000 to Khagra London Missionary School, Murshidabad in 1883. Swarnamoyee donated Rs. 15,000 to Bethune College in 1872, Rs. 2,000 to Cuttack College in 1875, Rs. 2,000 to Aligarh College in 1876 and Rs. 5,000 to London Imperial Jubilee Institution in 1887. She donated all of the land for Shibpur Bengal Engineering College. She donated Rs. 4,000 to the Hindu Hostel in 1879.

== Awards and recognition ==
Swarnamoyee received the title of Maharani on August 11, 1871. The Maharani received the Order of the Crown of India on August 14, 1878, in recognition of her charitable work.

== Death ==
Maharani Swarnamoyee died on August 25, 1897, at the age of 68. After her death, Maharaja Manindra Chandra Nandy, the son of Maharaja Krishna Nath's sister, Gobinda Sundari Devi, became the Maharaja of the Cossimbazar Raj estate.
