= Md. Motiur Rahman =

Bangladeshi politician

Member of Parliament for Kurigram-3
- In office 28 October 2001 – 27 October 2006
- Preceded by: Mozammel Hossain Lalu
- Succeeded by: AKM Maidul Islam

Personal details
- Party: Jatiya Party (Ershad)

Md. Motiur Rahman is a Jatiya Party (Ershad) politician and a former Jatiya Sangsad Member representing the Kurigram-3 constituency during 2001–2006.
