= Akkas Ali =

Bangladeshi politician

- আককাছ আলী

Member of Parliament for Kurigram-3
- In office 26 July 2018 – 29 January 2019
- Preceded by: AKM Maidul Islam
- Succeeded by: MA Matin

Personal details
- Born: 25 July 1967
- Education: Mymensingh Medical College

Md. Akkas Ali Sarker (known as Dr. Akkas Ali) is a Bangladeshi politician and a former Jatiya Sangsad member representing the Kurigram-3 constituency winning the by-election held in July 2018 after the death of AKM Maidul Islam.
