= Murshidabad Maharaja Krishnanath University =

Public university in West Bengal, India

- Former names: Murshidabad University (2021–2026); Krishnanath College (1873–2021)
- Motto: সা বিদ্যা যা বিমুক্তয়ে (Bengali)
- Motto in English: Learning Leads To Emancipation
- Type: Public
- Established: 1853; 173 years ago (as Krishnanath College); 2021; 5 years ago (as University)
- Affiliations: UGC; AIU
- Chancellor: Governor of West Bengal
- Vice-Chancellor: Jane Alam
- Location: Berhampore, West Bengal, India; 23°45′12″N 87°05′04″E
- Website: msduniv.ac.in

Murshidabad Maharaja Krishnanath University is a public state university in Berhampore, Murshidabad, West Bengal. The university was established in 2021 by the West Bengal government under The Murshidabad University Act, 2018. The city of Murshidabad is named after a great thinker, and the first Nawab of Bengal Murshid Quli Khan.

== History ==
Krishnath College logo

The institution was established in 1853 as Krishnath College as a liberal arts and sciences college in Baharampur. In 1998, Krishnath College became an affiliate of the University of Kalyani. Prior to this, they were an affiliate to University of Calcutta. In July 2018, the Murshidabad University Bill, which was passed by the house will enable a state-aided university in Murshidabad to be established by upgrading the existing Krishnath College. In February 2021, the principal of this college is appointed as vice-chancellor of Murshidabad University by Department of Higher Education, Govt. of West Bengal. In February 2026, the university was renamed as Murshidabad Maharaja Krishnanath University.

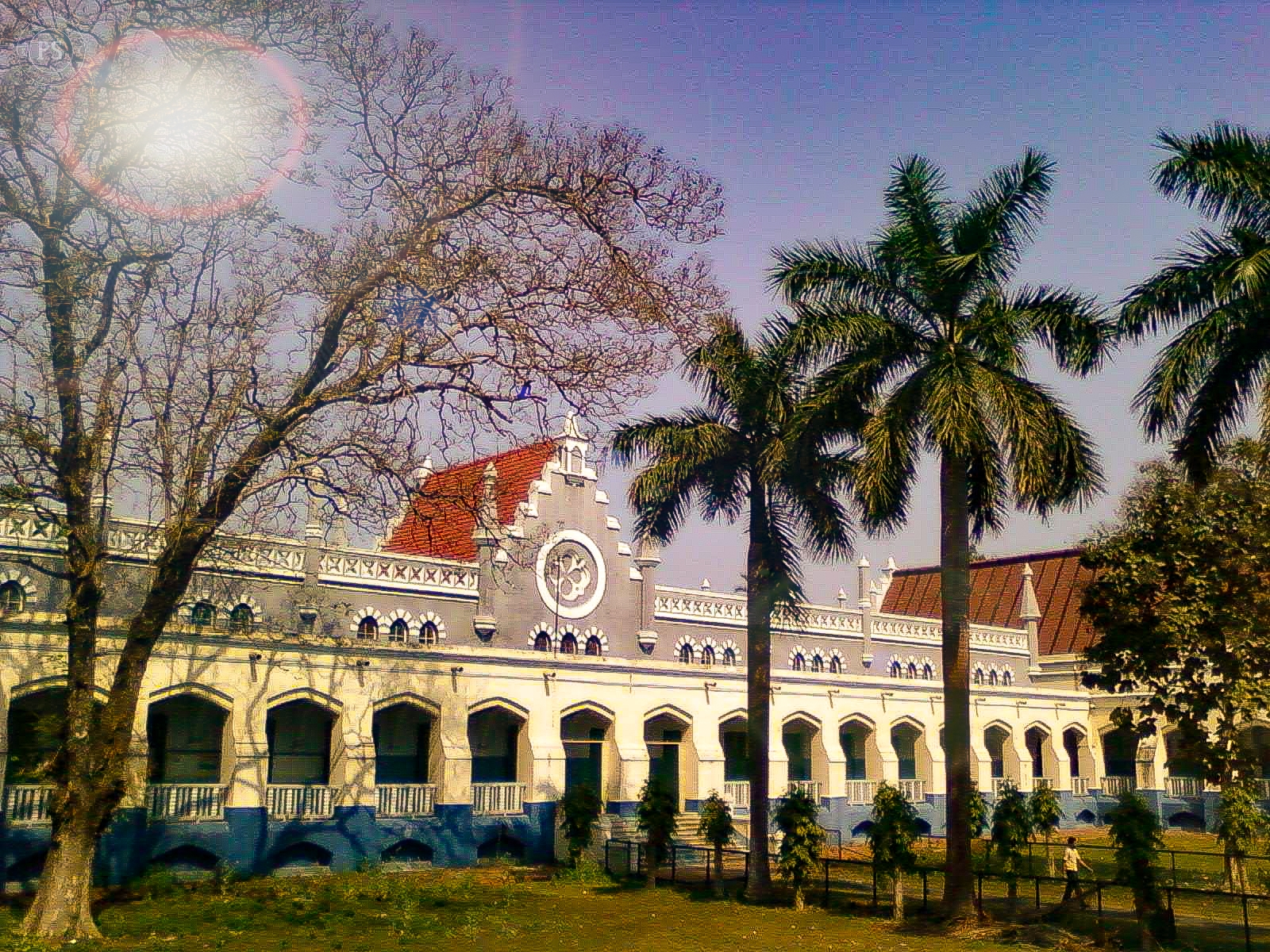
Krishnath college

The college was established in 1853 by Maharani Swarnamoyee Devi. The college was named for her husband, Maharaja Krishnath Roy of Cossimbazar. In 1841, Maharaja Krishnath received his zamindary (a jurisdiction assigned to a zamindar) and had the dream of establishing an academic institution. Following her husband's death, Swarnamoyee gave as a gift both land and money, saving the college from financial crisis. Mr. Harrison became the first principal of the college. The famous Indian Scholar and writer Brajendra Nath Seal developed the infrastructure of the college.

== Organisation and administration ==
=== Governance ===
The Vice-chancellor of the Murshidabad University is the chief executive officer of the university.

List of All Vice-Chancellors
No.	Name
1.	Sujata Bagchi (Banerjee)
2.	Mita Banerjee
3.	Rup Kumar Barman
4.	Achintya Saha
5.	Jane Alam (present)

== Faculties and departments ==
Murshidabad University has 16 departments organized into three faculties: Science, Arts, and Social Science for B. A, M. A, B. Sc, M. Sc, Ba. Llb, Ma.Llb.and Ph. D.

Faculties and Departments
Faculty	Departments
Faculty of Science	Botany, Physics, Chemistry, Mathematics, Geography, Zoology, Physiology, Sericulture
Faculty of Arts	Arabic, Bengali, English, Sanskrit, Santali
Faculty of Social Science	Education, History, Political Science, Philosophy
Faculty of Law	Law

=== Accreditation ===
In 2016 Krishnath College was awarded an 'A' grade by the National Assessment and Accreditation Council (NAAC). The college is recognized by the University Grants Commission (India) (UGC). It is built on the structure of Oxford University.

== Notable alumni ==
=== Krishnath College ===
- Surya Sen, Leading Revolutionary in British India
- Ritwik Ghatak, filmmaker and script writer
- Nikunja Behari Maiti, freedom fighter, Member of Lok Sabha, first education minister of West Bengal
- Babar Ali, Member of West Bengal Legislative Assembly (Jalangi) ,youngest headmaster in the world by BBC in October 2009, at the age of 16.
- Sudip Bandyopadhyay, Member of Lok Sabha
- Abul Barkat, Bhasa Saheed (1952, Dhaka)
- Benimadhab Barua, Indian Bengali Scholar, first Asian D.Litt.
- P. C. Bose, Independence activist and politician
- Tridib Chaudhuri, Nationalist politician, freedom fighter and former Member of Lok Sabha
- Atulkrishna Ghosh, Indian freedom fighter
- Moinul Hassan, A member of Rajya Sabha and a Communist politician
- Nalinaksha Sanyal, Politician, Economist
- Amarendra Nath Sen, Chief Justice of the Calcutta High Court
- Renu Pada Das, Indian politician
- Rai Sahib Nagendra Kumar Bhattacharyya Criminal lawyer and politician
- Subrata Maitra, MLA from Baharampur

== Gallery ==
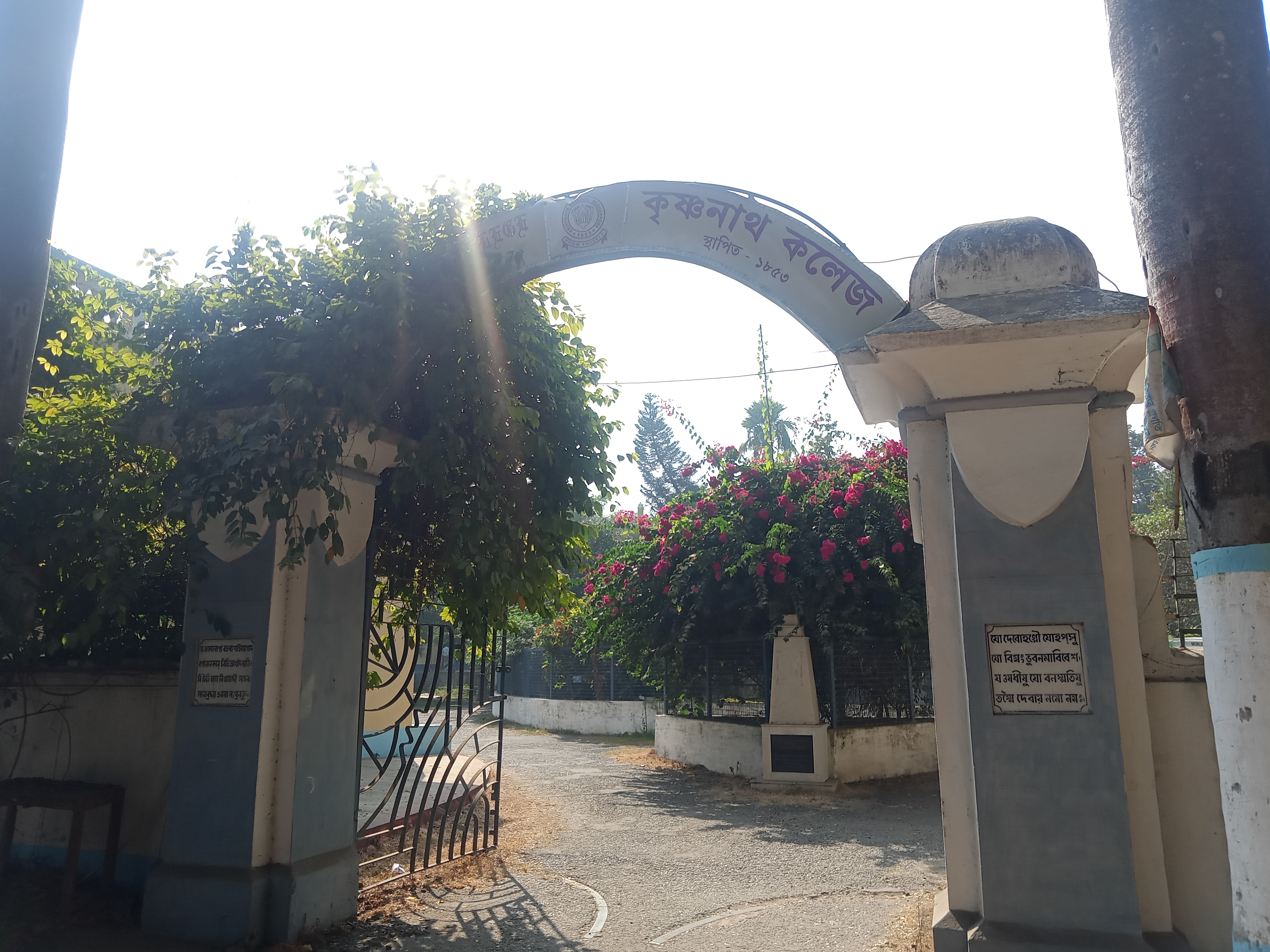

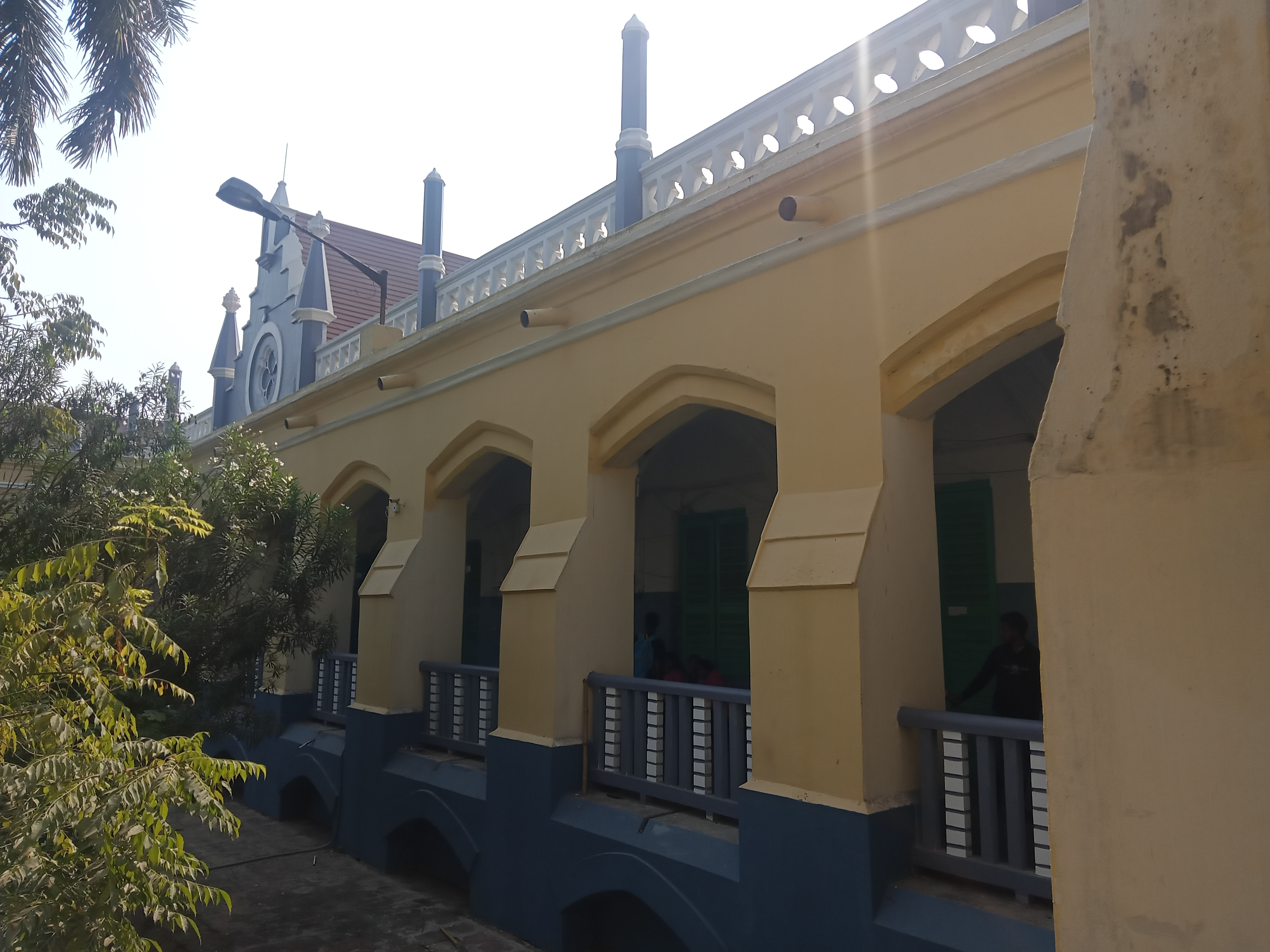

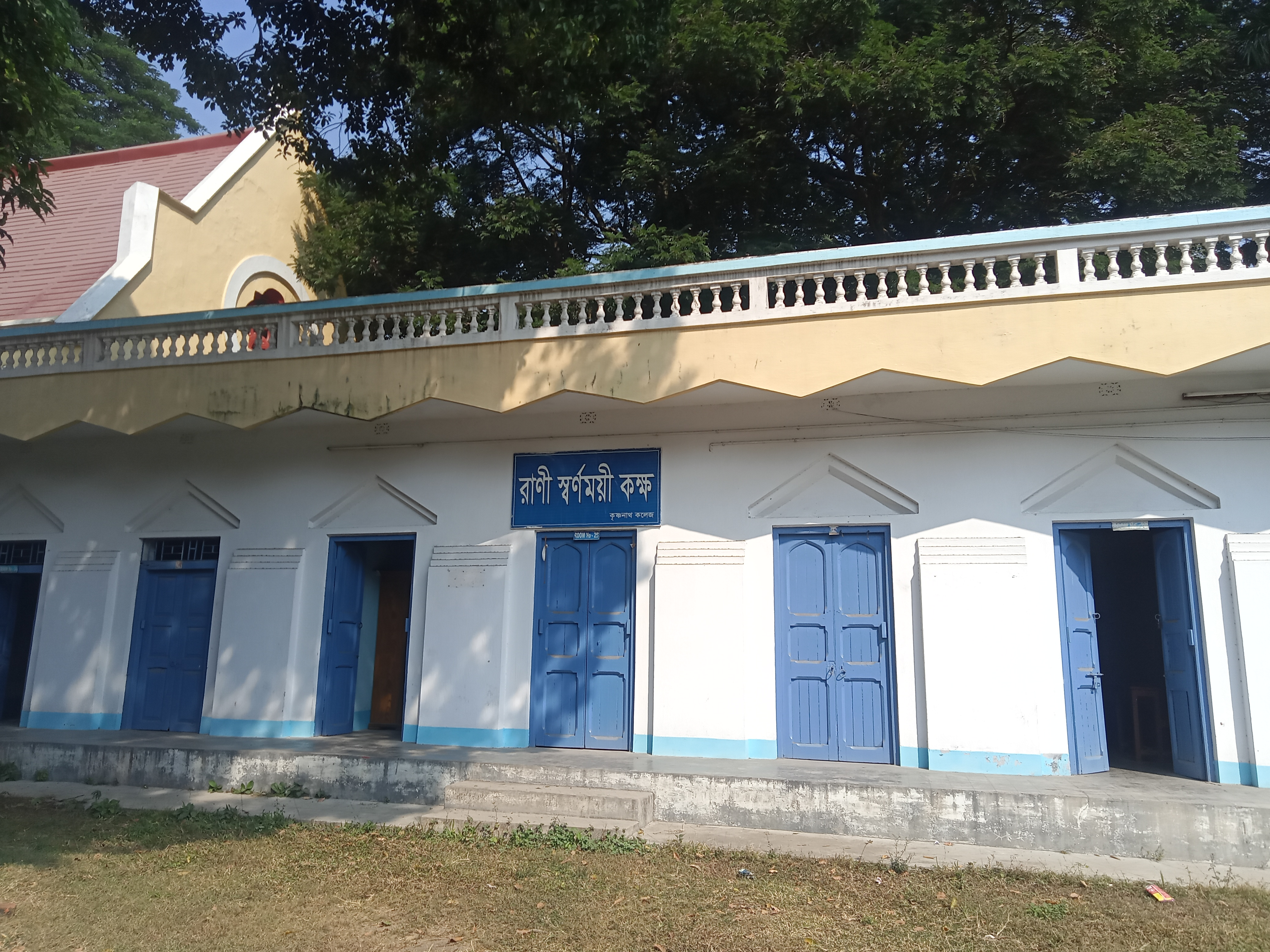

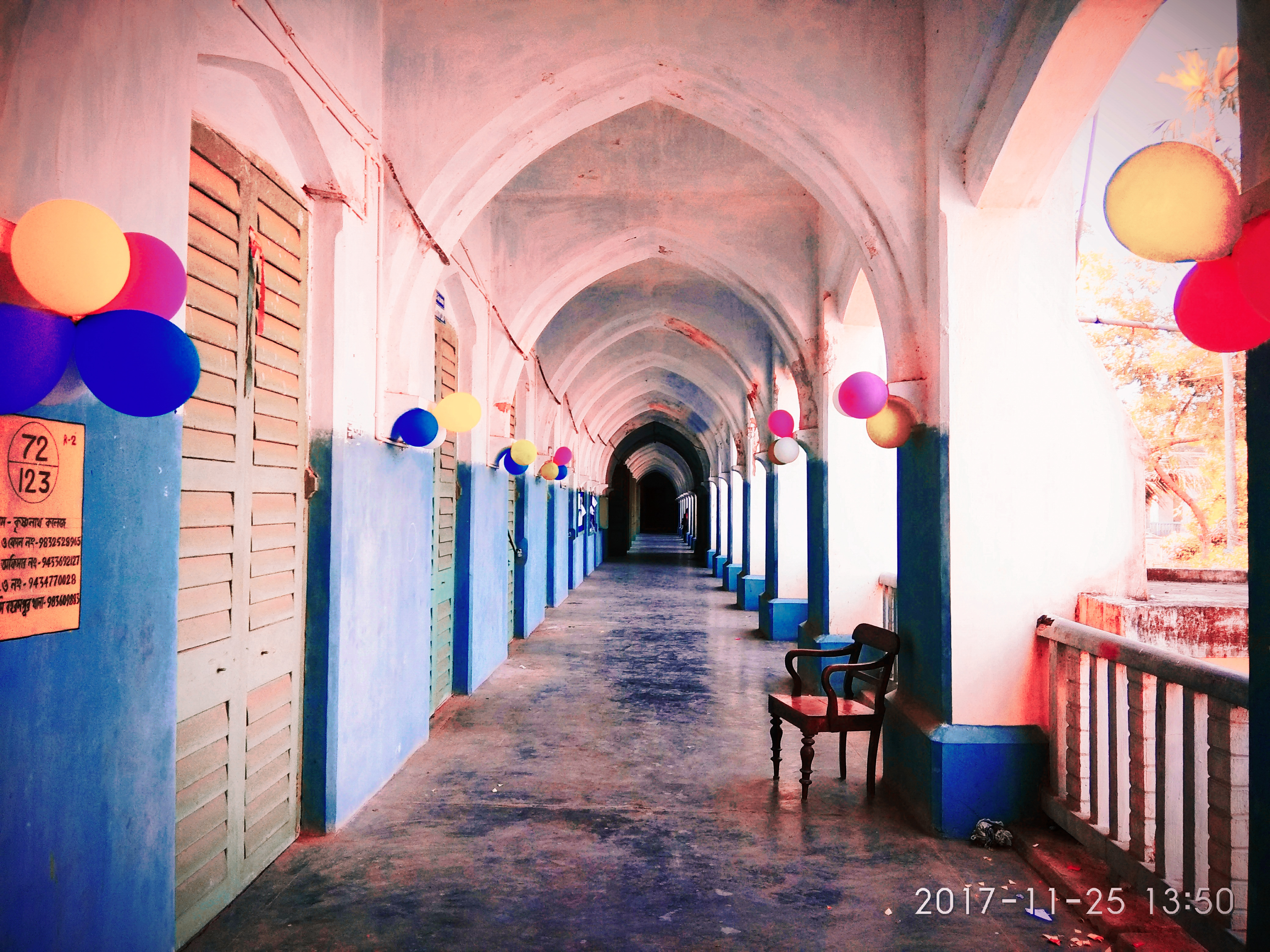

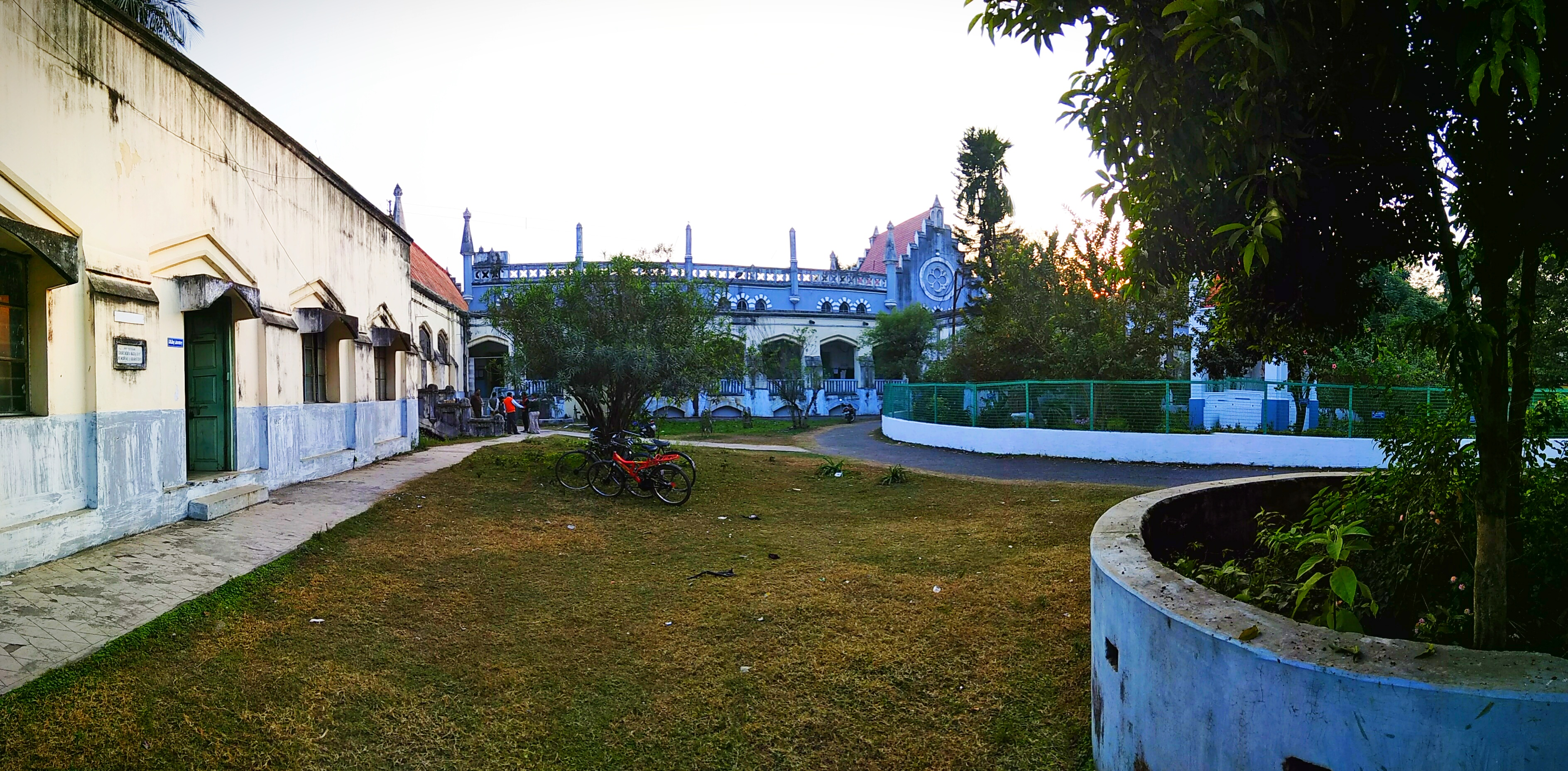

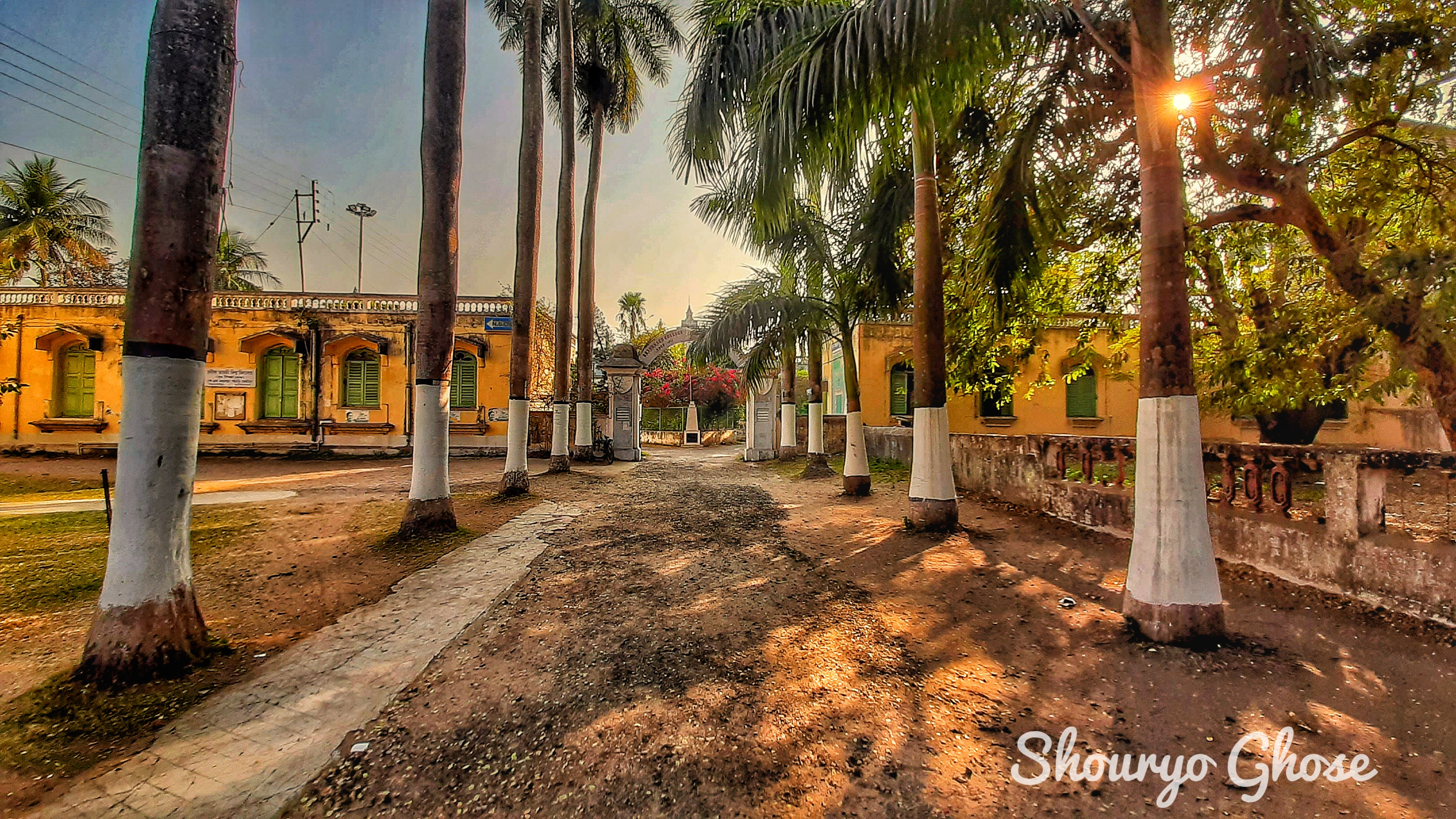

== See also ==
- List of institutions of higher education in West Bengal
  - List of universities in West Bengal
- Education in India
  - Education in West Bengal
