= St. Mary Armenian Church, Saidabad =

Church in West Bengal, India

St. Mary Church Սուրբ Աստվածածին Եկեղեցի
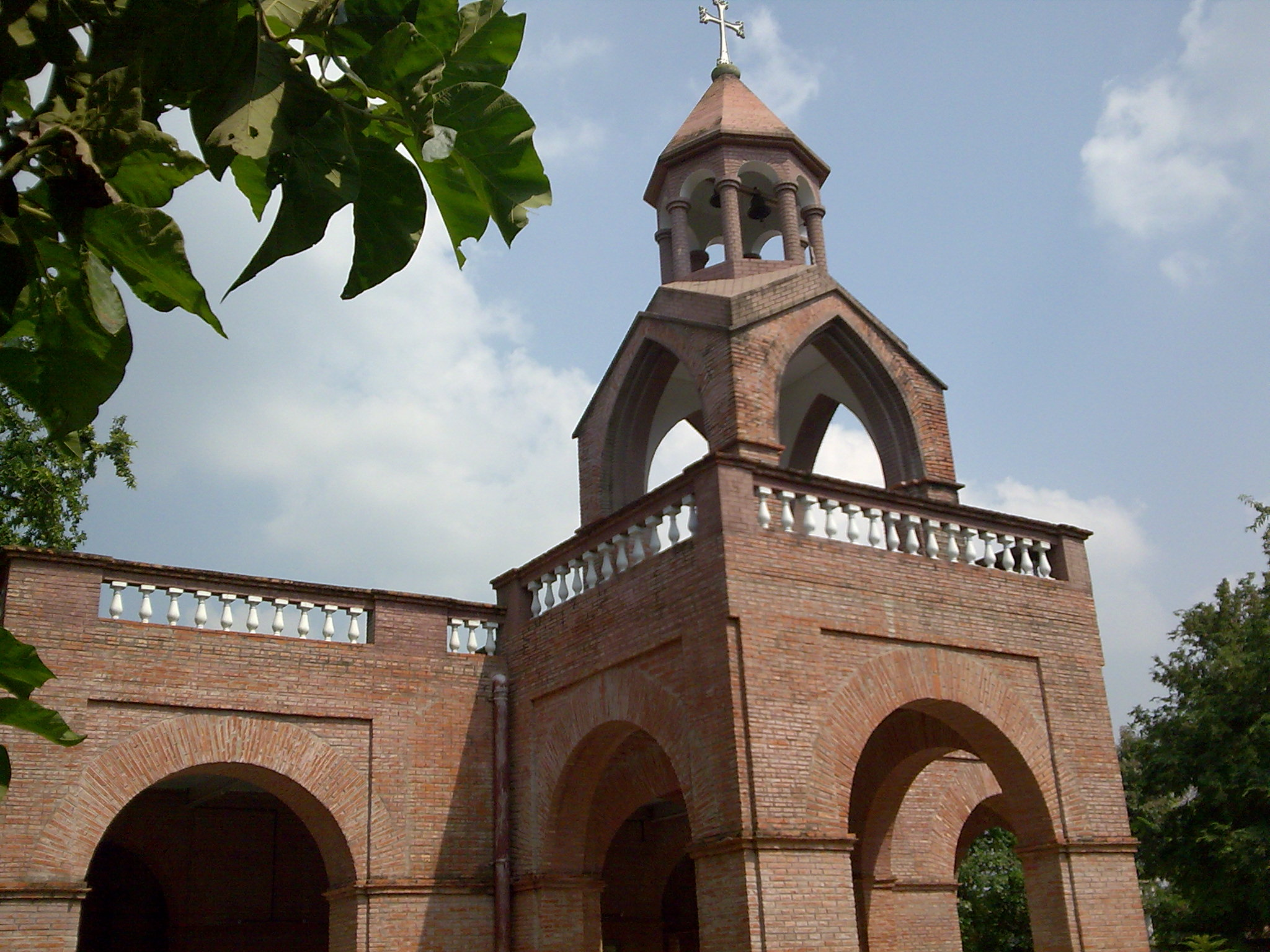
- St. Mary Church, Saidabad

- Location within India

Religion
- Affiliation: Armenian Apostolic Church
- Rite: Armenian

Location
- Location: Saidabad, Cossimbazar, West Bengal; India
- Coordinates: 24.12225649°N 88.25771213°E

Architecture
- Style: Armenian
- Completed: 1758

Saint Mary Church of Saidabad, (Armenian: Սուրբ Աստվածածին Եկեղեցի) is a parish of the Armenian Apostolic Church situated at Saidabad, Cossimbazar near Baharampur in Murshidabad district in the Indian state of West Bengal. It is dedicated to Mary, mother of Jesus.

== History ==
The St. Mary church was built by Khoja Petros Arathoon in 1757–58 at his own expense in memory of his parents and brothers. He was at the time the head of the Armenian community in Kolkata. The cost of the building of it was two lakh and thirty six thousand rupees.

An Armenian merchant and founder of the Armenian Philanthropic Academy, Manatsaken Vardon, lived at Saidabad. After his death on 13 October 1827 he was buried in this church.

The church closed in 1860. In 2006, it was re-consecrated after a major renovation initiated in 2005 by the Armenian Church community of Kolkata.
