= Mozammel Hossain Lalu =

Bangladeshi politician

- মোজাম্মেল হোসেন লালু

Member of Parliament for Kurigram-3
- In office September 1996 – 13 July 2001
- Preceded by: Hussain Muhammad Ershad
- Succeeded by: Md. Motiur Rahman

Personal details
- Born: 1942 Bengal Province
- Died: 1 September 2014 (aged 72) Rangpur, Bangladesh
- Party: Jatiya Party (Ershad)
- Children: Hossain Mokbul Shahriar (son)
- Relatives: HM Ershad (brother); GM Quader (brother); Merina Rahman (sister); Sharifa Quader (sister-in-law)

Mozammel Hossain Lalu (Bengali: মোজাম্মেল হোসেন লালু; 1942 – 1 September 2014) was a Bangladeshi politician. He was elected a Jatiya Sangsad member from Kurigram-3 (Ulipur-Chilmari-Rajarhat) constituency winning the September 1996 by-election.

== Early life and family ==
Lalu was born in the early 1940s to a Bengali Muslim family with roots in Dinhata in present-day India. His parents were Mokbul Hossain and Majida Khatun. Mokbul was a lawyer and served as a minister of the erstwhile Maharaja of Cooch Behar. Lalu had eight siblings including the former President of Bangladesh Hussain Muhammad Ershad, politician GM Quader and Merina Rahman. Lalu's son, Hossain Mokbul Shahriar, is a former Jatiya Sangsad member from Rangpur-1.

== Career ==
Lalu served as the assistant general manager of the state-run Janata Bank. Following the arrest of his elder brother Hussain Muhammad Ershad in 1990, Lalu founded and chaired the Free Ershad Council. Lalu was also the cooperative advisor for the Jatiya Party's Central Committee.
