= Cossimbazar =

Cossimbazar Kasim Bazar
- Census Town
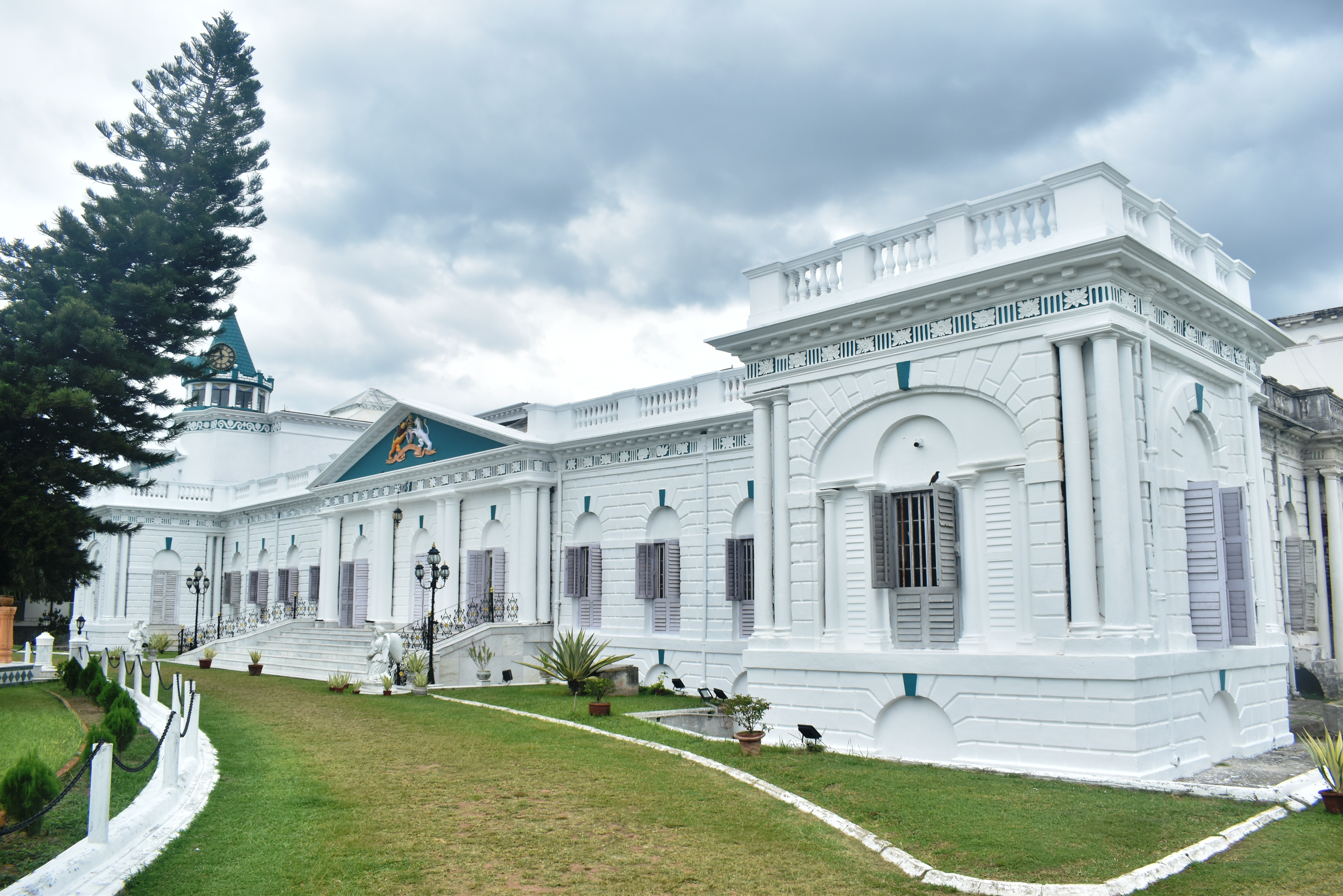
- Cossimbazar Palace

- Location in West Bengal, India Cossimbazar (India)
- Coordinates: 24.12°N 88.28°E
- Country: India
- State: West Bengal
- District: Murshidabad
- Elevation: 17 m (56 ft)

Population (2011)
  - Total: 10,175

Languages
  - Official: Bengali, English
- Time zone: UTC+5:30 (IST)
- Vehicle registration: WB
- Lok Sabha constituency: Baharampur
- Vidhan Sabha constituency: Baharampur

Cossimbazar is a sub-urban area of Berhampore city in the Berhampore CD block in the Berhampore subdivision of Murshidabad district in the Indian state of West Bengal.

== Name ==
According to Irfan Habib, Qāsimbāzār is probably named after Qāsim Khān, who was governor of Bengal Subah early during the reign of Shah Jahan.

== Demographics ==
According to the 2011 Census of India, Kasim Bazar had a total population of 11,724, of which 5,978 (51%) were males and 5,746 (49%) were females. Population in the age range 0–6 years was 981. The total number of literate persons in Kasim Bazar was 9,872 (91.89% of the population over 6 years).

As of 2001 India census, Kasim Bazar had a population of 10,175. Males constitute 52% of the population and females 48%. Kasim Bazar has an average literacy rate of 78%, higher than the national average of 59.5%: male literacy is 83%, and female literacy is 72%. In Kasim Bazar, 9% of the population is under 6 years of age.

== Geography ==
Cities, towns and locations in the Berhampore and Kandi subdivisions, Murshidabad district
M: municipal town, CT: census town, R: rural/ urban centre, H: historical centres
Owing to space constraints in the small map, the actual locations in a larger map may vary slightly

=== Location ===
Cossimbazar is located at 24.12°N 88.28°E. It has an average elevation of 17 metres (56 feet).

=== Area overview ===
The area shown in the map alongside, covering Berhampore and Kandi subdivisions, is spread across both the natural physiographic regions of the district, Rarh and Bagri. The headquarters of Murshidabad district, Berhampore, is in this area. The ruins of Karnasubarna, the capital of Shashanka, the first important king of ancient Bengal who ruled in the 7th century, is located 9.6 kilometres (6.0 mi) south-west of Berhampore. The entire area is overwhelmingly rural with over 80% of the population living in the rural areas.

Note: The map alongside presents some of the notable locations in the subdivisions. All places marked in the map are linked in the larger full screen map.

== History ==
Though the history of the place cannot be traced back earlier than the 17th century, it was of great importance long before the foundation of Murshidabad. The first European traders set up factories here, and after the ruin of Satgaon due to the silting up of the mouth of the Saraswati river, it gained a position as the great trading centre of Bengal, which was not challenged until after the foundation of Calcutta.

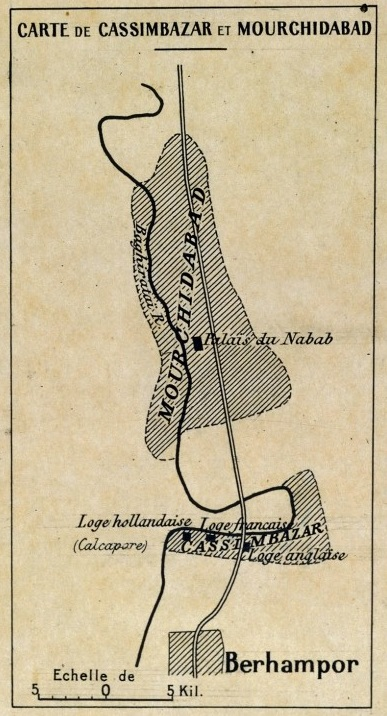
Cossimbazar and Murshidabad in the mid-18th century

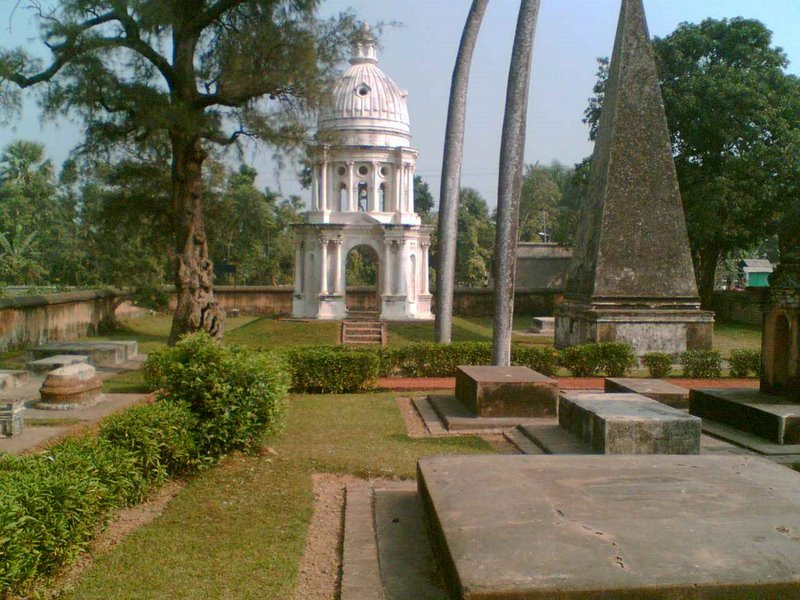
The Dutch cemetery in Cossimbazar.

The English, Dutch and French East India companies all maintained factories at Cossimbazar. In 1658 the first English agency of the East India Company (EIC) was established there, and in 1667 the chief of the factory there became an ex officio member of council. In English documents of this period, and till the early 19th century, the Hooghly River was described as the "Cossimbazar river", and the triangular piece of land between the Hooghly, Padma and Jalangi, on which the city stands, as the island of Cossimbazar. The proximity of the factory to Murshidabad, the capital of the Nawabs of Bengal, while it was the main source of its wealth and of its political importance, exposed it to a constant risk of attack. Thus in 1757 it was the first EIC factory to be taken by Siraj-ud-dowlah, the Nawab; and the resident with his assistant Warren Hastings were taken as prisoners to Murshidabad.

The town was the seat of the Maharajas of Cossimbazar. The maharajas were descendants of Kanta Babu, the moneylender (banian) of Warren Hastings, who was governor-general of Bengal from 1773 to 1785. The maharajas built a fine palace in Cossimbazar, portions of which were made of carved stone taken from the palace of Chait Singh, Maharaja of Benares. Maharaja Sir Manindra Chandra Nandy (1860–1929) was a philanthropist and patron of education who figured in the Bengal Renaissance.

At the beginning of the 19th century, the city still flourished; as late as 1811 it was described as famous for its silks, hosiery, koras and beautiful ivory work. However, its once healthy climate gradually worsened, and, probably because of endemic malaria, the area of cultivated land round it shrank drastically. Jungle took its place, and in 1813 its ruin was completed by a sudden change in the course of the Hoogly. A new channel formed 3 miles from the old town, leaving an evil-smelling swamp around the ancient wharves. In 1829, a census recorded the population as 3,538. Of its splendid buildings the fine palace of the Maharaja of Cossimbazar alone remained, the rest being in ruins or represented only by great mounds of earth. The first wife of Warren Hastings was buried at Cossimbazar, where her tomb with its inscription still remained till the early 20th century. In 1901 its population was just 1,262.

== Infrastructure ==
According to the District Census Handbook, Murshidabad, 2011, Kasim Bazar covered an area of 2.78 km^{2} (1.07 sq mi). x had 5 km roads with open drains. The protected water-supply involved overhead tank, tank/pond/lake, hand pump. It had 2,500 domestic electric connections, 300 road lighting points. Among the medical facilities it had 3 medicine shops. Among the educational facilities, it had 3 primary schools, 2 senior secondary schools, 1 engineering college. It had 1 recognised shorthand, typewriting & vocational training institute. It had branch offices of 1 nationalised bank, 1 cooperative bank.

== Places of interest ==
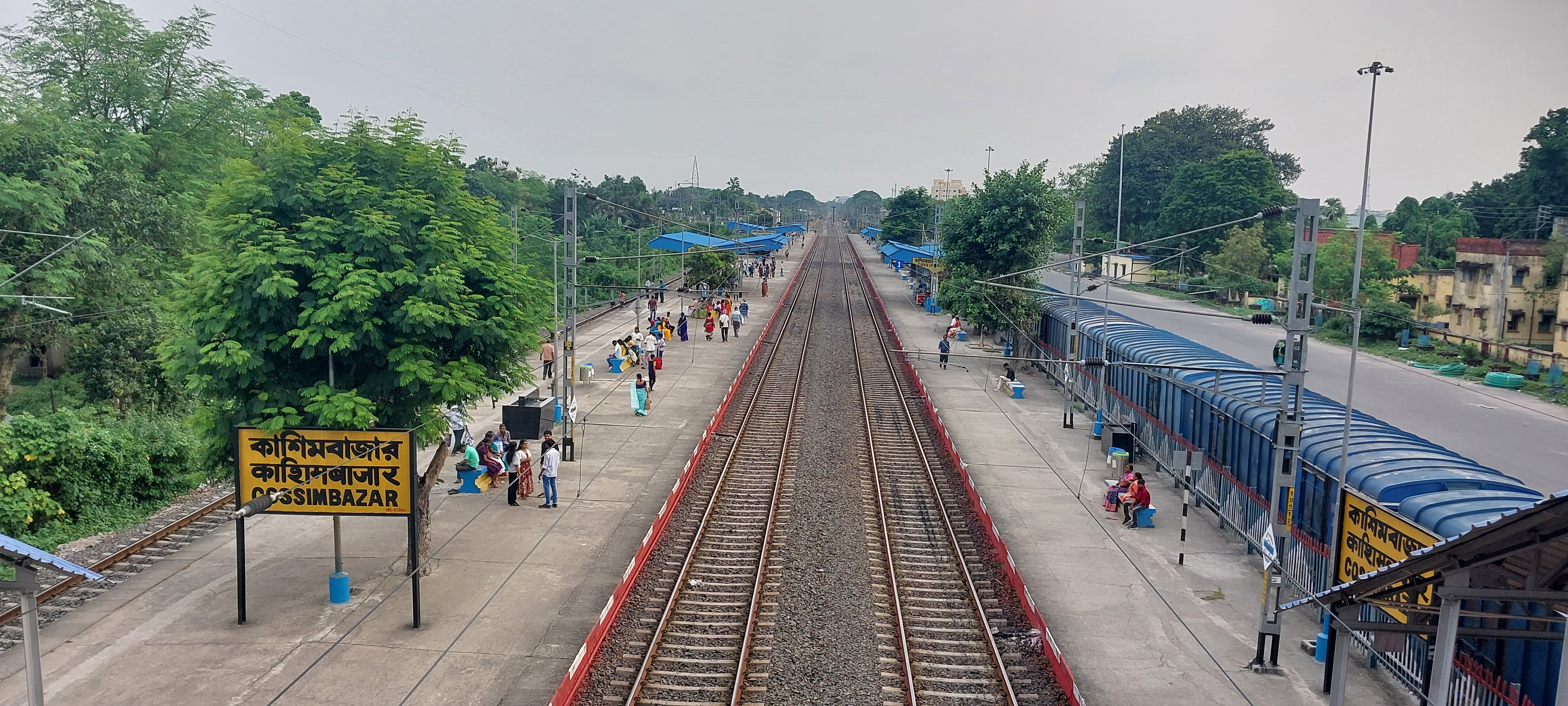
Cossimbazar railway station

Cossimbazar is a historic town and predates Murshidabad. It houses two Christian cemeteries, an Armenian Church and two colonial styled mansions of local landlords one of which have been converted into a heritage hotel. By the middle of the 16th century, Dutch, French and British had already established their trading posts (often referred to as factories) in Cossimbazar. The trading community like the Armenians also had there presence.

- Dutch Cemetery, Murshidabad: The dutch cemetery is located next to the Cossimbazar railway station. It once had 47 graves out of which only 20 stands to this day. The oldest grave is of Daniel van der Muy and dates back to 1721. Most of the graves are of obelisks style but a few are topped with domes. The white domed tomb of Tammerus Canter Visscher stands out among the other tombs.
- British Cemetery, Cossimbazar: This cemetery is even smaller than the Dutch cemetery. It contains the graves of British officials and their family members who died in Cossimbazar after the Battle of Plassey. The cemetery houses the grave of Warren Hastings' first wife Mary and their infant daughter Elizabeth.
- Palace of the Roys:
- Palace of the Nandis:
- St. Mary's Armenian Church: The prominent trading community of Armenians also had a large presence in Cossimbazar. In 1758 the Armenians came up with their own church, St. Mary's Church. After the fall in the business activities of Cossimbazar the Armenians left their town leaving their church behind. The last sermon at the church was held here in 1860. In 2005, the Armenian Church Committee of Kolkata restored the church to its former glory and also added a clock tower. Today the church is well maintained and is surrounded by a small well maintained garden.

== Transport ==
Cossimbazar is the railway connection of Cossimbazar, situated on the Sealdah–Lalgola line of the Eastern Railway.
