= Union councils of Nilphamari District =

Union councils of Nilphamari District (Bengali: নীলফামারী জেলার ইউনিয়ন পরিষদসমূহ) are the smallest rural administrative and local government units in Nilphamari District of Bangladesh. The district consists of 4 municipalities, 6 upazilas, 60 union porishods, mouza 370 and 378 villages.

== Dimla Upazila ==
The union parishads are subdivided into 53 mauzas and 53 villages. Dimla Upazila is divided into ten union parishads:

- Paschim Chhatnay Union
- Balapara Union
- Dimla Union
- Khoga Kharibari Union
- Gayabari Union
- Nautara Union
- Khalisha Chapani Union
- Jhunagachh Chapani Union
- Tepa Kharibari Union
- Purba Chhatnay Union

== Domar Upazila ==
Domar thana was formed in 1875 and it was turned into an upazila in 1984. It was under Dimla thana before 1875. The union parishads are subdivided into 47 mauzas and 47 villages.

Domar Upazila is divided into Domar Municipality and ten union parishads:

- Bamunia Union
- Bhogdaburi Union
- Boragari Union
- Domar Union
- Gomnati Union
- Harinchara Union
- Jorabari Union
- Ketkibari Union
- Panga Motukpur Union
- Sonaray Union

== Jaldhaka Upazila ==
Jaldhaka Thana was formed in 1911 and it was turned into an upazila in 1983. It was under Dimla thana before 1911. Jaldhaka Municipality is subdivided into 9 wards and 15 mahallas. The union parishads are subdivided into 69 mauzas and 61 villages.

The upazila is divided into Jaldhaka Municipality and 11 union parishads namely:

- Balagram Union
- Dharmapal Union
- Douabari Union
- Golna Union
- Golmunda Union
- Kaimari Union
- Kathali Union
- Khutamara Union
- Mirganj Union
- Shaulmari Union
- Shimulbari Union

== Kishoreganj Upazila ==
Kishoreganj Thana, now an upazila, was formed in 1921. Kishoreganj was part of Dimla thana of Nilphamari Mohokuma before becoming a separate thana. The union parishads are subdivided into 51 mauzas and 53 villages.

Kishoreganj Upazila is divided into nine union parishads:

- Bahagili Union
- Barabhita Union
- Chandkhana Union
- Garagram Union
- Kishoreganj Union
- Magura Union
- Nitai Union
- Putimari Union
- Ranachandi Union

== Nilphamari Sadar Upazila ==
Nilphamari Thana was formed in 1870 and it was turned into an upazila in 1984. The union parishads are subdivided into 109 mauzas and 108 villages.

Nilphamari Sadar Upazila is divided into Nilphamari Municipality and 15 union parishads:

- Chaora Bargacha Union
- Chapra Saranjani Union
- Charaikhola Union
- Gorgram Union
- Itakhola Union
- Kachukata Union
- Khoksabari Union
- Kundapukur Union
- Lakshmichap Union
- Palasbari Union
- Ramnagar Union
- Songalsi Union
- Sonaray Union
- Tupamari Union

== Saidpur Upazila ==
Saidpur Upazila is divided into 1 municipality and Saidpur Municipality is subdivided into 15 wards and 43 mahallas. The union parishads are subdivided into 42 mauzas and 39 villages.

There are six union parishads:

- Bangalipur
- Botlagari Union
- Kamarpukur Union
- Kasirambelpukur Union
- Khatamadhupur Union
- Saidpur Cantonment.
