= Anwarul Kabir Chowdhury =

Bangladeshi politician

- আনোয়ারুল কবির চৌধুরী

Member of Parliament for Nilphamari-3
- In office 15 February 1996 – 12 June 1996
- Preceded by: Md. Azaharul Islam
- Succeeded by: Mizanur Rahman Chowdhury

Personal details
- Born: Nilphamari District
- Party: Bangladesh Nationalist Party

Anwarul Kabir Chowdhury is a Bangladeshi politician and former member of parliament for the Nilphamari-3 constituency in February 1996.

== Career ==
Chowdhury was a member of the Jatiya Samajtantrik Dal before joining the Bangladesh Nationalist Party (BNP). He was elected to parliament from Nilphamari-3 as a BNP candidate in the 15 February 1996 Bangladeshi general election.

As of 2004, Chowdhury was president of the Jaldhaka Upazila unit of the BNP and municipal chairman of Jaldhaka. He sought to stand for Nilphamari-3 in the 2008 Bangladeshi general election, but the Election Commission cancelled his nomination for containing errors.
