= Nilphamari-3 =

Constituency of Bangladesh's Jatiya Sangsad

Coordinates: 26.02°N 89.02°E

- Constituency for the Jatiya Sangsad
- District: Nilphamari District
- Division: Rangpur Division
- Electorate: 294,446 (2026)

Current constituency
- Created: 1984
- Party: Bangladesh Jamaat-e-Islami
- Member: Obaidullah Salafi
- ← 13 Nilphamari-2 15 Nilphamari-4 →

Nilphamari-3 is a constituency represented in the Jatiya Sangsad (National Parliament) of Bangladesh since 2026 by Obaidullah Salafi of the Bangladesh Jamaat-e-Islami.

== Boundaries ==
The constituency encompasses Jaldhaka Upazila.

== History ==
The constituency was created in 1984 from a Rangpur constituency when the former Rangpur District was split into five districts: Nilphamari, Lalmonirhat, Rangpur, Kurigram, and Gaibandha.

Ahead of the 2018 general election, the Election Commission altered the boundaries of the constituency. Previously it included three union parishads of Kishoreganj Upazila: Barabhita, Putimari, and Ranachandi.

== Members of Parliament ==
Election	Member	Party
1986	Joban Uddin Ahmad	Bangladesh Jamaat-e-Islami
1988	MK Alam Chowdhury	Jatiya Party
1991	Md. Azaharul Islam	Awami League
Feb 1996	Anwarul Kabir Chowdhury	Bangladesh Nationalist Party
Jun 1996	Mizanur Rahman Chowdhury	Bangladesh Jamaat-e-Islami
2008	Kazi Faruque Kader	Jatiya Party (Ershad)
2014	Golam Mostofa	Awami League
2018	Rana Mohammad Sohel	Jatiya Party (Ershad)
2024	Saddam Hussain Pavel	Independent
2026	Obaidullah Salafi	Bangladesh Jamaat-e-Islami

== Elections ==
=== Elections in the 2020s ===
General election 2026: Nilphamari-3
Party	Candidate	Votes	%	±%
Jamaat	Obaidullah Salafi	108,560		
BNP	Alhaj Syed Ali	89,102		
Majority		19,458		
Turnout				
Registered electors		294,446		
Jamaat gain from Independent				

=== Elections in the 2010s ===
General Election 2014: Nilphamari-3
Party	Candidate	Votes	%	±%
AL	Golam Mostofa	78,919	79.5	N/A
JP(E)	Kazi Faruque Kader	20,345	20.5	−47.6
Majority		58,574	59.0	+22.2
Turnout		99,264	38.0	−53.2
AL gain from JP(E)				

=== Elections in the 2000s ===
General Election 2008: Nilphamari-3
Party	Candidate	Votes	%	±%
JP(E)	Kazi Faruque Kader	145,688	68.1	N/A
Jamaat	Azizul Islam	66,849	31.2	−6.8
IAB	Md. Abdul Monayem	1,549	0.7	N/A
Majority		78,839	36.8	+31.4
Turnout		214,086	91.2	+9.2
JP(E) gain from Jamaat				

General Election 2001: Nilphamari-3
Party	Candidate	Votes	%	±%
Jamaat	Mizanur Rahman Chowdhury	64,180	38.0	+6.7
AL	Dipendra Nath Sarkar	55,043	32.6	N/A
IJOF	Rashidul Alam Chowdhury	44,014	26.1	N/A
Jatiya Party (M)	Md. Kazi Nurannabi	4,081	2.4	N/A
CPB	Md. Jahed Ali	552	0.3	−0.2
JSD	Azizul Islam	496	0.3	N/A
Independent	A. K. Nazrul Haque	388	0.2	N/A
Majority		9,137	5.4	+3.3
Turnout		168,754	82.0	+11.2
Jamaat hold				

=== Elections in the 1990s ===
General Election June 1996: Nilphamari-3
Party	Candidate	Votes	%	±%
Jamaat	Mizanur Rahman Chowdhury	37,546	31.3	+5.5
JP(E)	Rashidul Alam Chowdhury	35,030	29.2	+2.2
AL	Md. Azharul Islam	34,439	28.7	−4.6
BNP	Anwarul Kabir Chowdhury	8,702	7.3	+2.3
Samridhya Bangladesh Andolan	Md. Kamrul Alam Kabir	1,810	1.5	N/A
Gano Forum	Md. Abdul Hakim	731	0.6	N/A
CPB	Md. Jahed Ali	577	0.5	N/A
Independent	Md. Abdul Gafur	572	0.5	N/A
Zaker Party	Md. Mozaffor Hossain	446	0.4	+0.1
Majority		2,516	2.1	−4.2
Turnout		119,853	70.8	+12.1
Jamaat gain from AL				

General Election 1991: Nilphamari-3
Party	Candidate	Votes	%	±%
AL	Md. Azaharul Islam	37,131	33.3	
JP(E)	Md. Nurul Haq	30,064	27.0	
Jamaat	Joban Uddin Ahmad	28,806	25.8	
BNP	Md. Mominur Rahman Chowdhury	5,538	5.0	
Bangladesh Muslim League (Kader)	Kazi Abdul Kader	4,834	4.3	
Independent	Md. Kamrul Alam Kabir	3,414	3.1	
BAKSAL	Md. Nuruzzaman	1,076	1.0	
Zaker Party	Md. Abdur Rouf Pramanik	446	0.3	
Independent	Md. Hamidul Ehesan	155	0.2	
Majority		7,067	6.3	
Turnout		111,464	58.7	
AL gain from JP(E)				
