= Nilphamari-4 =

Constituency of Bangladesh's Jatiya Sangsad

Coordinates: 25.78°N 88.90°E

- Constituency for the Jatiya Sangsad
- District: Nilphamari District
- Division: Rangpur Division
- Electorate: 451,814 (2026)

Current constituency
- Created: 1984
- Party: Bangladesh Jamaat-e-Islami
- Member: Abdul Muntakim
- ← 14 Nilphamari-3 16 Lalmonirhat-1 →

Nilphamari-4 is a constituency represented in the Jatiya Sangsad (National Parliament) of Bangladesh since 2026 by Abdul Muntakim of the Bangladesh Jamaat-e-Islami.

== Boundaries ==
The constituency encompasses Saidpur and Kishoreganj Upazilas.

== History ==
The constituency was established in 1984 following the division of the former Rangpur District into five districts: Nilphamari, Lalmonirhat, Rangpur, Kurigram, and Gaibandha.

Prior to the 2018 general election, the Election Commission expanded the constituency's boundaries. Previously, it had excluded the three northernmost union parishads of Kishoreganj Upazila: Barabita, Putimari, and Ranachandi.

== Members of Parliament ==
Election	Member	Party
1986	Rowshan Ali Miah	Jatiya Party
1988	Kazi Faruque Kader	Jatiya Party
1991	Md. Abdul Hafiz	Bangladesh National Awami Party (Muzaffar)
Feb 1996	Md. Abdul Hafiz	Bangladesh Nationalist Party
Jun 1996	Asadur Rahman	Jatiya Party
2001	Amzad Hossain Sarker	Bangladesh Nationalist Party
2008	A. A. Maruf Saklain	Awami League
2014	Shawkat Chowdhury	Jatiya Party (Ershad)
2018	Ahsan Adelur Rahman	Jatiya Party (Ershad)
2024	Md Siddiqul Alam	Independent
2026	Abdul Muntakim	Bangladesh Jamaat-e-Islami

== Elections ==
=== Elections in the 2020s ===
General election 2026: Nilphamari-4
Party	Candidate	Votes	%	±%
Jamaat	Abdul Muntakim			
BNP	Md. Abdul Gafur Sarkar			
Majority				
Turnout				
Registered electors		451,814		
Jamaat gain from AL				

=== Elections in the 2010s ===
Shawkat Chowdhury was elected unopposed in the 2014 general election after opposition parties withdrew their candidacies in a boycott of the election.

=== Elections in the 2000s ===
General Election 2008: Nilphamari-4
Party	Candidate	Votes	%	±%
AL	A. A. Maruf Saklain	87,319	42.3	+9.1
JP(E)	Shawkat Chowdhury	70,044	31.3	N/A
BNP	Amzad Hossain Sarker	61,097	27.3	N/A
IAB	Md. Sadar Uddin	2,070	0.9	N/A
NAP	Monsura Rahman Jahangir Mohiuddin	332	0.1	N/A
Majority		17,275	7.7	+11.0
Turnout		224,122	91.07	+14.0
AL gain from BNP				

General Election 2001: Nilphamari-4
Party	Candidate	Votes	%	±%
BNP	Amzad Hossain Sarker	60,199	34.9	+19.7
AL	A. A. Maruf Saklain	57,285	33.2	+3.1
IJOF	Asadur Rahman	52,732	30.6	N/A
Independent	Kazi Faruque Kader	1,658	1.0	N/A
CPB	Md. Delwar Hossain	263	0.2	N/A
Bangladesh Samajtantrik Dal (Basad-Khalekuzzaman)	Md. Asbak Ahemmad	164	0.1	N/A
Independent	Md. Mokhlesur Rahman	86	0.0	N/A
Majority		2,914	1.7	−10.2
Turnout		172,387	77.7	+2.0
BNP gain from JP(E)				

=== Elections in the 1990s ===
General Election June 1996: Nilphamari-4
Party	Candidate	Votes	%	±%
JP(E)	Asadur Rahman	57,265	42.0	+7.9
AL	Md. Mokhlesur Rahman	41,053	30.1	N/A
BNP	Amzad Hossain Sarkar	20,780	15.2	+2.8
Jamaat	Md. Mozammel Haque Shah	14,043	10.3	−3.3
IOJ	Md. Nurul Islam	2,022	1.5	N/A
Zaker Party	S. M. Babul	838	0.6	−0.8
Jatiya Samajtantrik Dal-JSD	Md. Humayun Kabir	361	0.3	0.0
Majority		16,212	11.9	+11.8
Turnout		136,362	75.7	+24.1
JP(E) gain from NAP				

General Election 1991: Nilphamari-4
Party	Candidate	Votes	%	±%
NAP (Muzaffar)	Md. Abdul Hafiz	35,112	34.2	
JP(E)	Kazi Faruque Kader	35,009	34.1	
Jamaat	Md. Lutfor Rahaman	13,972	13.6	
BNP	Anisul Arefin Chowdhury	12,745	12.4	
Jatiya Oikkya Front	Md. Tajul Islam	2,704	2.6	
Zaker Party	Md. Ali Gulkhan	1,429	1.4	
Jamiat Ulema-e-Islam Bangladesh	Md. Ismael	612	0.6	
Independent	Md. Mokhlesur Rahman	550	0.5	
Jatiya Samajtantrik Dal-JSD	Md. Abu Alam	321	0.3	
Independent	Khairul Alam	155	0.2	
Majority		103	0.1	
Turnout		102,609	51.6	
NAP gain from JP(E)				
