= Md. Abdul Hafiz =

Bangladeshi politician

Mohammad Abdul Hafiz
- মুহাম্মদ আবদুল হাফিজ

Member of 5th Jatiya Sangsad
- In office 1991–1996
- Preceded by: Kazi Faruque Kader
- Succeeded by: Asadur Rahman

Personal details
- Born: December 15, 1935 (age 90) Brahmottar, Rangpur district, Bengal Presidency
- Party: National Awami Party (Muzaffar)

Mohammad Abdul Hafiz (Bengali: মুহাম্মদ আবদুল হাফিজ) is a Bangladeshi author and politician. He was the former member of parliament for Nilphamari-4.

== Early life and family ==
Abdul Hafiz was born on 15 December 1935 to Bengali Muslim parents author Ainuddin Ahmad and stay-at-home mother Begum Karimunnesa Chowdhury in the village of Brahmottar in Kamarpukur, Nilphamari, Rangpur district, Bengal Presidency. He studied at the Bakdokra Primary School, completed his madhyamik exams from Saidpur High School in 1950 and completed his uccha-madhyamik from Surendra Nath College, Dinajpur in 1952. He was married and had five children. His sons are Iftekhar Hafiz and Ishtiyaq Hafiz.

== Career ==
Hafiz was elected to parliament from Nilphamari-4 as a National Awami Party (Muzaffar) candidate in 1991.
