= Ahsan Adelur Rahman =

Bangladeshi politician (born 1979)

Member of 11th Jatiya Sangsad
- In office 30 December 2018 – 7 January 2024
- Preceded by: Shawkat Chowdhury
- Succeeded by: Siddiqul Alam Siddiq
- Constituency: Nilphamari-4

Personal details
- Born: 1 January 1979 (age 47) Kishoreganj, Nilphamari Bangladesh
- Party: Jatiya Party
- Parents: Asadur Rahman (father); Merina Rahman (mother)
- Relatives: HM Ershad, MH Lalu, GM Quader (uncles); Ziauddin Ahmed Bablu (brother-in-law); Saad Ershad, Hossain Mokbul Shahriar (cousins)

Ahsan Adelur Rahman (Bengali: আহসান আদেলুর রহমান), also simply known as Adel (Bengali: আদেল), is a Bangladeshi politician and the former member of parliament for Nilphamari-4. His maternal uncle is the former President of Bangladesh Hussain Muhammad Ershad.

== Early life and education ==
Ahsan Adelur Rahman was born in 1979 to a Bengali Muslim family in Kishoreganj, Nilphamari. His father, Asadur Rahman was formerly the vice-chancellor of Bangladesh Agricultural University, Mymensingh and the former member of parliament for the Nilphamari-4 constituency. His mother, Merina Rahman, has ancestral roots in Dinhata (present-day India) and is a politician. Ahsan Adelur Rahman's maternal grandfather, Maqbul Hossain, was a lawyer and served as a minister of the erstwhile Maharaja of Cooch Behar.

He completed his Master of Business Administration degree from the Institute of Business Administration, University of Dhaka.

== Career ==
Ahsan Adelur Rahman worked for the Dubai Islamic Bank in the United Arab Emirates. On 30 December 2018, he was elected to Parliament from Nilphamari-4 as a Jatiya Party candidate. Adel filed nomination papers for Nilphamari-4 constituency on the nomination of Jatiya Party in the eleventh parliamentary elections held on 30 December 2018. Later he was declared the candidate of the grand alliance. Adel took a symbol of langol and won a landslide victory, obtaining two lakh 36 thousand 9 and 30 votes in the election.
