= Merina Rahman =

Bangladeshi politician

- মেরিনা রহমান

Member of Parliament from Reserved Women's Seat-46
- In office January 2014 – January 2019
- Succeeded by: Nazma Akther
- In office October 2001 – October 2006

Personal details
- Born: 18 October 1943 (age 82) Comilla District, Bengal Presidency, British India
- Party: Jatiya Party
- Spouse: Asadur Rahman (m. 1965; died 2006)
- Children: 2, including Ahsan Adelur Rahman
- Relatives: HM Ershad, MH Lalu, GM Quader (brothers); Ziauddin Ahmed Bablu (son-in-law)

Merina Rahman (born 18 October 1943) is a Bangladeshi Jatiya Party politician and a former Jatiya Sangsad member from a reserved women's seat. She is the sister of former president of Bangladesh, Hussain Mohammad Ershad.

== Early life and family ==
Merina was born on 18 October 1943 in Comilla District, Bangladesh. She belongs to a Bengali Muslim family with ancestral roots in Dinhata, present-day India. Her parents were Maqbul Hossain and Majida Khatun. Maqbul was a lawyer and served as a minister of the erstwhile Maharaja of Cooch Behar. Merina has eight siblings including the former president of Bangladesh Hussain Muhammad Ershad, banker Mozammel Hossain Lalu and politician GM Quader.

In 1965, she married Asadur Rahman of Nilphamari. Their daughter Dr. Mehe Zebunnesa Rahman is the director of the BBA Program at North South University alongside being an associate professor there. She is married to Jatiya Party Member of Parliament Ziauddin Ahmed Bablu. Merina's younger son, Ahsan Adelur Rahman has been serving as a member of parliament from the Nilphamari-4 constituency from Jatiya Party (Ershad) from 30 December 2018.

== Career ==
Rahman was elected to the reserved seats for women in parliament in 2005 as a candidate of Jatiya Party. In February 2006, she and five other members of parliament from the Jatiya Party attended parliament despite the Jatiya Party decision to boycott it over what they termed unfair treatment from the deputy speaker of the parliament. She was part of the 2006 parliamentary delegation that visited the 114th Inter-Parliamentary Union conference in Kenya. She was nominated to parliament from the reserved seats for women as a candidate from the Jatiya Party in 2009. Her nomination was cancelled after the Bangladesh Election Commission found that the signature given was not authentic, due to an error on part of her sponsor. She was re-elected to the parliament from a reserved seat in 2014. She is a member of the Parliamentary Standing Committee on Ministry of Environment and Forest. She was part of a parliamentary probe committee formed on 20 March 2016 to look into recruitment activities related to the Climate Change Trust.
