= Ververy =

Village in Bangladesh

Coordinates: 25.9501°N 89.0003°E

South Ververy or Bherbheri is a small village in the north of Bangladesh under Nilphamari District and Kishoreganj Upazila. The estimated population is 20,000. The village is surrounded by small river (Dhaidan) that makes the land fertile enough for rice, potato, ginger, and other crops. The literacy rate is about 65 out of 100.

== See also ==
- List of villages in Bangladesh
