= Kazi Abdul Kader =

Bangladeshi politician

- কাজী আব্দুল কাদের

Member of the Bangladesh Parliament for Rangpur-3
- In office 1979–1982
- Leader: Shah Azizur Rahman
- Preceded by: Jonab Ali Ukil
- Succeeded by: Shafiqul Ghani Swapan

Provincial Minister for Food, Agriculture and Cooperatives of East Pakistan
- In office 1962–1965
- Governor: Abdul Monem Khan
- Preceded by: Muhammad Abdul Khaleque
- Succeeded by: Fazlul Bari

Member of the East Pakistan Provincial Assembly for PE-9 Rangpur-IX
- In office 1962
- Leader: A. T. M. Mustafa
- Preceded by: constituency created
- Succeeded by: Rustom Ali Mia

Personal details
- Born: 1916 Shaulmari, Bengal Presidency, British India
- Died: 2 October 2002 (aged 85–86) Gulshan, Dhaka, Bangladesh
- Resting place: Martyred Intellectuals graveyard, Mirpur, Dhaka
- Party: BML(K)
- Other political affiliations: BML; PMLQ; PMLC; PML; AIML
- Children: Faruque and 8 others
- Education: Carmichael College
- Occupation: politician

Kazi Abdul Kader (1916–2002) was a Bangladeshi politician. In addition to serving as a member of the Jatiya Sangsad, he served as a minister of East Pakistan and a member of the East Pakistan Provincial Assembly during the Pakistan period.

== Early life ==
Kader was born in 1916 in Shaulmari, Rangpur District, Bengal Presidency, British India (in the present-day Jaldhaka Upazila, Nilphamari District, Bangladesh). He received his education at Rangpur's Carmichael College. Alongside serving as an adviser to the Jute Committee of the Bengal Government, he also served as a director of the Provincial Cooperative Bank. He founded a school in Kaimari. He joined the Pakistan Movement in support of the demand for Pakistan. After the partition of India in 1947, he became a director of the East Pakistan Cooperative Jute Mills. He also served as vice-chairman of the Central Jute Committee and chairman of the East Pakistan Fisheries Development Corporation.

== Political career ==
Kader contested the 1962 provincial election and was elected as a member of the East Pakistan Provincial Assembly. In the same year, he was appointed Provincial Minister of Agriculture, Food and Cooperatives of East Pakistan. As under the law at the time, a minister could not simultaneously be a member of the legislature, he resigned from his membership of the Provincial Assembly, and Rustom Ali Mia was elected as the new member for his constituency through a by-election in 1963. Mosharraf Husain, the defeated candidate in the by-election, filed a petition with the Election Tribunal, alleging that Kader had used government facilities to campaign in favor of the winning candidate. When the Tribunal sought an explanation from him in 1964, Kader stated that he was innocent because the law under which he had been charged had been annulled before the by-election. However, the Tribunal found him guilty, following which he filed a writ petition in the Dhaka High Court, challenging the Tribunal's verdict. Consequently, a special bench of the High Court ruled in his favor.

In the new cabinet formed in 1965, he was appointed to the same position. His portfolio was later handed over to Fazlul Bari. Kader was a member of the ad hoc committee of the East Pakistan branch of the Convention Muslim League (PMLC). In 1966, a case was filed against him on charges of corruption during his tenure as a minister. He later joined the Qayyum Muslim League (PMLQ) and served as the chief organiser of its East Pakistan branch. During the Bangladesh Liberation War in 1971, he helped organize the anti-Bangladesh Razakar forces in Jaldhaka. He openly supported and assisted the Pakistan Army during the war. He was alleged to have been involved in the Kaliganj massacre, which took place in 17 April and in which approximately 300 people were killed. Following the independence of Bangladesh, the government of Bangladesh revoked his citizenship. He later joined the Bangladesh Muslim League (BML), founded in 1976, and was elected its president. He contested the 1979 general election from the Rangpur-3 constituency and won. Later, a faction under his leadership split from the BML and formed a separate political party.

== Personal life and death ==
Kazi Abdul Latif was Kader's brother, who joined the anti-Bangladesh Peace Committee during the war. Like his brother, Latif was also involved in the formation of the Razakar forces in Jaldhaka. Kader had seven sons and one daughter. One of his children, Kazi Faruque Kader, is a politician of the Jatiya Party (JP).

Kader died on 2 October 2002 at his residence in Gulshan, Dhaka, Bangladesh. After his death, he was buried at the Martyred Intellectuals graveyard in Mirpur, Dhaka.
