= Sonaray Union =

Sonaray Union may also refer to:

- Sonaray Union, Domar, a union in Domar Upazila
- Sonaray Union, Nilphamari Sadar, a union in Nilphamari Sadar Upazila
