= Azharul Islam =

Bangladeshi politician

- আজহারুল ইসলাম

Member of East Pakistan Provincial Assembly
- In office NA–

Member of Jatiya Sangsad
- In office 1991–1996
- Preceded by: MK Alam Chowdhury
- Succeeded by: Mizanur Rahman Chowdhury

Personal details
- Born: ১944 Barabhita, Rangpur district, Bengal Presidency
- Died: December 4, 1996 (aged 51–52) Holy Family Red Crescent Medical College Hospital, Bangladesh
- Resting place: Barabhita, Nilphamari, Bangladesh
- Party: Awami League

Mohammad Azharul Islam (Bengali: মোহম্মদ আজহারুল ইসলাম; 1944 – 4 December 1996) was a Bangladesh politician. He was a former member of parliament for Nilphamari-3.

== Early life and education ==
Islam was born in 1944 to a Bengali family of Muslim Sarkars in the village of Barabhita in Nilphamari subdivision, Rangpur district, Bengal Presidency. He was a son of Mohammad Mofeluddin Sarkar and Begum Ahatunnesa. Islam studied at the Barabhita High School and earned his degree from the Nilphamari College.

== Career ==
Islam's career began as a teacher at his alma mater, the Barabhita High School. He became active in student politics during his time at the Nilphamari College, contributing in favour of the six point movement of Sheikh Mujibur Rahman. At the age of 26, he was elected as an Awami League MPA to the Rangpur-3 constituency at the East Pakistan Provincial Assembly following the 1970 election. However, this assembly was not formed and the Bangladesh Liberation War started shortly after. Islam played a role as an organiser in his native Kishoreganj thana and served as the pradhan (chief) of the Haldibari Youth Camp. Islam was arrested a few days after the assassination of Sheikh Mujibur Rahman on 15 August 1975, spending time in prison with the four national leaders of Bangladesh.

Islam was elected to parliament from Nilphamari-3 (Jaldhaka-Kishoreganj) as an Awami League candidate following the 1991 Bangladeshi general election. He was defeated in the June 1996 Bangladeshi general election by Jamaat-e-Islami candidate Mizanur Rahman Chowdhury.

== Death ==
Islam suffered from cardiac arrest and was taken to the Holy Family Red Crescent Medical College Hospital in Dhaka where he died on 4 December 1996. He was buried in Barabhita, and left behind five daughters and two sons.
