= Botlagari Union =

Botlagari Union বোতলাগাড়ী ইউনিয়ন
- Union
- Botlagari Union
- Country: Bangladesh
- Division: Rangpur
- District: Nilphamari
- Upazila: Saidpur

Area
  - Total: 69.88 km^{2} (26.98 sq mi)

Population (2011)
  - Total: 25,150
  - Density: 359.9/km^{2} (932.1/sq mi)
- Time zone: UTC+6 (BST)
- Website: botlagariup.nilphamari.gov.bd

Botlagari Union (Bengali: বোতলাগাড়ী ইউনিয়ন) is a union parishad situated at Saidpur Upazila, in Nilphamari District, Rangpur Division of Bangladesh. The union has an area of 69.88 square kilometres (26.98 sq mi) and as of 2001 had a population of 25,150. There are 11 villages and 9 mouzas in the union.
