= Kamarpukur Union =

Kamarpukur Union কামারপুকুর ইউনিয়ন
- Union
- Kamarpukur Union
- Country: Bangladesh
- Division: Rangpur
- District: Nilphamari
- Upazila: Saidpur

Area
  - Total: 69.88 km^{2} (26.98 sq mi)

Population (2011)
  - Total: 20,362
  - Density: 291.4/km^{2} (754.7/sq mi)
- Time zone: UTC+6 (BST)
- Website: kamarpukurup.nilphamari.gov.bd

Kamarpukur Union (Bengali: কামারপুকুর ইউনিয়ন) is a union parishad situated at Saidpur Upazila, in Nilphamari District, Rangpur Division of Bangladesh. The union has an area of 69.88 square kilometres (26.98 sq mi) and as of 2001 had a population of 20,362. There are 11 villages and 11 mouzas in the union.
