= Putimari Union =

Putimari Union পুটিমারী ইউনিয়ন
- Union
- Putimari Union
- Country: Bangladesh
- Division: Rangpur
- District: Nilphamari
- Upazila: Kishoreganj

Area
  - Total: 23.00 km^{2} (8.88 sq mi)

Population (2011)
  - Total: 24,768
  - Density: 1,077/km^{2} (2,789/sq mi)
- Time zone: UTC+6 (BST)
- Website: bahagiliup.nilphamari.gov.bd

Putimari Union (Bengali: পুটিমারী ইউনিয়ন) is a union parishad situated at Kishoreganj Upazila, in Nilphamari District, Rangpur Division of Bangladesh. The union has an area of 23.00 square kilometres (8.88 sq mi) and as of 2001 had a population of 24,768. There are 8 villages and 8 mouzas in the union.
