= Dharmapal Union =

Dharmapal Union ধর্মপাল ইউনিয়ন
- Union
- Balagram Union
- Country: Bangladesh
- Division: Rangpur
- District: Nilphamari
- Upazila: Jaldhaka

Area
  - Total: 25.09 km^{2} (9.69 sq mi)

Population (2011)
  - Total: 28,866
  - Density: 1,150/km^{2} (2,980/sq mi)
- Time zone: UTC+6 (BST)
- Website: dharmapal.nilphamari.gov.bd

Dharmapal Union (Bengali: ধর্মপাল ইউনিয়ন) is a union parishad situated at Jaldhaka Upazila, in Nilphamari District, Rangpur Division of Bangladesh. The union has an area of 25.09 square kilometres (9.69 sq mi) and as of 2001 had a population of 28,866. There are 6 villages and 4 mouzas in the union.
