= Kishoreganj Union =

Kishoreganj Union কিশোরগঞ্জ ইউনিয়ন
- Union
- Kishoreganj Union
- Location within Bangladesh
- Country: Bangladesh
- Division: Rangpur
- District: Nilphamari
- Upazila: Kishoreganj

Area
  - Total: 22.99 km^{2} (8.88 sq mi)

Population (2011)
  - Total: 36,998
  - Density: 1,609/km^{2} (4,168/sq mi)
- Time zone: UTC+6 (BST)
- Website: kishoreganjup.nilphamari.gov.bd

Kishoreganj Union (Bengali: কিশোরগঞ্জ ইউনিয়ন) is a union parishad situated at Kishoreganj Upazila, in Nilphamari District, Rangpur Division of Bangladesh. The union has an area of 22.99 square kilometres (8.88 sq mi) and as of 2001 had a population of 36,998. There are 9 villages and 5 mouzas in the union.
