= Kathali Union =

Kathali Union কাঁঠালী ইউনিয়ন
- Union
- Kathali Union
- Country: Bangladesh
- Division: Rangpur
- District: Nilphamari
- Upazila: Jaldhaka

Area
  - Total: 21.71 km^{2} (8.38 sq mi)

Population (2011)
  - Total: 27,749
  - Density: 1,278/km^{2} (3,310/sq mi)
- Time zone: UTC+6 (BST)
- Website: kathaliup.nilphamari.gov.bd

Kathali Union (Bengali: কাঁঠালী ইউনিয়ন) is a union parishad situated at Jaldhaka Upazila, in Nilphamari District, Rangpur Division of Bangladesh. The union has an area of 21.71 square kilometres (8.38 sq mi) and as of 2001 had a population of 27,749. There are 4 villages and 4 mouzas in the union.
