= Barabhita Union =

Barabhita Union বড়ভিটা ইউনিয়ন
- Union
- Barabhita Union
- Country: Bangladesh
- Division: Rangpur
- District: Nilphamari
- Upazila: Kishoreganj

Area
  - Total: 22.4 km^{2} (8.6 sq mi)

Population (2011)
  - Total: 31,250
  - Density: 1,400/km^{2} (3,610/sq mi)
- Time zone: UTC+6 (BST)
- Website: barabhitaup.nilphamari.gov.bd

Barabhita Union (Bengali: বড়ভিটা ইউনিয়ন) is a union parishad situated at Kishoreganj Upazila, in Nilphamari District, Rangpur Division of Bangladesh. The union has an area of 22.4 square kilometres (8.6 sq mi) and as of 2001 had a population of 31,250. There are 4 villages and 4 mouzas in the union.
