= Khatamadhupur Union =

Khatamadhupur Union খাতামধুপুর ইউনিয়ন
- Union
- Khatamadhupur Union
- Country: Bangladesh
- Division: Rangpur
- District: Nilphamari
- Upazila: Saidpur

Area
  - Total: 29.42 km^{2} (11.36 sq mi)

Population (2011)
  - Total: 17,516
  - Density: 595.4/km^{2} (1,542/sq mi)
- Time zone: UTC+6 (BST)
- Website: kasirambelpukurup.nilphamari.gov.bd

Khatamadhupur Union (Bengali: খাতামধুপুর ইউনিয়ন) is a union parishad situated at Saidpur Upazila, in Nilphamari District, Rangpur Division of Bangladesh. The union has an area of 29.42 square kilometres (11.36 sq mi) and as of 2001 had a population of 17,516. There are 9 villages and 6 mouzas in the union.
