= Kaimari Union =

Kaimari Union কৈমারী ইউনিয়ন
- Union
- Balagram Union
- Country: Bangladesh
- Division: Rangpur
- District: Nilphamari
- Upazila: Jaldhaka

Area
  - Total: 34.6 km^{2} (13.4 sq mi)

Population (2011)
  - Total: 40,337
  - Density: 1,170/km^{2} (3,020/sq mi)
- Time zone: UTC+6 (BST)
- Website: kaimariup.nilphamari.gov.bd

Kaimari Union (Bengali: কৈমারী ইউনিয়ন) is a union parishad situated at Jaldhaka Upazila, in Nilphamari District, Rangpur Division of Bangladesh. The union has an area of 34.6 square kilometres (13.4 sq mi) and as of 2001 had a population of 40,337. There are 22 villages and 12 mouzas in the union.
