= Golna Union =

Golna Union গোলনা ইউনিয়ন
- Union
- GolnaUnion
- Country: Bangladesh
- Division: Rangpur
- District: Nilphamari
- Upazila: Jaldhaka

Area
  - Total: 30.5 km^{2} (11.8 sq mi)

Population (2011)
  - Total: 34,414
  - Density: 1,130/km^{2} (2,920/sq mi)
- Time zone: UTC+6 (BST)
- Website: golna.nilphamari.gov.bd

Golna Union (Bengali: গোলনা ইউনিয়ন) is a union parishad situated at Jaldhaka Upazila, in Nilphamari District, Rangpur Division of Bangladesh. The union has an area of 30.5 square kilometres (11.8 sq mi) and as of 2001 had a population of 34,414. There are 8 villages and 4 mouzas in the union.
