= Kaliganj massacre =

Coordinates: 26.0736°N 88.9558°E

Kaliganj massacre কালিগঞ্জ গণহত্যা
- Part of Bangladesh genocide
- Location: Kaliganj, Rangpur, East Pakistan
- Date: 27 April 1971 (UTC+6:00)
- Target: Bengali Hindus
- Attack type: Massacre
- Weapon: Rifles
- Deaths: 400
- Perpetrator: Pakistani Army

Kaliganj massacre (Bengali: কালিগঞ্জ গণহত্যা) refers to the massacre of over 400 unarmed Bengali Hindus in East Pakistan fleeing to India in Kaliganj market, in the present day Jaldhaka Upazila of Nilphamari District on 27 April 1971. An estimated 400 Bengali Hindus were killed by the occupying Pakistan Army.

== Background ==
In 1971, Kaliganj market fell under Jaldhaka police station of Nilphamari sub-division of the erstwhile greater Rangpur district. Now, known as the Bangabandhu market, it falls under the Golna Union of Jaldhaka Upazila of Nilphamari District in Rangpur Division. The Bangabandhu market is situated 9 km to the north west of Jaldhaka Upazila headquarters.

== Killings ==
In 1971, when the Pakistan army launched a genocidal campaign in Bangladesh, the Bengali Hindus of the area began to flee to India. On 27 April, more than a thousand Bengali Hindus of different unions of the present day Jaldhaka Upazila took refuge in Kaliganj market. Some of them left towards India. At around 10 am, an estimated 300 Bengali Hindu men, women and children from Balagram Union arrived in Kaliganj market.

Around the same time a contingent of the Pakistan army arrived in Kaliganj market in four convoys. Before the stranded Bengali Hindu refugees could understand anything, they were sprayed with bullets. According to survivor Amar Krishna Adhikari, a Pakistani major separated the refugees into two groups. One group was taken to the nearby canal where they were shot dead. The rest were shot on the spot. The wounded were buried alive along with those who died on the spot.

== Aftermath ==
In 1999, a memorial was built in the memory of the victims.
