= Bahagili Union =

Bahagili Union বাহাগিলী ইউনিয়ন
- Union
- Kathali Union
- Country: Bangladesh
- Division: Rangpur
- District: Nilphamari
- Upazila: Kishoreganj

Area
  - Total: 23.10 km^{2} (8.92 sq mi)

Population (2011)
  - Total: 25,351
  - Density: 1,097/km^{2} (2,842/sq mi)
- Time zone: UTC+6 (BST)
- Website: bahagiliup.nilphamari.gov.bd

Bahagili Union (Bengali: বাহাগিলী ইউনিয়ন) is a union parishad situated at Kishoreganj Upazila, in Nilphamari District, Rangpur Division of Bangladesh. The union has an area of 23.10 square kilometres (8.92 sq mi) and as of 2001 had a population of 25,351. There are 56 villages and 5 mouzas in the union.
