= Chandkhana Union =

Chandkhana Union চাঁদখানা ইউনিয়ন
- Union
- Kathali Union
- Country: Bangladesh
- Division: Rangpur
- District: Nilphamari
- Upazila: Kishoreganj

Area
  - Total: 59.25 km^{2} (22.88 sq mi)

Population (2011)
  - Total: 26,142
  - Density: 441.2/km^{2} (1,143/sq mi)
- Time zone: UTC+6 (BST)
- Website: chandkhanaup.nilphamari.gov.bd

Chandkhana Union (Bengali: চাঁদখানা ইউনিয়ন) is a union parishad situated at Kishoreganj Upazila, in Nilphamari District, Rangpur Division of Bangladesh. The union has an area of 59.25 square kilometres (22.88 sq mi) and as of 2001 had a population of 26,142. There are 10 villages and 5 mouzas in the union.
