= Kasirambelpukur Union =

Kasirambelpukur Union কাশিরামবেলপুকুর ইউনিয়ন
- Union
- Kasirambelpukur Union
- Country: Bangladesh
- Division: Rangpur
- District: Nilphamari
- Upazila: Saidpur

Area
  - Total: 54.62 km^{2} (21.09 sq mi)

Population (2011)
  - Total: 31,546
  - Density: 577.6/km^{2} (1,496/sq mi)
- Time zone: UTC+6 (BST)
- Website: kasirambelpukurup.nilphamari.gov.bd

Kasirambelpukur Union (Bengali: কাশিরামবেলপুকুর ইউনিয়ন) is a union parishad situated at Saidpur Upazila, in Nilphamari District, Rangpur Division of Bangladesh. The union has an area of 54.62 square kilometres (21.09 sq mi) and as of 2001 had a population of 31,546. There are 11 villages and 9 mouzas in the union.
