= Mirganj Union =

Mirganj Union মীরগঞ্জ ইউনিয়ন
- Union
- Mirganj Union
- Country: Bangladesh
- Division: Rangpur
- District: Nilphamari
- Upazila: Jaldhaka

Area
  - Total: 21.6 km^{2} (8.3 sq mi)

Population (2011)
  - Total: 26,357
  - Density: 1,220/km^{2} (3,160/sq mi)
- Time zone: UTC+6 (BST)
- Website: mirganj.nilphamari.gov.bd

Mirganj Union (Bengali: মীরগঞ্জ ইউনিয়ন) is a union parishad situated at Jaldhaka Upazila, in Nilphamari District, Rangpur Division of Bangladesh. The union has an area of 21.6 square kilometres (8.3 sq mi) and as of 2001 had a population of 26,357. There are 7 villages and 4 mouzas in the union.
