= Golmunda Union =

Coordinates: 26°01′12″N 89°01′22″E

Golmunda Union গোলমুন্ডা ইউনিয়ন
- Union
- Balagram Union
- Location within Bangladesh
- Country: Bangladesh
- Division: Rangpur
- District: Nilphamari
- Upazila: Jaldhaka

Area
  - Total: 15.7 km^{2} (6.1 sq mi)

Population (2011)
  - Total: 35,236
  - Density: 2,240/km^{2} (5,810/sq mi)
- Time zone: UTC+6 (BST)
- Website: golmunda.nilphamari.gov.bd

Golmunda Union (Bengali: গোলমুন্ডা ইউনিয়ন) is a union parishad situated at Jaldhaka Upazila, in Nilphamari District, Rangpur Division of Bangladesh. The union has an area of 15.7 square kilometres (6.1 sq mi) and as of 2001 had a population of 35,236. There are 10 villages and 5 mouzas in the union.
