= Nitai Union =

Nitai Union নিতাই ইউনিয়ন
- Union
- Nitai Union
- Country: Bangladesh
- Division: Rangpur
- District: Nilphamari
- Upazila: Kishoreganj

Area
  - Total: 21.4 km^{2} (8.3 sq mi)

Population (2011)
  - Total: 29,788
  - Density: 1,390/km^{2} (3,610/sq mi)
- Time zone: UTC+6 (BST)
- Website: nitaiup.nilphamari.gov.bd

Nitai Union (Bengali: নিতাই ইউনিয়ন) is a union parishad situated at Kishoreganj Upazila, in Nilphamari District, Rangpur Division of Bangladesh. The union has an area of 21.4 square kilometres (8.3 sq mi) and as of 2001 had a population of 29,788. There are 17 villages and 3 mouzas in the union.
