= Ranachandi Union =

Ranachandi Union রনচন্ডি ইউনিয়ন
- Union
- Ranachandi Union
- Country: Bangladesh
- Division: Rangpur
- District: Nilphamari
- Upazila: Kishoreganj

Area
  - Total: 23.10 km^{2} (8.92 sq mi)

Population (2011)
  - Total: 25৭৪৭
  - Density: 1.1/km^{2} (2.8/sq mi)
- Time zone: UTC+6 (BST)
- Website: ranachandiup.nilphamari.gov.bd

Ranachandi Union (Bengali: রনচন্ডি ইউনিয়ন) is a union parishad situated at Kishoreganj Upazila, in Nilphamari District, Rangpur Division of Bangladesh. The union has an area of 23.10 square kilometres (8.92 sq mi) and as of 2001 had a population of 25,747. There are 6 villages and 6 mouzas in the union.
