= Magura Union, Kishoreganj =

Magura Union মাগুরা ইউনিয়ন
- Union
- Magura Union
- Country: Bangladesh
- Division: Rangpur
- District: Nilphamari
- Upazila: Kishoreganj

Area
  - Total: 22.00 km^{2} (8.49 sq mi)

Population (2011)
  - Total: 35,161
  - Density: 1,598/km^{2} (4,139/sq mi)
- Time zone: UTC+6 (BST)
- Website: maguraup.nilphamari.gov.bd

Magura Union (Bengali: মাগুরা ইউনিয়ন) is a union parishad situated at Kishoreganj Upazila, in Nilphamari District, Rangpur Division of Bangladesh. The union has an area of 22.00 square kilometres (8.49 sq mi) and as of 2001 had a population of 35,161. There are 3 villages and 3 mouzas in the union.
