= Khutamara Union =

Khutamara Union খুটামারা ইউনিয়ন
- Union
- Khutamara Union
- Country: Bangladesh
- Division: Rangpur
- District: Nilphamari
- Upazila: Jaldhaka

Area
  - Total: 26.53 km^{2} (10.24 sq mi)

Population (2011)
  - Total: 39,580
  - Density: 1,492/km^{2} (3,864/sq mi)
- Time zone: UTC+6 (BST)
- Website: khutamaraup.nilphamari.gov.bd

Khutamara Union (Bengali: খুটামারা ইউনিয়ন) is a union parishad situated at Jaldhaka Upazila, in Nilphamari District, Rangpur Division of Bangladesh. The union has an area of 26.53 square kilometres (10.24 sq mi) and as of 2001 had a population of 39,580. There are 7 villages and 7 mouzas in the union.
