= Rana Mohammad Sohail =

Bangladeshi politician

- রানা মোহাম্মদ সোহেল

Member of Parliament for Nilphamari-3
- In office 30 January 2019 – 6 January 2024
- Preceded by: Golam Mostofa
- Succeeded by: Saddam Hussain Pavel

Personal details
- Born: 16 February 1966 (age 60) Rangpur City, East Pakistan, Pakistan
- Party: Jatiya Party
- Education: MBA
- Occupation: Business consultant

Military service
- Allegiance: Bangladesh
- Branch/service: Bangladesh Army
- Years of service: 1986 - 1996
- Rank: Captain
- Unit: East Bengal Regiment

Rana Mohammad Sohail (Bengali: রানা মোহাম্মাদ সোহেল) is a Jatiya Party politician and a former member of parliament for Nilphamari-3.

== Career ==
Rana Mohammad Sohail was commissioned as an officer of the Bangladesh Army in 1986. He graduated with an MBA (finance) from the Institute of Business Administration (IBA) of the University of Dhaka in 1995. He voluntarily retired from the army in 1996. Rana Sohail went to the United States in 1997 as a student of the McCombs School of Business at the University of Texas at Austin. He graduated with an MBA (energy finance) from McCombs School of Business in 1999. Sohail worked in several states until 2007 and then returned to Bangladesh. He worked in Dhaka till 2016. Rana Mohammad Sohail was elected to parliament from Nilphamari-3 as a Jatiya Party candidate on 30 December 2018.
