= Nilphamari Sadar Upazila =

Nilphamari Sadar নীলফামারী সদর
- Upazila
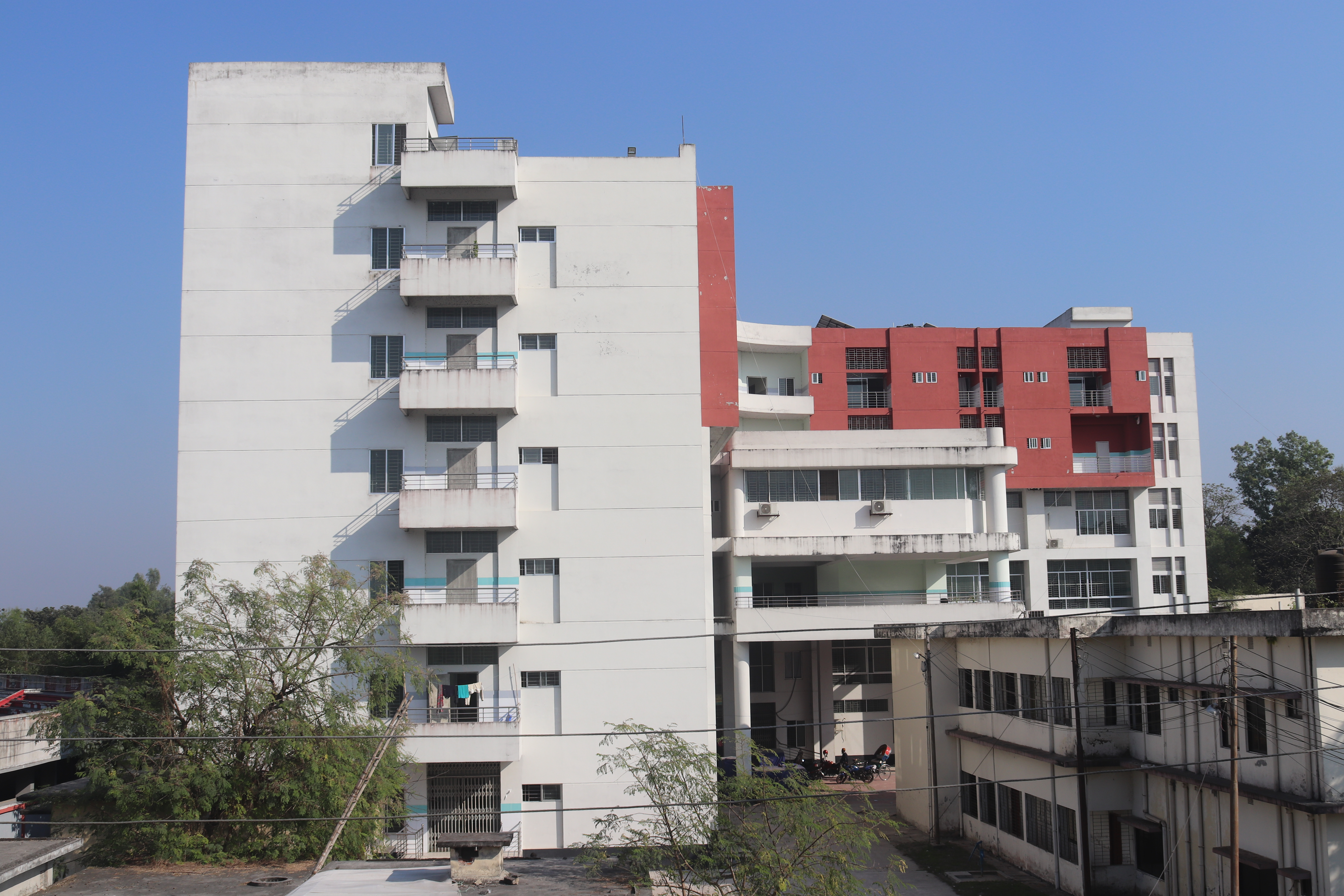
- Hospital in Nilphamari

- Coordinates: 25°56.5′N 88°50.7′E
- Country: Bangladesh
- Division: Rangpur
- District: Nilphamari
- Headquarters: Nilphamari

Government
  - Member of Parliament: Al Faruq Abdul Latif
  - Party: Bangladesh Jamaat-e-Islami

Area
  - Upazila: 373.30 km^{2} (144.13 sq mi)
  - Urban: 27.5 km^{2} (10.6 sq mi)
  - Metro: 42.7 km^{2} (16.5 sq mi)

Population (2022)
  - Upazila: 523,966
  - Density: 1,403.6/km^{2} (3,635.3/sq mi)
  - Urban: 85,700
  - Metro: 245,000
- Time zone: UTC+6 (BST)
- Postal code: 5300
- Area code: 0551
- Website: nilphamarisadar.nilphamari.gov.bd

Nilphamari Sadar (Bengali: নীলফামারী সদর) is an upazila of Nilphamari District in the Division of Rangpur, Bangladesh. Nilphamari Sadar thana was established in 1870. It was under Daroani thana before 1870. It gradually turned into an Upazilla in 1984.

== Geography ==
Nilphamari Sadar is located at 25.9417°N 88.8444°E. It has 97,088 households and total area 373.30 km^{2}. It is bounded by Debiganj and Domar upazilas on the north, Jaldhaka and Kishoreganj upazilas on the east, Saidpur Upazila to the south and Khansama Upazila to the west.

== Demographics ==
Religions in Nilphamari Sadar Upazila (2022)
Religion	Percent
Islam	80.16%
Hinduism	19.68%
Other or not stated	0.16%

According to the 2022 Bangladeshi census, Nilphamari Sadar Upazila had 124,246 households and a population of 523,966. 9.88% of the population were under 5 years of age. Nilphamari Sadar had a literacy rate (age 7 and over) of 69.79%: 72.94% for males and 66.68% for females, and a sex ratio of 99.61 males for every 100 females. 117,894 (22.50%) lived in urban areas.

According to the 2011 Census of Bangladesh, Nilphamari Sadar Upazila had 97,088 households and a population of 435,162. 107,932 (24.80%) were under 10 years of age. Nilphamari Sadar had a literacy rate (age 7 and over) of 45.73%, compared to the national average of 51.8%, and a sex ratio of 986 females per 1000 males. 45,386 (10.43%) lived in urban areas.

As of the 1991 Bangladesh census, Nilphamari Sadar has a population of 306051. Males constitute 51.23% of the population, and females 48.77%. This Upazila's eighteen up population is 150237. Nilphamari Sadar has an average literacy rate of 23.2% (7+ years), and the national average of 32.4% literate.

== Administration ==
Nilphamari Thana was formed in 1870 and it was turned into an upazila in 1984.

Nilphamari Sadar Upazila is divided into Nilphamari Municipality and 15 union parishads:

- Chaora Bargacha Union
- Chapra Saranjani Union
- Charaikhola Union
- Gorgram Union
- Itakhola Union
- Kachukata Union
- Khoksabari Union
- Kundapukur Union
- Lakshmichap Union
- Palasbari Union
- Ramnagar Union
- Songalsi Union
- Sonaray Union
- Tupamari Union

The union parishads are subdivided into 109 mauzas and 108 villages.

At present, Nilphamari Municipality has an area of 27.50 sqkm and is subdivided into 15 wards. The processing of increasing the area of Nilphamari Municipality is ongoing. The proposed area will be 42.70 sqkm.

== Education ==
According to Banglapedia, Nilphamari Government High School, founded in 1882, is a notable secondary school.

== See also ==
- Upazilas of Bangladesh
- Districts of Bangladesh
- Divisions of Bangladesh
