= Douabari Union =

Douabari Union ডাউয়াবাড়ী ইউনিয়ন
- Union
- Douabari Union
- Country: Bangladesh
- Division: Rangpur
- District: Nilphamari
- Upazila: Jaldhaka

Area
  - Total: 22.24 km^{2} (8.59 sq mi)

Population (2011)
  - Total: 14,332
  - Density: 644.4/km^{2} (1,669/sq mi)
- Time zone: UTC+6 (BST)
- Website: douabariup.nilphamari.gov.bd

Douabari Union (Bengali: ডাউয়াবাড়ী ইউনিয়ন) is a union parishad situated at Jaldhaka Upazila, in Nilphamari District, Rangpur Division of Bangladesh. The union has an area of 22.24 square kilometres (8.59 sq mi) and as of 2001 had a population of 14,332. There are 9 villages and 6 mouzas in the union.
