= Garagram Union =

Garagram Union গাড়াগ্রাম ইউনিয়ন
- Union
- Garagram Union
- Country: Bangladesh
- Division: Rangpur
- District: Nilphamari
- Upazila: Kishoreganj

Area
  - Total: 22.9 km^{2} (8.8 sq mi)

Population (2011)
  - Total: 30,469
  - Density: 1,330/km^{2} (3,450/sq mi)
- Time zone: UTC+6 (BST)
- Website: garagramup.nilphamari.gov.bd

Garagram Union (Bengali: গাড়াগ্রাম ইউনিয়ন) is a union parishad situated at Kishoreganj Upazila, in Nilphamari District, Rangpur Division of Bangladesh. The union has an area of 22.9 square kilometres (8.8 sq mi) and as of 2001 had a population of 30,469. There are 7 villages and 3 mouzas in the union.
