= Shimulbari Union =

Shimulbari Union শিমুলবাড়ী ইউনিয়ন
- Union
- Shimulbari Union
- Country: Bangladesh
- Division: Rangpur
- District: Nilphamari
- Upazila: Jaldhaka

Area
  - Total: 19.20 km^{2} (7.41 sq mi)

Population (2011)
  - Total: 35,857
  - Density: 1,868/km^{2} (4,837/sq mi)
- Time zone: UTC+6 (BST)
- Website: simulbari.nilphamari.gov.bd

Shimulbari Union (Bengali: শিমুলবাড়ী ইউনিয়ন) is a union parishad situated at Jaldhaka Upazila, in Nilphamari District, Rangpur Division of Bangladesh. The union has an area of 21.71 square kilometres (8.38 sq mi) and as of 2001 had a population of 35,857. There are 9 villages and 9 mouzas in the union.
