= Balagram Union =

Balagram Union বালাগ্রাম ইউনিয়ন
- Union
- Balagram Union
- Country: Bangladesh
- Division: Rangpur
- District: Nilphamari
- Upazila: Jaldhaka

Area
  - Total: 26.96 km^{2} (10.41 sq mi)

Population (2011)
  - Total: 28,374
  - Density: 1,052/km^{2} (2,726/sq mi)
- Time zone: UTC+6 (BST)
- Website: balagram.nilphamari.gov.bd

Balagram Union (Bengali: বালাগ্রাম ইউনিয়ন) is a union parishad situated at Jaldhaka Upazila, in Nilphamari District, Rangpur Division of Bangladesh. The union has an area of 26.96 square kilometres (10.41 sq mi) and as of 2001 had a population of 28,374. There are 9 villages and 5 mouzas in the union.
