= Panga Motukpur Union =

Panga Motukpur Union পাংগা মটকপুর ইউনিয়ন
- Union
- Panga Motukpur Union
- Country: Bangladesh
- Division: Rangpur
- District: Nilphamari
- Upazila: Domar

Area
  - Total: 19.5 km^{2} (7.5 sq mi)

Population (2011)
  - Total: 15,047
  - Density: 772/km^{2} (2,000/sq mi)
- Time zone: UTC+6 (BST)
- Website: pangamotukpurup.nilphamari.gov.bd

Panga Motukpur Union (Bengali: পাংগা মটকপুর ইউনিয়ন) is a union parishad situated at Domar Upazila, in Nilphamari District, Rangpur Division of Bangladesh. The union has an area of 19.5 square kilometres (7.5 sq mi) and as of 2001 had a population of 15,047. There are 8 villages and 3 mouzas in the union.
