= Palasbari Union =

Palasbari Union পলাশবাড়ী ইউনিয়ন
- Union
- Palasbari Union
- Country: Bangladesh
- Division: Rangpur
- District: Nilphamari
- Upazila: Nilphamari Sadar

Area
  - Total: 22.35 km^{2} (8.63 sq mi)

Population (2011)
  - Total: 23,736
  - Density: 1,062/km^{2} (2,751/sq mi)
- Time zone: UTC+6 (BST)
- Website: palasbariup.nilphamari.gov.bd

Palasbari Union (Bengali: পলাশবাড়ী ইউনিয়ন) is a union parishad situated at Nilphamari Sadar Upazila, in Nilphamari District, Rangpur Division of Bangladesh. The union has an area of 22.35 square kilometres (8.63 sq mi) and as of 2001 had a population of 23,736. There are 12 villages and 10 mouzas in the union.
