= Itakhola Union =

Itakhola Union ইটাখোলা ইউনিয়ন
- Union
- Itakhola Union
- Country: Bangladesh
- Division: Rangpur
- District: Nilphamari
- Upazila: Nilphamari Sadar

Area
  - Total: 35.70 km^{2} (13.78 sq mi)

Population (2011)
  - Total: 27,527
  - Density: 771.1/km^{2} (1,997/sq mi)
- Time zone: UTC+6 (BST)
- Website: itakholaup.nilphamari.gov.bd

Itakhola Union (Bengali: ইটাখোলা ইউনিয়ন) is a union parishad situated at Nilphamari Sadar Upazila, in Nilphamari District, Rangpur Division of Bangladesh. The union has an area of 35.70 square kilometres (13.78 sq mi) and as of 2001 had a population of 27,527. There are 18 villages and 5 mouzas in the union.
