= Chaora Bargacha Union =

Chaora Bargacha Union চওড়া বড়গাছা ইউনিয়ন
- Union
- Chaora Bargacha Union
- Country: Bangladesh
- Division: Rangpur
- District: Nilphamari
- Upazila: Nilphamari Sadar

Area
  - Total: 30.61 km^{2} (11.82 sq mi)

Population (2011)
  - Total: 35,551
  - Density: 1,161/km^{2} (3,008/sq mi)
- Time zone: UTC+6 (BST)
- Website: chaorabargachaup.nilphamari.gov.bd

Chaora Bargacha Union (Bengali: চওড়া বড়গাছা ইউনিয়ন) is a union parishad situated at Nilphamari Sadar Upazila, in Nilphamari District, Rangpur Division of Bangladesh. The union has an area of 30.61 square kilometres (11.82 sq mi) and as of 2001 had a population of 35,551. There are 6 villages and 4 mouzas in the union.
