= Chapra Saranjani Union =

Chapra Saranjani Union চাপড়া সরঞ্জানী ইউনিয়ন
- Union
- Chapra Saranjani Union
- Country: Bangladesh
- Division: Rangpur
- District: Nilphamari
- Upazila: Nilphamari Sadar

Area
  - Total: 30.61 km^{2} (11.82 sq mi)

Population (2011)
  - Total: 35,551
  - Density: 1,161/km^{2} (3,008/sq mi)
- Time zone: UTC+6 (BST)
- Website: chaprasarnjami.nilphamari.gov.bd

Chapra Saranjani Union (Bengali: চাপড়া সরঞ্জানী ইউনিয়ন) is a union parishad situated at Nilphamari Sadar Upazila, in Nilphamari District, Rangpur Division of Bangladesh. The union has an area of 30.61 square kilometres (11.82 sq mi) and as of 2001 had a population of 35,551. There are 6 villages and 4 mouzas in the union.
