= Golam Mostofa (politician) =

Bangladeshi politician

Member of Parliament

Personal details
- Party: Bangladesh Awami League

Golam Mostofa is a Bangladesh Awami League politician and former Member of Parliament from Nilphamari-3.

== Career ==
Mostofa was nominated by Bangladesh Awami League in 2008 for the Nilphamari-3. He lost the election to Jatiya Party candidate Kazi Faruque Kader, the son of Kazi Abdul Kader, former Minister of Pakistan. He was elected to Parliament from Nilphamari-3 as a candidate of Bangladesh Awami League on 5 January 2014.
