= Siddiqul Alam Siddiq =

Member of Jatiya Sangsad

- সিদ্দিকুল আলম সিদ্দিক

Member of the Bangladesh Parliament for Nilphamari-4
- In office 30 January 2024 – 6 August 2024
- Preceded by: Ahsan Adelur Rahman
- Succeeded by: Abdul Muntakim

Personal details
- Born: 28 December 1970 (age 55)
- Party: Jatiya Party (Ershad)

Siddqul Alam Siddiq (born 28 December 1970) is a Bangladeshi businessman, and a former member of the Jatiya Sangsad. He is the managing director of Eque Group, a large industrial enterprise in northern Bangladesh.
