= Nazma Akther =

Bangladeshi politician

- নাজমা আখতার

Member of the Bangladesh Parliament for Reserved Women's Seat-46
- In office 20 February 2019 – 29 January 2024
- Preceded by: Merina Rahman
- Succeeded by: Tarana Halim

Personal details
- Born: 1 October 1967 (age 58)
- Party: Jatiya Party (Ershad)
- Education: M.S.S

Nazma Akther (born 1 October 1967) is a Jatiya Party (Ershad) politician and a member of the Bangladesh Parliament from a reserved seat.

== Career ==
Akther was elected to parliament from reserved seat as a Jatiya Party (Ershad) candidate in 2019. She is member of Standing Committee on Ministry of Foreign Affairs.
