= Sonaray Union, Domar =

Sonaray Union সোনারায় ইউনিয়ন
- Union
- Sonaray Union
- Country: Bangladesh
- Division: Rangpur
- District: Nilphamari
- Upazila: Domar

Area
  - Total: 28.75 km^{2} (11.10 sq mi)

Population (2011)
  - Total: 34,399
  - Density: 1,196/km^{2} (3,099/sq mi)
- Time zone: UTC+6 (BST)
- Website: sonarayup2.nilphamari.gov.bd

Sonaray Union (Bengali: সোনারায় ইউনিয়ন) is a union parishad situated at Domar Upazila, in Nilphamari District, Rangpur Division of Bangladesh. The union has an area of 28.75 square kilometres (11.10 sq mi) and as of 2001 had a population of 34,399. There are 7 villages and 7 mouzas in the union.
