= MK Alam Chowdhury =

Bangladeshi politician

Member of Bangladesh Parliament
- In office 1988–1991
- Preceded by: Joban Uddin Ahmad
- Succeeded by: Md. Azaharul Islam

Personal details
- Party: Jatiya Party (Ershad)

MK Alam Chowdhury is a Jatiya Party (Ershad) politician in Bangladesh and a former member of parliament for Nilphamari-3.

== Career ==
Chowdhury was elected to parliament from Nilphamari-3 as a Jatiya Party candidate in 1988.
