= Tupamari Union =

Tupamari Union টুপামারী ইউনিয়ন
- Union
- Charaikhola Union
- Country: Bangladesh
- Division: Rangpur
- District: Nilphamari
- Upazila: Nilphamari Sadar

Area
  - Total: 24.18 km^{2} (9.34 sq mi)

Population (2011)
  - Total: 35,527
  - Density: 1,469/km^{2} (3,805/sq mi)
- Time zone: UTC+6 (BST)
- Website: tupamariup.nilphamari.gov.bd

Tupamari Union (Bengali: টুপামারী ইউনিয়ন) is a union parishad situated at Nilphamari Sadar Upazila, in Nilphamari District, Rangpur Division of Bangladesh. The union has an area of 24.18 square kilometres (9.34 sq mi) and as of 2001 had a population of 35,527. There are 9 villages and 9 mouzas in the union.
