= Bhogdaburi Union =

Bhogdaburi Union ভোগডাবুড়ী ইউনিয়ন
- Union
- Bhogdaburi Union
- Country: Bangladesh
- Division: Rangpur
- District: Nilphamari
- Upazila: Domar

Area
  - Total: 14 km^{2} (5.4 sq mi)

Population (2011)
  - Total: 36,850
  - Density: 2,600/km^{2} (6,800/sq mi)
- Time zone: UTC+6 (BST)
- Website: bhogdaburiup.nilphamari.gov.bd

Bhogdaburi Union (Bengali: ভোগডাবুড়ী ইউনিয়ন) is a union parishad situated at Domar Upazila, in Nilphamari District, Rangpur Division of Bangladesh. The union has an area of 14 square kilometres (5.4 sq mi) and as of 2001 had a population of 36,850. There are 5 villages and 5 mouzas in the union.
