= Saddam Hussain Pavel =

Bangladeshi politician

Saddam Hossain Pavel

Member of the Bangladesh Parliament for Nilphamari-3
- In office 30 January 2024 – 6 August 2024
- Preceded by: Rana Mohammad Sohail
- Succeeded by: Obaidullah Salafi

Personal details
- Born: 7 November 1975 (age 50)
- Party: Independent

Saddam Hossain Pavel (born 7 November 1975) is a Bangladeshi independent politician and a former Jatiya Sangsad member representing the Nilphamari-3 constituency in 2024.

== Career ==
Pavel was elected to parliament from Nilphamari-3 as an independent candidate on 7 January 2024. He is also the current central secretary of Relief and Social Welfare of the Jubo League.

Following a period of intense student protests, the government led by Prime Minister Sheikh Hasina resigned. As a consequence of the political turmoil and demands for change, on 6 August 2024, the President of Bangladesh dissolved the parliament.
