= Ketkibari Union =

Ketkibari Union কেতকীবাড়ী ইউনিয়ন
- Union
- Ketkibari Union
- Country: Bangladesh
- Division: Rangpur
- District: Nilphamari
- Upazila: Domar

Area
  - Total: 18.51 km^{2} (7.15 sq mi)

Population (2011)
  - Total: 24,800
  - Density: 1,340/km^{2} (3,470/sq mi)
- Time zone: UTC+6 (BST)
- Website: ketkibariup.nilphamari.gov.bd

Ketkibari Union (Bengali: কেতকীবাড়ী ইউনিয়ন) is a union parishad situated at Domar Upazila, in Nilphamari District, Rangpur Division of Bangladesh. The union has an area of 18.51 square kilometres (7.15 sq mi) and as of 2001 had a population of 24,800. There are 3 villages and 3 mouzas in the union.
