= Ramnagar Union, Nilphamari Sadar =

Ramnagar Union রামনগর ইউনিয়ন
- Union
- Ramnagar Union
- Country: Bangladesh
- Division: Rangpur
- District: Nilphamari
- Upazila: Nilphamari Sadar

Area
  - Total: 25.97 km^{2} (10.03 sq mi)

Population (2011)
  - Total: 32,021
  - Density: 1,233/km^{2} (3,193/sq mi)
- Time zone: UTC+6 (BST)
- Website: ramnagarup.nilphamari.gov.bd

Ramnagar Union (Bengali: রামনগর ইউনিয়ন) is a union parishad situated at Nilphamari Sadar Upazila, in Nilphamari District, Rangpur Division of Bangladesh. The union has an area of 58.97 square kilometres (22.77 sq mi) and as of 2001 had a population of 32,021. There are 18 villages and 4 mouzas in the union.
