= Shaulmari Union =

Shaulmari Union শৌলমারী ইউনিয়ন
- Union
- Kathali Union
- Country: Bangladesh
- Division: Rangpur
- District: Nilphamari
- Upazila: Jaldhaka

Area
  - Total: 24.5 km^{2} (9.5 sq mi)

Population (2011)
  - Total: 25,134
  - Density: 1,030/km^{2} (2,660/sq mi)
- Time zone: UTC+6 (BST)
- Website: shaulmariup.nilphamari.gov.bd

Shaulmari Union (Bengali: শৌলমারী ইউনিয়ন) is a union parishad situated at Jaldhaka Upazila, in Nilphamari District, Rangpur Division of Bangladesh. The union has an area of 24.5 square kilometres (9.5 sq mi) and as of 2001 had a population of 25,134. There are 34 villages and 3 mouzas in the union.
