= Joban Uddin Ahmad =

Bangladesh politician

Member of Bangladesh Parliament
- In office 1986–1988
- Succeeded by: MK Alam Chowdhury

Personal details
- Party: Bangladesh Jamaat-e-Islami

Joban Uddin Ahmad is a Bangladesh Jamaat-e-Islami politician and a former member of parliament for Nilphamari-3.

== Career ==
Ahmed was elected to parliament from Nilphamari-3 as a Bangladesh Jamaat-e-Islami candidate in 1986.
