= A. A. Maruf Saklain =

Bangladeshi politician (1944–2017)

Member of Bangladesh Parliament
- In office 29 December 2008 – 5 January 2014
- Preceded by: Amzad Hossain Sarker
- Succeeded by: Shawkat Chowdhury

Personal details
- Born: 3 May 1944
- Died: 21 April 2017 (aged 72)
- Party: Bangladesh Awami League

A. A. Maruf Saklain (1944–2017) was a Bangladesh Awami League politician, Bangladesh Army officer, and a member of parliament for Nilphamari-4.

== Career ==
Saklain retired from Bangladesh Army as a colonel and was a member of the Retired Armed Forces Officer's Welfare Association. He was elected to parliament from Nilphamari-4 as a Bangladesh Awami League candidate in 2008.

== Death ==
Saklain died on 21 April 2017.
