= Jonab Ali Ukil =

Bangladeshi politician

Member of Bangladesh Parliament
- In office 1973–1979
- Succeeded by: Kazi Abdul Kuader

Personal details
- Party: Bangladesh Awami League

Jonab Ali Ukil is a Bangladesh Awami League politician and a former member of parliament for Rangpur-3.

== Career ==
Ukil was elected to parliament from Rangpur-3 as a Bangladesh Awami League candidate in 1973.
