= Boragari Union =

Boragari Union বোড়াগাড়ী ইউনিয়ন
- Union
- Boragari Union
- Country: Bangladesh
- Division: Rangpur
- District: Nilphamari
- Upazila: Domar

Area
  - Total: 32.50 km^{2} (12.55 sq mi)

Population (2011)
  - Total: 32,294
  - Density: 993.7/km^{2} (2,574/sq mi)
- Time zone: UTC+6 (BST)
- Website: boragariup.nilphamari.gov.bd

Boragari Union (Bengali: বোড়াগাড়ী ইউনিয়ন) is a union parishad situated at Domar Upazila, in Nilphamari District, Rangpur Division of Bangladesh. The union has an area of 32.50 square kilometres (12.55 sq mi) and as of 2001 had a population of 32,294. There are 10 villages and 5 mouzas in the union.
