= Lakshmichap Union =

Lakshmichap Union লক্ষ্মীচাপ ইউনিয়ন
- Union
- Lakshmichap Union
- Country: Bangladesh
- Division: Rangpur
- District: Nilphamari
- Upazila: Nilphamari Sadar

Area
  - Total: 58.07 km^{2} (22.42 sq mi)

Population (2011)
  - Total: 26,229
  - Density: 451.7/km^{2} (1,170/sq mi)
- Time zone: UTC+6 (BST)
- Website: lakshmichapup.nilphamari.gov.bd

Lakshmichap Union (Bengali: লক্ষ্মীচাপ ইউনিয়ন) is a union parishad situated at Nilphamari Sadar Upazila, in Nilphamari District, Rangpur Division of Bangladesh. The union has an area of 58.07 square kilometres (22.42 sq mi) and as of 2001 had a population of 26,229. There are 8 villages and 8 mouzas in the union.
