= Charaikhola Union =

Charaikhola Union চড়াইখোলা ইউনিয়ন
- Union
- Charaikhola Union
- Country: Bangladesh
- Division: Rangpur
- District: Nilphamari
- Upazila: Nilphamari Sadar

Area
  - Total: 58.97 km^{2} (22.77 sq mi)

Population (2011)
  - Total: 16,704
  - Density: 283.3/km^{2} (733.6/sq mi)
- Time zone: UTC+6 (BST)
- Website: charaikhola.nilphamari.gov.bd

Charaikhola Union (Bengali: চড়াইখোলা ইউনিয়ন) is a union parishad situated at Nilphamari Sadar Upazila, in Nilphamari District, Rangpur Division of Bangladesh. The union has an area of 58.97 square kilometres (22.77 sq mi) and as of 2001 had a population of 16,704. There are 7 villages and 7 mouzas in the union.
