= Songalsi Union =

Songalsi Union সংগলশী ইউনিয়ন
- Union
- Songalsi Union
- Country: Bangladesh
- Division: Rangpur
- District: Nilphamari
- Upazila: Nilphamari Sadar

Area
  - Total: 22.44 km^{2} (8.66 sq mi)

Population (2011)
  - Total: 24,935
  - Density: 1,111/km^{2} (2,878/sq mi)
- Time zone: UTC+6 (BST)
- Website: songalsiup.nilphamari.gov.bd

Songalsi Union (Bengali: সংগলশী ইউনিয়ন) is a union parishad situated at Nilphamari Sadar Upazila, in Nilphamari District, Rangpur Division of Bangladesh. The union has an area of 22.44 square kilometres (8.66 sq mi) and as of 2001 had a population of 24,935. There are 9 villages and 9 mouzas in the union.
