= Domar Union =

Domar Union ডোমার ইউনিয়ন
- Union
- Domar Union
- Country: Bangladesh
- Division: Rangpur
- District: Nilphamari
- Upazila: Domar

Area
  - Total: 16.18 km^{2} (6.25 sq mi)

Population (2011)
  - Total: 29,294
  - Density: 1,811/km^{2} (4,689/sq mi)
- Time zone: UTC+6 (BST)
- Website: domarup.nilphamari.gov.bd

Domar Union (Bengali: ডোমার ইউনিয়ন) is a union parishad situated at Domar Upazila, in Nilphamari District, Rangpur Division of Bangladesh. The union has an area of 16.18 square kilometres (6.25 sq mi) and as of 2001 had a population of 29,294. There are 4 villages and 4 mouzas in the union.
