= Obaidullah Salafi =

Bangladeshi politician

Member of Parliament
- Incumbent
- Assumed office 17 February 2026
- Preceded by: Saddam Hussain Pavel
- Constituency: Nilphamari-3

Personal details
- Born: April 1, 1972 (age 54) Nilphamari, Bangladesh
- Party: Bangladesh Jamaat-e-Islami
- Occupation: Politician

Obaidullah Salafi is a Bangladeshi politician affiliated with Bangladesh Jamaat-e-Islami. He is an elected Member of Parliament from the Nilphamari-3 constituency.
