= Khoksabari Union =

Khoksabari Union খোকশাবাড়ী ইউনিয়ন
- Union
- Khoksabari Union
- Country: Bangladesh
- Division: Rangpur
- District: Nilphamari
- Upazila: Nilphamari Sadar

Area
  - Total: 25.90 km^{2} (10.00 sq mi)

Population (2011)
  - Total: 26,149
  - Density: 1,010/km^{2} (2,615/sq mi)
- Time zone: UTC+6 (BST)
- Website: khokshabariup.nilphamari.gov.bd

Khoksabari Union (Bengali: খোকশাবাড়ী ইউনিয়ন) is a union parishad situated at Nilphamari Sadar Upazila, in Nilphamari District, Rangpur Division of Bangladesh. The union has an area of 25.90 square kilometres (10.00 sq mi) and as of 2001 had a population of 26,149. There are 12 villages and 10 mouzas in the union.
