= Kachukata Union =

Kachukata Union কচুকাটা ইউনিয়ন
- Union
- Kachukata Union
- Country: Bangladesh
- Division: Rangpur
- District: Nilphamari
- Upazila: Nilphamari Sadar

Area
  - Total: 8.38 km^{2} (3.24 sq mi)

Population (2011)
  - Total: 26,506
  - Density: 3,160/km^{2} (8,190/sq mi)
- Time zone: UTC+6 (BST)
- Website: kachukataup.nilphamari.gov.bd

Kachukata Union (Bengali: কচুকাটা ইউনিয়ন) is a union parishad situated at Nilphamari Sadar Upazila, in Nilphamari District, Rangpur Division of Bangladesh. The union has an area of 8.38 square kilometres (3.24 sq mi) and as of 2001 had a population of 26,506. There are 9 villages and 4 mouzas in the union.
