= Jorabari Union =

Jorabari Union জোড়াবাড়ী ইউনিয়ন
- Union
- Domar Union
- Country: Bangladesh
- Division: Rangpur
- District: Nilphamari
- Upazila: Domar

Area
  - Total: 34.96 km^{2} (13.50 sq mi)

Population (2011)
  - Total: 31,072
  - Density: 888.8/km^{2} (2,302/sq mi)
- Time zone: UTC+6 (BST)
- Website: jorabariup.nilphamari.gov.bd

Jorabari Union (Bengali: জোড়াবাড়ী ইউনিয়ন) is a union parishad situated at Domar Upazila, in Nilphamari District, Rangpur Division of Bangladesh. The union has an area of 34.96 square kilometres (13.50 sq mi) and as of 2001 had a population of 31,072. There are 9 villages and 4 mouzas in the union.
