= Abdul Muntakim =

Bangladeshi politician

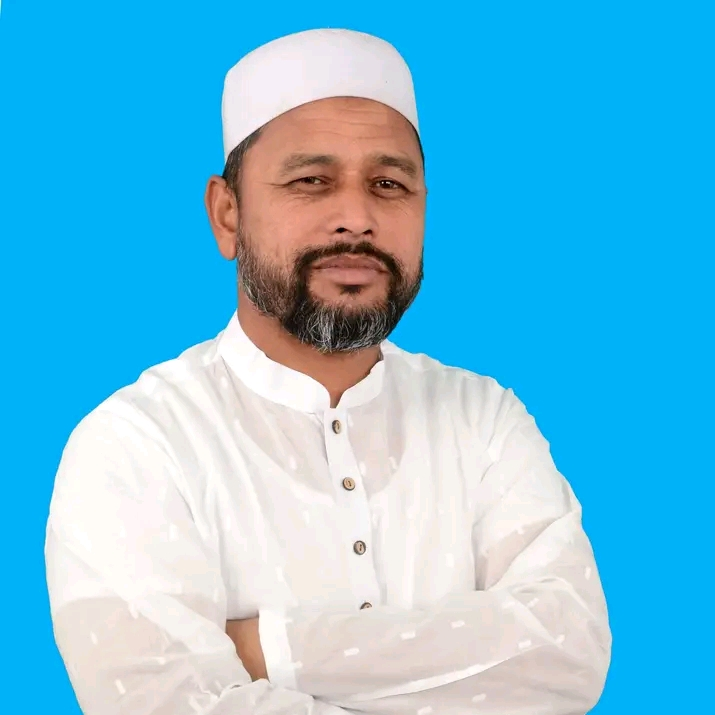

Members of Parliament
- Incumbent
- Assumed office 17 February 2026
- Preceded by: Siddiqul Alam Siddiq
- Constituency: Nilphamari-4

Member of Parliament

Personal details
- Party: Bangladesh Jamaat-e-Islami
- Occupation: Politician

Abdul Muntakim is a Bangladeshi politician affiliated with Bangladesh Jamaat-e-Islami. He is an elected Member of Parliament from the Nilphamari-4.
