= Shawkat Chowdhury =

Bangladeshi politician

- শওকত চৌধুরী

Member of Parliament for Nilphamari-4
- In office 29 January 2014 – 28 January 2019
- Preceded by: A. A. Maruf Saklain
- Succeeded by: Ahsan Adelur Rahman

Personal details
- Born: 1 August 1963 (age 62)
- Party: Jatiya Party

Shawkat Chowdhury (born 1 August 1963) is a Bangladeshi politician and a former Jatiya Sangsad member representing the Nilphamari-4 constituency during 2014–2019.

== Career ==
Chowdhury was elected to parliament from Nilphamari-4 in 2014 as a candidate of the Jatiya Party in an uncontested election. In 2017, he was imprisoned for defaulting on 1.34 billion taka loan from Bangladesh Commerce Bank.
