= Bangalipur Union =

Bangalipur Union বাঙ্গালীপুর ইউনিয়ন
- Union Council
- No. 3 Bangalipur Union Council
- Country: Bangladesh
- Division: Rangpur Division
- District: Nilphamari District
- Upazila: Saidpur Upazila
- Union Council: 1925

Government
  - Union Parishad Chairman: Pranobesh Chandra Bagchi

Population
  - Total: 21,379
- Demonym: Bangalipuri
- Time zone: UTC+6 (BST)
- Website: bangalipur.nilphamari.gov.bd

Bangalipur Union (Bengali: বাঙ্গালীপুর ইউনিয়ন) is a Union Council under Saidpur Upazila of Nilphamari District, in the division of Rangpur in Bangladesh. It has a total area of 41.44 square kilometres and a population of 21,379.

== Geography ==
Two rivers flow through Bangalipur Union; the Ponchanala River and the Karatoa River. Bangalipur Union is 4 km (2.5 mi) from Saidpur city. It is bounded by Saidpur Cantonment and Kamar Puku Union to the north, Belaichandi Union and Gopinathpur Union to the south, Saidpur Airport to the west and Alampur Union to its east.

== Education ==
The Union has 2 high schools, 8 primary schools and one dakhil madrasa (Balapara Shiberhat Islami Dakhil Madrasa).

== Administration ==
The union is divided into 5 mouzas, with a total of 5 villages (Bangalipur, Baraishalpara, Lakshanpur West Para, Lakshanpur Charakpara and Lakshanpur Balapara/Bamonpara).

=== Chairmen ===
List of chairmen
Name	Term	Notes
Muhammad Zaynullah	1925 - 1944	Bangalipur Panchayet
Muhammad Barkatullah	1944 - 1964	President of Bangalipur
Muhammad Mujibur Rahman	1964 - 1971	
Muhammad Tamizuddin Shonahar	1972 - 1975	
Abdul Latif Sarkar	1976 - 1985	
Abdur Rahman Mandal	1986 - 1991	
Abdul Latif Sarkar	1992 - 1996	2nd term
Zahir Uddin Khan	1997 - 1999	
Muhammad Musa Uddin	1999 – 2000	Acting chairman
Babu Harendra Nath Rai	2001 - 2002	
Muhammad Musa Uddin	2003 - 2011	
Babu Harendra Nath Rai	2001 - 2002	
Pranobesh Chandra Bagchi	Present	
