= Harinchara Union =

Harinchara Union হরিণচড়া ইউনিয়ন
- Union
- Domar Union
- Country: Bangladesh
- Division: Rangpur
- District: Nilphamari
- Upazila: Domar

Area
  - Total: 51.80 km^{2} (20.00 sq mi)

Population (2011)
  - Total: 21,332
  - Density: 411.8/km^{2} (1,067/sq mi)
- Time zone: UTC+6 (BST)
- Website: harincharaup.nilphamari.gov.bd

Harinchara Union (Bengali: হরিণচড়া ইউনিয়ন) is a union parishad situated at Domar Upazila, in Nilphamari District, Rangpur Division of Bangladesh. The union has an area of 51.80 square kilometres (20.00 sq mi) and as of 2001 had a population of 21,332. There are 7 villages and 9 mouzas in the union.
