= Gorgram Union =

Gorgram Union গোড়গ্রাম ইউনিয়ন
- Union
- Gorgram Union
- Country: Bangladesh
- Division: Rangpur
- District: Nilphamari
- Upazila: Nilphamari Sadar

Area
  - Total: 15.00 km^{2} (5.79 sq mi)

Population (2011)
  - Total: 33,190
  - Density: 2,213/km^{2} (5,731/sq mi)
- Time zone: UTC+6 (BST)
- Website: gorgramup.nilphamari.gov.bd

Gorgram Union (Bengali: গোড়গ্রাম ইউনিয়ন) is a union parishad situated at Nilphamari Sadar Upazila, in Nilphamari District, Rangpur Division of Bangladesh. The union has an area of 15.00 square kilometres (5.79 sq mi) and as of 2001 had a population of 33,190. There are 37 villages and 4 mouzas in the union.
