= Sonaray Union, Nilphamari Sadar =

Charaikhola Union সোনারায় ইউনিয়ন
- Union
- Sonaray Union
- Country: Bangladesh
- Division: Rangpur
- District: Nilphamari
- Upazila: Nilphamari Sadar

Area
  - Total: 24.50 km^{2} (9.46 sq mi)

Population (2011)
  - Total: 35,187
  - Density: 1,436/km^{2} (3,720/sq mi)
- Time zone: UTC+6 (BST)
- Website: sonaray.nilphamari.gov.bd

Sonaray Union (Bengali: সোনারায় ইউনিয়ন) is a union parishad situated at Nilphamari Sadar Upazila, in Nilphamari District, Rangpur Division of Bangladesh. The union has an area of 24.50 square kilometres (9.46 sq mi) and as of 2001 had a population of 35,187. There are 11 villages and 11 mouzas in the union.
