= Domar Upazila =

Domar ডোমার
- Upazila
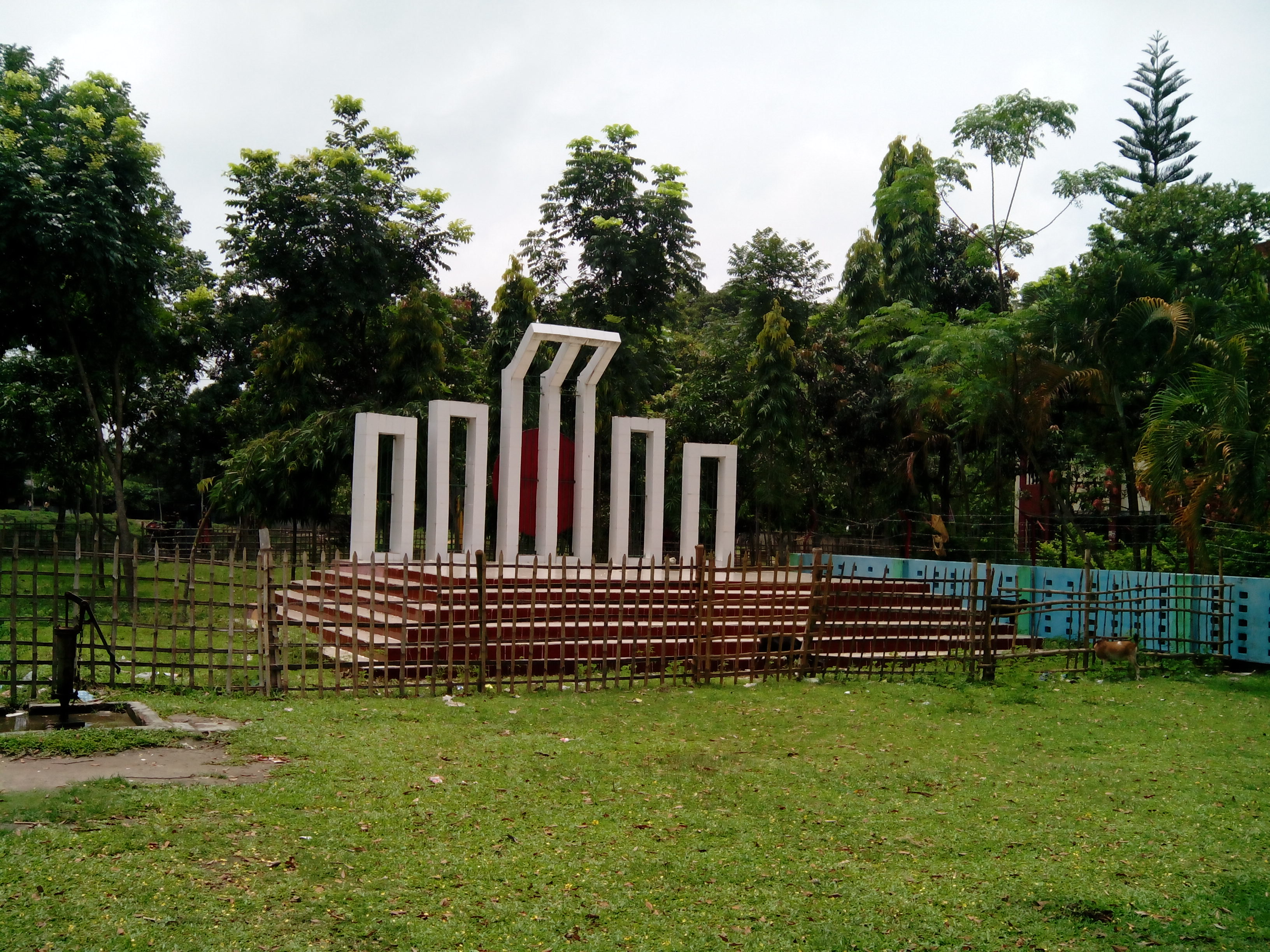
- Shaheed Minar in Domar Government College

- Coordinates: 26°6′N 88°50.2′E
- Country: Bangladesh
- Division: Rangpur
- District: Nilphamari

Area
  - Total: 216.36 km^{2} (83.54 sq mi)

Population (2022)
  - Total: 282,630
  - Density: 1,306.3/km^{2} (3,383.3/sq mi)
- Time zone: UTC+6 (BST)
- Postal code: 5340
- Area code: 0551
- Website: Official Map of Domar

Domar Upazila mauza geocode map

Domar (Bengali: ডোমার) is an upazila of Nilphamari District in the Division of Rangpur, Bangladesh.

== Geography ==
Domar is located at 26.1000°N 88.8361°E. It has 58,020 households and total area 216.36 km^{2}. Three rivers, namely Buri Tista, Shalki and Deonai are flowing through the upazila.

== Demographics ==
Religions in Domar Upazila (2022)
Religion	Percent
Islam	81.64%
Hinduism	18.35%
Other or not stated	0.01%

According to the 2022 Bangladeshi census, Domar Upazila had 69,103 households and a population of 282,630. 9.83% of the population were under 5 years of age. Domar had a literacy rate (age 7 and over) of 73.47%: 76.27% for males and 70.75% for females, and a sex ratio of 98.49 males for every 100 females. 66,282 (23.45%) lived in urban areas.

According to the 2011 Census of Bangladesh, Domar Upazila had 58,020 households and a population of 249,429. 64,048 (25.68%) were under 10 years of age. Domar had a literacy rate (age 7 and over) of 48.28%, compared to the national average of 51.8%, and a sex ratio of 990 females per 1000 males. 40,173 (16.11%) lived in urban areas.

As of the 1991 Bangladesh census, Domar has a population of 175507. Males constitute 51.16% of the population, and females 48.84%. This Upazila's eighteen up population is 87290. Domar has an average literacy rate of 39% (7+ years), and the national average of 32.4% literate.

== Administration ==
Domar thana was formed in 1875 and it was turned into an upazila in 1984. It was under Dimla thana before 1875.

Domar Upazila is divided into Domar Municipality and ten union parishads: Bhogdaburi, Ketkibari, Gomnati, Jorabari, Bamunia, Panga Motukpur, Boragari, Domar Sadar, Sonaray and Harinchara Union. The union parishads are subdivided into 47 mauzas and 47 villages.

Domar Municipality is subdivided into 9 wards and 12 mahallas.

== Notable people ==
- Shahrin Islam Tuhin, BNP politician.
- Abdur Rouf, former member of parliament.
- Mustafa Kamal, former Chief Justice of Bangladesh and Chairman of Law Commission.
- Hamida Banu Shova, former member of parliament for Nilphamari-1.

== See also ==
- Gomnati Union
- Upazilas of Bangladesh
- Districts of Bangladesh
- Divisions of Bangladesh
