= Mizanur Rahman Chowdhury (Jamaat-e-Islami politician) =

Bangladeshi politician

Member of Parliament

Personal details
- Political party: Bangladesh Jamaat-e-Islami

Mizanur Rahman Chowdhury (died 6 April 2013) was a politician of the Bangladesh Jamaat-e-Islami and the former Member of Parliament from Nilphamari-3.

== Career ==
Chowdhury was elected to Parliament in 1996 from Nilphamari-3 as a candidate of the Bangladesh Jamaat-e-Islami. He was reelected in 2001 from Nilphamari-3. His constituency, Jaldhaka Upazila, is a stronghold of Jamaat-e-Islami. In 2008, he was expelled from Jamaat-e-Islami, on charges of stealing of government corrugated iron sheets in court.

== Controversy ==
Chowdhury forced Jaldhaka College Principal Md Rahmat Ullah to resign an appointed Mozaharul Islam, a member of Bangladesh Jamaat-e-Islami. The decision was protested by the student body of the college. Md. Rahmat Ullah was reinstated as principal by the Nilphamari Additional District and Sessions Judge's Court on 26 May 2009. During his term as Member of Parliament Chowdhury had replaced more than hundred teachers and administrators in educational institutions in his constituency with politicians of the Bangladesh Jamaat-e-Islami.
