= Amzad Hossain Sarker =

Bangladeshi politician (1958–2021)

Member of the Bangladesh Parliament for Nilphamari-4
- In office 1 October 2001 – 29 October 2008
- Preceded by: Asadur Rahman
- Succeeded by: A.A. Maruf Saklain

Personal details
- Born: 1958 Saidpur, Nilphamari, East Pakistan, Pakistan
- Died: 14 January 2021 (aged 62–63) Dhaka
- Party: Bangladesh Nationalist Party
- Education: University of Rajshahi

Amzad Hossain Sarker (1958–2021) was a Bangladesh Nationalist Party politician and member of parliament for Nilphamari-4 from 2001 to 2008. He was mayor of Saidpur Paurashava.

== Career ==
Sarker was elected to parliament from Nilphamari-4 as a Bangladesh Nationalist Party candidate in 2001.

== Death ==
Sarker died on 14 January 2021 from COVID-19 during the COVID-19 pandemic in Bangladesh.
