= Asadur Rahman =

Bangladeshi politician

Member of Bangladesh Parliament
- In office 1996–2001
- Preceded by: Md. Abdul Hafiz
- Succeeded by: Amzad Hossain Sarker

Personal details
- Died: 2006
- Party: Jatiya Party (Ershad)

Asadur Rahman is a Jatiya Party (Ershad) politician and a former member of parliament for Nilphamari-4.

== Career ==
Rahman was elected to parliament from Nilphamari-4 as a Jatiya Party candidate in 1996.
