= Kazi Faruque Kader =

Bangladeshi politician

Member of Parliament Nilphamari-3
- In office 6 January 2009 – 5 January 2014
- Preceded by: Mizanur Rahman Chowdhury
- Succeeded by: Golam Mustafa

Personal details
- Party: Jatiya Party
- Spouse: Nasreen Kader
- Parent: Kazi Abdul Kader (father)

Kazi Faruq Kader is a Bangladeshi Freedom Fighter and Jatiya Party Politician and the former Member of Parliament from Nilphamari-3, Rangpur.

== Career ==
Faruq joined Jatiyo Party under General Ershad and won the 1988 National Parliament Election. Faruq was nominated for a second time from Nilphamari-3 constituency in 2008 as a candidate of Jatiya Party of the Grand Alliance. He was elected to parliament in 2008 winning by almost double the votes of his rivals. He lost the 2014 election to Golam Mostofa, Bangladesh Awami League candidate due to a rigged election.

During his time as a Member of Parliament, Faruq played a major role in establishing roads, schools, colleges and madrassas in his constituency. He also focused significantly on rural electrification.

== Personal life ==
Faruq completed his secondary education from Abbottabad Public School in Pakistan. He later graduated from Dhaka University with a Bachelors in Political Science. Faruq is a Freedom Fighter in the Bangladesh Liberation War of 1971. After his training in India, he was assigned to Sector 8 under Major Muhammed Abul Manzur (later Major General), and entered the country secretly through Jhenaidah to fight in the Liberation War.

Faruq's father, Kazi Abdul Kader, was a Government Minister of Pakistan. He was the Food & Agriculture Minister of the erstwhile East Pakistan Government and a Leader of the Convention Muslim League. Faruq is married to his wife, Nasreen, since 1972 and have 4 children together.
