= Saidpur Upazila =

Saidpur সৈয়দপুর
- Upazila
- Sayedpur
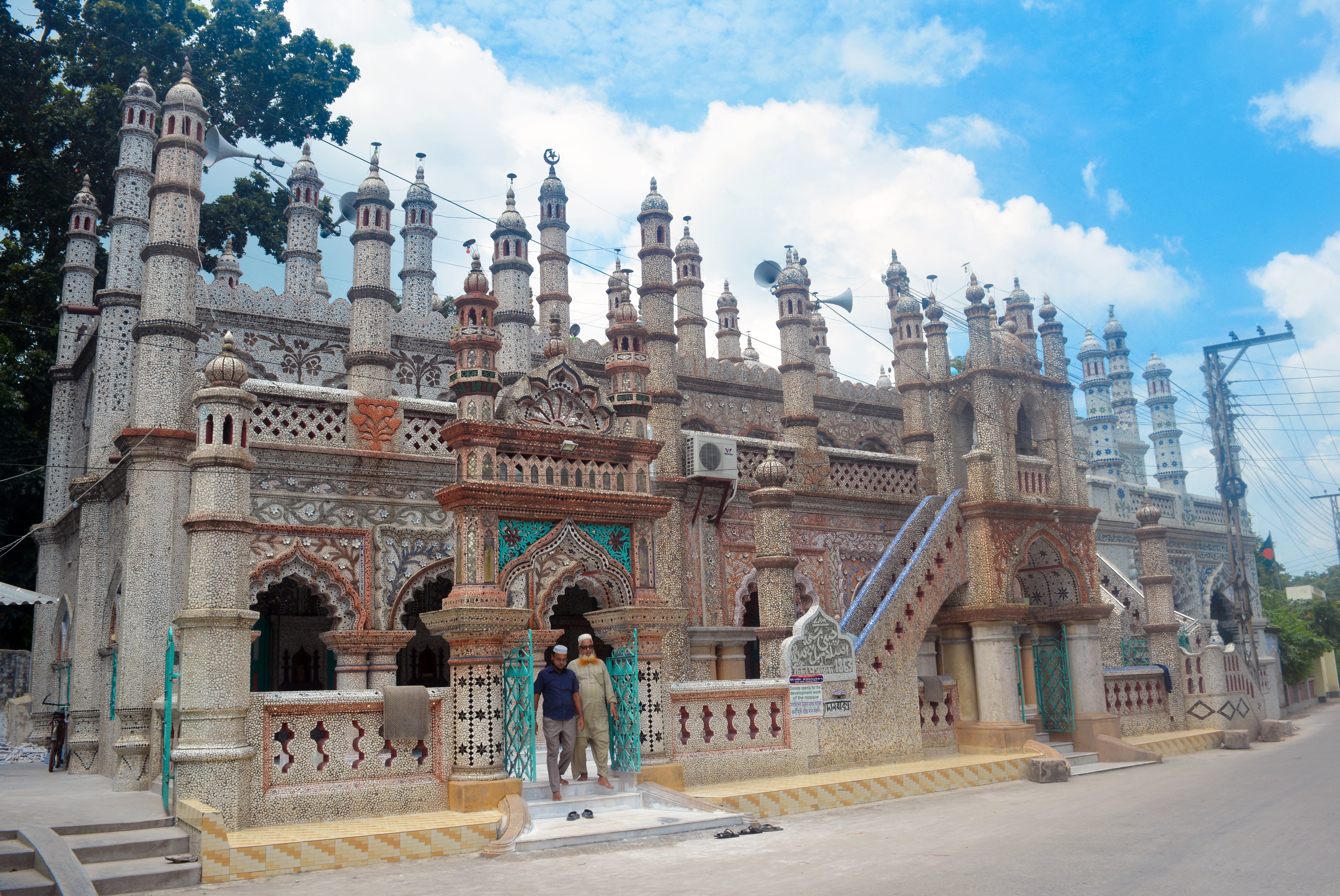
- Chini Mosque, Saidpur

- Coordinates: 25°46.7′N 88°53.5′E
- Country: Bangladesh
- Division: Rangpur
- District: Nilphamari
- Headquarters: Saidpur

Area
  - Upazila: 121.66 km^{2} (46.97 sq mi)
  - Urban: 34.82 km^{2} (13.44 sq mi)
- Elevation: 36 m (118 ft)

Population (2022)
  - Upazila: 312,993
  - Density: 2,572.7/km^{2} (6,663.2/sq mi)
- Time zone: UTC+6 (BST)
- Postal code: 5310
- Area code: 05526
- Website: Syedpur Upazila

Saidpur Upazila mauza geocode map

Saidpur (Bengali: সৈয়দপুর) is an upazila of Nilphamari District in Rangpur Division, Bangladesh. Saidpur thana, later turned into an upazila, was established in 1915. Before 1870, Saidpur was a Bazar under Daroani thana of Rangpur district. It was under Nilphamari Sadar thana of Nilphamari Mohokuma between 1870 and 1915.

== Geography ==
Saidpur is located at 25.7778°N 88.8917°E. The upazila is bounded by Nilphamari Sadar and Kishoreganj upazilas on the north-east, Badarganj and Parbatipur upazilas on the south, Taraganj upazila on the east, Chirirbandar and Khansama upazilas on the west.Saidpur Upazila Surrounding With All 3 Districts (Nilphamari, Dinajpur & Rangpur). Total area of Saidpur is 121.66 km^{2}.

== Demographics ==
Religions in Saidpur Upazila (2022)
Religion	Percent
Islam	92.45%
Hinduism	7.46%
Other or not stated	0.09%

According to the 2022 Bangladeshi census, Saidpur Upazila had 73,574 households and a population of 312,993. 9.60% of the population were under 5 years of age. Saidpur had a literacy rate (age 7 and over) of 74.07%: 76.30% for males and 71.82% for females, and a sex ratio of 101.69 males for every 100 females. 161,519 (51.60%) lived in urban areas.

According to the 2011 census of Bangladesh, Saidpur Upazila had 58,137 households and a population of 264,461. 58,868 (22.26%) were under 10 years of age. Saidpur had a literacy rate (age 7 and over) of 54.56%, compared to the national average of 51.8%, and a gender ratio of 977 females per 1000 males. 130,041 (49.17%) lived in urban areas.

As of the 1991 Bangladesh census, Saidpur has a population of 199422. Males constitute 52.19% of the population, and females 47.81%. This Upazila's eighteen up population is 98745. Saidpur has an average literacy rate of 38.7% (7+ years), and the national average of 32.4% literate.

== Points of interest ==
- Saidpur Airport
- Syedpur Railway Workshop
- Syedpur Christian Catholic Church
- Syedpur Christian Cemetery
- Syedpur BISIC Industrial Area
- Syedpur Cantonment Area
- Chini Mosque (established 1863)
- Martuza Institute (established 1882)
- Al Jamiatul Islamia Darul-Ulam Madrasa (established 1945)

== Administration ==
Saidpur Upazila is divided into 1 municipality (Saidpur Municipality) and six union parishads: Bangalipur, Botlagari, Kamarpukur, Kasirambelpukur, Khatamadhupur, and Saidpur Cantonment. The union parishads are subdivided into 42 mauzas and 39 villages.

Saidpur Municipality is subdivided into 15 wards and 43 mahallas.

== Notable people ==
- Zikrul Haque (1914—1971), physician and politician
- Mohammad Alim Uddin (1940—2015), former MP
- Amjad Hossain Sarker (1958—2021), former Mayor of Saidpur
- Rabeya Alim, former MP

== See also ==
- Upazilas of Bangladesh
- Districts of Bangladesh
- Divisions of Bangladesh
- Administrative geography of Bangladesh
