= Kishoreganj Upazila =

Kishoreganj কিশোরগঞ্জ
- Upazila
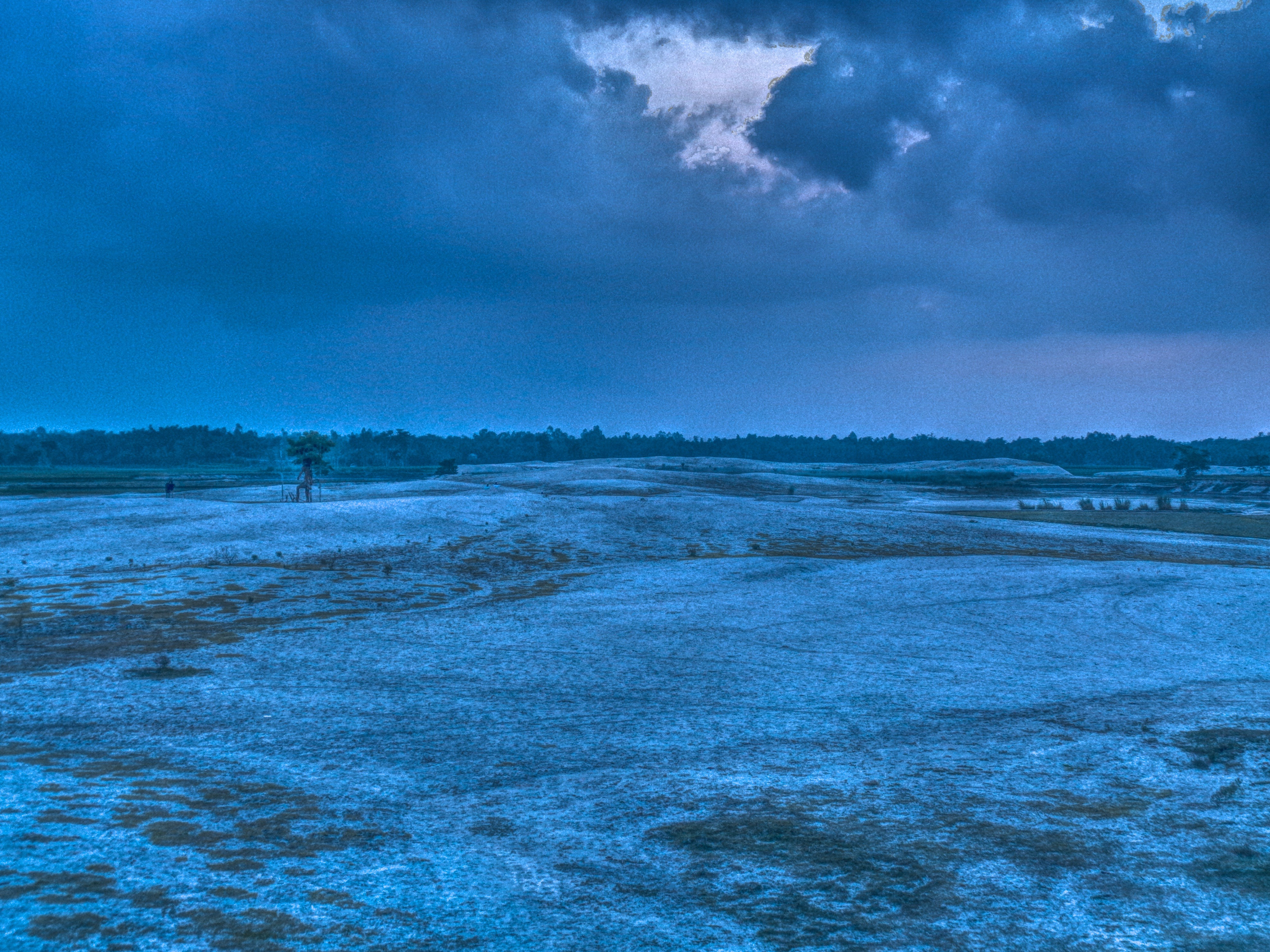
- View of island in Jamuneshwari River

- Coordinates: 25°54.7′N 89°1.5′E
- Country: Bangladesh
- Division: Rangpur
- District: Nilphamari

Area
  - Total: 205.01 km^{2} (79.15 sq mi)

Population (2022)
  - Total: 269,332
  - Density: 1,313.8/km^{2} (3,402.6/sq mi)
- Time zone: UTC+6 (BST)
- Postal code: 5320
- Website: Official Map of Kishoreganj

Kishoreganj Upazila mauza geocode map

Kishoreganj (Bengali: কিশোরগঞ্জ) is an upazila of Nilphamari District in the Division of Rangpur, Bangladesh.

== History ==
The upazila was named after Prince Kishore Chandro, son of Horish Chandro (1800–1900). Kishorganj was known for Nil cultivation while under British ruling. It was part of Nilphamari Mohokuma of Rangpur District. When Nilphamari became separate district, it became a Upazila of that district in 1983.

== Geography ==
Kishoreganj is located at 25.9111°N 89.0250°E. It has a total area of 205.01 km^{2}. The upazila is bounded by Jaldhaka upazila on the north, Taraganj upazila on the south, Gangachara upazila on the east, Nilphamari sadar and Saidpur upazilas on the west.

== Demographics ==
Historical population
Year	Pop. (000)	±%
1981	208	—
1991	246	+18.3%
2001	253	+2.8%
2011	261	+3.2%
2022	269	+3.1%
Source: Bangladesh Bureau of Statistics

Religions in Kishoreganj Upazila (2022)
Religion	Percent
Islam	84.14%
Hinduism	15.81%
Other or not stated	0.05%

According to the 2022 Bangladeshi census, Kishoreganj Upazila had 68,633 households and a population of 269,332. 9.84% of the population were under 5 years of age. Kishoreganj had a literacy rate (age 7 and over) of 63.82%: 67.37% for males and 60.48% for females, and a sex ratio of 96.02 males for every 100 females. 71,776 (26.65%) lived in urban areas.

According to the 2011 Census of Bangladesh, Kishoreganj Upazila had 65,798 households and a population of 261,069. 65,155 (24.96%) were under 10 years of age. Kishoreganj had a literacy rate (age 7 and over) of 38.48%, compared to the national average of 51.8%, and a sex ratio of 994 females per 1000 males. 8,444 (3.23%) lived in urban areas.

As of the 1991 Bangladesh census, Kishoreganj has a population of 246201. Males constitute 51.19% of the population, and females 48.81%. This Upazila's eighteen up population is 122233. Kishoreganj has an average literacy rate of 18.2% (7+ years), and the national average of 32.4% literate.

== Economy ==
The fertile land of Kishoreganj produces mainly potato, rice, ginger and corn. The season's first Potato harvest happens here and transported to all main cities at the beginning of December.

== Administration ==
Kishoreganj Thana, now an upazila, was formed in 1921. Kishoreganj was part of Dimla thana of Nilphamari Mohokuma before becoming a separate thana.

Kishoreganj Upazila is divided into nine union parishads: Bahagili, Barabhita, Chandkhana, Garagram, Kishoreganj, Magura, Nitai, Putimari, and Ranachandi. The union parishads are subdivided into 51 mauzas and 53 villages.

== Notable people ==
- Azharul Islam, former MP

== See also ==
- Upazilas of Bangladesh
- Districts of Bangladesh
- Divisions of Bangladesh
