= Jaldhaka Upazila =

Jaldhaka জলঢাকা
- Upazila
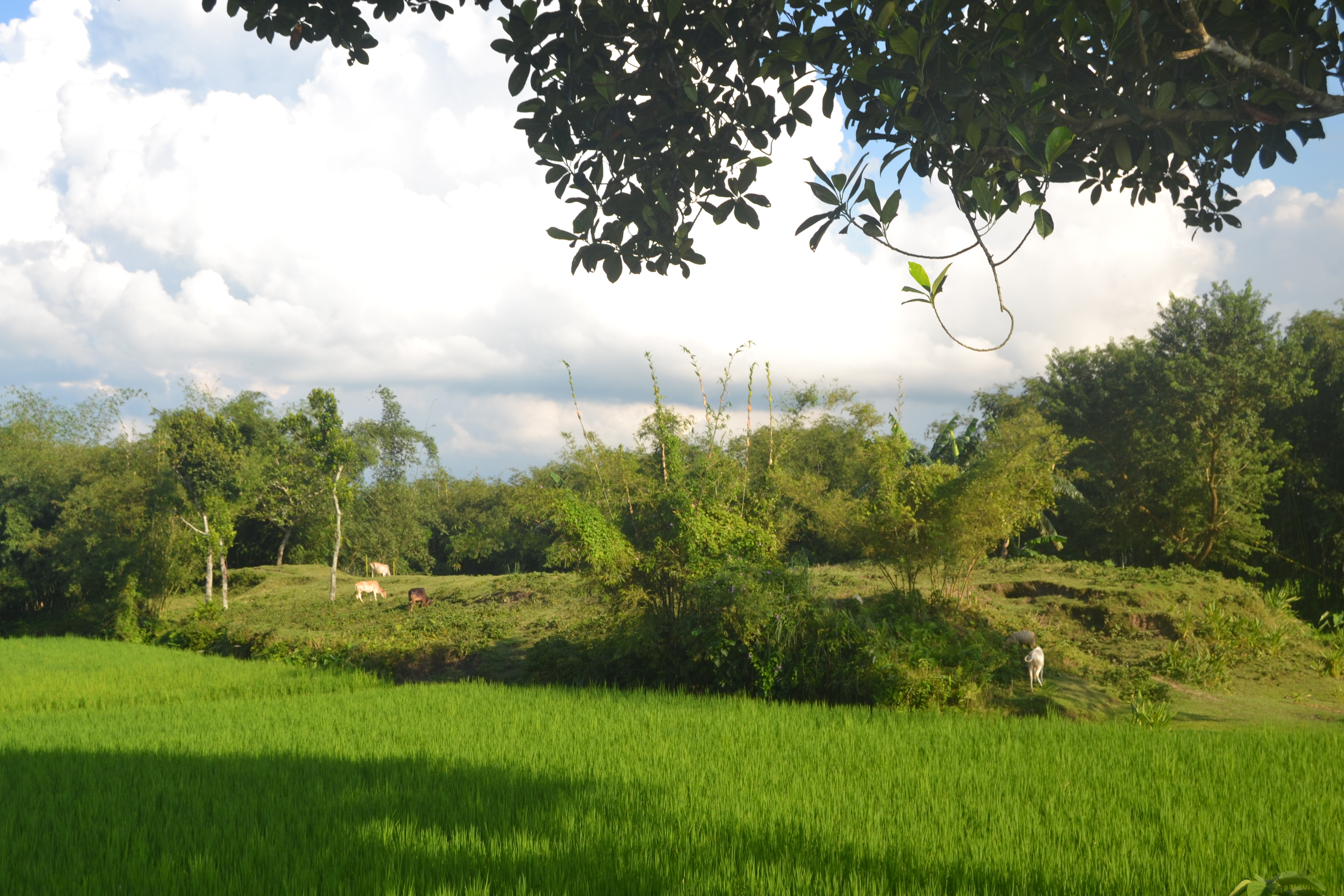
- Dharmapaler Garh

- Coordinates: 26°1′N 89°1.5′E
- Country: Bangladesh
- Division: Rangpur
- District: Nilphamari

Area
  - Total: 303.51 km^{2} (117.19 sq mi)

Population (2022)
  - Total: 386,801
  - Density: 1,274.4/km^{2} (3,300.7/sq mi)
- Time zone: UTC+6 (BST)
- Postal code: 5330
- Website: Official Map of Jaldhaka

Jaldhaka Upazila mauza geocode map

Jaldhaka (Bengali: জলঢাকা, Joldhaaka, means covered under water) is an upazila of Nilphamari District in the Division of Rangpur, Bangladesh.

== Geography ==
Jaldhaka is located at 26.0167°N 89.0250°E. It has 78,994 households and total area 303.51 km^{2}. Its eastern part is surrounded by Hatibandha Upazila, northern part by Dimla, western part by Nilphamari Sadar Upazila and southern part by Kishoreganj Upazila.

== Demographics ==
Religions in Jaldhaka Upazila (2022)
Religion	Percent
Islam	81.38%
Hinduism	18.58%
Other or not stated	0.04%

According to the 2022 Bangladeshi census, Jaldhaka Upazila had 93,754 households and a population of 386,801. 10.51% of the population were under 5 years of age. Jaldhaka had a literacy rate (age 7 and over) of 66.47%: 69.64% for males and 63.40% for females, and a sex ratio of 98.10 males for every 100 females. 63,777 (16.49%) lived in urban areas.

According to the 2011 Census of Bangladesh, Jaldhaka Upazila had 78,994 households and a population of 340,672. 90,608 (26.60%) were under 10 years of age. Jaldhaka had a literacy rate (age 7 and over) of 37.89%, compared to the national average of 51.8%, and a sex ratio of 987 females per 1000 males. 46,211 (13.56%) lived in urban areas.

Par the 2001 Bangladesh census, Jaldhaka had a population of 274736, including 141715 males, 133021 females; Muslim 217944, Hindu 56480, Buddhist 38, Christian 113 and others 361.

As of the 1991 Bangladesh census, the upazila has a population of 233885. Males constitute 51.5% of the population, and females 48.5%. This Upazila's eighteen up population is 114763. Jaldhaka has an average literacy rate of 18.4% (7+ years), and the national average of 32.4% literate.

== Administration ==
Jaldhaka Thana was formed in 1911 and it was turned into an upazila in 1983. It was under Dimla thana before 1911.

The upazila is divided into Jaldhaka Municipality and 11 union parishads namely: Balagram, Dharmapal, Douabari, Golna, Golmunda, Kaimari, Kathali, Khutamara, Mirganj, Shaulmari, and Simulbari. The union parishads are subdivided into 69 mauzas and 61 villages.

Jaldhaka Municipality is subdivided into 9 wards and 15 mahallas.

== See also ==
- Upazilas of Bangladesh
- Districts of Bangladesh
- Divisions of Bangladesh
