= Nilphamari District =

District of Rangpur Division in Bangladesh

Nilphamari District নীলফামারী জেলা
- District of Bangladesh
- Nilphamari District
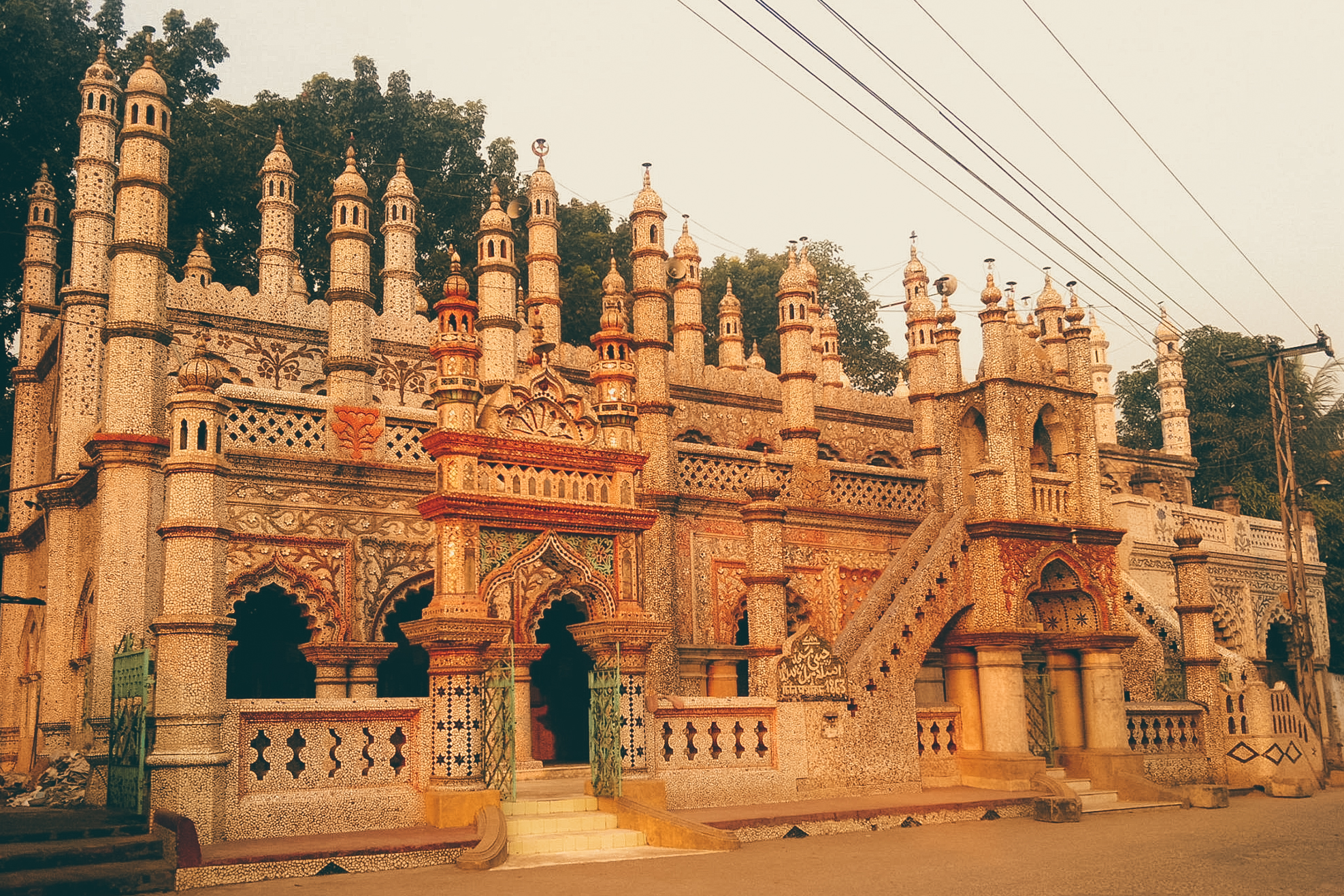
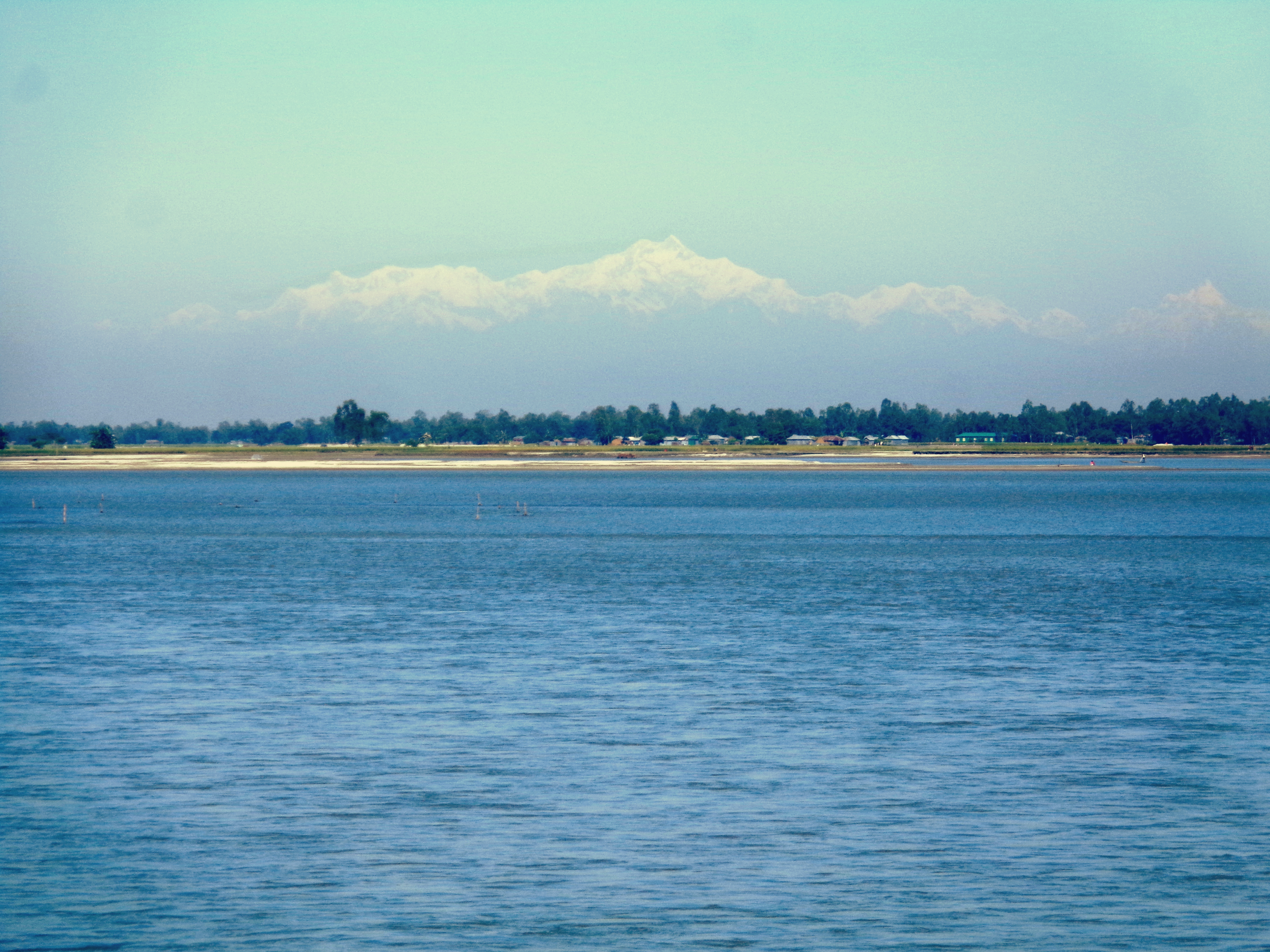
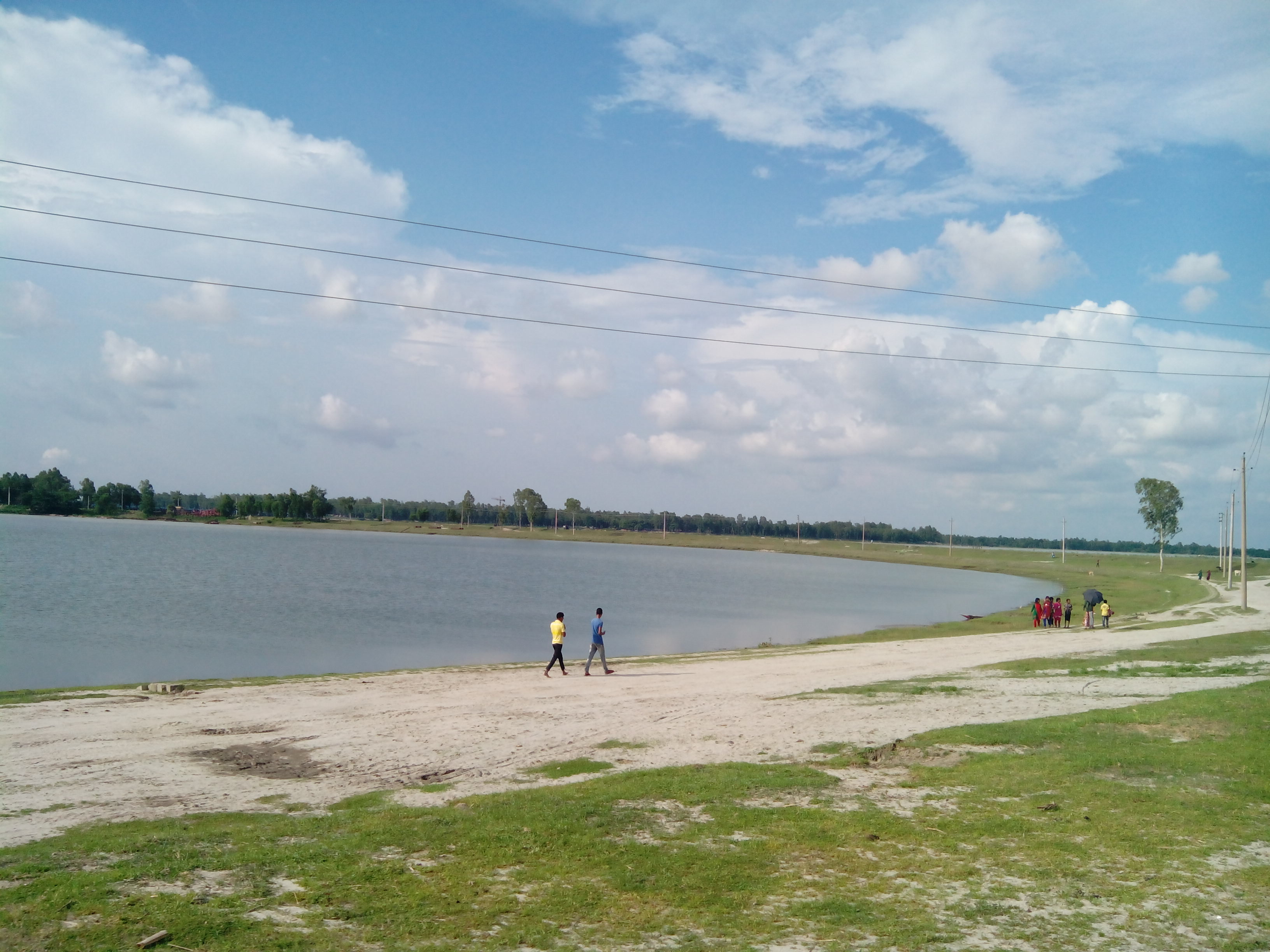
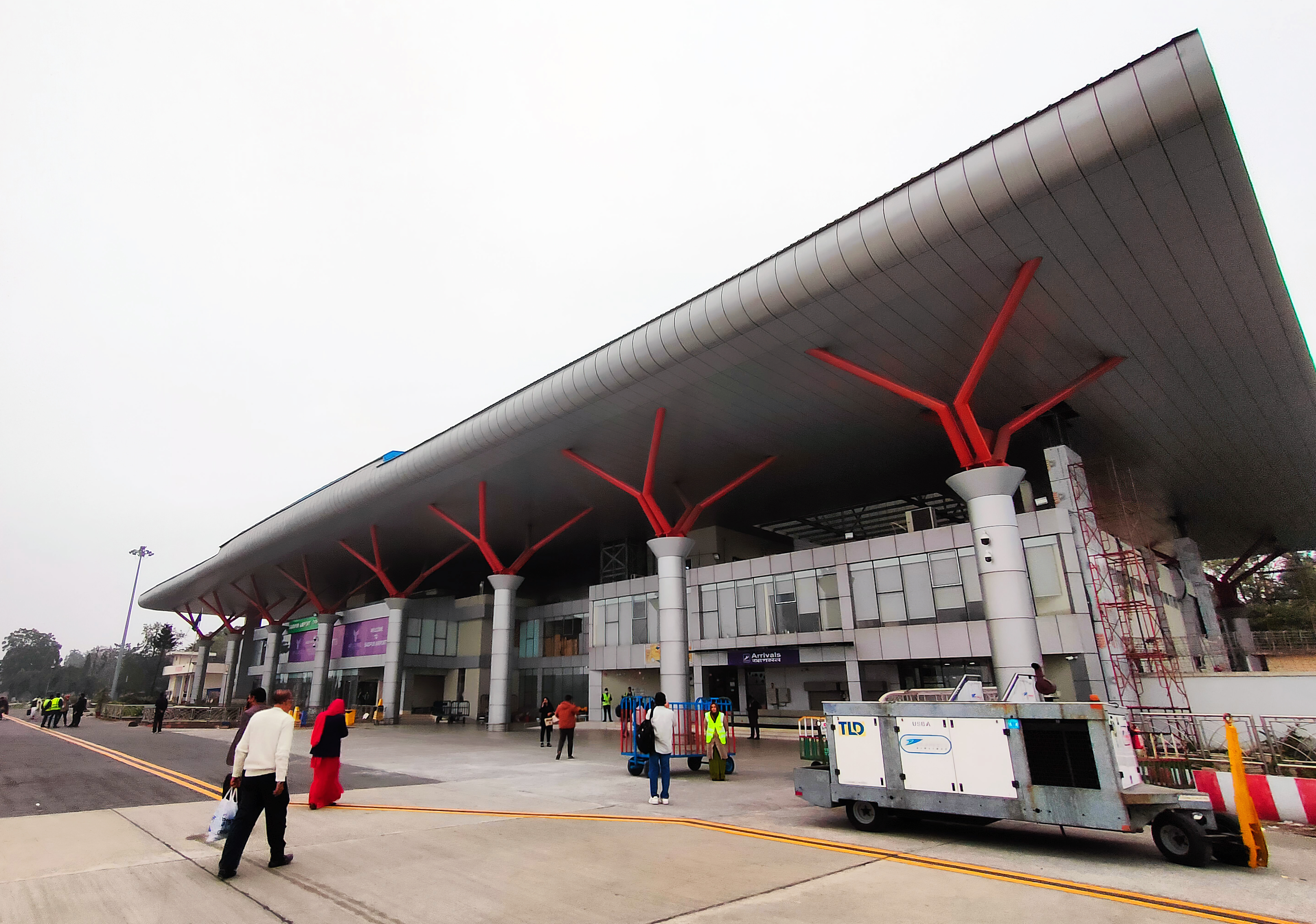
- Chini Mosque View of Kangchenjunga from Teesta River Teesta Canal Saidpur Airport
- Nicknames: Country of NIL (Blue) or নীলের দেশ
- Location of Nilphamari District in Bangladesh
- Expandable map of Nilphamari District
- Coordinates: 25.95°N 88.95°E
- Country: Bangladesh
- Division: Rangpur Division
- District Administration: 1984
- Seat: Nilphamari
- Largest City: Saidpur

Government
  - Deputy Commissioner: Md Humayun Kabir

Area
  - Total: 1,580.59 km^{2} (610.27 sq mi)

Population (2022)
  - Total: 2,092,568
  - Density: 1,353/km^{2} (3,500/sq mi)
- Demonym(s): Nilphamariala, Nilphamarians
- Time zone: UTC+06:00 (BST)
- Postal code: 5300
- Area code: 0551
- ISO 3166 code: BD-46
- HDI (2018): 0.668 medium – 7th of 21
- Website: nilphamari.gov.bd

Nilphamari District (Bengali: নীলফামারী জেলা) is a district in Northern Bangladesh. It is a part of Rangpur Division. It is about 350 kilometers to the northwest of the capital Dhaka. It has an area of 1,580.85 square kilometres (610.37 sq mi). Nilphamari is bounded by Rangpur and Lalmonirhat in east, Rangpur and Dinajpur in south, Dinajpur and Panchagarh in west, Cooch Behar of India in north. The headquarters of the district is in Nilphamari city, which is widely regarded as the industrial city of Northern Bangladesh. Saidpur which is major business center of the district also serves as connecting hub of Rangpur.

== Etymology ==
About 200 years ago, the British established farms for cultivating indigo (nil). The soil of this area was very fertile for indigo cultivation. As a result, a lot of nil kuthi and nil khamar (farm) were built here compared to the other districts. It is widely believed that the term "nil khamari" was derived from "nil khamar" by the local farmers. And then the word "Nilphamari" was derived from "Nil khamari".

== Geography ==
The many rivers in Nilphamari district include the Teesta, Buritista, Isamoti, Jamuneshwari, Dhum, Kumlai, Charalkata, Sorbomongola, Salki, Chikli, Chara and Deonai. There are four municipal corporations in Nilphamari district. Area of these Municipalities are Nilphamari, Saidpur, Jaldhaka and Domar, There are 60 unions, 370 mouzas and 378 villages in Nilphamari district.

== History ==
Nilphamari was previously under the Rajshahi division. The Nilphamari subdivision was established in 1875. It was a subdivision of the Rangpur District. It was turned into a district in 1984. The district consists of 6 upazilas, 4 municipalities, 60 union parishads, 370 mouzas and 378 villages.

=== Historical specialty ===
The historical Tebhaga movement spread over Domar and Dimla of this district in the 1940s. Indigo used to be cultivated extensively in this district. Saidpur is best known for its railway workshop. In 1870, the Assam-Bengal railway set up its largest workshop in Saidpur and many Biharis or Urdu-speakers came to work there. During the British rule the telephone exchange for the whole Assam-Bengal District was also situated in Saidpur, and it was the third-largest city of Bangladesh after Dhaka and Chittagong. Saidpur had the first airport in North Bengal. There was also a cantonment during the British period.

== Administration ==
Nilphamari District upazila geocode map

| Upazila (subdistrict) | Area (Km^{2}) | Population (2022) | Estimated Population (2026) |
|---|---|---|---|
| Nilphamari Sadar (Bengali: নীলফামারী সদর) | 373.09 | 523,950 | ~549,600 |
| Saidpur Upazila (Bengali: সৈয়দপুর alt. spelling: Syedpur) | 121.68 | 312,988 | ~328,300 |
| Jaldhaka (Bengali: জলঢাকা) | 303.52 | 386,790 | ~405,700 |
| Kishoreganj (Bengali: কিশোরীগঞ্জ) | 204.91 | 269,322 | ~282,500 |
| Domar (Bengali: ডোমার) | 216.36 | 282,626 | ~296,400 |
| Dimla (Bengali: ডিমলা) | 326.80 | 316,838 | ~332,300 |
| Total | 1546.59 | 2,092,568 | ~2,194,800 |

== Demographics ==
Historical population
| Year | Pop. | ±% p.a. |
|---|---|---|
| 1974 | 962,778 | — |
| 1981 | 1,152,119 | +2.60% |
| 1991 | 1,348,762 | +1.59% |
| 2001 | 1,571,690 | +1.54% |
| 2011 | 1,834,231 | +1.56% |
| 2022 | 2,092,568 | +1.21% |

According to the 2022 Census of Bangladesh, Nilphamari District had 505,605 households and a population of 2,092,568, of whom, 25.35% of the inhabitants lived in urban areas. 19.43% of the population was under 10 years of age. The population density was 1,353 people per km^{2}. Nilphamari had a literacy rate (age 7 and over) of 69.23%, compared to the national average of 74.80%, and a sex ratio of 99.15 males per 1000 females. The ethnic population was 127.

Religions in Nilphamari District (2022)
| Religion | Percent |
| Islam | 84.29% |
| Hinduism | 15.64% |
| Other or not stated | 0.07% |

Religion in present-day Nilphamari District
| Religion | 1941 (Note: 1941 figures are for Nilphamari subdivision of Rangpur district, which roughly corresponds to the present district.) | | 1981 | | 1991 | | 2001 | | 2011 | | 2022 | |
| Religion | Pop. | % | Pop. | % | Pop. | % | Pop. | % | Pop. | % | Pop. | % |
|---|---|---|---|---|---|---|---|---|---|---|---|---|
| Islam | 365,355 | 61.07% | 939,970 | 81.59% | 1,114,600 | 82.65% | 1,311,914 | 83.47% | 1,538,916 | 83.90% | 1,763,751 | 84.29% |
| Hinduism | 232,443 | 38.85% | 209,967 | 18.22% | 231,631 | 17.17% | 257,635 | 16.39% | 293,385 | 15.99% | 327,333 | 15.64% |
| Others (Note: Including Jainism, Christianity, Buddhism, Zoroastrianism, Judaism, Ad-Dharmis, or not stated) | 465 | 0.08% | 2,182 | 0.19% | 2,531 | 0.18% | 2,141 | 0.14% | 1,930 | 0.11% | 1,484 | 0.07% |
| Total Population | 598,263 | 100% | 1,152,119 | 100% | 1,348,762 | 100% | 1,571,690 | 100% | 1,834,231 | 100% | 2,092,568 | 100% |

Muslims make up 84.29% while Hindus are 15.64% of the population. There is a small population of 1,000 Christians in the district, mainly in Nilphamari Sadar and Saidpur upazilas. The local dialect is Rangpuri, but there are many speakers of Urdu and Bihari languages in Saidpur.

== Economy ==
Nilphamari is the main industrial centre of Rangpur Division. Apart from Uttara EPZ, Many Government and private industry situated here. Electricity has reached to almost every households. As of 2021, 100% people of this district get electricity. There are two(Jaldhaka and Saidpur) 132/33 KV Power Grid (National Power Grid-PGCB) Substation situated in Nilphamari. There is also a power plant in Saidpur of Nilphamari supplying 20 MW to National Power Grid-PGCB. Nilphamari Palli Bidyut Samity, a subsidiary of the people of Nilphamari supplies power to rural areas of the district. NESCO, a subsidiary company of BPDB, supplies power in urban areas and Bazars. Nilphamari has an agriculture-based economy. Nilphamari produces rice, wheat, potato, tobacco, and many seasonal crops. The major occupation of the people is farming. Among the working population 45.28% are farmers, 27.81% are farm labourer's, 3.42% are daily workers, 8.65% are businessmen, 6.07% are government and non-government employers, 8.77% have other occupations.

== Places of interest ==
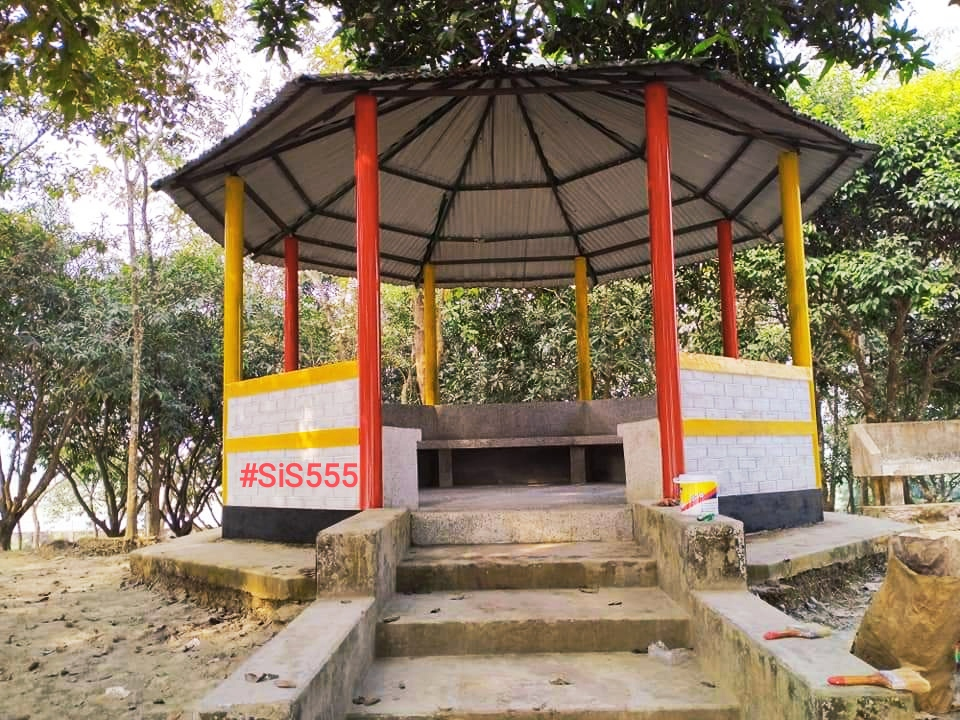

- Nilsagar Nilphamari: Nilsagar a historical dighi (big pond) which stands at Dhobadanga mauza of Gorgram union about 14 km southwest of Nilphamari district headquarters. During the reign of Raja Birat, there were many cow farms at Gorgram. Raja Birat dug a large dighi named Birat Dighi or Birna Dighi or Binna Dighi for the cows. After the independence of Bangladesh, the dighi was renamed as Nilsagar. A Hindu mandir stands on the east bank and an abode of a Muslim darvesh on the west bank of the dighi. The area of the dighi is 21.449 ha and depth ranges from 7m to 12m. The entire dighi is surrounded by brick walls. The main decorated ghat of the dighi was made by Raja Birat. Every year the banks of the dighi are used as a village fair site especially during the Baruni Snan festival of the full moon in the month of Baisakh. The Harikirtan singers usually play music during the fair, with many kinds of kirtan songs. Every year many tourists and various kinds of migratory birds come here. It is well known as a recreation zone and a picnic spot.
- The palace of Raja Harish Chandra (ninth century)
- Garh (Fort) of Raja Dharmapal and his palace (eighteenth century)
- Three domed Jami Mosque at Bherbheri (eighteenth century)
- Tomb of Hazrat Pir Mohiuddin (Kundupukur)
- Dimla Rajbari
- Dimla Forest
- Saidpur Airport
- Saidpur BISIC Industrial Area
- Railway Workshop in Saidpur
- Uttara Export Processing Zone
- Tista Barrage
- Saidpur Christian Catholic Church (1893)
- Saidpur Christian Cemetery
- Nat Settlement (prison, 1871)
- Leprosy Hospital
- Chini Mosque Saidpur
- Domar Maynamotir Garh
- Chilahati Land Port
- Parallel Watering System Bahagili Bridge Kishoreganj

=== Nilsagar ===
Nilsagar a famous historical dighi (big pond) that stands at Dhobadanga mauza of Gorgram union about 14 km southwest of Nilphamari district headquarters. During the reign of Raja Birat there were many cow farms at Gorgram. Raja Birat dug a large dighi named as Birat Dighi or Birna Dighi or Binna Dighi for the cows. After the independence of Bangladesh, the dighi was renamed as Nilsagar. A Hindu mandir stands on the east bank and an abode of a Muslim darvesh on the west bank of the dighi. The area of the dighi is 21.449 ha and depth ranges from 7m to 12m. The entire dighi is surrounded by brick walls. The main decorated ghat of the dighi was made by Raja Birat. Every year the banks of the dighi are used as a village fair site especially during the occasion of Baruni Snan festival in the full moon of the month of Baisakh. Usually, in the fair the Harikirtan singers play music with many kinds of kirtan songs. Every year many tourists and various kinds of migratory birds come here. It is well known as a recreation zone and a picnic spot.

== Education ==
The literacy rate of Nilphamari is 59.69% according to the 2011 Bangladesh census. There are 940 primary schools, 295 high schools, 95 colleges, 1 medical college, 2 government and 17 non-government technical institutes, 1 Primary Teachers Training Institute, 115 Dakhil Madrasas, 24 Alim Madrasas, 14 Fazil Madrasas and one Kamil Madrasa in Nilphamari.

The noted educational institutions in the district are:

- Nilphamari Medical College
- Zila Parishad School and College
- Cantonment Public School & College Saidpur, Nilphamari
- Saidpur Govt. Science College, Nilphamari
- Bangladesh Army University of Science and Technology, Saidpur, Nilphamari
- Balapara M L High School
- Balapara New Model Girls High School
- Kishoriganj Multilateral Model High School, Kishorganj, Nilphamari
- Dimla R. B. R. Government High School
- Lions School & College Saidpur, Nilphamari
- Nilphamari Government Mohila College
- Nilphamari Govt. College
- Dimla Govt. Women's College
- Nilphamari Government High School
- Nilphamari Government Girls' School
- Nilphamari Govt. Technical School and College
- Nilphamari Teachers Training College
- Collectorate Public School & College, Nilphamari
- Nilphamari Model College, Nilphamari
- Nilphamari Govt. College, Nilphamari
- SunFlower School & College Saidpur, Nilphamari
- Saidpur Government College
- Domar Government College
- Domar ML High School
- Domar Women College
- Domar Government Girls' School
- Domar Balika Nikaton School
- Domar Shohid Smrity Government Primary School
- Sonaray High School
- Sonaray Dristi Nondon Govt. Primary School
- Chhitmirganj Shalongram Fazil Madrasah

== Transportation ==
Nilphamari district is connected with Dhaka by Bus, Train and Air. Trains available in Nilphamari are Nilsagar Express & Chilahati Express (Dhaka), Barendro Express & Titumir Express (Rajshahi), Rupsha Express, Simanto Express & Rocket Mail (Khulna). Major Bus services are Greenline, Nabil, Shyamoli, Hanif, SA Travels, and BRTC. There is an Airport at Saidpur near to Saidpur Cantonment Area about 20 km from Nilphamari district town. UsBangla, Novoair, AirAstra, Biman Bangladesh Airirlines Respectively Giving Their Services To This Local Airport. Government Has Also Taken Initiatives For Reconstruction Works To Make It An International Airport.

== Notable people ==
- Advocate Dabir Uddin Ahmed, language movement activist in 1952
- Khairat Hosen, M.L.A., Minister of Food, Fisheries, and Livestock of Pakistan from 1955 to 1957
- Mashiur Rahman, also known as Jadu Mia, former Senior Minister of Bangladesh
- Shafiqul Ghani Swapan, politician and ex-minister
- Abdur Rauf, politician and former chief whip
- Ahsan Ahmed, Member of Parliament
- Asaduzzaman Noor, actor and politician
- Rathindranath Roy, folk singer
- Anisul Hoque, journalist, writer and editor
- Baby Naznin, singer
- Mustafa Kamal, 9th Chief Justice of Bangladesh
- Abu Shaeid, professional footballer
- Mohammed Al-Amin, professional footballer
- Dipok Roy, professional footballer
- Rishad Hossain, professional cricketer
