= Balapara Union =

Balapara Union বালাপাড়া ইউনিয়ন
- Interactive map of Balapara Union
- Country: Bangladesh
- Division: Rangpur Division
- District: Nilphamari
- Upazila: Dimla
- Time zone: UTC+6 (BST)
- Postal code: 5351
- Website: balaparaup.nilphamari.gov.bd

Balapara Union (Bengali: বালাপাড়া ইউনিয়ন) is a union of Dimla Upazila in Nilphamari District, Bangladesh.

== Geography ==
=== Location ===
North: India & Paschim Chhatnay Union

East: Khaga Kharibari Union, Purba Chhatnay Union and Dimla Sadar Union

South: Jaldhaka Upazila (Golna Union & Dharmapal Union)

West: Gomnati Union, Panga Motukpur Union

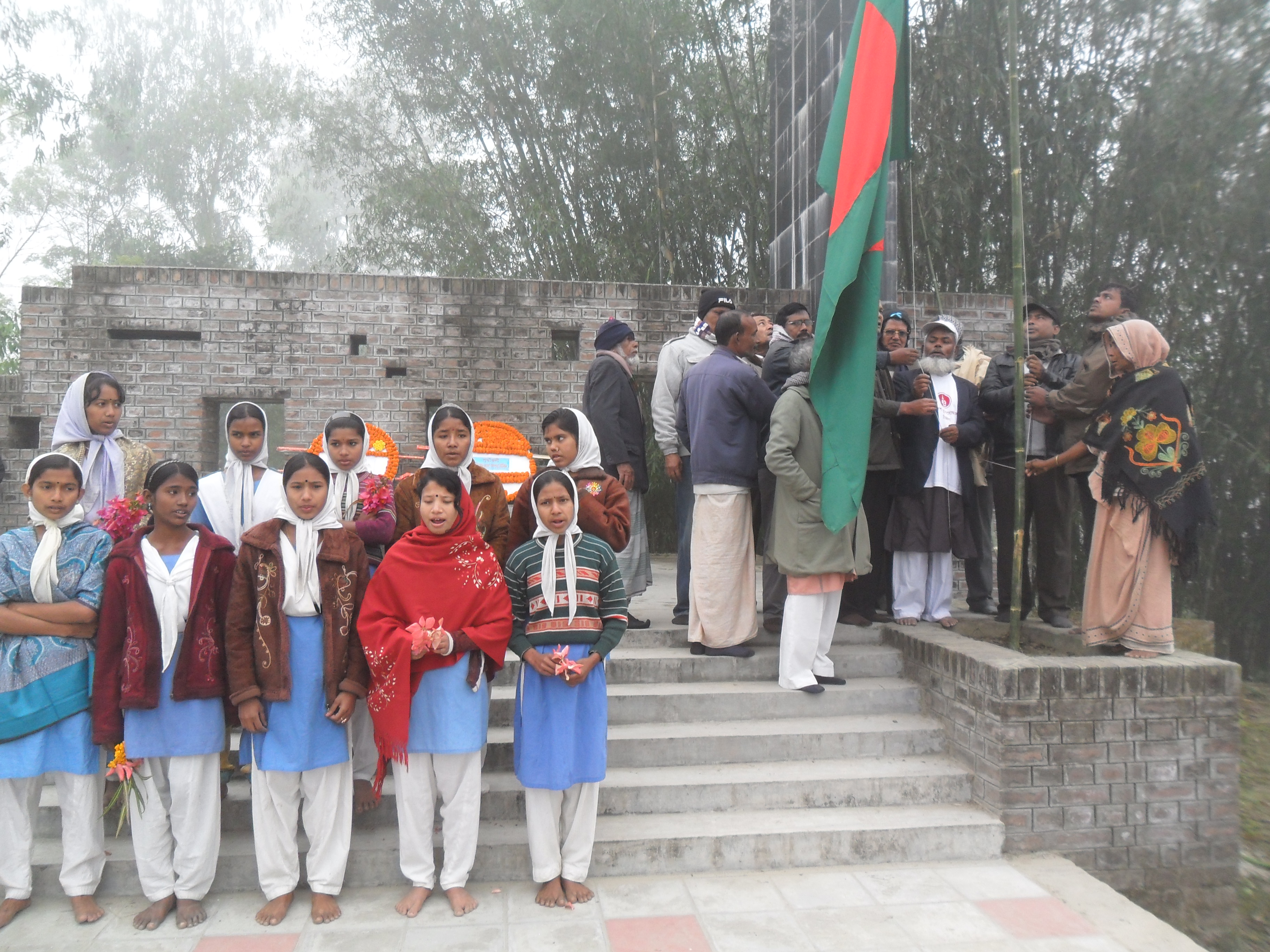
Balapara Mass Grave Flag Hoisting

== Demographics ==
According to the 2011 Bangladesh census, Balapara Union had 7,556 households and a population of 33,480.

== Administrative Area ==
Balapara Union consists of 10 mouzas (villages). These mouzas are divided into 9 administrative wards:

1. Shobhanganj Balapara
2. Uttar Chhatnai Balapara
3. Dakshin Chhatnai Balapara
4. Paschim Chhatnai Balapara
5. Dakshin Balapara
6. Uttar Sundarkhata
7. Nij Sundarkhata
8. Madhyam Sundarkhata
9. Rupahara
10. Dakshin Sundarkhata

The current chairman of this union is Md. Zahidul Islam Chowdhury, who assumed office after winning the fourth phase of the Union Parishad (UP) elections in 2021.

== Education ==
- Balapara ML High School
- Balapara New Model Girls High School
- Sundarkhata School and College
- Sundarkhata Shafikul Goni Swapon Fazil Madrasa
- South Balapara Govt. Primary School
- Rupahara Shishu Kali Government Primary School

== Notable people ==
- NK Alam Chowdhury, former member of parliament for Nilphamari-1 & Nilphamari-3.
- Md. Tobibul Islam, Former Chairman, Upazila Parishad, Dimla.
- Uttam Kumar Roy, Former Vice Chairman, Upazila Parishad, Dimla.

== See Also ==
- Dimla Upazila
