= Dimla Upazila =

Dimla ডিমলা
- Upazila
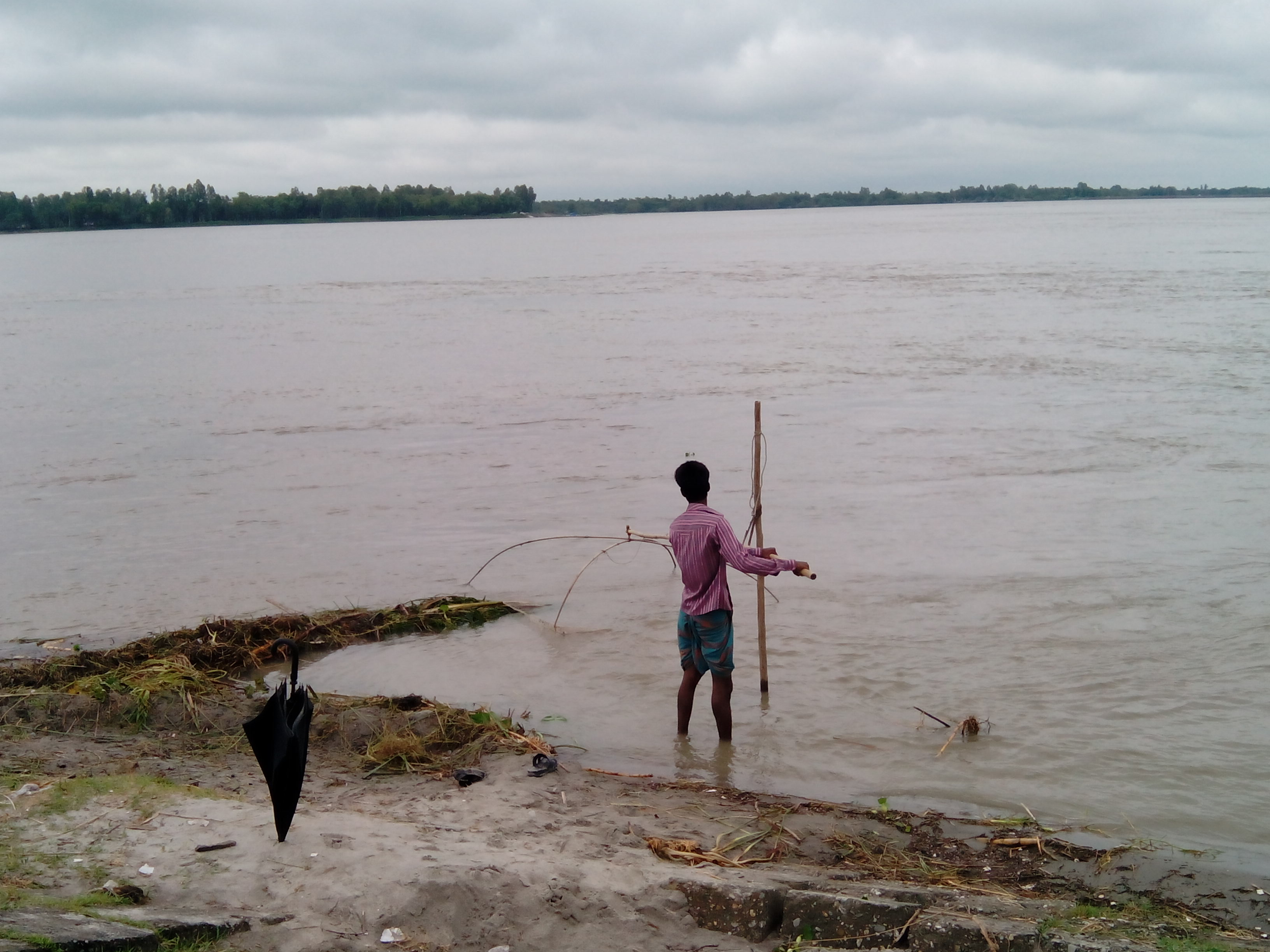
- Teesta River in Dimla Upazila

- Coordinates: 26°7.7′N 88°55.5′E
- Country: Bangladesh
- Division: Rangpur
- District: Nilphamari

Area
  - Total: 326.74 km^{2} (126.16 sq mi)

Population (2022)
  - Total: 316,846
  - Density: 969.72/km^{2} (2,511.6/sq mi)
- Time zone: UTC+6 (BST)
- Postal code: 5350
- Website: dimla.nilphamari.gov.bd

Dimla Upazila mauza geocode map

Dimla (Bengali: ডিমলা) is an upazila of Nilphamari District in the Rangpur Division, Bangladesh. It is the oldest thana of Nilphamari region (established in 1857).

== Geography ==
Dimla is located at 26.1278°N 88.9250°E. It has a total area of 326.74 km^{2}. It is bordered by West Bengal, India on the north, Hatibandha Upazila of Lalmonirhat District on the east, Jaldhaka Upazila on the south and Domar Upazila on the west.

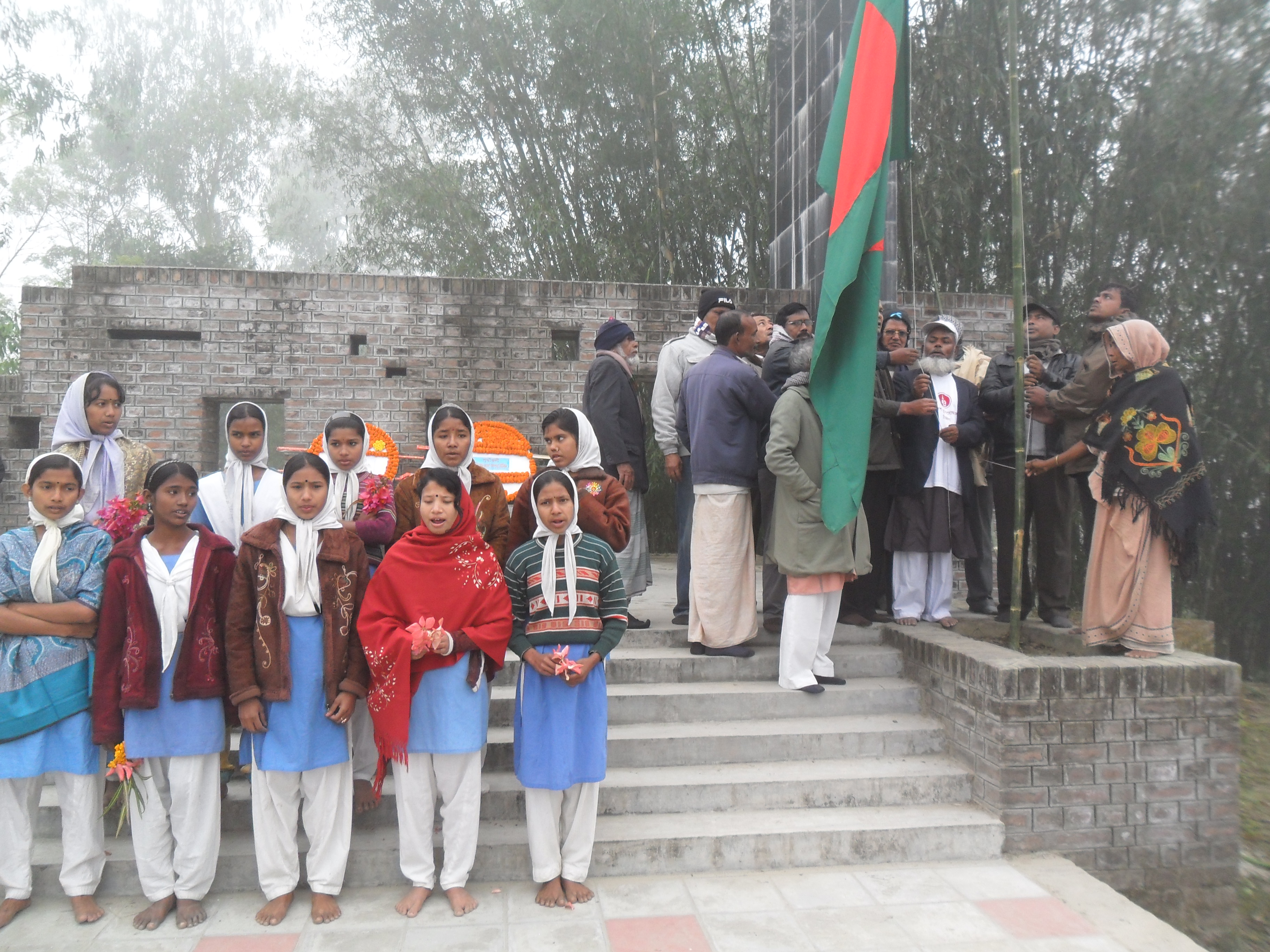
Balapara Mass Grave Flag Hoisting

== Demographics ==
Religions in Dimla Upazila (2022)
Religion	Percent
Islam	89.08%
Hinduism	10.90%
Other or not stated	0.02%

According to the 2022 Bangladeshi census, Dimla Upazila had 76,170 households and a population of 316,846. 10.17% of the population were under 5 years of age. Dimla had a literacy rate (age 7 and over) of 67.64%: 70.31% for males and 64.98% for females, and a sex ratio of 100.52 males for every 100 females. 49,282 (15.55%) lived in urban areas.

According to the 2011 Census of Bangladeshi, Dimla Upazila had 63,535 households and a population of 283,438. 74,464 (26.27%) were under 10 years of age. Dimla had a literacy rate (age 7 and over) of 42.21%, compared to the national average of 51.8%, and a sex ratio of 990 females per 1000 males. 19,719 (6.96%) lived in urban areas.

Par the 2001 Bangladeshi census, Dimla had a population of 223975; male 114453, female 109522; Muslim 198399, Hindu 25483, Buddhist 13 and others 80.

According to the 1991 Bangladeshi census, Dimla had a population of 187,696. Males constituted 51.24% of the population, and females 48.76%. The population aged 18 or over was 91, 421. Dimla had an average literacy rate of 19.4% (7+ years), against the national average of 32.4%.

== Administration ==
Dimla thana, now an upazila, was established in 1857.

Dimla Upazila is divided into ten union parishads:

1. Paschim Chhatnay
2. Balapara
3. Dimla Sadar
4. Khoga Kharibari
5. Gayabari
6. Nautara
7. Khalisha Chapani
8. Jhunagachh Chapani
9. Tepa Kharibari and
10. Purba Chhatnay.

The union parishads are subdivided into 53 mauzas and 53 villages.

Chairman :

Women Vice Chairman :

Vice Chairman :

Upazila Nirbahi Officer (UNO): Md. Imranuzzam

== Education ==
Dimla Upazila has a number of educational institutions, including degree colleges, secondary schools, technical institutes, and madrasas. Notable institutions include:

Colleges:

- Chhatnai College
- Dimla Govt. Women’s College
- Dimla Islamia College
- Gayakharibari Women’s College
- Janata College
- Paschim Chhatnai Women’s College
- Shaheed Ziaur Rahman College
- Jhunagachh Chapani Govt. Women’s' College
- Tista College

Secondary school & colleges:

- Doholpara Adarsha School and College
- Gayabari School and College
- Khaga Kharibari School and College
- Zila Parishad School and College
- Dimla Public School and College

Secondary schools:

- Balapara M L High School
- Adarsha Girls High School
- Akashkuri High School
- Balapara New Model Girls High School
- Chhatnai Colony Multilateral High School
- Chhatnai High School
- Daila Bi-Latera High School
- Dalia Chapani High School
- Dalia Shishu Nikaton High School
- Dimla Adarsha High School
- Dimla Govt. Girls High School
- Dimla High School
- Dimla R B R Govt. High School
- Dimla Titpara Adarsha High School
- Gaya Khari Bari Adarsha B/L Girls High School
- Jatua Khata B L High School
- Jhungach Chapani B.L. High School
- Kaliganj High School
- Khaga Barobari Girls B L High School
- Khaga Kharibari B.L. High School
- Masterpara Girls High School
- Nautara Abiunnessa B.L. High School
- Nautara Brezer Par High School
- Paschim Chhatnai Girls High School
- Paschim Kharibari High School
- Purba Chhatnai Adarsha Girls School
- Satjan High School
- Shalhati B.L. High School
- Baburhat High School
- Sonakhuli Haji Jaharatullah High School
- Tapakhari Bari High School
- Uttar Jhunagach Chapani Girls High School

Madrasahs:

- Akashkuri Munshipar Dakhil Madrasah
- Chhatnai Baro Besh Dakhil Madrasah
- Chotokhata Fazil Madrasah
- Dakhin Gayabari Futanirhat Abbas Ali Sarker Dakhil Madrasah
- Dakhin Kharibari M.P. Dakhil Madrasah
- Dakhin Sonakhali Alim Madrasah
- Dimla Dakhil Madrasah
- Dimla Fazil Madrasah
- Dohalpara Janata Alim Madrasah
- Janagach Chapani Mowlana Para Girls Dakhil Madrasah
- Jhuna Chapani Chowdhury Para Dakhil Madrasah
- Jhunagach Chapani Kakra Dakhil Madrasah
- Kakra Sukhan Dhighi Dakhil Madrasah
- Khalisha Chani Bapari Tola Alim Madrasah
- Khalisha Chapnani Fazil Madrasah
- Ramdanga Darul Huda Islamia Dakhil Madrasah
- Sammilita Bandra Kharibari Schhati Bala Para Dakhil Madrasah
- Satjan Dakhil Madrasah
- Shalhati Islamia Dakhil Madrasah
- Sundarkhata Shofikul Goni Shapan Fazil Madrasah
- Titpara Bar Jumma Darus Salam Dakhil Madrasah
- Uttar Chatanai Karamtia Dakhil Madrasah

Technical and vocational institutes:

- Dimla Computer Science and Polytechnic College
- Dimla Govt. Technical School and College
- Dimla Polytechnic Institute
- Dimla Technical and Business Management Institute
- Dimla Textile Institute
- Khagakhaibari Technical and Business Management Institute

== Notable people ==
- Mashiur Rahman Jadu Mia, former Senior Minister with the rank and status of Prime Minister.
- Shawfikul Ghaani Shawpan, former Minister of Housing and Public Works.
- NK Alam Chowdhury, former member of parliament for Nilphamari-1 & Nilphamari-3.
- Mansura Mohiuddin, former member of parliament for Nilphamari-1.
- Aftab Uddin Sarkar, former member of parliament for Nilphamari-1.
- Abdus Sattar, Member of parliament for Nilphamari-1.
- Jebel Rahman Ghaani, politician and chairman of Bangladesh National Awami Party-Bangladesh NAP

== See also ==
- Upazilas of Bangladesh
- Districts of Bangladesh
- Divisions of Bangladesh
