= Mashiur Rahman (politician, born 1924) =

Acting Prime Minister of Bangladesh from 1978 to 1979

Mashiur Rahman Jadu Mia
- মশিউর রহমান
- Rahman in 1954

Prime Minister of Bangladesh
- Acting; 29 June 1978 – 12 March 1979
- President: Ziaur Rahman
- Preceded by: Muhammad Mansur Ali
- Succeeded by: Shah Azizur Rahman

Minister of Road Transport and Bridges
- In office 19 February 1979 – 12 March 1979
- Preceded by: Majid-ul-Haq
- Succeeded by: SM Shafiul Azam

Member of the Bangladesh Parliament for Rangpur-1
- In office 13 July 1978 – 12 March 1979
- Preceded by: Abdur Rouf
- Succeeded by: Shawfikul Ghaani Shawpan

Member of National Assembly of Pakistan
- In office 12 June 1965 – 25 March 1969
- Preceded by: Himself
- Succeeded by: Position Abolished
- Constituency: NE-5 (Rangpur-V)
- In office 8 June 1962 – 7 June 1965
- Succeeded by: Himself
- Constituency: NE-5 (Rangpur-V)

Deputy Leader of the Opposition of Pakistan
- In office 8 June 1962 – 7 June 1965
- Succeeded by: Shah Azizur Rahman

Personal details
- Born: 9 July 1924 Dimla, Bengal Presidency, British India
- Died: 12 March 1979 (aged 54) Dhaka, Bangladesh
- Party: Bangladesh Nationalist Party (1978)
- Other political affiliations: Muslim League (before 1954); National Awami Party (1954–1978)
- Relatives: Shawfikul Ghaani Shawpan (son); Mansura Mohiuddin (daughter)
- Education: University of Dhaka

Mashiur Rahman (Note: Bengali: মাশিউর রহমান, romanized: Māshīur Rāhmān [ˈmaʃiuɾ ˈɾɑhːmɑn]) (9 July 1924 – 12 March 1979), also known as Jadu Mia (Bengali: জাদু মিয়া, lit. 'Man of Magic'), was a senior minister, with the rank and status of prime minister, in charge of the Ministry of Railways, Roads and Highways of Bangladesh from 29 June 1978 to 12 March 1979. He was the founder of the Bangladesh Nationalist Party; the whole process of transition to multi-party democracy was his brainchild. He named the party, and the election symbol was given to the party from his party, the National Awami Party (Bhashani) (NAP).

He also made the formal Declaration of Independence of Bangladesh from his party NAP (there were two major political parties in the then East Pakistan, one National Awami Party, NAP and Awami League), on the 23 March 1971, when Sheikh Mujib was still negotiating for the premiership of Pakistan with the military junta of Pakistan, not giving the formal declaration despite people's determination for a free, independent country.

== Early life and education ==
Mashiur Rahman was born on 9 July 1924, in Khaga Khari Bari village of Dimla under Nilphamari Subdivision in the then Bengal Presidency, British India. After passing his entrance examination from Rani Brindarani High School in Dimla, Rangpur, Mashiur Rahman would go on to pursue his higher education at Dhaka University.

== Political career ==
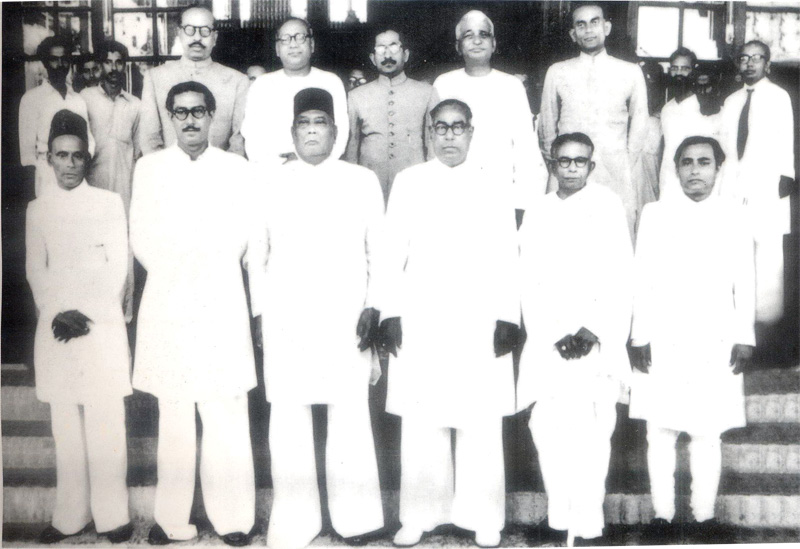
Rahman (back row, centre) at first elective East Bengal Legislative Assembly in 1954, with A. K. Fazlul Huq and Sheikh Mujibur Rahman

=== Pakistan Era (before 1971) ===
Mashiur Rahman was an elected member of the National Assembly of Pakistan in 1962 and led the assembly as deputy leader of the opposition. He was arrested in 1963 for his involvement in the anti-government movement. Before the liberation war, in 1971, Mashiur Rahman formally declared Bangladesh's independence and called for forming an all-party government at a public gathering at Paltan Maidan on 23 March. He became Abdul Hamid Khan Bhashani's deputy leader in the National Awami Party in the same period.

=== Bangladesh Era (after 1971) ===
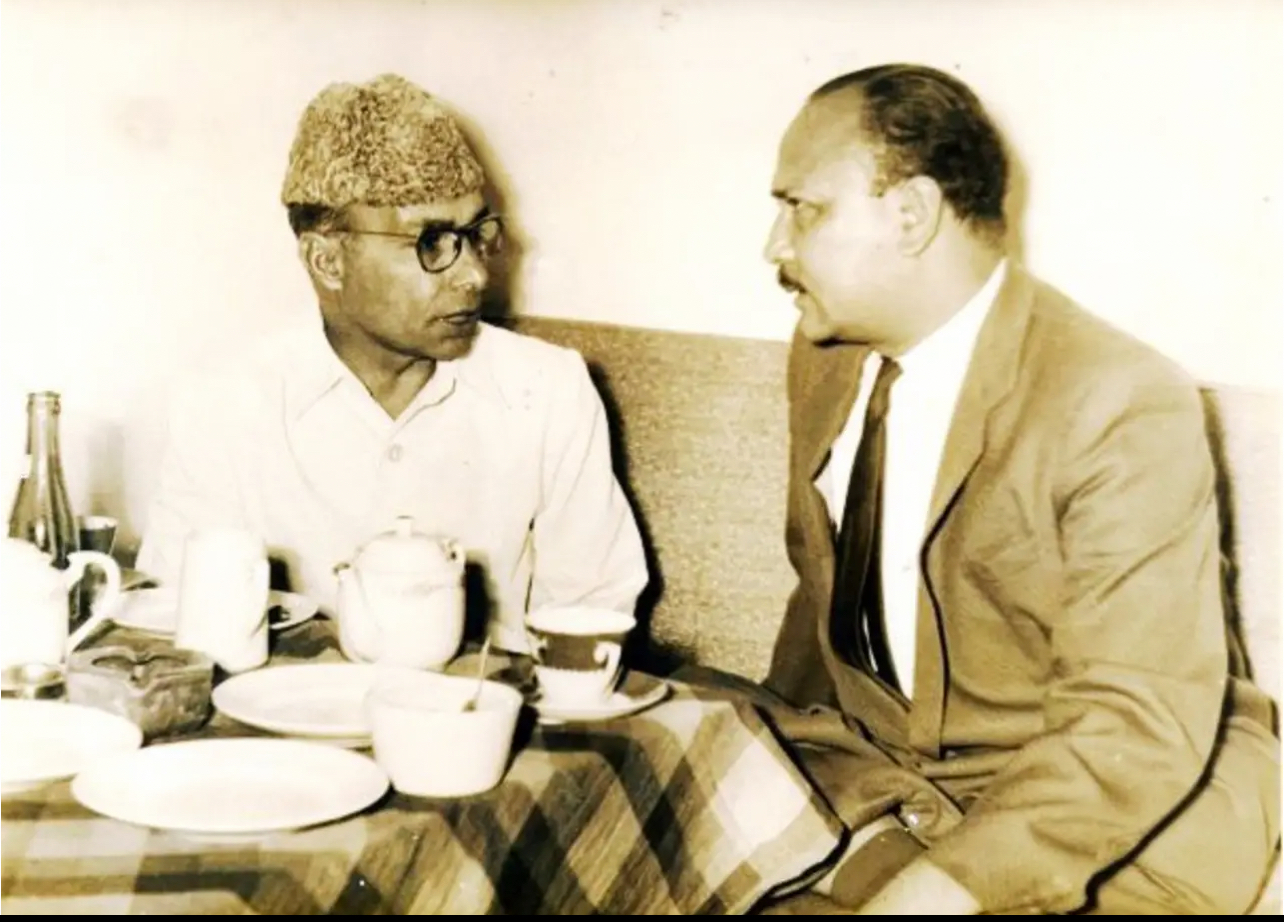
Mashiur Rahman and Fazal Ilahi Chaudhry

After Bhashani died in 1976, Mashiur Rahman became the president of the Bhashani faction of the National Awami Party. And in 1978, when he joined the Jatiyotabadi Front (Nationalist Front) with a huge portion of the National Awami Party (Bhashani), the party was dissolved, and remained so until it was revived after almost three decades in 2006 by his eldest son, Shafiqul Ghani Swapan. He was a founding member of the convening committee of the Bangladesh Nationalist Party and instrumental in the founding of the party. In the 1979 General Election, he ran and won in the Rangpur-1 seat, becoming a member of parliament. Despite plans and Ziaur Rahman's wish to appoint him prime minister, following his sudden death on 12 March 1979, Shah Azizur Rahman was appointed to the office on 15 April 1979. After the assassination of Sheikh Mujibur Rahman in 1975, the post of Prime Minister of Bangladesh was abolished. When Ziaur Rahman, who came to power in November 1975, became the president of Bangladesh on 21 April 1977, a ministerial system was re-established, and Mashiur Rahman served as a senior minister with the rank and status of prime minister in charge of the Ministry of Railways, Roads and Highways of Bangladesh from 29 June 1978 to 12 March 1979. Mashiur Rahman left a historical mark on strategic foreign partnerships and trade.

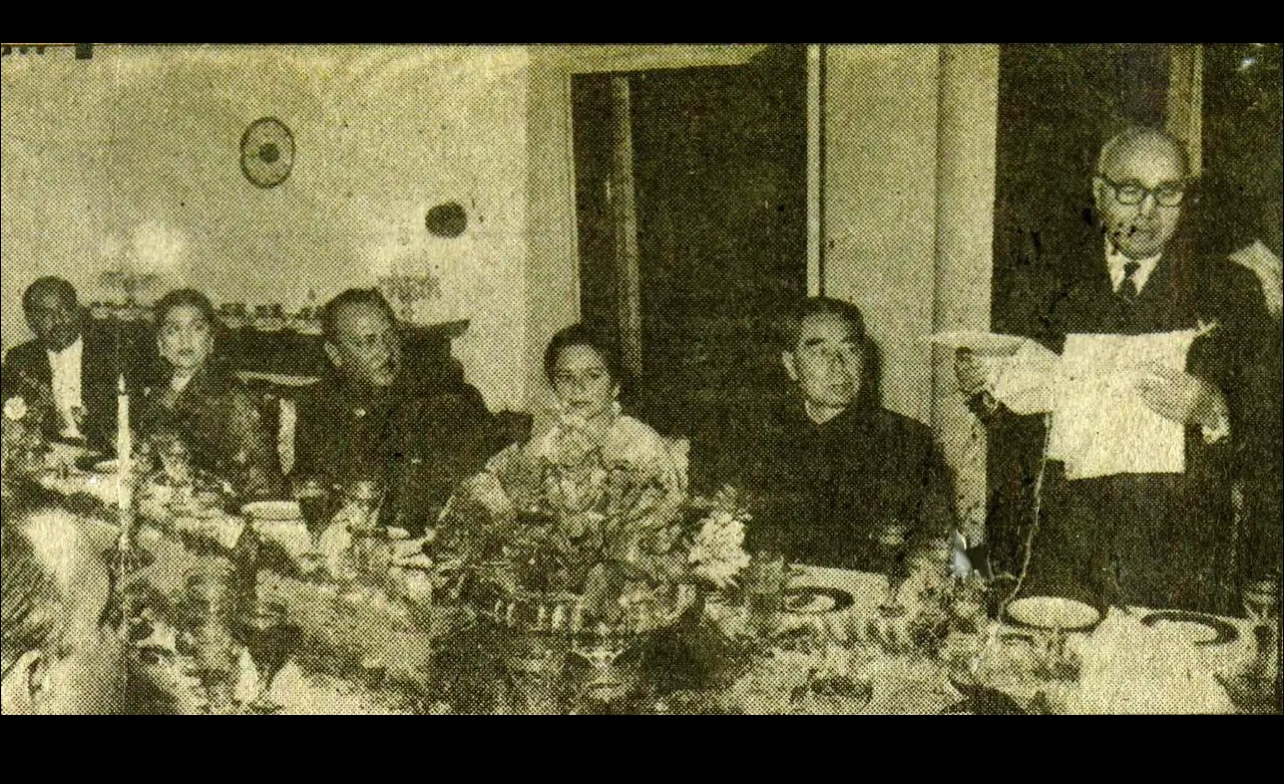
Premier Zhou Enlai and Mashiur Rahman

== Personal life ==
Mashiur Rahman was married to Sabera Mashiur Rahman and Amina Mashiur Rahman. He had 11 children, 5 sons and 6 daughters. His eldest son, Shawfikul Ghaani Shawpan, was a minister in the governments of President Ziaur Rahman and President Hussain Muhammad Ershad, while his eldest daughter, Mansura Mohiuddin, was a two-time member of parliament. His another daughter, Mukti Rahman, was married to diplomat Mohiuddin Ahmed, brother in law of President Hussain Muhammad Ershad. His brother is Shidu Miah, father of fashion designer Bibi Russell.

== Death ==
Mashiur Rahman died on 12 March 1979 in office as senior minister with the rank and status of prime minister. After his death, a three-day state mourning was observed and he was given a state funeral, being buried with full honours including a 19-gun salute. Many foreign dignitaries and heads of state wrote condolence letters after his sudden death, including US President Jimmy Carter.
