= Aftab Uddin Sarkar =

Bangladeshi politician

- আফতাব উদ্দিন সরকার

Member of the Bangladesh Parliament for Nilphamari-1
- In office 29 January 2014 – 6 August 2024
- Preceded by: Jafar Iqbal Siddiki
- Succeeded by: Abdus Sattar

Personal details
- Born: 6 April 1950 (age 76)
- Party: Bangladesh Awami League

Aftab Uddin Sarkar (born 6 April 1950) is a Bangladesh Awami League politician and a former Jatiya Sangsad member representing the Nilphamari-1 constituency 2014–2024.

== Career ==
Sarkar was involved in the 1969 student movement and was a former member of Mukti Bahini during the Bangladesh Liberation War. He is the president of the Dimla Upazila unit of the Bangladesh Awami League. He was elected to parliament from Nilphamari-1 on 5 January 2014 as a candidate of the Bangladesh Awami League. He was a member of the Parliamentary Standing Committee on the Ministry of Civil Aviation and Tourism.
