= Shafiqul Ghani Swapan =

Bangladeshi politician

Shawfikul Ghaani Swapan
- শফিকুল গণি স্বপন

Minister of Housing and Public Works
- In office 30 November 1986 – 27 March 1988
- Preceded by: K.M. Aminul Islam
- Succeeded by: Sheikh Shahidul Islam

Minister of Civil Aviation and Tourism
- In office 23 October 1986 – 29 November 1986
- Preceded by: AR Yusuf
- Succeeded by: A Sattar

State Minister of Civil Aviation and Tourism
- In office 12 October 1985 – 22 October 1986
- Preceded by: AR Yusuf
- Succeeded by: A Sattar

State Minister of Youth and Sports
- In office 8 March 1984 – 15 January 1985
- Preceded by: Ministry Established
- Succeeded by: Zakir Khan Chowdhury

Member of Parliament
- In office 10 May 1979 – 12 February 1982
- Preceded by: Mashiur Rahman
- Succeeded by: Moyezuddin Sarker
- Constituency: Rangpur-1
- In office 7 May 1986 – 3 March 1988
- Preceded by: Kazi Abdul Kuader
- Succeeded by: Mofazzal Hossain
- Constituency: Rangpur-3

Chairman of Bangladesh National Awami Party-Bangladesh NAP
- In office December 2006 – 23 August 2009
- Succeeded by: Jebel Rahman Ghaani

Personal details
- Born: 11 September 1948 Rangpur, East Bengal, Dominion of Pakistan
- Died: 23 August 2009 (aged 60) Dhaka, Bangladesh
- Party: Bangladesh National Awami Party-Bangladesh NAP
- Other political affiliations: BNP (1979-1982 and 1996-2001); Janadal Party (1983-1985); Jatiya Party (1986-1988)
- Relatives: Mashiur Rahman (father); Mansura Mohiuddin (sister)
- Education: Queen Mary, University of London

Shawfikul Ghaani Swapan was a Bangladeshi politician and the chairman of the Bangladesh National Awami Party-Bangladesh NAP. During his political career, he served as a member of parliament twice, and held cabinet positions in both the Zia and Ershad governments. His positions included serving as the state minister of defence, state minister of youth and sports, minister of civil aviation and tourism, and minister of housing and public works.

== Early life ==
Swapan was born on 11 September 1948 in Nilphamari Sadar, Nilphamari District. He was the eldest son of former senior minister Mashiur Rahman, also known as, Jadu Mia. He studied at Notre Dame College in Dhaka and later attended Queen Mary, University of London for his higher studies, going on to graduate in 1968. He was married to Nazhat Ghani Shabnam.

== Career ==
On 10 May 1979, he won the by-election in what was then Rangpur-1 (the current Nilphamari-1 constituency) as the candidate of the Bangladesh Nationalist Party (BNP), after the seat was left vacant due to the death of his father, Mashiur Rahman. On 1 January 1986, when the Jatiya Party (E) was formed, he was a founding member and made the organizing secretary of the party. Later that year, during the general election, he ran in both the Rangpur-3 and Nilphamari-1 constituencies as the Jatiya Party (E) candidate, going on to win both seats. Consequently, in line with the constitution, he surrendered the Nilphamari-1 seat (triggering a by-election in the constituency) and went on to represent Rangpur Sadar (Rangpur-3) in parliament. From the mid to late 1980s, Swapan served as a cabinet member of President Ershad's Jatiya Party (E) government, holding many different portfolios. Throughout this period, he was made responsible for the Ministry of Youth and Sports (1984–1985), Ministry of Civil Aviation and Tourism (1985–1986), and the Ministry of Housing and Public Works (1986–1988).

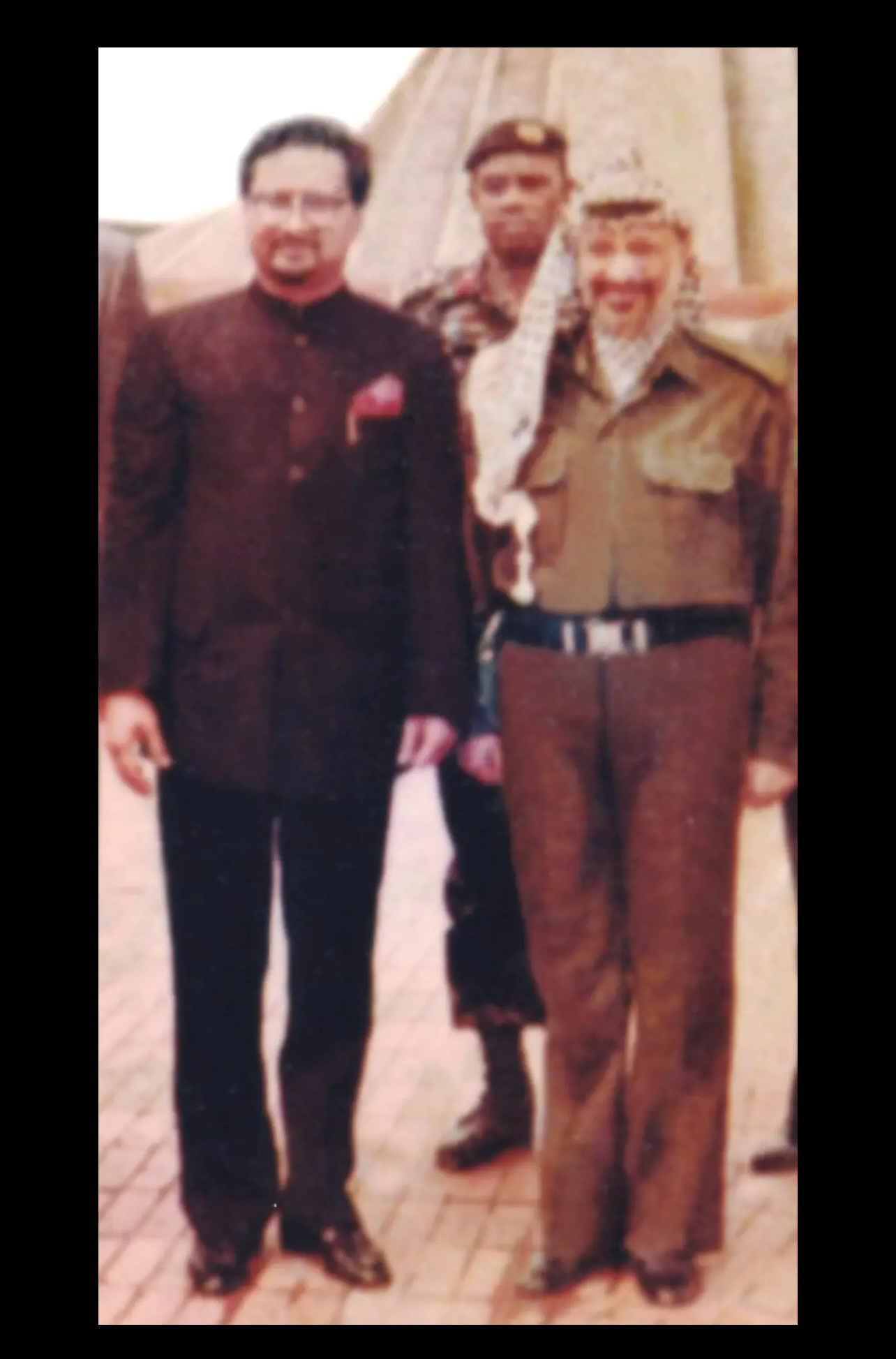

During this time, he also briefly served as the state minister of Defence and state minister for labour and employment. In December 2006, he revived the Bhashani branch of the National Awami Party (NAP) as Bangladesh National Awami Party-Bangladesh NAP, the party had been dissolved in the late 70s after his father, Mashiur Rahman, joined the Nationalist Front (later BNP) with a large portion of the party. Swapan led the party as its chairman until his death. After his death, his eldest son, Jebel Rahman Ghaani, was elected the chairman of the party.

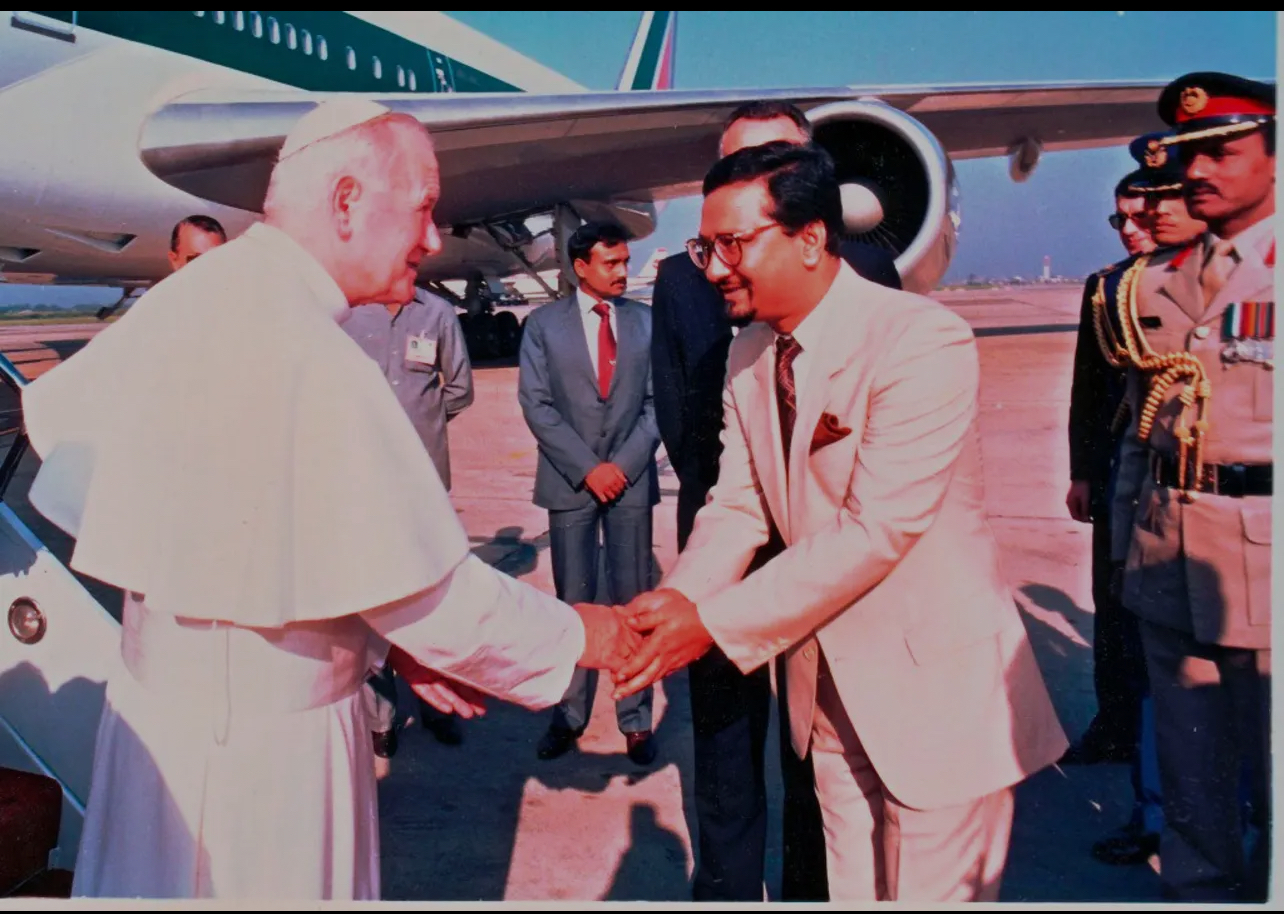
Pope John Paul II

== Death ==
Swapan died on 23 August 2009 in a hospital in Dhaka, Bangladesh. His janaza (funeral prayer) was held at the South Plaza of the Jatiya Sangsad Bhaban (National Parliament House) after which he was taken to his ancestral home in Dimla, Nilphamari where another janaza was held before he was finally laid to rest at his family graveyard in Dimla.
