= Mofazzal Hossain =

Bangladeshi politician

- মোফাজ্জল হোসেন

Member of Parliament from Rangpur-3
- In office 1988–1990
- Preceded by: Shafiqul Ghani Swapan
- Succeeded by: Hussain Muhammad Ershad

Personal details
- Born: Rangpur District
- Party: Jatiya Party

Mofazzal Hossain is a politician from the Rangpur District of Bangladesh who was elected a member of parliament from Rangpur-3.

== Career ==
Mofazzal was elected to parliament from Rangpur-3 as an independent candidate in 1988. He was defeated from Rangpur-3 constituency in June 1996 as an independent candidate.
