= Hamida Banu Shova =

Bangladeshi politician

Member of the Bangladesh Parliament for Nilphamari-1
- In office 1 October 2001 – 29 October 2006
- Preceded by: NK Alam Chowdhury
- Succeeded by: Jafar Iqbal Siddiki

Personal details
- Born: 2 February 1954 (age 71)
- Party: Bangladesh Awami League

Hamida Banu Shova (born 2 February 1954) is the founder and chairperson of Queens University, Bangladesh. She established this university in 1996.

== Career ==
Shova is a former Jatiya Sangsad member. She served as female MP for constituency (Nilphamari-1) from 2001 to 2006 under the banner of the Awami League. She is nominated Assistant Secretaries of Sub-Committee of Bangladesh Awami League.
