= Zila Parishad School and College =

- Zila Parishad School
- Dimla, Nilphamari; 5350; Bangladesh

Information
- Type: Non Govt. School & College
- Founded: 2013
- School board: Board of Intermediate and Secondary Education, Dinajpur
- School district: Nilphamari District
- School code: 6735
- President: Mizanur Rahman Chowdhury
- Administrator: Zila Parishad, Nilphamari
- Principal: Md. Moniruzzaman (acting)
- Grades: 6-12
- Classes: 7
- Language: Bengali
- Hours in school day: 06
- Nickname: ZPSC
- Website: https://zpscd.edu.bd/

Zila Parishad School and College (Bengali: জেলা পরিষদ স্কুল অ্যান্ড কলেজ) is an educational institution located in the heart of Dimla Upazila in Nilphamari District. The institution is managed by the 'Zila Parishad, Nilphamari'.

== Location ==
Zila Parishad School and College is an educational institution located at Baburhat in Dimla Upazila, Nilphamari. Its Educational Institute Identification Number (EIIN) is 136507.

== See Also ==
- Dimla Upazila
- Nilphamari District
- Dimla Rani Brindarani Govt. High School
- Nilphamari Government High School
