= Minister of Civil Aviation and Tourism =

Cabinet Minister of Bangladesh

People's Republic of Bangladesh Minister of Civil Aviation and Tourism
- বেসামরিক বিমান পরিবহন ও পর্যটন মন্ত্রী
- Government Seal of Bangladesh

- Flag of Bangladesh

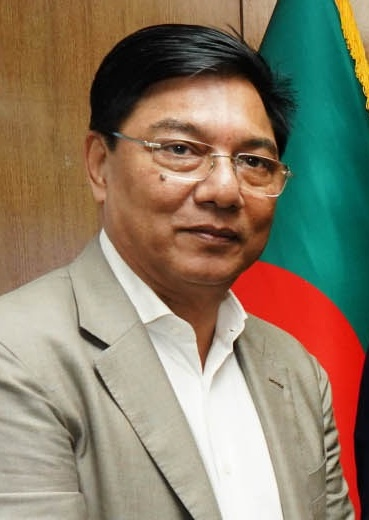
- Incumbent; M. Rashiduzzaman Millat since 21 August 2026
- Ministry of Civil Aviation and Tourism
- Style: The Honourable (formal); His Excellency (diplomatic)
- Type: Cabinet minister
- Status: Adviser
- Member of: Cabinet; Advisory Council
- Reports to: Chief Adviser
- Seat: Bangladesh Secretariat
- Nominator: Chief Adviser of Bangladesh
- Appointer: President of Bangladesh; on the advice of the chief adviser
- Term length: Interim or the; chief adviser's pleasure
- Formation: 20 August 1975; 51 years ago
- First holder: Kazi Anwarul Haque
- Salary: ৳245000 (US$2,000) per month (incl. allowances)
- Website: mocat.gov.bd

The minister of civil aviation and tourism is the minister in charge of the Ministry of Civil Aviation and Tourism in the government of Bangladesh. He is also the minister of all departments and agencies under the Ministry of Civil Aviation and Tourism. In September 1962, a department called Biman Paribahan was formed. A separate ministry, the Ministry of Shipping, Inland Water Transport and Tourism, was later formed, but in January 1986, the ministry was transformed into a division of the Ministry of Communications. In December 1986, a ministry called the Ministry of Civil Aviation and Tourism was created.

== History ==
On 24 March 1972, it was transformed into a single division under the Ministry of Defense. On 8 July 1986, the Ministry of Civil Aviation and Tourism was re-established as an independent ministry.

== List of ministers, advisers and state ministers ==
Listed here are all the ministers, advisors, state ministers and deputy ministers.

Political parties

- Bangladesh Awami League
- Bangladesh Nationalist Party
- Jatiya Party (Ershad)
- Workers Party of Bangladesh

Other factions

- Independent

Portrait	Officeholder (birth–death) Constituency	Term of office			Designation	Administration
Portrait	Officeholder (birth–death) Constituency	From	To	Period	Designation	Administration
	Shah Moazzem Hossain	20 August 1975	9 November 1975	81 days	Minister of State	(Military administration)
	Muhammad Ghulam Tawab	9 November 1975	1 May 1976	174 days	DMLA	(Military administration)
	Khademul Bashar	3 May 1976	5 September 1976	125 days	Chief of Air Staff	(Military)
	Abdul Gafoor Mahmud	6 September 1976	3 July 1978	1 year, 300 days	Chief of Air Staff	(Military)
	Kazi Anwarul Haque	4 July 1978	14 July 1979	1 year, 10 days	Minister	Zia
	M. A. Matin	15 July 1979	22 August 1979	38 days	Minister	Zia
	Kazi Anwarul Haque	23 August 1979	24 April 1980	245 days	Minister	Zia
	KM Obaidur Rahman	25 April 1980	26 November 1981	1 year, 215 days	Minister	Zia / Sattar
	AKM Maidul Islam	27 November 1981	18 January 1985	3 years, 52 days	Minister	Ershad
	A. R. Yusuf	19 January 1985	11 October 1985	265 days	Minister	Ershad
	Shafiqul Ghani Swapan	12 October 1985	22 October 1986	1 year, 10 days	Minister of State	Ershad
	Shafiqul Ghani Swapan	23 October 1986	29 November 1986	37 days	Minister	Ershad
	M. A. Sattar	30 November 1986	26 March 1988	1 year, 117 days	Minister of State	Ershad
	M. A. Sattar	27 March 1988	9 December 1988	257 days	Minister	Ershad
	Ziauddin Ahmed Bablu	10 December 1988	18 July 1989	220 days	Minister	Ershad
	HMA Gaffar	19 July 1989	9 October 1990	1 year, 82 days	Minister	Ershad
	Rafiqul Islam	10 October 1990	19 March 1991	160 days	Adviser	Sahabuddin
	Abdul Mannan	20 March 1991	19 August 1995	4 years, 152 days	Minister of State	Khaleda I
	Syed Manzur Elahi	20 August 1995	22 June 1996	307 days	Adviser	Habibur
	Sheikh Hasina	23 June 1996	28 January 1997	219 days	Adviser	Hasina I
	Muhiuddin Khan Alamgir	29 January 1997	30 December 1997	335 days	State Minister	Hasina I
	Mosharraf Hossain	31 December 1997	15 July 2001	3 years, 196 days	Minister	Hasina I
	Syed Ashraful Islam	6 January 2001	15 July 2001	190 days	State Minister	Hasina I
	Syed Ishtiaq Ahmed	16 July 2001	10 October 2001	86 days	Adviser	Latifur Rahman
	Mir Mohammad Nasiruddin	11 October 2001	17 November 2005	4 years, 37 days	State Minister	Khaleda II
	Mirza Fakhrul Islam Alamgir	18 November 2005	27 October 2006	343 days	State Minister	Khaleda II
	M. Azizul Haq	31 October 2006	11 January 2007	72 days	Adviser	Iajuddin
	M. A. Matin	14 January 2007	10 January 2008	361 days	Adviser	Fakhruddin
	Mahbub Jamil	21 January 2008	6 January 2009	351 days	Special Assistant	Fakhruddin
70x	GM Quader	7 January 2009	7 December 2011	2 years, 334 days	Minister	Hasina II
	Faruk Khan	7 December 2011	21 November 2013	1 year, 349 days	Minister	Hasina II
	A.B.M. Ruhul Amin Howlader	24 November 2013	12 January 2014	49 days	Minister	Hasina III
	Rashed Khan Menon	12 January 2014	3 January 2018	3 years, 356 days	Minister	Hasina III
	A. K. M. Shahjahan Kamal	3 January 2018	6 January 2019	1 year, 3 days	Minister	Hasina IV
	Md. Mahbub Ali	7 January 2019	11 January 2024	5 years, 4 days	State Minister	Hasina IV
	Faruk Khan	11 January 2024	6 August 2024	208 days	Minister	Hasina V
	A. F. Hassan Ariff	22 August 2024	20 December 2024	120 days	Adviser	Yunus
	Muhammad Yunus	20 December 2024	15 April 2025	116 days	Chief Adviser	Yunus
	Sheikh Bashir Uddin	15 April 2025	17 February 2026	308 days	Adviser	Yunus
	Afroza Khanam Rita	17 February 2026	Incumbent	242 days	Minister	Tarique
