= Shahrin Islam Tuhin =

Bangladeshi politician

Shahrin Islam Chowdhury Tuhin
- শাহরিন ইসলাম চৌধুরী তুহিন
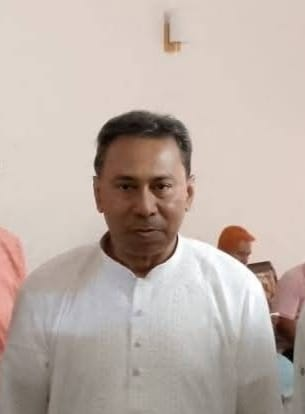
- Tuhin in 2025

Member of Parliament
- In office 15 February 1996 – 12 June 1996
- Preceded by: Abdur Rouf
- Succeeded by: NK Alam Chowdhury
- Constituency: Nilphamari-1

Personal details
- Born: Rajshahi, East Pakistan now Bangladesh
- Party: Bangladesh Nationalist Party
- Spouse: Ayesha Islam
- Relations: Saiful Islam Duke (brother)
- Parents: M. Rafiqul Islam (father); Selima Islam (mother)
- Relatives: See Majumder–Zia family

Shahrin Islam Chowdhury Tuhin (Bengali: শাহরিন ইসলাম চৌধুরী তুহিন), also known by his daak naam Tuhin, is a Bangladesh Nationalist Party politician and a former member of parliament for Nilphamari-1. He is the nephew of former prime minister Khaleda Zia.

== Early life and family ==
Shahrin Islam Tuhin was born in Rajshahi to a Bengali Muslim family. His ancestral home is in the village of Gomnati, Domar, Nilphamari District. His father, Rafiqul Islam Chowdhury, was a professor of economics and dean at the University of Rajshahi and the former VC of Islamic University, Bangladesh. Tuhin's mother, Selima Islam, is the eldest sister of former prime minister Khaleda Zia and the descendant of Murad Khan, a 16th-century Middle Eastern immigrant.

== Career ==
Tuhin formerly served as the president of the Nilphamari District branch of the Bangladesh Nationalist Party (BNP), a political party founded by President Ziaur Rahman, the husband of his maternal aunt. He took part in the February 1996 Bangladeshi general election as a BNP candidate and won a seat in parliament for the Nilphamari-1 constituency.

He also competed in the elections of June 1996 and 2001, but was unable to win a seat in either. In 2016, Tuhin was made a member of the executive committee in the Bangladesh Nationalist Party.

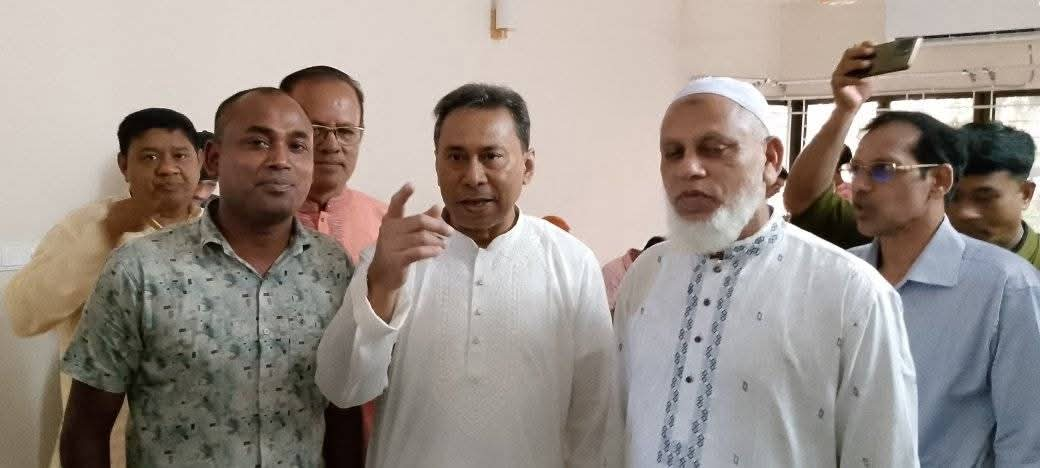
Tuhin at his residence during an exchange of views with leaders and activists. April, 2025

He was sent to jail on 29 April 2025, after his surrender on the same day before two separate Dhaka courts in two cases in which he was sentenced to 21 years in prison.

The High Court has granted bail to him on 8 May 2025, who was convicted in two separate cases filed by the Anti-Corruption Commission (ACC) in 2007 during the time of the caretaker government.
