= Jhunagachh Chapani Union =

Jhunagachh Chapani Union ঝুনাগাছ চাপানী ইউনিয়ন
- Union
- Jhunagachh Chapani Union
- Country: Bangladesh
- Division: Rangpur
- District: Nilphamari
- Upazila: Dimla

Area
  - Total: 14.70 km^{2} (5.68 sq mi)

Population (2011)
  - Total: 34,674
  - Density: 2,359/km^{2} (6,109/sq mi)
- Time zone: UTC+6 (BST)
- Website: jhunagachhchapaniup.nilphamari.gov.bd

Jhunagachh Chapani Union (Bengali: ঝুনাগাছ চাপানী ইউনিয়ন) is a union parishad situated at Dimla Upazila, in Nilphamari District, Rangpur Division of Bangladesh. The union has an area of 14.70 square kilometres (5.68 sq mi) and as of 2001 had a population of 34,674. There are 6 villages and 9 mouzas in the union.
