= Queens University (Bangladesh) =

Private university in Bangladesh

Coordinates: 23.7707°N 90.3588°E

- Seal of the Queens University
- Motto: To Build up Future Career
- Type: Private
- Established: 1996
- Affiliations: University Grants Commission, Bangladesh, IAU
- Chancellor: President Hafiz Uddin Ahmad
- Vice-Chancellor: Abdul Khaleque
- Location: Dhaka, Bangladesh
- Campus: Urban
- Colors: Yellow and White
- Website: queensuniversity.edu.bd

Queens University in short QU (Bengali: কুইন্স বিশ্ববিদ্যালয়) is a private university in Bangladesh. It was established in 1996 under the Private University Act 1992. Hamida Banu Shova is the founder and chairperson of this university. Its campuses are located in Banani and Uttara of the capital. It offers undergraduate and graduate education in several subjects.

== List of vice-chancellors ==
- Abdul Khalek (present)

== Faculty ==
QU organizes its academic programs into different faculties. Each faculty consists of several disciplines which are basically interdisciplinary in character.

Undergraduate courses

- B.Sc. in Computer Science & Engineering (CSE)
- B.Sc. in Textile Engineering (Proposed)
- B.Sc. in Environmental Science and Management (Proposed)
- Bachelor of Business Administration (BBA)
- Bachelor of Laws: LL.B (Hons)
- BA (Hons) in International Relations and Development
- BA (Hons) in English
- BA (Hons) in Bengali (Proposed)
- BA (Hons) in Political Science (Proposed)
- BA (Hons) in Folklore (Proposed)
- BA (Hons) in Sociology (Proposed)

Post-graduate courses

- Master of English (Preliminary and Final)
- Master of Business Administration (MBA-Regular)
- Master of Business Administration (MBA-Executive)
- Master of Laws: LL.M
- Master of Political Science (Proposed)

Queens University Campus, Banani, Dhaka

== Library ==
The QU library houses a comprehensive collection of resources across various fields, including Business, Management, Computer Science, Engineering, Information Technology, Economics, Law, Environmental Studies, English Language and Literature, History, Culture, Psychology, Religion, Sociology, Mathematics, Statistics, and Architecture.

== Extracurricular activities ==
The university offers a range of extracurricular activities for its students, including sports and games, software fairs, seminars, and cultural events.

== Accreditation ==
The academic programs of the university are recognized by many national and international educational institutions and professional bodies such as BCS (Bangladesh Computer Society) and Bangladesh Bar Council.

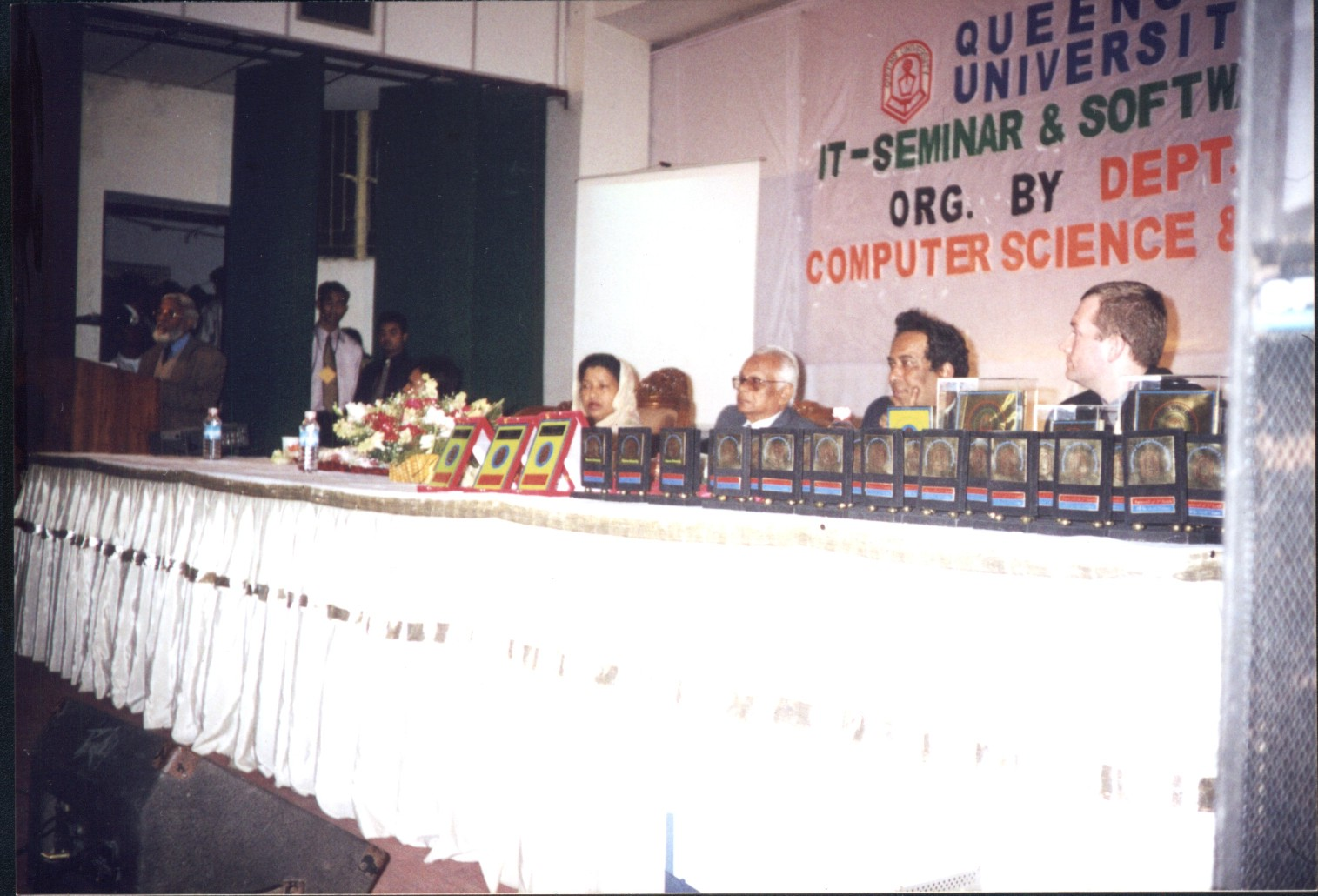
IT- Seminar & Software Exhibition held on 05-02-2002
