= Rangpur-3 =

Constituency of Bangladesh's Jatiya Sangsad

Coordinates: 25.76°N 89.24°E

- Constituency for the Jatiya Sangsad
- District: Rangpur District
- Division: Rangpur Division
- Electorate: 508,223 (2026)

Current constituency
- Created: 1973
- Party: Bangladesh Jamaat-e-Islami
- Member: Md. Mahbubur Rahman
- ← 20 Rangpur-2 22 Rangpur-4 →

Rangpur-3 is a constituency represented in the Jatiya Sangsad (National Parliament) of Bangladesh since 2026 by Md. Mahbubur Rahman of the Bangladesh Jamaat-e-Islami.

== Boundaries ==
The constituency encompasses Rangpur Sadar Upazila, wards 10 through 33 of Rangpur City Corporation and Rangpur Cantonment area.

== History ==
The constituency was created for the first general elections in newly independent Bangladesh, held in 1973.

Ahead of the 2014 general election, the Election Commission reduced the boundaries of the constituency. Previously it had also included eight union parishads of Rangpur Sadar Upazila: Chandanpat, Darshana, Mominpur, Rjendrapur, Sadya Pushkarni, Satgara, Tamphat, and Tapodhan.

Ahead of the 2018 general election, the Election Commission altered the boundaries of the constituency by removing wards 1 through 8 of Rangpur City Corporation, and adding Rangpur Sadar Upazila.

The constituency was one of six chosen by lottery to use electronic voting machines in the 2018 general election.

Ahead of the 2026 general election, the Election Commission altered the boundaries of the constituency by removing ward 9 of Rangpur City Corporation, and adding the Rangpur Cantonment area.

== Members of Parliament ==
Election	Member	Party
1973	Jonab Ali Ukil	Awami League
1979	Kazi Abdul Kuader	Bangladesh Muslim League
Major Boundary Changes
1986	Shafiqul Ghani Swapan	Jatiya Party
1988	Mofazzal Hossain	Jatiya Party
1991	Hussain Muhammad Ershad	Jatiya Party
2001	GM Quader	Islami Jatiya Oikya Front
Apr 2009 by-election	Rowshan Ershad	Jatiya Party (Ershad)
2014	Hussain Muhammad Ershad	Jatiya Party (Ershad)
Oct 2019 by-election	Saad Ershad	Jatiya Party (Ershad)
2024	GM Quader	Jatiya Party (Ershad)
2026	Md. Mahbubur Rahman	Bangladesh Jamaat-e-Islami

== Elections ==
=== Elections in the 2020s ===
General election 2026: Rangpur-3
Party	Candidate	Votes	%	±%
Jamaat	Md. Mahbubur Rahman	178,064		
BNP	Md. Shamsuzzaman Samu	85,498		
JP(E)	GM Quader			
Majority		92,566		
Turnout				
Registered electors		508,223		
Jamaat gain from JP(E)				

=== Elections in the 2010s ===
Hussain Muhammad Ershad died in July 2019. his son Saad Ershad was elected in an October 2019 by-election.

Rangpur-3 by-election 2019
Party	Symbol	Candidate	Votes	%	±pp
JaPa(E)	Plough	Rahgir Al-Mahe Saad Ershad	58,878	62.63	N/A
BNP	Sheaf of paddy	Rita Rahman	16,947	18.03	▼4.95
Independent	Car	Hussain Maqbul Shahriar Asif	14,984	15.94	N/A
Gano Front	Fish	Kazi M. Shahidullah Bayazid	1,662	1.77	N/A
Khelafat Majlish	Wall clock	Md. Tauhidur Rahman Mondal	924	0.98	▲0.79
NPP(S)	Mango	Shafiul Alam	611	0.65	N/A
Valid votes			94,006	100.0	
Invalid votes			0	0.00	
Total votes			94,006	100.0	
Registered voters/turnout			441,224	21.31	▼34.64
Majority			41,931	44.60	+5.72
Jatiya Party (Ershad) hold					

General Election 2018: Rangpur-3
Party	Symbol	Candidate	Votes	%	±pp
JaPa(E)	Plough	Hussain Muhammad Ershad	142,926	61.86	▼6.47
PPB(R)	Sheaf of paddy	Rita Rahman	53,089	22.98	N/A
IAB	Hand fan	Mohammad Amiruzzaman Hossain	23,177	10.03	N/A
SPB(M)	Hoe	Md. Anwar Hossain Bablu	3,214	1.39	N/A
Zaker Party	Rose	Md. Alamgir Hussain Alam	3,085	1.34	N/A
PDP	Tiger	Sabbir Ahmed	2,660	1.15	▼30.52
JaSaD(I)	Torch	Md. Sakhawat Hussain Ranga	1,534	0.66	N/A
NPP(S)	Mango	Md. Shamsul Haque	922	0.40	N/A
Khelafat Majlish	Wall clock	Md. Tauhidur Rahman Mondal	449	0.19	N/A
Valid votes			231,056	100.0	
Invalid votes			0	0.00	
Total votes			231,056	100.0	
Registered voters/turnout			412,990	55.95	▲38.02
Majority			89,837	38.88	+2.21
Jatiya Party (Ershad) hold					

General Election 2014: Rangpur-3
Party	Candidate	Votes	%	±%
JP(E)	Hussain Muhammad Ershad	55,453	68.4	
Jatiya Samajtantrik Dal-JSD	Sabbir Ahmed	25,586	31.6	
Majority		29,867	38.9	
Turnout		81,039	17.8	
JP(E) hold				

=== Elections in the 2000s ===
Hussain Muhammad Ershad stood for three seats in the 2008 general election: Rangpur-3, Kurigram-2, and Dhaka-17. After winning all three, he chose to represent Dhaka-17 and quit the other two, triggering by-elections in them. Rowshan Ershad, his wife, was elected in an April 2009 by-election, defeating BNP candidate Rahim Uddin Bharosha.

General Election 2008: Rangpur-3
Party	Candidate	Votes	%	±%
JP(E)	Hussain Muhammad Ershad	239,046	89.5	N/A
BNP	Md. Abdul Kaium Mondol	19,640	7.3	−3.6
IAB	A. T. M. Golam Mustafa	5,676	2.1	N/A
CPB	Md. Shahadat Hussain	1,602	0.6	N/A
BSD	Abdul Kuddus	693	0.3	N/A
KSJL	Sayed Ali	341	0.1	N/A
Jatiya Samajtantrik Dal-JSD	Md. Sekendar Rahman Dudu	223	0.1	N/A
Majority		219,406	82.1	+45.3
Turnout		267,221	80.1	+7.8
JP(E) gain from IJOF				

General Election 2001: Rangpur-3
Party	Candidate	Votes	%	±%
IJOF	Golam Mohammad Kader	130,562	62.5	N/A
AL	Mustafizur Rahman	53,748	25.7	+7.0
BNP	Habib-un-Nabi Khan	22,756	10.9	+6.9
Independent	Md. Jahangir Hossain	889	0.4	N/A
Bangladesh Samajtantrik Dal (Basad-Khalekuzzaman)	Abdul Kuddus	432	0.2	N/A
JSD	Rafiqul Islam Golap	235	0.1	N/A
Sama-Samaj Gonotantri Party	Md. Abdul Mannan Sarkar	131	0.1	N/A
Independent	Md. Noor Alam	99	0.0	N/A
Majority		76,814	36.8	−14.3
Turnout		208,872	72.3	+3.0
IJOF gain from JP(E)				

=== Elections in the 1990s ===
General Election June 1996: Rangpur-3
Party	Candidate	Votes	%	±%
JP(E)	Hussain Muhammad Ershad	105,590	69.7	+2.4
AL	Md. Siddique Hossain	28,305	18.7	N/A
Jamaat	Mahbubur Rahman Belal	7,890	5.2	+0.6
BNP	Kazi Md. Tareq	6,010	4.0	−0.7
IOJ	Md. Abdur Rahman	1,386	0.9	+0.3
JSD	Md. Shamsul Ajam Khan	1,232	0.8	N/A
Independent	Subrata Ghatak	305	0.2	N/A
Independent	A. K. M. Khairul Anam	198	0.1	N/A
Independent	Mozzammel Hossain	99	0.1	N/A
Independent	Shah Gausul Azam	94	0.1	N/A
Independent	Golam Md. Kader	83	0.1	N/A
Bangladesh Samajtantrik Dal (Mahbub)	Md. Anowar Hossain Bablu	74	0.0	N/A
FP	Md. Faizur Rahman Mithu	67	0.0	N/A
Independent	Moazzem Hossain	57	0.0	N/A
Majority		77,285	51.1	+5.6
Turnout		151,390	69.3	+8.8
JP(E) hold				

General Election 1991: Rangpur-3
Party	Candidate	Votes	%	±%
JP(E)	Hussain Muhammad Ershad	86,114	67.3	
Ganatantri Party	Mohammed Afzal	27,938	21.8	
BNP	Md. Rezaul Haq Sarkar	6,049	4.7	
Jamaat	Md. Nazrul Islam	5,911	4.6	
IOJ	Md. Abdus Salam Sarkar	794	0.6	
Zaker Party	Abu Azgar Ahmed	358	0.3	
NAP (Muzaffar)	Md. Khalilur Rahman	232	0.2	
JSD (S)	Md. Habibur Rahman	226	0.2	
Independent	Md. Siddiq Hussain	164	0.1	
Independent	Zohra Alam	115	0.1	
Independent	Mostafa Zafar Haider	96	0.1	
Majority		58,176	45.5	
Turnout		127,997	60.5	
JP(E) hold				
