= Nautara Union =

Nautara Union নাউতারা ইউনিয়ন
- Union
- Nautara Union
- Location within Bangladesh
- Coordinates: 26.1309°N 88.9777°E
- Country: Bangladesh
- Division: Rangpur
- District: Nilphamari
- Upazila: Dimla

Area
  - Total: 15 km^{2} (5.8 sq mi)

Population (2011)
  - Total: 31,650
  - Density: 2,100/km^{2} (5,500/sq mi)
- Time zone: UTC+6 (BST)
- Website: noutaraup.nilphamari.gov.bd

Nautara Union (Bengali: নাউতারা ইউনিয়ন) is a union parishad situated at Dimla Upazila, in Nilphamari District, Rangpur Division of Bangladesh. The union has an area of 15 square kilometres (5.8 sq mi) and as of 2001 had a population of 31,650. There are 5 villages and 9 mouzas in the union.
