= Mahbubur Rahman (Rangpur politician) =

Bangladeshi politician

Md Mahbubur Rahman
- মো: মাহবুবুর রহমান

Member of Parliament
- Incumbent
- Assumed office 17 February 2026
- Preceded by: GM Quader
- Constituency: Rangpur-3

Personal details
- Born: October 1, 1960 (age 65) Rangpur, East Pakistan
- Party: Bangladesh Jamaat-e-Islami
- Occupation: Politician

Md. Mahbubur Rahman Belal (Bengali: মোঃ মাহবুবুর রহমান বেলাল) is a Bangladeshi politician affiliated with the Bangladesh Jamaat-e-Islami. He is a member of the Jatiya Sangsad, representing the Rangpur-3 constituency.
