= Tepa Kharibari Union =

Tepa Kharibari Union টেপা খড়িবাড়ী ইউনিয়ন
- Union
- Tepa Kharibari Union
- Location in Bangladesh
- Coordinates: 26.1264°N 89.0886°E
- Country: Bangladesh
- Division: Rangpur
- District: Nilphamari
- Upazila: Dimla

Area
  - Total: 9.34 km^{2} (3.61 sq mi)

Population (2022)
  - Total: 20,016
  - Density: 2,140/km^{2} (5,550/sq mi)
- Time zone: UTC+6 (BST)
- Postal code: 5350
- Website: tepakhribariup.nilphamari.gov.bd

Tepa Kharibari Union (টেপা খড়িবাড়ী ইউনিয়ন) is a local government administrative unit and union parishad situated within Dimla Upazila of Nilphamari District, located in the Rangpur Division of northern Bangladesh. Covering an area of 9.34 square kilometres (3.61 sq mi), the union lies directly along the primary basin of the Teesta River.

== History ==
=== Early Administrative Origins ===
The history of Tepa Kharibari is tied to the northern Rangpur floodplains and the historic realm of Cooch Behar. Under Mughal rule, the territory fell within the Sarkar Ghoraghat administrative region. Following the establishment of British colonial administration in Bengal, Dimla Thana was formally organized in 1857 under Rangpur District.

When Nilphamari District was carved out of former Rangpur territories in 1984, Dimla became an upazila, and Tepa Kharibari was established as a union parishad to administer the agrarian settlements and riverine *chars* (silt islands) along the Teesta River.

=== Peasant Movements and Local Resistance ===
During the mid 20th century, the agrarian populace of the region actively participated in the Tebhaga movement (1946–1947). Local tenant farmers (*adhiars*) organized against feudal landholders (*jotdars*) to demand a two-thirds share of harvested crops. Significant clashes occurred across Dimla, leaving a lasting legacy of political consciousness among the farming and fishing communities of Tepa Kharibari.

=== Liberation War of 1971 ===
During the Bangladesh Liberation War in 1971, the northern border zones of Dimla Upazila, including areas surrounding Tepa Kharibari, served as strategic transit routes for Bengali freedom fighters (*Mukti Bahini*) moving across the nearby Indian border. Local residents actively supported guerrilla operations against the occupying forces throughout the nine-month conflict.

=== Hydrological Transformation ===
For generations, Tepa Kharibari operated as a riverine agrarian and fishing hub. Hundreds of traditional fishing families relied on catches from the Teesta River and local wetlands.

However, the construction of upstream water management infrastructure in the late 20th century, including the Gajoldoba Barrage in West Bengal and the downstream Teesta Barrage at Dalia, altered the hydrology of the union. Tepa Kharibari entered an era marked by seasonal extremes: dry winter riverbeds followed by sudden monsoon floods and intense riverbank erosion (*nadi bhangon*).

== Geography and hydrology ==
Tepa Kharibari Union is situated in the northernmost section of Dimla Upazila along the Teesta River. The river enters Bangladesh near northern Dimla and flows directly past Tepa Kharibari before continuing south. Due to its location along the active river channel, portions of the union are frequently subject to seasonal flooding and riverbank erosion.

The geography of the union is dominated by floodplains and dynamic silt landforms known as *chars*. Because the riverbed accumulates large volumes of upstream sediment, the channel shifts during heavy monsoon rain, eroding established banks while creating temporary islands of alluvial soil.

== Administration ==
Tepa Kharibari Union is divided into 9 mouzas and 4 villages. It operates as a local government body under the administration of Dimla Upazila within Nilphamari District.

The four primary villages are:

- Char Kharibari (চর খড়িবাড়ী): Located directly within the active riverbed of the Teesta River, Char Kharibari is an island village highly subject to seasonal flooding and land shifting.
- Purba Kharibari (পূর্ব খড়িবাড়ী): Located on the eastern side of the union, Purba Kharibari functions as the main administrative and commercial center, housing the local union parishad complex and markets.
- Uttar Kharibari (উত্তর খড়িবাড়ী): Positioned along the northern boundary of the union, Uttar Kharibari consists primarily of settled farmland and homesteads.
- Dakshin Kharibari (দক্ষিণ খড়িবাড়ী): Located in the southern sector of the union, Dakshin Kharibari was historically populated by fishing families living near river channels and seasonal water bodies.

== Demographics ==
According to the 2022 Population and Housing Census conducted by the Bangladesh Bureau of Statistics (BBS), Tepa Kharibari Union has a total population of 20,016 living in 4,582 households. The population density is approximately 2,140 per square kilometre (5,500/sq mi).

Muslims constitute the majority of the population, alongside a Hindu minority. The main languages spoken in daily life are the regional Rangpuri dialect and standard Bengali.

== Education ==
Educational opportunities in Tepa Kharibari Union are supported by a network of primary, secondary, and religious learning institutions:

- Secondary Schools: Tapakhari Bari High School (EIIN: 124783), Jatua Khata B.L. High School (EIIN: 124762), and Dakshin Kharibari Junior School.
- Primary Schools: Tepa Kharibari 1 No. Government Primary School, Tepa Kharibari 2 No. Government Primary School, Dakshin Kharibari Government Primary School, and Dakshin Kharibari Colony Para Government Primary School.
- Madrasahs: Dakshin Kharibari Munshi Para Dakhil Madrasah along with several local community and madrasas operating across the four villages.

== Religious institutions ==
Religious life in Tepa Kharibari Union is centered around community places of worship spread across its nine mouzas:

- Mosques: The union contains numerous Friday jame mosques, including the Tepa Kharibari Union Parishad Jame Masjid, Char Kharibari Jame Masjid, and local ward-level mosques that host daily prayers and community gatherings.
- Temples: The Hindu minority maintains several neighborhood mandirs and traditional shrines. Temporary *puja mandaps* are constructed annually for major festivals such as Durga Puja and Kali Puja.

== Economy and healthcare ==
Agriculture forms the economic base of Tepa Kharibari, employing over three-quarters of the active workforce. The alluvial deposit left by seasonal floods supports cash crops such as:

- Maize (Corn): Extensively cultivated across dried char lands as a major commercial crop.
- Paddy Rice: Grown in non-eroded inland fields during the Boro and Aman seasons.
- Secondary Crops: Tobacco, wheat, chili, groundnuts, and seasonal vegetables.

Healthcare services are provided through local community health centers, including the Ektar Bazar Community Clinic. Emergency flood management infrastructure includes multi-purpose flood shelters built to protect displaced families during severe monsoon overflow.

== See also ==
- Unions of Bangladesh
