= Saad Ershad =

Bangladeshi politician

- সাদ এরশাদ
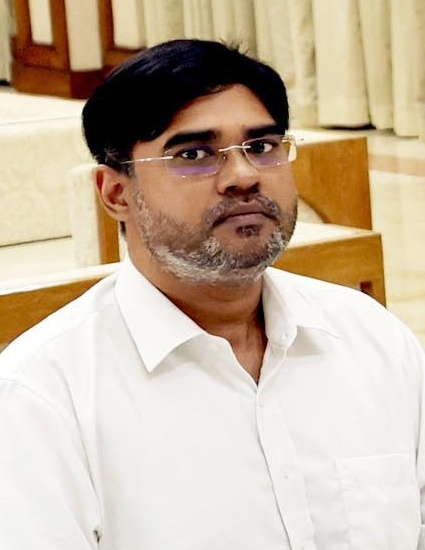
- Ershad in 2022

Member of Parliament
- In office 5 October 2019 – 10 January 2024
- Preceded by: Hussain Muhammad Ershad
- Succeeded by: GM Quader
- Constituency: Rangpur-3

Personal details
- Born: Rahgir Almahe Ershad; 1983 (age 42–43)
- Party: Jatiya Party (Ershad)
- Parents: Hussain Muhammad Ershad (father); Rowshan Ershad (mother)
- Relatives: MH Lalu (uncle); GM Quader (uncle); Sharifa Quader (aunt)

Rahgir Almahe Ershad (Bengali: রাহগীর আলমাহী এরশাদ; born 1983), better known as Saad Ershad, is a Bangladeshi businessman and politician belonging to Jatiya Party. He is the former Jatiya Sangsad member representing the Rangpur-3 constituency. His father Hussain Muhammad Ershad was a former president of Bangladesh and his mother Rowshan Ershad was the leader of the opposition of the Jatiya Sangsad. On 29 October 2019, he was appointed the joint secretary general of the Jatiya Party.

== Early life and family ==
Ershad was born in 1983 to a Bengali Muslim family in Bangladesh with ancestral roots in Dinhata (present-day India). His father, Hussain Muhammad Ershad, was a former president of Bangladesh. His paternal grandfather, Maqbul Hossain, was a lawyer and served as a minister of the erstwhile Maharaja of Cooch Behar.

== Career ==
After the death of his father, Hussain Muhammad Ershad, on 14 July 2019, the Rangpur-3 constituency became vacant. Saad Ershad decided to contest by-poll election. Ershad collected nomination form on 3 September 2019. He was declared as a candidate of Jatiya Party on 8 September. His nomination paper was declared as valid 3 days later by Bangladesh Election Commission. On 16 September, Rezaul Karim Razu of Bangladesh Awami League withdrew his nomination paper and Ershad was declared as the candidate of Grand Alliance in the by-poll. He was elected on 5 October at by-election, defeating his cousin Hossain Mokbul Shahriar.
