= Gayabari Union =

Gayabari Union গয়াবাড়ী ইউনিয়ন
- Union
- Gayabari Union
- Country: Bangladesh
- Division: Rangpur
- District: Nilphamari
- Upazila: Dimla

Area
  - Total: 50 km^{2} (19 sq mi)

Population (2011)
  - Total: 20,835
  - Density: 420/km^{2} (1,100/sq mi)
- Time zone: UTC+6 (BST)
- Website: gayabariup.nilphamari.gov.bd

Gayabari Union (Bengali: গয়াবাড়ী ইউনিয়ন) is a union parishad situated at Dimla Upazila, in Nilphamari District, Rangpur Division of Bangladesh. The union has an area of 50 square kilometres (19 sq mi) and as of 2001 had a population of 20,835. There are 5 villages and 9 mouzas in the union.
