= AR Yusuf =

Bangladeshi politician

- এ আর ইউসুফ

Minister of Civil Aviation and Tourism
- In office 19 January 1985 – 11 October 1985
- Preceded by: AKM Maidul Islam
- Succeeded by: Shafiqul Gani Swapon

Minister of Law
- In office 19 January 1985 – 18 February 1985
- Preceded by: Ataur Rahman Khan
- Succeeded by: A. K. M. Nurul Islam

Personal details
- Born: 1 January 1932
- Died: 11 January 2002 (aged 70)
- Party: Jatiya Party
- Children: 3
- Education: University of Dhaka

AR Yusuf (1 January 1932 – 11 January 2002) was a Bangladeshi barrister and politician. He served as a minister of civil aviation and tourism in 1985.

== Early life and education ==
Yusuf was born on 1 January 1932. He completed his matriculation in 1948. He passed intermediate in 1950. He later obtained a bachelor's degree from Jagannath College. He later got an Master of Arts degree in political science from the University of Dhaka. In 1965, he obtained an Bar at Law degree from the United Kingdom.

== Political life ==
Yusuf was the minister of law, justice and parliamentary affairs of Bangladesh from 19 January 1985 to 18 February 1985. He was the minister of civil aviation and tourism from 19 January 1985 to 11 October 1985.
