= Khoga Kharibari Union =

Union council in Rangpur, Bangladesh

Khoga Kharibari Union খগা খড়িবাড়ী ইউনিয়ন
- Union
- Khoga Kharibari Union
- Country: Bangladesh
- Division: Rangpur
- District: Nilphamari
- Upazila: Dimla

Area
  - Total: 3 km^{2} (1.2 sq mi)

Population (2011)
  - Total: 32,103
  - Density: 11,000/km^{2} (28,000/sq mi)
- Time zone: UTC+6 (BST)
- Website: khogakharibariup.nilphamari.gov.bd

Khoga Kharibari Union (Bengali: খগা খড়িবাড়ী ইউনিয়ন) is a union parishad situated at Dimla Upazila, in Nilphamari District, Rangpur Division of Bangladesh. The union has an area of 3 square kilometres (1.2 sq mi) and as of 2001 had a population of 32,103. There are 4 villages and 4 mouzas in the union.
