= Purba Chhatnay Union =

Purba Chhatnay Union পূর্ব ছাতনাই ইউনিয়ন
- Union
- Purba Chhatnayy Union
- Country: Bangladesh
- Division: Rangpur
- District: Nilphamari
- Upazila: Dimla

Area
  - Total: 45 km^{2} (17 sq mi)

Population (2011)
  - Total: 25,000
  - Density: 560/km^{2} (1,400/sq mi)
- Time zone: UTC+6 (BST)
- Website: purbachhatnayup.nilphamari.gov.bd

Purba Chhatnay Union (Bengali: পূর্ব ছাতনাই ইউনিয়ন) is a union parishad situated at Dimla Upazila, in Nilphamari District, Rangpur Division of Bangladesh. The union has an area of 45 square kilometres (17 sq mi) and as of 2001 had a population of 25,000. There are 4 villages and 9 mouzas in the union.
