= Nilphamari-1 =

Bangladeshi parliamentary constituency

Coordinates: 26.15°N 88.92°E

- Constituency for the Jatiya Sangsad
- District: Nilphamari District
- Division: Rangpur Division
- Electorate: 456,610 (2026)

Current constituency
- Created: 1984
- Party: Bangladesh Jamaat-e-Islami
- Member: Abdus Sattar
- ← 11 Dinajpur-6 13 Nilphamari-2 →

Nilphamari-1 is a constituency represented in the Jatiya Sangsad (National Parliament) of Bangladesh since 2026 by Abdus Sattar of the Bangladesh Jamaat-e-Islami.

== Boundaries ==
The constituency encompasses Dimla and Domar upazilas.

== History ==
The constituency was created in 1984 from the Rangpur-1 constituency when the former Rangpur District was split into five districts: Nilphamari, Lalmonirhat, Rangpur, Kurigram, and Gaibandha.

== Members of Parliament ==
Election	Member	Party
1986 by-election	Mansura Mohiuddin	Jatiya Party
1991	Abdur Rouf	Awami League
Feb 1996	Shahrin Islam Tuhin	Bangladesh Nationalist Party
Jun 1996	NK Alam Chowdhury	Jatiya Party
2001	Hamida Banu Shova	Awami League
2008	Jafar Iqbal Siddiki	Jatiya Party (Ershad)
2014	Aftab Uddin Sarkar	Awami League
2018	Aftab Uddin Sarkar	Awami League
2024	Aftab Uddin Sarkar	Awami League
2026	Abdus Sattar	Bangladesh Jamaat-e-Islami

== Elections ==
=== Elections in the 2020s ===
General Election 2026: Nilphamari-1
Party	Candidate	Votes	%	±%
Jamaat	Md. Abdus Sattar	149,214		
JUI	Monjurul Islam Afendi	118,160		
Majority		31,064		
Turnout				
Registered electors		460,271		
Jamaat gain from AL				

=== Elections in the 2010s ===
General Election 2014: Nilphamari-1
Party	Candidate	Votes	%	±%
AL	Aftab Uddin Sarkar	80,430	82.7	N/A
JP(E)	Jafar Iqbal Siddiki	15,848	16.3	−43.7
JSD	Md. Khoirul Alam	968	1.0	N/A
Majority		64,582	66.4	+22.9
Turnout		97,246	29.2	−60.5
AL gain from JP(E)				

=== Elections in the 2000s ===
General Election 2008: Nilphamari-1
Party	Candidate	Votes	%	±%
JP(E)	Jafar Iqbal Siddiki	179,657	69.5	N/A
BNP	Rafiqul Islam	67,190	26.0	−3.9
NAP	Mohammad Jakaria	5,124	2.0	N/A
BNAP	Shafiqul Ghani Swapan	3,649	1.4	N/A
Gano Forum	Abdur Rouf	1,088	0.4	N/A
BSD	Ashrafuzzaman Laku	791	0.3	N/A
IAB	Abdul Jalil	760	0.3	N/A
KSJL	Syed Elias Ahmed	360	0.1	N/A
Majority		112,467	43.5	+42.8
Turnout		258,619	89.7	+11.8
JP(E) gain from AL				

General Election 2001: Nilphamari-1
Party	Candidate	Votes	%	±%
AL	Hamida Banu Shova	66,871	33.4	+1.6
IJOF	NK Alam Chowdhury	65,552	32.8	N/A
BNP	Shahrin Islam Tuhin	59,805	29.9	+16.2
Independent	Abdur Rouf	5,707	2.9	N/A
WPB	Nur Mohammad Khan	1,743	0.9	−0.2
Independent	Sushanta Misra	309	0.2	N/A
Majority		1,319	0.7	−7.7
Turnout		199,987	77.9	+4.0
AL gain from JP(E)				

=== Elections in the 1990s ===
General Election June 1996: Nilphamari-1
Party	Candidate	Votes	%	±%
JP(E)	NK Alam Chowdhury	60,444	40.1	+8.9
AL	Abdur Rouf	47,833	31.8	+0.1
BNP	Shahrin Islam Tuhin	20,672	13.7	+12.6
Jamaat	Ishak Ali	19,137	12.7	−4.4
WPB	Nur Mohammad Khan	1,634	1.1	−1.7
Independent	Abdul Hai Sarker	523	0.4	N/A
Zaker Party	Md. Golam Azam Khan	315	0.2	−0.1
Majority		12,611	8.4	+7.8
Turnout		150,558	73.9	+12.2
JP(E) gain from AL				

General Election 1991: Nilphamari-1
Party	Candidate	Votes	%	±%
AL	Abdur Rouf	41,218	31.7	
JP(E)	NK Alam Chowdhury	40,492	31.2	
Jamaat	Ishak Ali	22,263	17.1	
Independent	Shafiqul Ghani Swapan	10,159	7.8	
Independent	Hamida Banu Shova	8,306	6.4	
WPB	Md. Moniruzzaman	3,648	2.8	
BNP	Md. Rezaul Basunia	1,386	1.1	
Ganatantri Party	Md. Golam Sarwar	788	0.6	
FP	Md. Nurunnabi Dulal	736	0.6	
Zaker Party	Md. Motowar Rahman	381	0.3	
Jatiya Samajtantrik Dal-JSD	Munir Uddun	300	0.2	
Jatiya Oikkya Front	Abdul Hai Sarkar	259	0.2	
Majority		726	0.6	
Turnout		129,067	61.7	
AL gain from JP(E)				
