= Abdur Rouf (Nilpharmari politician) =

Bangladeshi politician

Member of Bangladesh Parliament
- In office 1991–1996
- Succeeded by: Shahrin Islam Chowdhury Tuhin

Personal details
- Died: 2011
- Party: Bangladesh Awami League

Abdur Rouf was a Bangladesh Awami League politician and a former member of parliament for Nilphamari-1.

== Career ==
Rouf was elected to parliament from Nilphamari-1 as a Bangladesh Awami League candidate in 1991. He served as the whip of parliament. He is a former president of the Bangladesh Chhatra League.

== Death ==
Rouf died on 29 November 2011.
