= Dimla Union =

Dimla Union ডিমলা ইউনিয়ন
- Union
- Location within Bangladesh
- Coordinates: 26.1520°N 88.9214°E
- Country: Bangladesh
- Division: Rangpur
- District: Nilphamari
- Upazila: Dimla

Area
  - Total: 55 km^{2} (21 sq mi)

Population (2011)
  - Total: 44,932
  - Density: 820/km^{2} (2,100/sq mi)
- Time zone: UTC+6 (BST)
- Website: dimlasadarup.nilphamari.gov.bd

Dimla Union (Bengali: ডিমলা ইউনিয়ন) is a union parishad situated at Dimla Upazila, in Nilphamari District, Rangpur Division of Bangladesh. The union has an area of 55 square kilometres (21 sq mi) and as of 2001 had a population of 44,932. There are 10 villages and 9 mouzas in the union.
