= Paschim Chhatnay Union =

Paschim Chhatnai Union পশ্চিম ছাতনাই ইউনিয়ন
- Union
- Paschim Chhatnay Union
- Country: Bangladesh
- Division: Rangpur
- District: Nilphamari
- Upazila: Dimla

Area
  - Total: 9.34 km^{2} (3.61 sq mi)

Population (2011)
  - Total: 25,090
  - Density: 2,690/km^{2} (6,960/sq mi)
- Time zone: UTC+6 (BST)
- Website: paschimchhatnayup.nilphamari.gov.bd

Paschim Chhatnay Union (Bengali: পশ্চিম ছাতনাই ইউনিয়ন) is a union parishad situated at Dimla Upazila, in Nilphamari District, Rangpur Division of Bangladesh. The union has an area of 9.34 square kilometres (3.61 sq mi) and as of 2001 had a population of 25,090. There are 4 villages and 9 mouzas in the union.
