= Abdus Sattar (Nilphamari politician) =

Bangladeshi politician

Member of Parliament
- Incumbent
- Assumed office 17 February 2026
- Preceded by: Aftab Uddin Sarkar
- Constituency: Nilphamari-1

Personal details
- Party: Bangladesh Jamaat-e-Islami
- Occupation: Politician

Md. Abdus Sattar is a Bangladesh Jamaat-e-Islami politician and a member of parliament from Nilphamari-1.
