= Jafar Iqbal Siddiki =

Bangladeshi politician

Member of Bangladesh Parliament

Personal details
- Party: Jatiya Party (Ershad)

Jafar Iqbal Siddiki is a Jatiya Party (Ershad) politician and former member of parliament for Nilphamari-1.

== Career ==
Siddiki was elected to parliament from Nilphamari-1 as a Jatiya Party candidate in 2008.
