= Hussain Muhammad Ershad =

President of Bangladesh from 1983 to 1990

- হুসেইন মুহাম্মদ এরশাদ
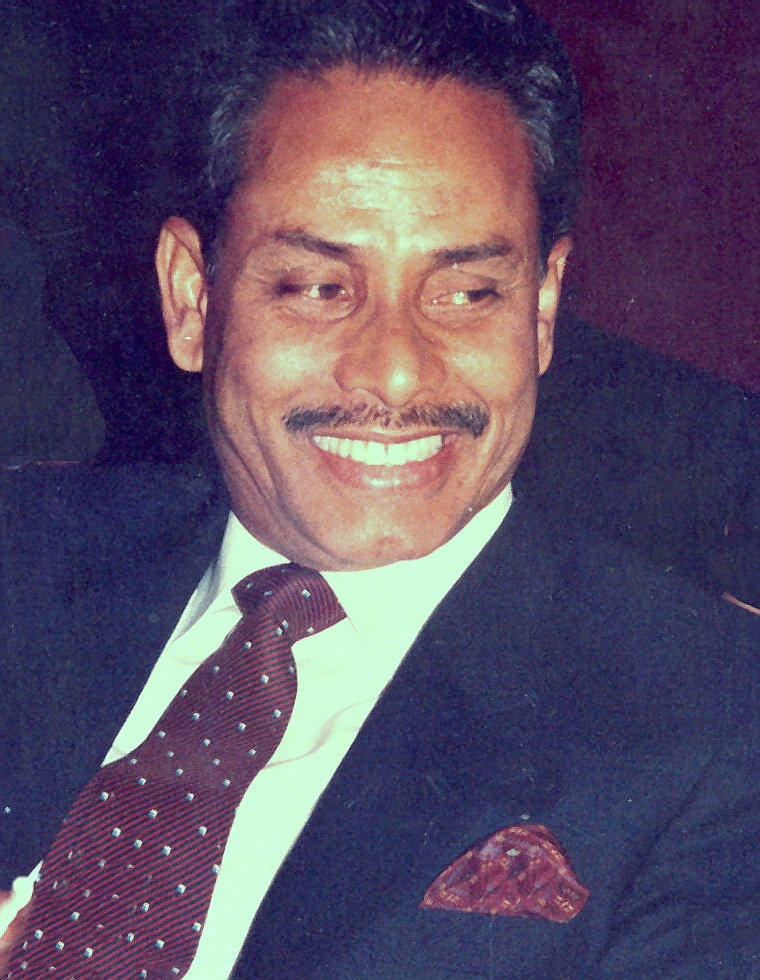
- Ershad in 1986

President of Bangladesh
- In office 11 December 1983 – 6 December 1990
- Prime Minister: Ataur Rahman Khan; Mizanur Rahman Chowdhury; Moudud Ahmed; Kazi Zafar Ahmed
- Vice President: A. K. M. Nurul Islam; Moudud Ahmed
- Preceded by: A. F. M. Ahsanuddin Chowdhury
- Succeeded by: Shahabuddin Ahmed (acting)

1st Chairman of Jatiya Party
- In office 1 January 1986 – 14 July 2019
- President: A. F. M. Ahsanuddin Chowdhury; Himself
- Preceded by: office established
- Succeeded by: GM Quader

4th Chief Martial Law Administrator
- In office 24 March 1982 – 11 November 1986
- Preceded by: Ziaur Rahman
- Succeeded by: Position abolished

5th Leader of the Opposition
- In office 3 January 2019 – 14 July 2019
- Prime Minister: Sheikh Hasina
- Preceded by: Rowshan Ershad
- Succeeded by: Rowshan Ershad

6th Chief of Army Staff
- In office 1 December 1978 – 30 August 1986
- President: Ziaur Rahman; Abdus Sattar; A. F. M. Ahsanuddin Chowdhury; Himself
- Prime Minister: Mashiur Rahman; (acting); Shah Azizur Rahman; Ataur Rahman Khan; Mizanur Rahman Chowdhury
- Deputy: Atiqur Rahman
- Preceded by: Ziaur Rahman
- Succeeded by: Atiqur Rahman

1st Special Envoy of Prime Minister of Bangladesh
- In office 5 January 2014 – 9 December 2018
- Prime Minister: Sheikh Hasina
- Preceded by: Office established
- Succeeded by: Saber Hossain Chowdhury

2nd Deputy Chief of Army Staff
- In office 24 August 1975 – 28 April 1978
- President: Khondaker Mostaq Ahmad Abu Sadat Mohammad Sayem Ziaur Rahman
- Prime Minister: None
- Vice President: Mohammad Mohammadullah; Abdus Sattar
- Chief of Army Staff: Ziaur Rahman; Khaled Mosharraf
- Preceded by: Ziaur Rahman
- Succeeded by: Atiqur Rahman

Personal details
- Born: 1 February 1930 Dinhata, Cooch Behar, British India
- Died: 14 July 2019 (aged 89) Dhaka, Bangladesh
- Party: Jatiya Party (E)
- Spouses: Rowshan Ershad (m. 1956) Bidisha Siddique Ershad (m. 2000; div. 2005)
- Children: 3, including Saad Ershad
- Relatives: GM Quader (brother); Mozammel Hossain Lalu (brother); Merina Rahman (sister)
- Education: University of Dhaka; Officers Training School; Command and Staff College Quetta; National Defence College, India
- Profession: Military officer; politician
- Awards: UN Population Award; UN Environment Award; Global Officials of Dignity Award

Military service
- Allegiance: Pakistan (before 1971); Bangladesh
- Branch: Pakistan Army; Bangladesh Army
- Service years: 1952–1986
- Rank: Lieutenant General; Service number: BA–50
- Unit: East Bengal Regiment
- Commands: CO of 7th East Bengal Regiment; CO of 3rd East Bengal Regiment; Commander of 72nd Independent Infantry Brigade; Adjutant General at Army Headquarters; Deputy Chief of Army Staff; Chief of Army Staff
- Conflicts: Chittagong Hill Tracts conflict

Hussain Muhammad Ershad (Note: Bengali: হুসেইন মুহাম্মদ এরশাদ [ɦusei̯n muɦɑmːɔd̪ eɾʃɑd̪]) (1 February 1930 – 14 July 2019) was a Bangladeshi military officer, dictator and politician who served as President of Bangladesh from 1983 to 1990. (Note: Multiple references:)

He seized power as a result of a bloodless coup against President Abdus Sattar on 24 March 1982 (by imposing martial law and suspending the Constitution). He declared himself president in 1983, and subsequently won the controversial 1986 Bangladeshi presidential election. Despite claims to have legitimately won the 1986 election, many consider his regime as a military regime. (Note: Multiple references:) Ershad founded the Jatiya Party in 1986 and became a Member of Parliament for JP in the constituency of Rangpur-3 in 1991, with successful re-elections in all subsequent general elections. He was the longest serving male head of government in Bangladeshi history.

He contributed to developments in infrastructure and socio-economic growth, divesting key nationalised industries. In 1989, Ershad pushed parliament to make Islam the state religion, in a sharp departure from Bangladesh's original secular constitution. Ershad was forced to resign as president following a popular mass uprising led by Khaleda Zia and Sheikh Hasina.

== Early life and military career ==
Ershad was born in 1930 at Dinhata in Cooch Behar Princely State, British India (now in Cooch Behar district, India) to Mokbul Hossain and Mazida Khatun, in a Bengali Muslim family of Nashya Shaikh origin. Mokbul was a lawyer who served as a minister of the then Maharaja of Cooch Behar and was the son of Wakil Saadatullah. Ershad was the eldest of nine siblings including GM Quader, Mozammel Hossain Lalu and Merina Rahman. His parents migrated from Dinhata to East Bengal in 1948 after the Partition of India. Ershad studied in Carmichael College in Rangpur. He later graduated from the Dhaka University in 1950.

Ershad was commissioned into the Pakistan Army in 1952 from 4th Officers Training School course in Kohat. He was an adjutant in the East Bengal Regimental Centre, the regimental training depot in Chittagong. He completed advanced courses from the Command and Staff College in Quetta in 1966. After serving with a brigade in Sialkot, he was given command of the 3rd East Bengal Regiment in 1969 and the 7th East Bengal Regiment in 1971.

== Bangladesh War of Independence and after ==
From the beginning of the Bangladesh War of Independence, Ershad was interned along with other Bengali officers stationed in West Pakistan and held as a prisoner of war. In 1973, he and the others were repatriated to the new nation of Bangladesh in accordance with the Simla Agreement between India's Indira Gandhi and Pakistan's Zulfikar Ali Bhutto.

After his return, Ershad was appointed as Adjutant General of the Bangladesh Army by President of Bangladesh, Sheikh Mujibur Rahman, the first president of independent Bangladesh. The different experiences during the war of the professional and paramilitary officers and soldiers in Bangladesh, together with the country's diverse cultures, created instabilities in the years after independence. The members of the army who had been imprisoned or otherwise out of the country during the 1971 war later tended to form different political alliances than those who had participated in the war. This long influenced the instability of national politics and the armed forces. Ershad was sent for advanced military courses to the National Defence College (NDC), India.

On 15 August 1975, Sheikh Mujibur Rahman was assassinated. Although Maj. Gen. Ziaur Rahman was arrested in a counter-coup on 3 November 1975, he was restored to power in a coup led by Lt. Colonel Abu Taher on 7 November 1975. The Chief Justice of Bangladesh, Abu Sadat Mohammad Sayem, succeeded to the presidency on 7 November 1975 during martial law. At that time, Ziaur Rahman was appointed as the Deputy Chief Martial Law Administrator. General Ziaur Rahman was appointed Army Chief by President of Bangladesh Khondaker Mostaq Ahmad. Rahman appointed Ershad as the Deputy Chief of Army Staff in 1975. Ziaur Rahman assumed the presidency after legalising the military coups. He revived the multi-party system through the Fifth Amendment of the Bangladesh Constitution. He appointed Ershad as the new Chief of Army Staff, promoting him to the rank of lieutenant general. Viewed as a professional officer and having a talent for Bengali speech writing, Ershad soon became the closest politico-military counsellor of Ziaur Rahman.

== Coup and presidency ==
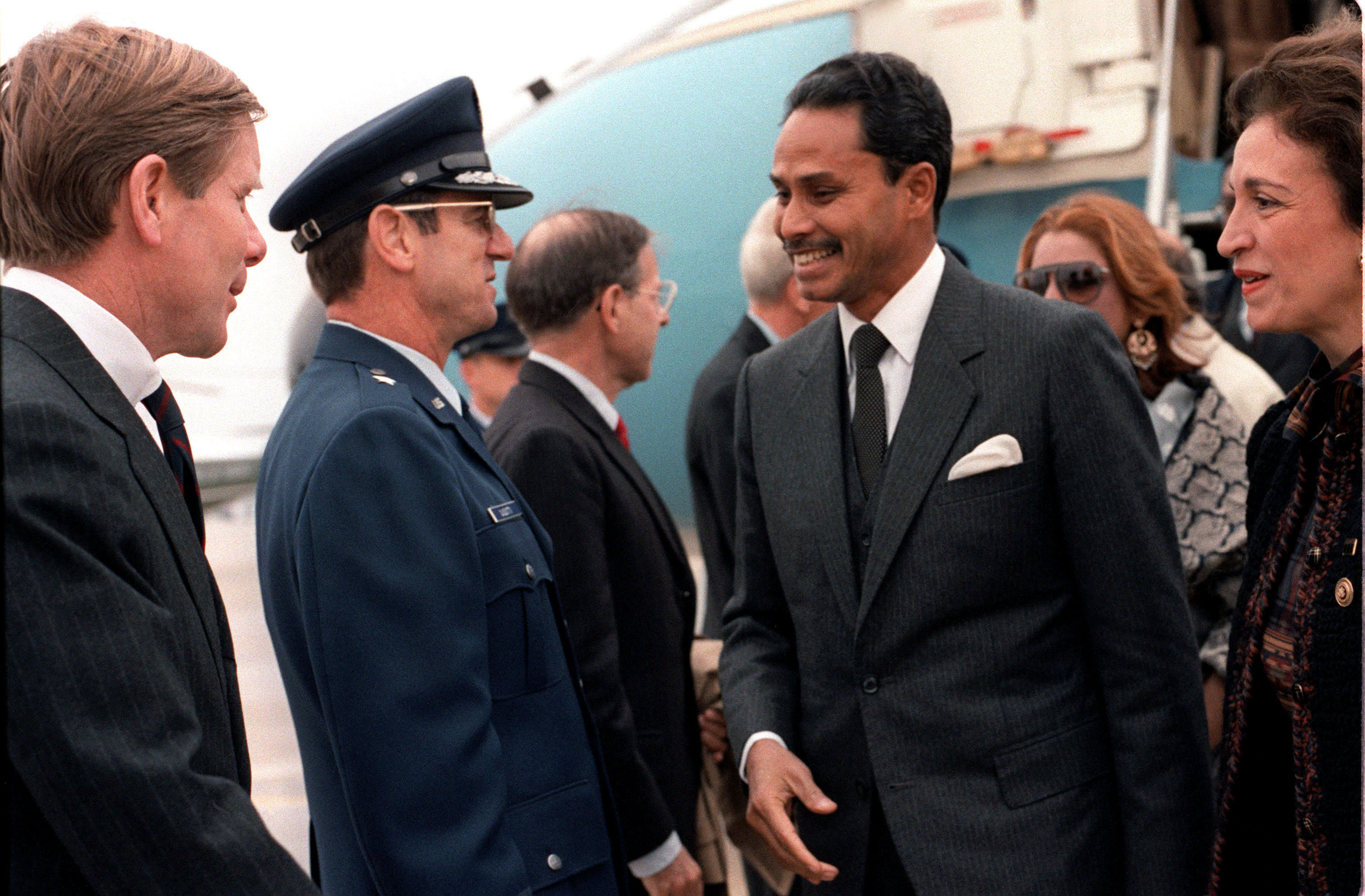
Ershad arrives for a U.S. state visit (1983).

After the assassination of Ziaur Rahman on 30 May 1981, Ershad remained loyal to the government. He ordered the army to suppress the coup attempt by Major General Abul Manzur. Ershad maintained loyalty to the new president Abdus Sattar, who had led the BNP to victory in elections in 1982. Ershad came to power in a bloodless coup on 24 March 1982 as Chief Martial Law Administrator (CMLA). President Abdus Sattar was replaced with A. F. M. Ahsanuddin Chowdhury.

Ershad imitated his predecessor President Zia in many ways. Initially, he too installed a civilian president, Abul Fazal Muhammed Ahsanuddin Chowdhury (March 1982 – December 1983), and became the president only on 11 December 1983. Suspending the constitution and political parties, Ershad took over as president on 11 December 1983 by replacing Chowdhury. Ershad ordered the embassy of the Soviet Union to reduce their staff after the government allegedly saw embassy personnel with anti-government protesters. The police had detained two Soviet diplomats outside of Dhaka in 1982 and Ershad had expressed fear of the Soviet Union.

Ershad supported the Land Reforms Ordinance of 1984, which granted important rights to tenants for the first time in the history of Bangladesh. A plan for the divestment of government industries promised to move the country away from socialism. In January 1985, he dissolved his council of ministers ahead of the general election. Bangladeshi lawyers went on work absentation to call for fair election and removal of Ershad. In March 1985, Ershad reimposed martial law on Bangladesh. Sheikh Hasina and Khaleda Zia were placed under house arrest. He deployed the Army for the referendum seeking approval to stay in power till the next election. In July 1985, he increased the size of his cabinet to 21 ministers which included Kazi Zafar Ahmed and Sirakuul Hossain Khan.

Ershad played a key role during the founding summit of the countries of the South Asian Association for Regional Cooperation (SAARC) in 1985, which was held in Dhaka. Member states of South Asian States agreed to cooperate in politics and economics. Ershad brought together the leaders of India and Pakistan, Rajiv Gandhi and Muhammad Zia-ul-Haq, respectively.

As president, Ershad approved amendments to the constitution of Bangladesh which declared Islam as the state religion, abandoning state secularism, The secular constitution was later restored. to improve rural administration, Ershad introduced the Upazila and Zila Parishad system. He held the 'first democratic elections for these village councils' in 1985.

=== Elections of 1986 and 1988 ===
Presidential Oath Ceremony after 1986 election, with the Chief Justice and long term Military Secretary to the President (1984–1989) Brigadier General ABM Elias

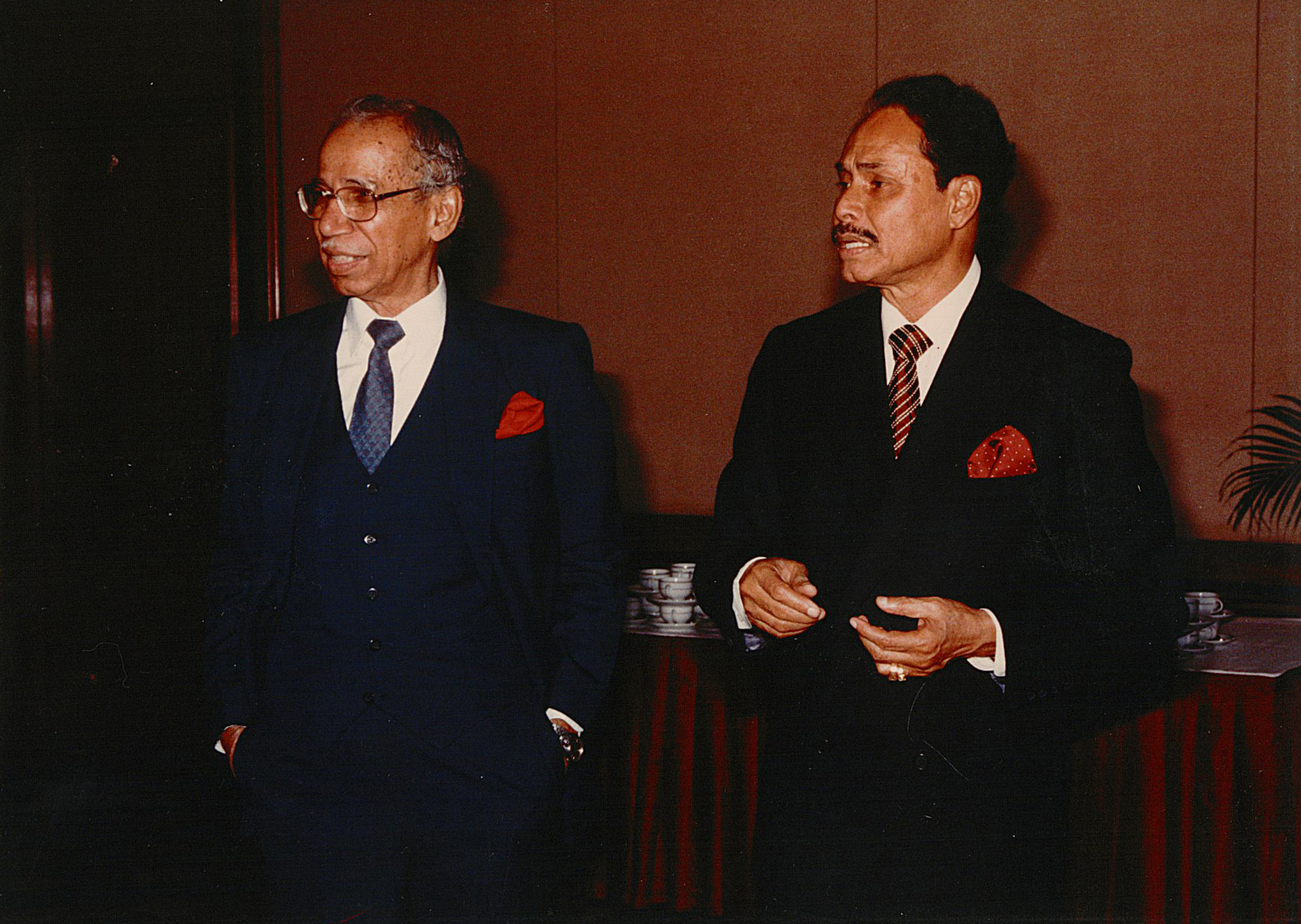
Ershad with a member of Jatiya Party

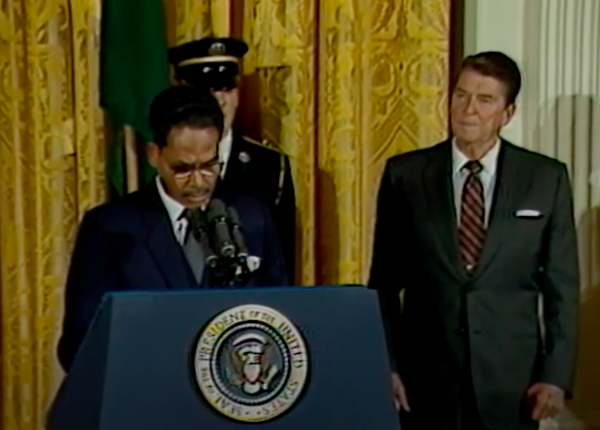
Ershad with President Reagan

Jatiyo Party nominated Ershad in the Presidential Election of 1986, which was organised by his government. The only significant opposition candidates were Hafezzi Huzur and Syed Faruque Rahman, a retired colonel who had been accused in the 15 August Assassination of Sheikh Mujibur Rahman and 3 November jail killing in 1975. (Note: Multiple references:) Parliamentary elections on 7 May 1986, held under the martial law. Main contenders for the parliamentary seats were the Jatiya (People's) Party, formed on 1 January 1986 when the nationwide ban on political activity was lifted, and comprising the five parties which had together formed the pro-government National Front in July 1985 and the opposition leftist Awami League, led by Sheikh Hasina. The largest political party of the second Parliament, BNP decided to boycott the poll. Election day was held in a climate of unrest and was marked by opposition charges of voting fraud and malpractices. On 10 May, polling was suspended in 109 constituencies. Following re-elections in 37 constituencies on 19 May, final results giving JP an absolute parliamentary majority were announced ten days later. Ershad's JP was declared the winner with 153 seats out of 300. There were 115 opposition and 32 independent members. However, the inaugural House session was boycotted by 119 opposition and independent MPs. The same day, a new cabinet was sworn in. Ershad was elected as president on 15 October 1986. The inauguration saw widespread violence and protests against the government.

However, Ershad faced increasing mass demonstrations on the streets mobilised by both the AL led by Sheikh Hasina and the BNP led by Khaleda Zia. The BNP boycotted the 1986 parliamentary election, but the AL which contested in the parliamentary election, later resigned from the parliament. In November 1986, Pope John Paul II visited Bangladesh. Ershad named Justice Minister A. K. M. Nurul Islam as vice-president in December. He replaced Minister of Home Affairs Mahmudal Hasan with M. A. Matin. He dismissed the Deputy Minister for Health and Family Planning and his sister-in-law, Mumta Wahab.

Bangladesh saw violent protests in 1987 calling for the resignation of Ershad. In July, eight people died in 54-hour general strike and hundreds were injured. The protest started against a new law that would allow the military to have role in local development which was opposed by the leader of an opposition party, Sheikh Hasina. In October, security forces detained more than 4,300 opposition activists. In November, Ershad banned marches in Dhaka. On 28 November, he declared a state of emergency which was followed by arrest of opposition leaders including Mirza Golam Hafiz and Zillur Rahman. On 6 December 1987, Ershad dissolved the parliament in the midst of an opposition campaign calling for his and his government's resignation, and a nationwide state of emergency, which had been declared on 27 November. He stated that he wished to pave the way for fresh elections to receive the people's mandate on various national issues. The polling date was originally set for 28 February before being postponed.

In January 1988, the government banned all political rallies. 80 people died in violence related to local council elections in February. The University of Dhaka, which was the centre of opposition against Ershad, saw session jams and decline in academic activities due to the unrest. Polling day was marked by violence and a boycott by the three leading opposition groups − the Awami League (an eight-party alliance) headed by Sheikh Hasina Wazed, the Islamist Jamaat-e-Islami and the right-wing BNP, all of which alleged electoral fraud. In this context, the ruling Jatiya Dal, or Nationalist Party, reportedly increased its parliamentary majority to 251 seats (including 18 unopposed), independents captured 25 seats and several minor parties shared the rest. On 27 March, a new Council of Ministers headed by Ershad was sworn in. The Prime Minister is Moudud Ahmed. In June 1988, Ershad led the parliament in making Islam the State Religion of Bangladesh. He dissolved the Election Reforms Commission after its chairman Justice Badrul Haider Chowdhury criticised the government. Bangladesh saw nationwide floods which killed more than 121 people. More than 680 died in Monsoon floods.

=== Pressure for democracy ===
In January 1990, the government banned protests outside of the parliament. Bangladesh sent two brigades to join the United States led coalition forces in the first Gulf War.

The effective end of the Cold War unleashed democratic forces and dried up international support for military rule in Bangladesh. A wide umbrella of political parties united against Ershad. Khaleda Zia led the BNP, which allied with the Awami League, led by Sheikh Hasina, and Bangladesh Jamaat-e-Islami.

Student activists of various parties united in anti-regime street demonstrations. They were joined by labour unions and government workers. By late November 1990, the uprising shut down government services and paralysed the major cities. In a bid to subdue the opposition, Ershad attempted to declare martial law, but Chief of the Army Staff Lieutenant General Nuruddin Khan refused to support him. Ultimately Ershad was forced to step down on 6 December 1990. Lieutenant General Mohammad Noor Uddin Khan removed officers loyal to Ershad.

Ershad appointed Justice Shahabuddin Ahmed to form an acceptable neutral caretaker government and prepare for democratic elections. Shahabuddin immediately placed Ershad under arrest and detained him, an action declared illegal in 1998 in a case appealed to the nation's Supreme Court.

Although anti-Ershad sentiment was strong, Ershad contested the 1996 election from jail and still won all five different constituencies he had contested from in 1991. The new government led by the BNP's Khaleda Zia instituted a number of corruption charges. Ershad was convicted in two charges till date, while all others were dismissed and thrown out of court.

== Post-presidency political career ==
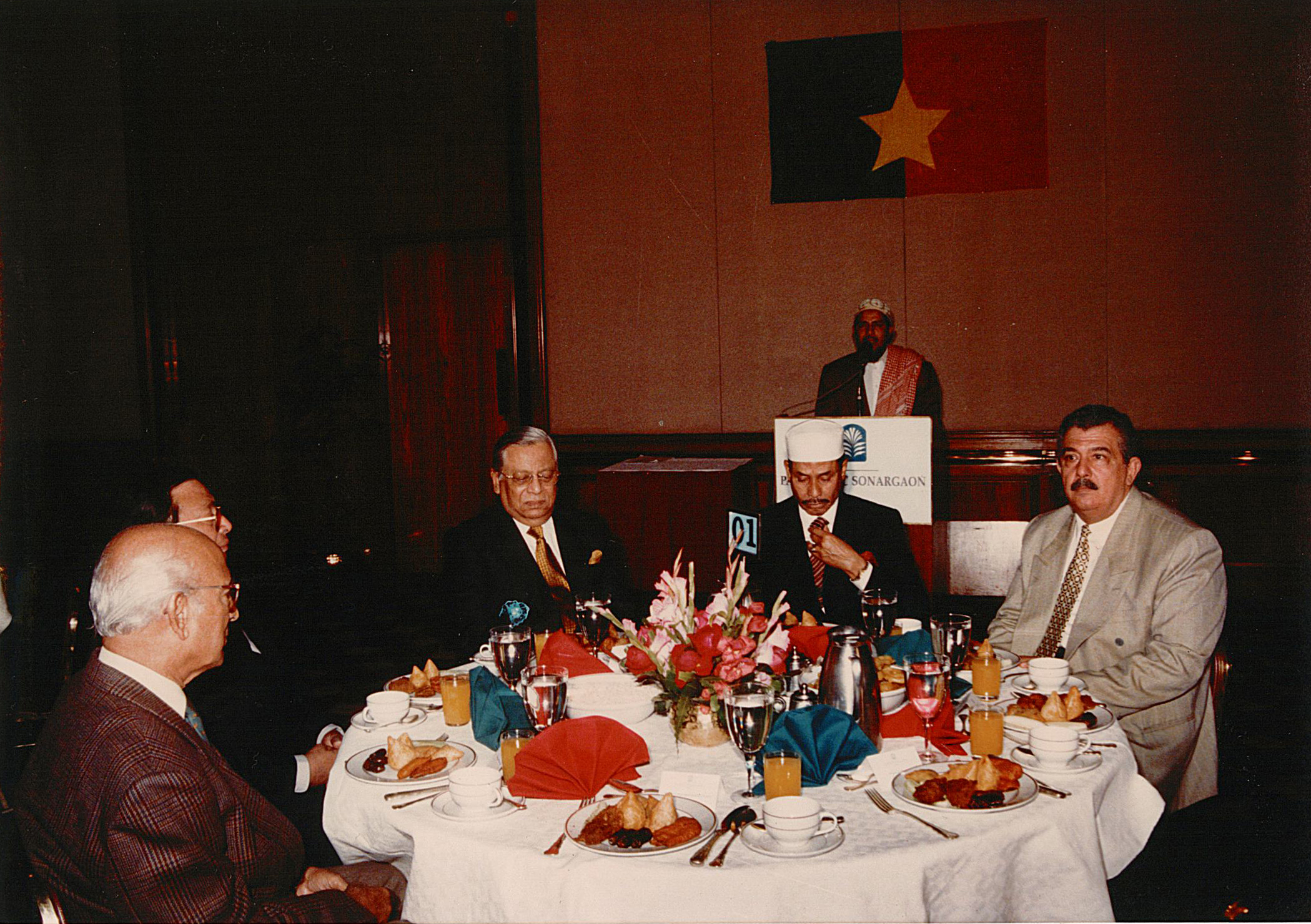
Ershad at an iftar hosted by Jatiya Party for diplomats in Dhaka in 1997. Seated beside him is erstwhile Speaker of the Jatiya Sangsad Humayun Rashid Choudhury.

"[T]he former military ruler, Hussain Muhammad Ershad, is the only high-profile politician to be convicted of corruption and serve a prison sentence. Legal complexities tend to prolong the investigation and settlement of the corruption cases against senior politicians in Bangladesh. 'We really don't know what will be the fate of these cases,' lawyer Shahdeen Malik told the BBC."

Ershad lost his membership in parliament owing to his conviction on charges of corruption when his relations with the ruling Awami League subsequently deteriorated. He switched his support to his one-time political adversary and main opposition leader, Khaleda Zia forming an anti-government coalition. Khaleda Zia of the BNP and Sheikh Hasina of the Awami League allied together to oust Ershad. Ironically both of these two top parties also allied with him and his Jatiya Party in time of their need to suit their purpose.

Ershad called President Iajuddin Ahmed three times along with Kazi Zafar Ahmed twice on 23 December not to extend two days time for filing nominations for scheduled 22 January 2007 elections when Awami League and its allies decided to join that elections after long parley of Mukhlesur Rahman Chowdhury with Sheikh Hasina. However, for the sake of continuation of democratic process Chowdhury convinced all concerned that without both Awami League and BNP the election would not be credible. On 30 June 2007, Ershad stepped down temporarily from the post of Party chairman, indicating an end to his political career. It is speculated that he stepped down under pressure as the Caretaker Government started a series of prosecution and arrest for corruption and criminal charges against political leaders of Awami League and BNP including Sheikh Hasina, Khaleda Zia, and Zia's son Tareq Rahman, among others.

=== Arrest ===
On 1 March 1998, the Supreme Court of Bangladesh ruled that President Ershad's original arrest in 1990 by the caretaker government, led by Justice Shahabuddin Ahmed, was illegal. This ruling would have permitted Ershad to sue the government for wrongful arrest. Ershad was convicted on a separate and unrelated charge eleven years after this arrest.

=== Charges and convictions ===
Ershad has been convicted and served time for only one case that has been upheld by the Supreme Court of the nation – Janata Tower Case. When his relations with the ruling Awami League subsequently deteriorated as he joined hands with the other main opposition BNP of Khaleda Zia.

He was found guilty in the Janata corruption case and was sentenced by the trial court to seven years imprisonment. Later the High Court Division affirmed the conviction but reduced the sentence to five years. The people were charged with building the Janata. It involved two charges – abuse of power in allotting land in Dhaka, which took place after Ershad colluded with M. M. Rahmat Ullah; and possessing unaccounted money. The Justice in his 91-page verdict found Ershad guilty under the Prevention Act.

Ershad was sentenced in corruption case on 20 November 2000. He was released on bail, on 9 April 2001 after serving four months in jail in Dhaka. As a result, he could not contest the 2001 general election.

At the time of his death there were still a few other pending cases against him but most had been thrown out of the court or had cleared him of any wrongdoing. The most famous case that the BNP Government at the time falsely implicated him by was a gold smuggling case. This was later thrown out by a Dhaka Court.

=== Return ===
Ershad at a political campaign in Dhaka, September 2018

In 2006, he protested against the controversial Election Commissioner (CEC) MA Aziz decisions on holding polls.

In 2006, as the BNP's term was ending Ershad joined the party's 4-Party Alliance after meetings with Tarique Rahman and Lutfozzaman Babar, which were followed by meeting with Khaleda Zia at her Mainul Road House. However, in late October 2006, he said he was not in the 4-Party Alliance, reversing his position the following day. Then he went into hiding for 3 days and joined the Awami League's Grand Alliance at Paltan Maidan with Sheikh Hasina.

But Hasina later breached the agreement between the two which promised to make Ershad the president for at least six months. Moeen also committed to make him president before 11 January 2007, but did not. Earlier, Ershad had been offered the position of head of the Government in 1991 by Sheikh Hasina while he was in jail, as well as by Khaleda Zia in 1996 just before the Awami League formed the government after a period of 21 years. Then, Ershad had joined the 4-Party alliance after the 1996 elections, but left later.

On 8 April 2008, Ershad took charge of his Jatiya Party once again. On 19 November 2008, Jatiya Party and Awami League agreed to contest the elections jointly under the Caretaker Government to be held on 29 December 2008. Out of the 300 constituencies in the parliament, Ershad's Jatiya Party contested from 49 (later 42 as Awami League did not pull back its candidates from few seats as agreed earlier) seats and Awami League and members of a leftist Fourteen Party Coalition from the rest 250 seats. At the last minute, Ershad supported the Awami League in the December 2008 election. Thus, the Grand Alliance emerged in Bangladesh.

Ershad contested the Bangladesh Parliamentary Election 2008 from three constituencies. According to Bangladesh electoral laws, a person is allowed to contest from three places, but can retain only one seat and two are to have by-elections after formation of government. These constituencies included Rangpur (Rangpur-3 and Kurigram-2), and Dhaka-17, the capital's diplomatic zone, where he resides. He won all three seats in the election.

The 2014 Election was a controversial election for Jatiya Party where Ershad's spokesperson Bobby Hajjaj had first publicly declared that Jatiya Party would not participate in the election. After the 2014 election, Ershad became the special envoy of Prime Minister Sheikh Hasina in the Awami League-led government. Jatiya Party became the opposition party and Rowshan Ershad, Ershad's wife, became the leader of the opposition. Despite being in the opposition party some leaders of Jatiya Party were also in the government cabinet. In January 2016, Ershad's brother, GM Quader, was made the vice-chairman of the party. In April 2016, Ershad appointed Rowshan as the vice-chairman of the party. In March 2017, Ershad indicated he might form a new political alliance with 14 other parties. For the next general election, the Jatiya Party under Ershad formed a 58 party grand alliance of its own. But of the 58 parties, only the Jatiya Party and Bangladesh Islami Front had registration with the election commission as of 2017.

== Electoral history ==
=== Presidential election ===
Year	Party	Votes	%	Result
1985	Military	32,661,233	94.47	Won
1986	JP(E)	21,795,337	84.10	Won

=== Jatiya Sangsad election ===
Year	Constituency	Party	Votes	%	Result
1991	Rangpur-1	JP(E)	50,004	56.5	Won
1991	Rangpur-2	JP(E)	50,221	45.4	Won
1991	Rangpur-3	JP(E)	86,114	67.3	Won
1991	Rangpur-5	JP(E)	71,132	50.2	Won
1991	Rangpur-6	JP(E)	35,260	38.4	Won
June 1996	Rangpur-2	JP(E)	66,929	47.7	Won
June 1996	Rangpur-3	JP(E)	1,05,590	69.7	Won
June 1996	Rangpur-5	JP(E)	87,387	51.5	Won
June 1996	Rangpur-6	JP(E)	60,665	52.0	Won
June 1996	Kurigram-3	JP(E)	67,262	60.0	Won
2008	Rangpur-3	JP(E)	2,39,046	89.5	Won
2008	Kurigram-2	JP(E)	2,09,505	72.7	Won
2008	Dhaka-17	JP(E)	1,23,936	66.9	Won

== Personal life ==
Ershad married Rowshan Ershad in 1956. The couple had a son and daughter, including Saad Ershad. (Note: Multiple references:)

Rowshan was elected five times as a Jatiya Sangsad member, nominated each time by the Jatiya party. Only in the 2008 election, did Ershad decided to join the Awami League-led alliance and Rowshan went with BNP. After his death, she became the senior co-chairman of the Jatiya party.

Ershad later married Bidisha Siddique in 2000. It ended in a divorce and sedition charges brought by the then BNP government against her in 2005. He divorced her for allegedly hiding her first marriage, which still was not annulled at the time of their marriage. Together they had a son, Eric Ershad. Ershad had adopted a son.

In 1986, The Observer newspaper quoted a woman named Marieum Mumtaz as saying she had secretly married Ershad on 14 August 1982, after he forced her to divorce banker Chowdhury Badruddin. Early in 1990, the story surfaced again in the New York Post and The Sunday Correspondent. In June 1990, she filed a suit against Ershad in the United States, seeking dissolution of marriage. She alleged that he had abandoned her.

In 1990, Dainik Bangla, a government-owned daily, claimed Ershad and Zeenat Mosharraf used to meet at a guest house owned by the Bangladesh Chemical Industries Corporation. Zeenat's husband, A. K. M. Mosharraf Hossain, was the company's chairman until 1988 when he was given a job in Ershad's government as secretary of the Ministry of Industries.

=== Religious views ===
Ershad was a devotee of the Sufi Pir Atroshi and spent considerable time with him during his presidency.

== Death ==
Ershad was admitted to Combined Military Hospital, Dhaka on 26 June 2019 and on 29 June after his condition suddenly deteriorated. He died on 14 July 2019 at the hospital. (Note: Multiple references:) His state funeral took place two days following his death. (Note: Multiple references:)

== Legacy ==
Ershad stabilised the Bangladesh Armed Forces, which had struggled with a series of coups and countercoups since the nation achieved independence in 1971. These arose in part because of the division in the Army between those who had participated in the Bangladesh Liberation War of 1971, and those who had been interned or voluntarily stayed in West Pakistan during the conflict. As those men were repatriated and the Armed Forces needed their participation, they were welcomed back, but complained of discrimination in favour of the freedom fighters. The repatriated officers comprised 60% of the officers and a sizeable interest group. The freedom fighters, part of the development of Bangladesh from the beginning, tended to identify with the Awami League. The repatriated officers tended to identify with the BNP as the opposition. They carried out their rivalries in part through coups.

The Bangladesh Armed Forces did not attempt any coups from Ershad's takeover in 1982 until the fall of the BNP government in 1996. The Awami League in alliance with Jatiya Party won the June 1996 general election.

Ershad approved the participation in 1988 of the Bangladesh Army in United Nations Peacekeeping Operations for the first time. In addition to contributing to multi-national initiatives, this enabled the Armed Forces to earn foreign currency. Their participation in other UN-sponsored actions has continued to contribute to the treasury.

Ershad accelerated the privatisation of state owned enterprises which had begun in 1975 and encouraged private and foreign investment through his 'New Industrial Policy'. The boom in exports in the garment industry also continued under his rule, employing large numbers of women albeit in harsh conditions.

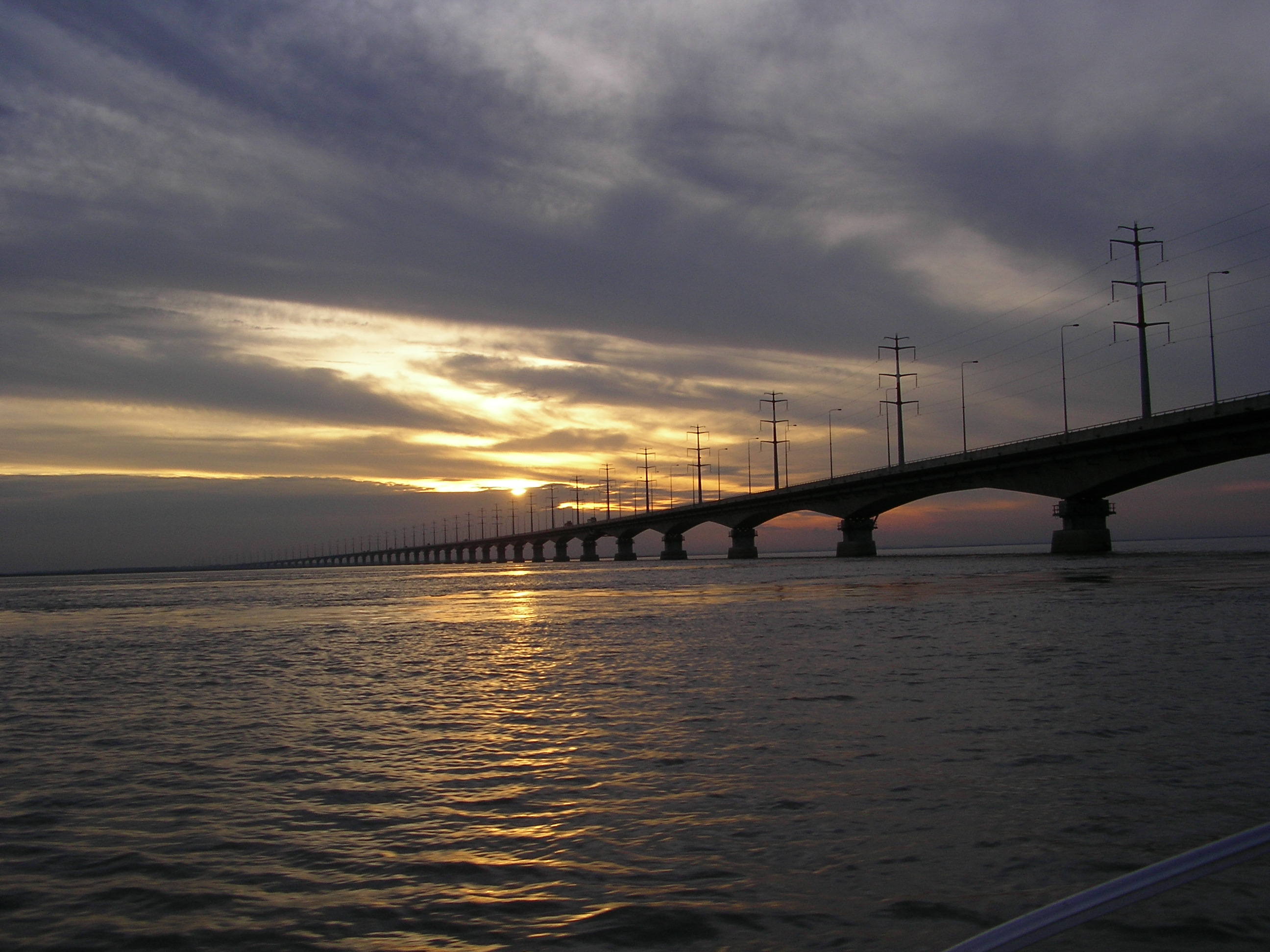
Jamuna Bridge

The Jamuna Multipurpose Bridge Authority (JMBA) was set up by an ordinance promulgated by then President Ershad on 3 July 1985 to implement the project. For mobilisation of domestic resources, another ordinance was promulgated by which a Jamuna Bridge surcharge and levy were introduced. A total of Tk 5.08 billion was mobilised in the process till its abolition.

Ershad was awarded the United Nations Population Award in 1987 for his contributions to population and environmental issues.

On 15 May 2011, Supreme Court declared the military rule of Ershad illegal in a verdict that also said the actions taken by his regime will remain effective until their fate is decided by parliament. "All proclamations, Martial Law Regulations, Martial Law Orders, made/promulgated during the period between 24 March 1982 and the date of commencement of the Constitution (Seventh Amendment) Act, 1986 (Act 1 of 1986) are hereby declared illegal and void....," the SC said in its brief verdict.

== In popular culture ==
- Desh Aaj Bishwabehayar Khappare, sketched by Quamrul Hassan in 1988, depicts Ershad.

Military offices
Preceded by Ziaur Rahman	Chief of the Army Staff; 1978–1986	Succeeded by Atiqur Rahman
Political offices
Preceded by A. F. M. Ahsanuddin Chowdhury	President of Bangladesh; 1983–1990	Succeeded by Shahabuddin Ahmed
Preceded by Rowshan Ershad	Leader of the Opposition; 2019	Vacant Title next held by Rowshan Ershad
Party political offices
New political party	Jatiya Party (Ershad) nominee for President of Bangladesh; 1986	Vacant
