= Dimla Rani Brindarani Govt. High School =

Coordinates: 26.1391°N 88.9269°E

- Dimla RBR School
- Dimla, Nilphamari, Bangladesh; Nilphamari, Bangladesh, 5350; Bangladesh

Information
- Other name: RBR
- School type: Government funded Secondary School, High School
- Motto: Education is light. (শিক্ষাই আলো)
- Founded: 1917
- School board: Board of Intermediate and Secondary Education, Dinajpur
- Principal: Md. Abdur Razzak
- Head teacher: Md. Abdur Razzak
- Faculty: 5
- Grades: 6-10
- Classes: 5
- Language: Bengali
- Hours in school day: 06
- Athletics: Football, cricket, Handball, volleyball, Badminton

Dimla RBR Govt. High School more fully known as Dimla Rani Brinda Rani Government High School is a secondary school located at Dimla Upazila in Nilphamari District, Bangladesh.

The school was established in 1917. Md. Abdur Razzak is currently the head teacher of the school.
