= NK Alam Chowdhury =

Bangladeshi politician

Member of Bangladesh Parliament
- In office 1996–2001
- Preceded by: Shahrin Islam Chowdhury Tuhin
- Succeeded by: Hamida Banu Shova

Personal details
- Party: Jatiya Party (Ershad)

NK Alam Chowdhury is a Jatiya Party (Ershad) politician and a former member of parliament for Nilphamari-1.

== Career ==
Chowdhury was elected to parliament from Nilphamari-1 as a Jatiya Party candidate in 1996.
