= Jamuna Television =

Bangladeshi TV channel

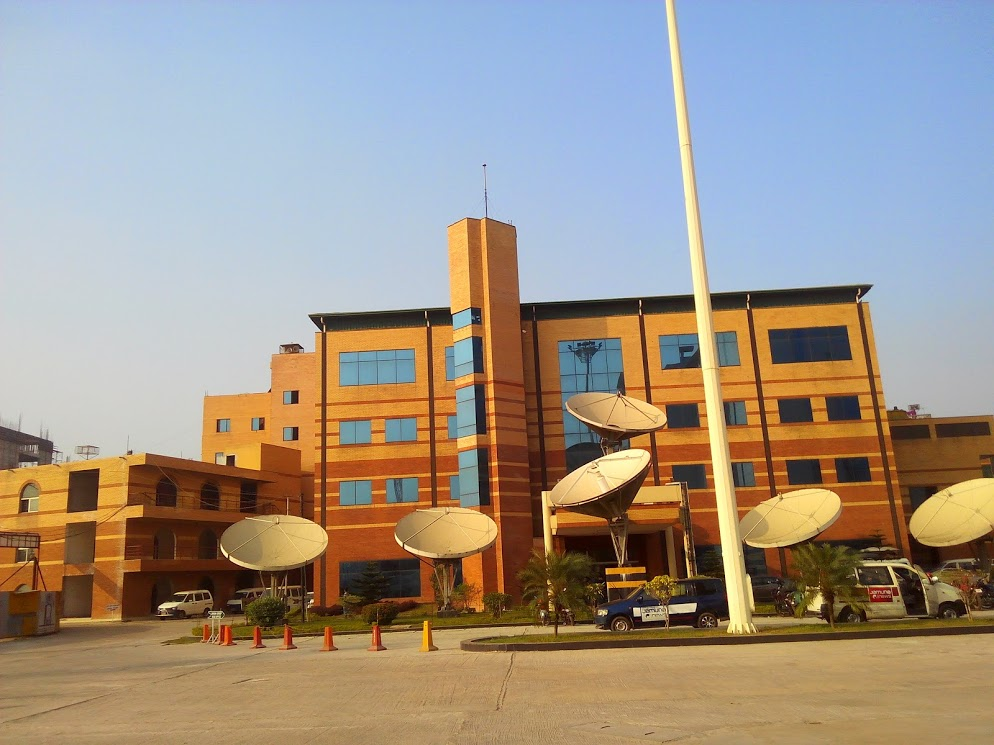
- The headquarters of Jamuna Television in Baridhara
- Country: Bangladesh
- Broadcast area: Nationwide
- Headquarters: Jamuna Future Park Complex, Pragati Sarani, Baridhara, Dhaka

Programming
- Picture format: 16:9 SDTV

Ownership
- Owner: Jamuna Group
- Key people: Fahim Ahmed (CEO)

History
- Launched: 5 April 2014; 12 years ago

Links
- Website: www.jamuna.tv

Jamuna TV

YouTube information
- Channel: Jamuna TV
- Years active: 2017–present
- Genre: News (in Bengali)
- Subscribers: 30.0 million
- Views: 27.07 billion
- Last updated: 11 February 2026

Jamuna Television (Bengali: যমুনা টেলিভিশন; in reference to the Jamuna river), commonly known as Jamuna TV, stylized as ᴊamuna|tv, is a privately owned Bangladeshi satellite and cable news and current affairs television channel. It is owned by the Jamuna Group, and was founded by the company's founder and former chairman Nurul Islam Babul in 2014. The channel's headquarters are located in the Jamuna Future Park Complex at Pragati Sarani in Baridhara. The official YouTube channel of Jamuna Television is the most subscribed one from Bangladesh as of 2023.

== History ==
In 2002, Jamuna Television was granted an NOC certificate to broadcast for five years. They were given rights to broadcast both on terrestrial and satellite television. In 2005, without explanation, the BNP-led government revoked its broadcasting rights, but after the High Court permitted Jamuna Television to broadcast, the government appealed against the decision.

Although its certificate had expired by then, the original channel began test broadcasting on 15 October 2009. The BTRC shut the channel down on 19 November after the channel had allegedly been broadcasting illegally. In 2010, the High Court ruled that the government order to stop broadcasting of Jamuna TV was valid. On 29 July 2013, the channel was once again granted a license to relaunch. Jamuna Television was officially launched on 5 April 2014. British foreign correspondent Simon Dring, who was previously the managing director of Ekushey Television, joined the channel as a staff member.

Jamuna Television was one of the nine Bangladeshi television channels to sign an agreement with Bdnews24.com to subscribe to a video-based news agency run by children called Prism in May 2016. In December 2018, journalists working for Jamuna Television and Jugantor were attacked in Nawabganj Upazila of Dhaka, injuring 10 people. Jamuna Television was temporarily taken off-air during the 2018 Bangladeshi general election.

In January 2019, three journalists working for Jamuna Television were assaulted by eight to ten people in a rehabilitation center in Bogra. Police arrested three suspects allegedly involved in the incident. On 19 May 2019, Jamuna Television, along with five other channels, began broadcasting via the Bangladesh-1 satellite after signing an agreement with BSCL. On 5 March 2022, Fahim Ahmed was appointed as the CEO of Jamuna Television.

== Controversies ==
In June 2015, a program called Investigation 360 was accused of defaming the then environment minister, Hasan Mahmud, for airing a report related to Climate Fund. A defamation case was filed against the mass media under sections 501 and 502 for the investigative report that 35 crore taka was spent on the construction of the Sheikh Russell Aviary Park in Rangunia from the Climate Fund.

On 19 October 2015, telecommunications company Grameenphone filed a defamation case against Jamuna Television and Jugantor for publishing 'fake' news against the company. On 6 November 2016, Jamuna TV's senior reporter Shakil Hasan and video journalist Shaheen Alam were attacked while reporting on an illegal polythene bag manufacturing factory at Devidas Lane in Chawkbazar, Dhaka. An attempt was made to set the journalist on fire by pouring kerosene on him. In 2018, another defamation case was filed against Jamuna and Jugantor by the conglomerate PRAN-RFL Group. They were also sued by Robi and the National Board of Revenue earlier.

Jamuna Television was one of the Bangladeshi channels whose YouTube channels were geo-blocked in India on 9 May 2025, citing threat to national security concerns during the 2025 India–Pakistan conflict.

== See also ==
- List of television stations in Bangladesh
- Telecommunications in Bangladesh
- Media of Bangladesh
- List of newspapers in Bangladesh
