= Farid Ahmed (judge) =

Bangladeshi judge

Justice of the High Court Division of Bangladesh
- Incumbent
- Assumed office 17 October 1985

Personal details
- Born: January 1, 1960 (age 66)
- Education: University of Dhaka
- Profession: Judge

Farid Ahmed is a judge of the High Court Division of Bangladesh Supreme Court.

== Early life ==
Ahmed was born on 1 January 1960. He completed a Bachelor of Arts and a law degree from the University of Dhaka.

== Career ==
Ahmed joined the district court as a lawyer on 17 October 1985.

On 6 October 1988, Ahmed became a lawyer of the High Court Division of Bangladesh Supreme Court.

On 8 November 2006, Ahmed was made a lawyer of the Appellate Division of Bangladesh Supreme Court.

Ahmed was appointed an additional judge of the High Court Division of Bangladesh Supreme Court 4 November 2010.

Ahmed and Justice M Shawkat Hossain stopping the proceedings of corruption cases, filed during the 2006-2008 caretaker government term, against Nurul Islam Babul, chairperson of Jamuna Group, and his wife Salma Islam.

On 14 February 2012, Ahmed and Justice Sheikh Hassan Arif issued a verdict in favor of Grameenphone against fees claimed by Bangladesh Telecommunication Regulatory Commission. Ahmed was appointed a permanent judge of the High Court Division of Bangladesh Supreme Court 15 October 2012.

Ahmed and Justice Mohammad Ullah on 23 July 2015 issued a verdict denying bail to British-Bangladesh ISIS member who fought for the terrorist group in Syria and returned to Bangladesh to recruit.

Ahmed and Justice Mohi Uddin Shamim in October 2021 denied bail to Mohammad Shahed, chairman of Regent Hospital, on fraud charges. In September, he was part of the Bangladesh Supreme Court delegation to the Bangabhaban which went to submit the Annual Report-2020 of Supreme Court to President Abdul Hamid.
