= National Housing Finance and Investments Limited =

Non-bank financial institution

- Type: Public company
- Traded as: DSE: NHFL
- Industry: Financial services
- Headquarters: Dhaka, Bangladesh
- Website: www.nationalhousingbd.com

National Housing Finance and Investments Limited is a major non-bank financial institution in Bangladesh providing leasing and investment services. It is listed on the Dhaka Stock Exchange. Mahbubur Rahman is the chairman, and Khalilur Rahman is the managing director of National Housing Finance and Investments Limited.

== History ==
National Housing Finance and Investments Limited was established in August 1998 under the Companies Act, 1994. It and International Leasing and Financial Services Limited were founded by Rezaur Rahman (son of A. F. Mujibur Rahman) with funds from Shaw Wallace Bangladesh Limited and Mohammed Matiul Islam, former Finance Secretary of Bangladesh. A major shareholder of the institution is Transcom Group, founded by Latifur Rahman. The shares are held by Bangladesh Lamps Limited, Borak Travels, Eastland Insurance, Eastern Insurance Company Limited, HRC Group, IFIC Bank, Jiban Bima Corporation, National Bank Limited, National Life Insurance Company Limited, Pragati Insurance Limited, Reliance Insurance Limited, Sadharan Bima Corporation, Shaw Wallace Bangladesh, Square Pharmaceuticals Limited, and United Commercial Bank, and Unicorn Equities Ltd.

In 2004, National Housing Finance and Investments Limited declared a nine percent dividend under chairman M Haider Chowdhury. In 2006, M Haider Chowdhury was re-elected chairman of the National Housing Finance and Investments Limited.

In August 2007, Bangladesh Bank ordered the National Housing Finance and Investments Limited to offload shares through an initial public offering. National Housing Finance and Investments Limited signed an agreement with ERA InfoTech Limited to acquire core software in 2018.

In September 2022, the National Housing Finance and Investments Limited signed an agreement with Bangladesh Bank to provide refinancing. HRC Group sold 2 million shares of the National Housing Finance and Investments Limited through the Dhaka Stock Exchange. In 2023, it was awarded by the Institute of Chartered Secretaries of Bangladesh for good governance.

== Board of directors ==
Board Members
Name	Position	Reference
Mahbubur Rahman	Chairman	
Khondaker Showkat Hossain	Director	
Md. Kabir Reza	Director	
A.K.M. Moinuddin	Director	
Mohammad Khaled Mamun	Director	
Abdul Muyeed Chowdhury	Independent Director	
Mohammad Shamsul Islam	Managing Director	
