= M. Nurul Huda =

M. Nurul Huda is a former secretary and former Chairman of the Rajdhani Unnayan Kartripakkha (RAJUK).

== Early life ==
Huda completed his bachelor's in civil engineering at Bangladesh University of Engineering and Technology in 1974.

== Career ==
Huda joined Roads and Highways Department as an assistant engineer in 1975. He was the project director of Buriganga Bridge, Balu River Bridge, Jhilmil Residential Area, Uttara Model Town (third phrase), Purbachal 300 feet road project, and Dhaka Detail Area Plan. The Commission recommended filling case against him and secretary Khondaker Showkat Hossain. He served as the chairman of Institution of Engineers, Bangladesh in Dhaka.

In 2009, Huda was appointed chairman of the Rajdhani Unnayan Kartripakkha (RAJUK). He oversaw the construction of Hatirjheel and Kuril Flyover. He worked as an engineer for the Public Works Department. He terminated a contract of Ena Properties, owned by Awami League member of parliament M Enamul Haque.

In April 2014, Huda retired as the chairman of RAJUK. He had denied corruption allegations against him and while the Anti-Corruption Commission director of investigation M Shahabuddin denied the existence of any formal investigation against Huda. The Commission questioned him and Minister Abdul Mannan Khan. GM Jainul Abedin Bhuiyan replaced Huda as the chairman of Rajdhani Unnayan Kartripakkha.

The Anti-Corruption Commission began an investigation into Huda in March 2015 over his wealth and registration of two plots in Purbachal for him and his wife. Nasir Khan had complained that Huda had demanded 20 million BDT from him. He also ignored Prime Minister Sheikh Hasina's instruction to allocate land to independent working women and cancelled allocations from 1999 to 2005. The commission cleared him in 2016 after his wife surrendered her allocated plot.

Huda is the chairperson of Delight Engineers and Consultants Limited. He is the advisor of S. S. International Trading.
