= Salman F Rahman =

Former member of Jatiya Sangsad

Salman Fazlur Rahman
- সালমান এফ রহমান
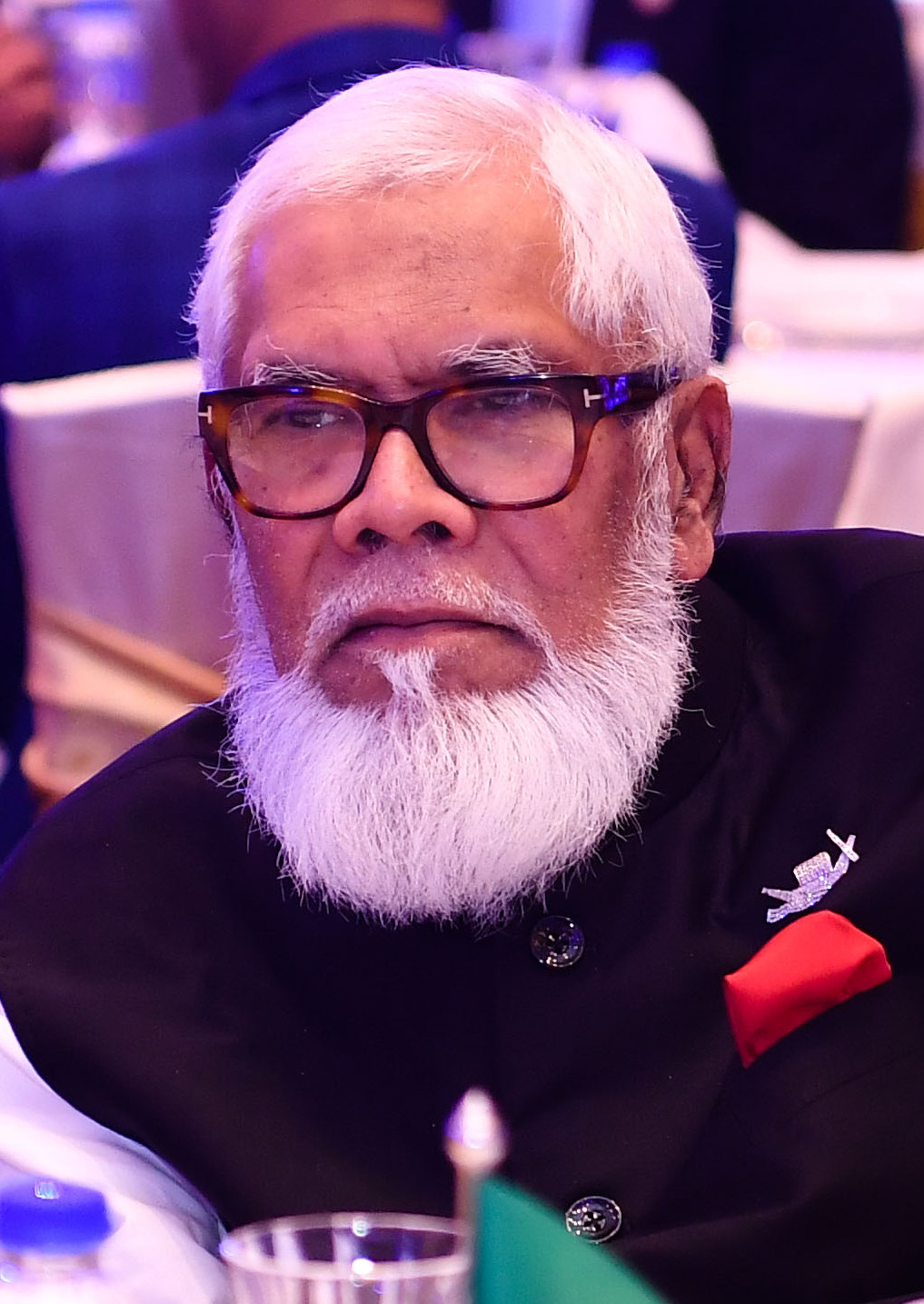
- Rahman in 2023

Member of the Bangladesh Parliament for Dhaka-1
- In office 3 January 2019 – 5 August 2024
- Preceded by: Salma Islam
- Succeeded by: Khondoker Abu Ashfaque

Personal details
- Born: 23 May 1951 (age 75) Dohar, Dhaka, East Bengal, Pakistan
- Party: Awami League
- Spouse: Syeda Rubaba Rahman
- Relations: Ahmed Sohail Fasihur Rahman (brother); Nazmul Huda (nephew); Mainur Reza Chowdhury (cousin); Salahuddin Quader Chowdhury (cousin)
- Children: Shayan Fazlur Rahman
- Parent: Fazlur Rahman (father)
- Education: University of Dhaka; University of Karachi
- Occupation: Vice Chairman of Beximco Group

Salman Fazlur Rahman (born 23 May 1951), commonly known as Salman F Rahman, is a Bangladeshi business magnate and a former politician who is currently incarcerated. He is the vice chairman of BEXIMCO Group, one of Bangladesh's largest industrial conglomerates. He previously served as a Member of Parliament for the Dhaka-1 constituency and was the private industry and investment adviser to Prime Minister Sheikh Hasina, holding the rank of a cabinet minister. Rahman's political career ended abruptly following the July Uprising, which led to the resignation of Sheikh Hasina's government on August 5, 2024. He was arrested on August 13, 2024, while allegedly attempting to flee the country. He faces numerous charges across multiple cases, including incitement to murder during the protests, corruption, and large-scale financial embezzlement. The Anti-Corruption Commission (ACC) has also filed separate cases against him related to money laundering and loan defaults. As of July 2025, he remains in jail with all bail petitions denied by the courts.

In 2017, he was ranked as the 1685th-wealthiest billionaire (in U.S.-dollar terms) by Hurun Global. He holds the position of vice chairman at BEXIMCO Group, one of Bangladesh's largest conglomerates. He was the president of several trade bodies, including the Association of Television Channel Owners (ATCO).

Salman has been involved in financial controversies related to bank loans and the capital market. He is currently incarcerated by the Dhaka Metropolitan Police on the charges of instigating killing during the July Uprising.

== Early life ==
Salman was born into a Bengali Muslim family in Shinepukur, Dohar, Dhaka District, on 23 May 1951. His parents were Fazlur Rahman, a state minister in Pakistan and Syeda Fatina Rahman. Syeda Fatina was a descendant of Syed Nasiruddin and the Dewan family of Haibatnagar on her father's side, and of Nawab Syed Muhammad Azad and Nawab Abdul Latif on her mother's. Salman has a brother, Ahmed Sohail Fasihur Rahman.

Salman successfully completed his Higher Secondary Examination from Notre Dame College in Dhaka and gained admission into the Physics Department of the University of Dhaka in 1968. Later, he graduated from Karachi University.

== Career ==
In 1966, Rahman and his elder brother, Sohail, began managing a family-owned jute factory. However, in 1972, the government nationalized the factory. The same year, they founded the Bangladesh Export and Import Company Limited (BEXIMCO Group) and initiated the export of seafood and crushed bones to European countries, importing medicines in return. BEXIMCO Group has grown to become one of Bangladesh's premier conglomerates, with subsidiaries such as BexTex, Beximco Pharmaceuticals Ltd. (Beximco Pharma), and Shinepukur Ceramics. With a global workforce exceeding 70,000 people, BEXIMCO is the largest private sector employer in Bangladesh.

In 1976, the two brothers established Beximco Pharmaceuticals Ltd. (Beximco Pharma). Later on, this company was listed as the first Bangladeshi company at London's Alternative Investment Market. The company is listed in Aim of London Stock Exchange and also accredited by many foreign regulatory authorities, including the US FDA, for its export operations. In addition, it is the first Bangladeshi company to export medicines to Canada.

In 1982, the brothers partnered with the Dubai-based Galadari Brothers Group to establish the country's first private bank, the AB Bank. In 1985, Rahman sold his stake to other partners. Subsequently, the brothers bought a 30% stake in IFIC Bank. Fazlur Rahman became chairman of the bank in 2010 and was re-elected in 2016.

In 2021, BEXIMCO launched a BDT 3,000 crore Sukuk bond.

Rahman owns the Bangla news channel Independent Television. He previously owned the English daily, The Independent, which was launched on 26 March 1995 and ceased publication on 31 January 2022. During its operation, he served as the chairman of the board of editors.

== Politics ==
Rahman entered politics in the mid-1990s and founded a political party under the banner Samriddhya Bangladesh Andolan. Later, he joined the Bangladesh Awami League. He was their nominee for constituency Dhaka-1 (Dohar Upazila) in the Bangladeshi general election in 2001.

Rahman was the private sector development adviser to Prime Minister Sheikh Hasina.

Rahman contested from Dhaka-1 constituency (Dohar and Nawabganj upazilas) in the 2018 parliamentary election and received 3,04,797 votes, while the nearest rival Salma Islam received 38,017 votes. He contested the election with the Awami League's symbol boat and secured 86.5% of the votes of the constituency.

Rahman got 1,49,971 votes under the Dhaka-1 constituency in the controversial January 2024 general election. His closest competitor, Salma Islam from the Jatiyo Party, trailed behind with 34,746 votes.

== Role as prime minister's advisor ==
Rahman was appointed as the Private Industry and Investment Advisor to Prime Minister Sheikh Hasina on 15 January 2019. Without any financial incentives, the post retains the rank of a minister. Rahman was tasked by the prime minister to improve Bangladesh's standing on the World Bank's Ease of Doing Business index. Rahman's initiatives led the country to climb seven places up in 2020. Additionally, he spearheaded efforts to implement projects under the public–private partnership (PPP) method through a fast-track program.

=== Foreign direct investment ===
As the prime minister's adviser, Rahman from 2020 to 2022 helped the government agencies organize investment roadshows in the UAE, UK, and US, to increase the foreign direct investment inflow. He participated in programs home and abroad, and urged non-resident Bangladeshis to invest in the country's agriculture, healthcare and education sectors since the private sector is 90% of the total business in Bangladesh.

During NRB Professional Summit 2022, Rahman asked non-resident Bangladeshis to invest in the country's agriculture, healthcare and education sectors.

In 2022, after a meeting with Rahman, the United Kingdom's investment minister Lord Dominic Johnson expressed that British companies will be interested to explore the recycling industry of Bangladesh's ready-made garment sector.

In November 2022, Rahman participated in Investment Flash Mob in Tokyo, Japan and urged Japanese businessmen to assist Bangladesh in intellectual infrastructure. He also met Singapore's Transport and Commerce Minister S Eswaran and discussed signing of a free trade agreement between Bangladesh and Singapore.

Rahman attended Bangladesh-UAE Economic Cooperation seminar held in Abu Dhabi in September 2022 to promote trade and business opportunities of the country. He mentioned in his speech that he is now of the 'Asia's economic powerhouse'.

=== Foreign relations ===
In December 2022, Rahman had a meeting with Pranay Kumar Verma, the High Commissioner of India to Bangladesh. During their discussion they explored the possibility of signing a comprehensive economic partnership agreement.

== Board memberships and affiliations ==
Rahman is the vice-chairman of BEXIMCO Group. He headed the Federation of Bangladesh Chambers of Commerce & Industries (FBCCI) from 1994 to 1996. He was a director of the Bangladesh Securities and Exchange Commission and Dhaka Stock Exchange. He is a former president of Association of Television Channel Owners (ATCO) and LPG Operators Association of Bangladesh (LOAB). He is currently the chairman of the board of governors of Bangladesh Enterprise Institute and the sporting club Abahani Limited Dhaka.

== Personal life ==
Salman F Rahman is married to Syeda Rubaba Rahman, and they have a son, Shayan Fazlur Rahman. Shayan, once the vice-chairman of IFIC Bank, lost his directorial position in August 2024. Bangladesh Financial Intelligence Unit (BFIU) also froze the bank accounts of Salman, Shayan, and Shayan's wife, Shazreh Rahman.

== Controversies ==
In 2007, a leaked diplomatic cable from the United States Ambassador to Bangladesh alleged that Rahman was one of the largest bank loan defaulters in Bangladesh.

On 4 February 2007, Rahman was arrested on charges of crime and corruption in 11 cases during the 2006-2008 Bangladeshi political crisis. On 20 August 2008, the High Court of Bangladesh granted him bail in a bank forgery case.

During the 2010-11 share market scam, a probe led by banker Khondkar Ibrahim Khaled implicated Rahman in the scandal. However, in March 2015, Salman and his elder brother were acquitted, and the cases were dismissed after final hearings.

As of August 2024, companies associated with Rahman owe around ৳36,865 crore to four public and three private banks in Bangladesh. According to the Centre for Policy Dialogue, several commercial banks in Bangladesh are now "clinically dead" due to embezzlement of bank capital attributed to Rahman.

=== Arrest ===
Initially, Rahman was reported to have fled to India with Sheikh Hasina and Sheikh Rehana following Hasina's resignation on 5 August 2024. However, on 13 August, Rahman was arrested at Sadarghat along with Anisul Huq, the former Minister for Law, Justice and Parliamentary Affairs, while attempting to flee by boat. They were charged as instigators in the murder cases related to the deaths of a student and a hawker during the quota reform protest on 16 July at Dhaka College. On 6 November, he was brought before the Dhaka Metropolitan Court in connection with a further murder case filed in the Mirpur Model Thana.

=== Developments in 2025 ===
By July 2025, Rahman's legal situation had become more complex as he was formally implicated in numerous cases:

- Murder and attempted murder cases: He has been formally shown arrested in several cases related to the killing and attempted murder of protesters during the July Uprising. Investigations by the Detective Branch (DB) of police are ongoing, with investigators stating they have found crucial information during his remand.
- ACC cases for corruption and embezzlement: The Anti-Corruption Commission (ACC) has initiated multiple investigations against him. In March 2025, the ACC launched a probe into an alleged Tk 220 billion embezzlement in COVID-19 vaccine procurement. On July 21, 2025, he was formally shown arrested in a separate ACC case concerning the embezzlement of over Tk 1,100 crore in loans from IFIC Bank through fictitious companies.
- Bail petitions: All bail petitions filed by his legal team in various courts, including the High Court, have been consistently denied as of July 2025, with the courts citing the gravity of the charges.
- Assets of son frozen: In a related development, Britain's National Crime Agency (NCA) secured freezing orders in May 2025 on two London properties owned by Rahman's son, Shayan, as part of their investigation.
