= Nazmul Huda =

Bangladeshi politician (1949–2023)

- নাজমুল হুদা
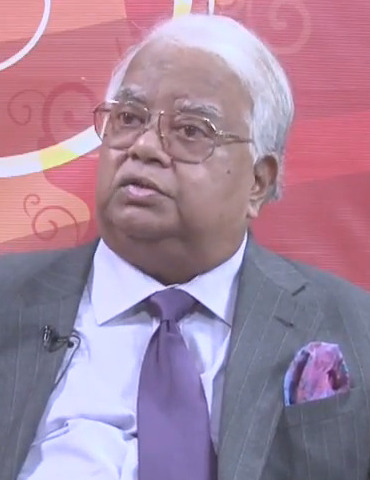
- Huda in 2017

Minister of Communications
- In office 10 October 2001 – 28 October 2006
- Prime Minister: Khaleda Zia
- Preceded by: Anwar Hossain Manju
- Succeeded by: Syed Abul Hossain

Minister of Information
- In office 19 September 1991 – 5 November 1994
- Prime Minister: Khaleda Zia
- Preceded by: Shahabuddin Ahmed
- Succeeded by: Shamsul Islam

Minister of Food
- In office 20 March 1991 – 19 September 1991
- Prime Minister: Khaleda Zia
- Preceded by: Iajuddin Ahmed
- Succeeded by: Shamsul Islam

Member of the Bangladesh Parliament for Dhaka-1
- In office 20 March 1991 – 29 October 2006
- Preceded by: Shahid Khandaker
- Succeeded by: Abdul Mannan Khan

Personal details
- Born: 6 January 1943
- Died: 19 February 2023 (aged 80) Dhaka, Bangladesh
- Party: Trinamool BNP
- Other political affiliations: Bangladesh Nationalist Party (1978–2012)
- Spouse: Sigma Huda
- Children: Antora Salima Huda; Srabanti Amina Huda
- Education: University of Dhaka

Nazmul Huda (6 January 1943 – 19 February 2023) was a Bangladeshi barrister and politician. He served as the minister of information (1991–1996) and the minister of communications (2001–2006) of the government of Bangladesh. He was a four-term Jatiya Sangsad member representing the Dhaka-1 constituency. He was a member of Bangladesh Nationalist Party since its inception until 2012 when he left the party as its vice chairman.

== Background ==
Nazmul Huda was born on 6 January 1943 to Nurul Huda, an industrialist, and a former president of Dhaka Chamber of Commerce & Industry, and Amina Huda Nazmul Huda studied at Nobokumar Institution in Bakshibazar and Notre Dame College, Dhaka. He then earned his bachelor's and master's degrees in political science from the University of Dhaka. He went to London in 1965 to study law and was called by Lincoln's Inn and became a barrister in 1969.

== Career ==
Huda returned to Dhaka to join legal practice after the Bangladesh Liberation War in 1971 and became one of its earliest practicing barristers, advising national and multinational corporations, and foreign embassies.

Huda started his political career with Jagodal, a party founded by a former President of Bangladesh Ziaur Rahman in 1977. He became the founding member of Bangladesh Nationalist Party (BNP). He served as the president of Bangladesh Supreme Court Bar Association.

Huda was elected to Parliament from Dhaka-1 in 1991 as a candidate of Bangladesh Nationalist Party. He received 55,152 votes while his nearest rival, Md. Mahbubur Rahman, of the Awami League received 31,245 votes. He was appointed the Minister of Information in the first Khaleda Zia cabinet.

Huda was elected to the parliament from Dhaka-1 in the February 1996 Bangladeshi general election and the June 1996 Bangladeshi general election as a candidate of Bangladesh Nationalist Party. He received 38,172 votes in the June election while his nearest rival, Md. Hasem Ali, of the Awami League received 20,005 votes.

Huda was re-elected to Parliament from Dhaka-1 in 2001 as a candidate of Bangladesh Nationalist Party. He received 48,347 votes while his nearest rival, Salman F Rahman, of the Awami League received 45,576 votes. He was appointed the Minister of Communication in the Third Khaleda Zia Cabinet. As Minister he pushed for a ban on import of recondition vehicles and usage of compressed natural gas as fuel.

On 21 March 2007, the Anti-Corruption Commission (ACC) filed a case accusing Huda, while he was the communications minister during 2001–2006, of taking Tk 2.40 crore as bribe from a businessman, Mir Zahir Hossain, in exchange for awarding him Tk 30 crore government contracts for construction work. On 27 August, he was sentenced to 7 years of rigorous imprisonment. Based on the appeal, the High Court, on 20 March 2011, had acquitted him of the charges but on 1 December 2014, the Supreme Court's Appellate Division scrapped the acquittal. On 8 November 2017, the High Court commuted the jail term to 4 years. The Supreme Court asked Huda to surrender in this case in January 2018. After surrendering, Huda was sent to prison on 7 January 2019. On 21 January, the Supreme Court granted bail in this case.

On 27 July 2007, Golam Mohammad Siraj, a BNP politician and owner of Cab Express Ltd, filed a case against Huda and his wife accusing them of extorting two Maruti cars in 2003. A Dhaka court, on 12 June 2008, sentenced Huda to 12 years of rigorous imprisonment in this case. But in September 2015, the High Court scrapped the lower court verdict and acquitted him.

In September 2007, Huda supported Abdul Mannan Bhuiyan after former Prime Minister Khaleda Zia expelled him from the Bangladesh Nationalist Party.

On 3 April 2008, Huda was sentenced to 12 years' imprisonment on charges of concealing wealth information and illegally amassing wealth. Following an appeal, the High Court, in August 2010, acquitted him in this case. But, the Supreme Court scrapped the acquittal verdict in September 2015. On 18 June 2008, ACC filed a case accusing Huda and his wife of taking Tk 6 lakh as bribe from a contractor. The High Court scrapped the case in 2016 but in 2017, the Appellate Division cancelled the High Court verdict. Following a petition, on 8 July 2019, the High Court asked ACC to end inquiry within 4 months.

On 21 November 2010, Huda was expelled from the Bangladesh Nationalist Party on accusation of breaking the "party's discipline". On 6 April 2011, his membership in the party was restored.

Huda refuted allegations by Prime Minister Sheikh Hasina that corruption during his tenure led to the World Bank canceling the loan for Padma Bridge and blamed it on incumbent minister of communication Syed Abul Hossain. Huda resigned from BNP as a vice chairman in June 2012 over Khaleda Zia refusing to engage in dialogue with Sheikh Hasina. He also spoke against the inclusion of Moudud Ahmed, a former leader of the Jatiya Party, and alleged Moudud had created a "gap" between Khaleda Zia and Bangladesh Army. Two months later he formed his own party Bangladesh Nationalist Front (BNF). He was ousted by the party leader S.M. Abul Kalam Azad after a few months.

Huda formed Bangladesh National Alliance (BNA) in May 2014 and Bangladesh Manabadhikar Party (BMP) in November of the same year. In November 2015, he formed his fifth political party named Trinamool BNP. Huda, as the head of an alliance of 31 parties, joined the Awami League-led 14-party combine in January 2016.

Huda was defeated in the 2018 Bangladeshi general election as a Bangladesh National Alliance (BNA) party candidate from the Dhaka-17 constituency. Akbar Hossain Pathan won the seat for the Awami League.

On 9 January 2020, ACC filed two graft cases against Huda and his family for laundering about Tk 6.73 crore in UK. They were granted bail on these charges on 10 March.

On 19 February 2020, ACC filed a case against Huda for bringing false allegation against a former Chief Justice of Bangladesh Surendra Kumar Sinha. According to the statement, Huda falsely claimed that Sinha had demanded bribe from him promising to dismiss a corruption case filed against him.

== Personal life ==
Huda was married to lawyer Sigma Huda. Together they had two daughters, Antora Salima Huda and Srabonti Ameena Huda, both are lawyer.

== Death ==
Huda died on 19 February 2023, at the age of 80, in Square Hospital, Dhaka, Bangladesh.
