= Masuda M Rashid Chowdhury =

Bangladeshi politician (1951–2021)

- মাসুদা এম রাশিদ চৌধুরী

Member of the Bangladesh Parliament for Reserved Women's Seat-45
- In office 20 February 2019 – 13 September 2021
- Preceded by: Mahjabeen Morshed
- Succeeded by: Sharifa Quader

Personal details
- Born: 22 July 1951 Raozan, Chittagong, East Bengal, Dominion of Pakistan
- Died: 13 September 2021 (aged 70) Dhaka, Bangladesh
- Party: Jatiya Party (Ershad)

Masuda M Rashid Chowdhury (22 July 1951 – 13 September 2021) was a Jatiya Party (Ershad) politician and a Jatiya Sangsad member from a reserved seat during 2019–2021.

== Background ==
Masuda M Rashid Chowdhury obtained her senior Cambridge degree from Cambridge University in 1963. She completed his bachelor's from Chittagong College and masters' from University of Dhaka.

== Career ==
Chowdhury was a faculty member at the department of sociology of the University of Dhaka. She was also a part time professor of Bangladesh University of Engineering and Technology (BUET) and a dean of People's University of Bangladesh.

Chowdhury was elected to the parliament from a reserved seat as a Jatiya Party (Ershad) candidate in February 2019. She was a vice chairman of the Jatiya Party central committee. In June, the then chairperson of the party, Hussain Muhammad Ershad had temporarily suspended her from the party which was reinstated two months later by the new chairperson GM Quader.

Chowdhury was a women entrepreneur and wrote a total of 74 books on art, social science, politics and women entrepreneurship.

== Personal life ==
Chowdhury was married to A.B.M. Fazle Rashid Chowdhury Hiru (d. 2006), a son of AKM Fazlul Kabir Chowdhury.

== Death ==
Chowdhury died on 13 September 2021 at the age of 70 at the BIRDEM hospital in Dhaka.
