= Khondaker Showkat Hossain =

Bangladeshi civil servant

- Born: Bangladesh
- Education: University of Dhaka (PhD)
- Occupation: Civil servant

Khondaker Showkat Hossain is a retired secretary and director of National Housing Finance and Investments Limited. He is the former secretary of the Ministry of Expatriates' Welfare and Overseas Employment. He is the former secretary of the Ministry of Housing and Public Works.

== Early life ==
Hossain did his bachelors, masters, and PhD at the Bengali Language department of the University of Dhaka. He received training at the Bangladesh Public Administration Training Centre and the Bangladesh Military Academy.

== Career ==
Hossain worked at the Asian Development Bank in the Good Governance Initiatives Project which sought to empower the Anti-Corruption Commission. He was the Divisional Commissioner of Dhaka Division.

In 2011, Hossain opened the Real Estate and Housing Association of Bangladesh fair violating an order of the Bangladesh High Court asking the government to not promote unauthorized real estate projects. He was made chairman of a 15-member advisory committee to manage Hatirjheel project.

While Hossain was the secretary of the Ministry of Expatriates' Welfare and Overseas Employment, the Anti-Corruption Commission filed three cases against him on charges of abuse of power and corruption over his work as the secretary of the Ministry of Housing and Public Works from 2010 to 2011. He had allocated public land to himself, his wife, and his mother though altering documents. The commission dropped the name of Rajuk Chairman M. Nurul Huda after his wife returned the plot. Bangladesh Financial Intelligence Unit asked banks to provide information on bank accounts of Hossain.

Hossain took steps to increase the recruitment of Bangladeshi workers in Malaysia. He took steps to establish safe houses for Bangladeshi women migrants in destination countries. He moved to open a labour wing at the Embassy of Bangladesh in Lebanon. Justice Md. Ashfaqul Islam and Justice Ashraful Kamal summoned Hossain over a contempt of court case filed over regularizing the temporary staff of Women’s Technical Training Centers.

Hossain is the Chief Advisor of Unique Group and represents in subsidiary, Borak Travels (Pvt.) Limited, on the board of directors of National Housing Finance and Investments Limited. In July 2023, he was appointed managing editor of The Business Post.

After the fall of the Sheikh Hasina led Awami League government, a murder case was filed against Hossain by Bangladesh Nationalist Party politician Mohammad Zaman Hossain Khan over the death of a protestor in July 2024.
