= Khondoker Abu Ashfaque =

Bangladeshi politician

- খোন্দকার আবু আশফাক
- Ashfaque in 2026

Member of Parliament
- Incumbent
- Assumed office 17 February 2026
- Preceded by: Salman F Rahman
- Constituency: Dhaka-1

Personal details
- Born: 8 August 1966 (age 60) Nawabganj Upazila, Dhaka, East Pakistan
- Party: Bangladesh Nationalist Party

Khondoker Abu Ashfaque is a Bangladesh Nationalist Party politician and a Jatiya Sangsad member-elect representing the Dhaka-1 (Dohar–Nawabganj) constituency.

== Background ==
Ashfaq was born to Abdul Alim Khandaker and Noorjahan Begum.

== Career ==
In December 2018, the High Court barred Ashfaq to participate in the 2018 Bangladeshi general election on the ground of a petition which claimed he had been holding the office of Nawabganj Upazila Parishad chairman and hence he was ineligible for contesting the polls.

Ashfaq is a member of the executive committee of Bangladesh Nationalist Party (BNP). He became the president of the Dhaka district unit of BNP in November 2022.

At the aftermath of the fall of the Hasina government in August 2024, Ashfaq was accused of leading vandalism at the BAIRA building in Dhaka.

Ashfaq won the 2026 Bangladeshi general election contesting at the Dhaka-1 constituency securing 173,781 votes while his nearest opponent Bangladesh Jamaat-e-Islami candidate Mohammad Nazrul Islam received 112,622 votes.

== Personal life ==
Ashfaq has six brothers & one sister– Professor Dr Khondaker Abul Bashar, Abul Hossain Khandker, a former joint district judge of Feni, and Abul Kalam Khandaker, the General Secretary of Nawabganj Upazila BNP. In a 2012 case, they were all accused of occupying Brajo Niketan, a former Hindu zamindar Brajan Roy's palace at Nawabganj Upazila, Dhaka.

Ashfaq was infected with COVID-19 virus in June 2020.
