= Dhaka-1 =

Constituency of Bangladesh's Jatiya Sangsad

Coordinates: 23.66°N 90.16°E

- Constituency for the Jatiya Sangsad
- District: Dhaka District
- Division: Dhaka Division
- Electorate: 545,140 (2026)

Current constituency
- Created: 1973
- Party: Bangladesh Nationalist Party
- Member: Khondoker Abu Ashfaque
- ← 173 Manikganj-3 175 Dhaka-2 →

Dhaka-1 is a constituency represented in the Jatiya Sangsad (National Parliament) of Bangladesh since 2026 by Khondoker Abu Ashfaque of the Bangladesh Nationalist Party.

== Boundaries ==
The constituency encompasses Dohar and Nawabganj upazilas.

== History ==
The constituency was created for the first general elections in newly independent Bangladesh, held in 1973.

Ahead of the 2008 general election, the Election Commission redrew constituency boundaries to reflect population changes revealed by the 2001 Bangladesh census. The 2008 redistricting added 7 new seats to the Dhaka metropolitan area, increasing the number of constituencies in the capital from 8 to 15, and reducing the extent of the constituency.

== Members of Parliament ==
| Election | Member | Party |
|---|---|---|
| 1973 | Abu Md. Saidur Rahman | Awami League |
| 1979 | Khandaker Delwar Hossain | Bangladesh Nationalist Party |
| 1986 | Shahid Khandaker | Jatiya Party |
| 1991 | Nazmul Huda | Bangladesh Nationalist Party |
| Feb 1996 | Nazmul Huda | Bangladesh Nationalist Party |
| Jun 1996 | Nazmul Huda | Bangladesh Nationalist Party |
| 2001 | Nazmul Huda | Bangladesh Nationalist Party |
| 2008 | Abdul Mannan Khan | Awami League |
| 2014 | Salma Islam | Jatiya Party (Ershad) |
| 2018 | Salman F Rahman | Awami League |
| 2024 | Salman F Rahman | Awami League |
| 2026 | Khondoker Abu Ashfaque | Bangladesh Nationalist Party |

== Elections ==
=== Elections in the 2020s ===
General Election 2026: Dhaka-1
| Party | Candidate | Votes | % | ±% |
|---|---|---|---|---|
| BNP | Khondoker Abu Ashfaque | 173,781 | 58.0 | N/A |
| Jamaat | Mohammad Najrul Islam | 112,622 | 37.6 | N/A |
| IAB | Nurul Islam | 6,607 | 2.2 | N/A |
| Independent | Antora Salima Huda | 4,880 | 1.6 | N/A |
| JP(E) | Md. Nasir Uddin Molla | 1,362 | 0.5 | N/A |
| Labour | Shek Md. Ali | 271 | 0.1 | N/A |
| Majority | | 61,159 | 20.4 | N/A |
| Turnout | | 299,523 | 54.9 | N/A |
| Registered electors | | 545,140 | | |
| BNP gain from AL | | | | |

=== Elections in the 2010s ===
General Election 2014: Dhaka-1
| Party | Candidate | Votes | % | ±% |
|---|---|---|---|---|
| JP(E) | Salma Islam | 53,341 | 52.3 | N/A |
| AL | Abdul Mannan Khan | 48,690 | 47.7 | −7.2 |
| Majority | | 4,651 | 4.6 | −7.5 |
| Turnout | | 102,031 | 26.9 | −61.9 |
| JP(E) gain from AL | | | | |

=== Elections in the 2000s ===
General Election 2008: Dhaka-1
| Party | Candidate | Votes | % | ±% |
|---|---|---|---|---|
| AL | Abdul Mannan Khan | 155,864 | 54.9 | +6.4 |
| BNP | Abdul Mannan | 121,377 | 42.8 | −8.6 |
| IAB | Mijanur Rahaman Milon | 4,681 | 1.6 | N/A |
| Zaker Party | Mokter Hossain | 1,303 | 0.5 | N/A |
| BRWP | Khandaker Ali Abbas | 473 | 0.2 | N/A |
| PDP | Shudhir Kumar Hazra | 194 | 0.1 | N/A |
| Majority | | 34,487 | 12.1 | +9.2 |
| Turnout | | 283,892 | 88.8 | +10.0 |
| AL gain from BNP | | | | |

General Election 2001: Dhaka-1
| Party | Candidate | Votes | % | ±% |
|---|---|---|---|---|
| BNP | Nazmul Huda | 48,347 | 51.4 | −3.6 |
| AL | Salman F Rahman | 45,576 | 48.5 | +19.7 |
| Jatiya Party (M) | Haroon-Ur-Rashid Khan | 110 | 0.1 | N/A |
| Majority | | 2,771 | 2.9 | −23.3 |
| Turnout | | 94,033 | 78.8 | −1.2 |
| BNP hold | | | | |

=== Elections in the 1990s ===
General Election June 1996: Dhaka-1
| Party | Candidate | Votes | % | ±% |
|---|---|---|---|---|
| BNP | Nazmul Huda | 38,172 | 55.0 | −5.8 |
| AL | Md. Hasem Ali | 20,005 | 28.8 | −5.6 |
| JP(E) | Shahid Khandaker | 6,133 | 8.8 | +8.4 |
| IOJ | A. Rahim | 2,703 | 3.9 | N/A |
| Jamaat | Mohammed Ullah | 1,037 | 1.5 | N/A |
| Zaker Party | Matiur Rahman | 569 | 0.8 | −3.2 |
| WPB | Md. Karam Ali | 245 | 0.4 | N/A |
| Independent | Md. Shamsul Haque Bachchu | 213 | 0.3 | N/A |
| Gano Forum | Jahanara Begum | 184 | 0.3 | N/A |
| BKA | Mohiuddin Ahmed | 159 | 0.2 | N/A |
| Majority | | 18,167 | 26.2 | −0.1 |
| Turnout | | 69,420 | 80.0 | +19.3 |
| BNP hold | | | | |

General Election 1991: Dhaka-1
| Party | Candidate | Votes | % | ±% |
|---|---|---|---|---|
| BNP | Nazmul Huda | 55,152 | 60.8 | |
| AL | Md. Mahbubur Rahman | 31,245 | 34.4 | |
| Zaker Party | Kamal Ahmed | 3,632 | 4.0 | |
| JP(E) | Shahid Khandakar | 369 | 0.4 | |
| Independent | Mozaffar Hossain | 341 | 0.4 | |
| Majority | | 23,907 | 26.3 | |
| Turnout | | 90,739 | 60.7 | |
| BNP gain from JP(E) | | | | |
