= Asadul Habib Dulu =

Bangladeshi politician

- আসাদুল হাবিব দুলু
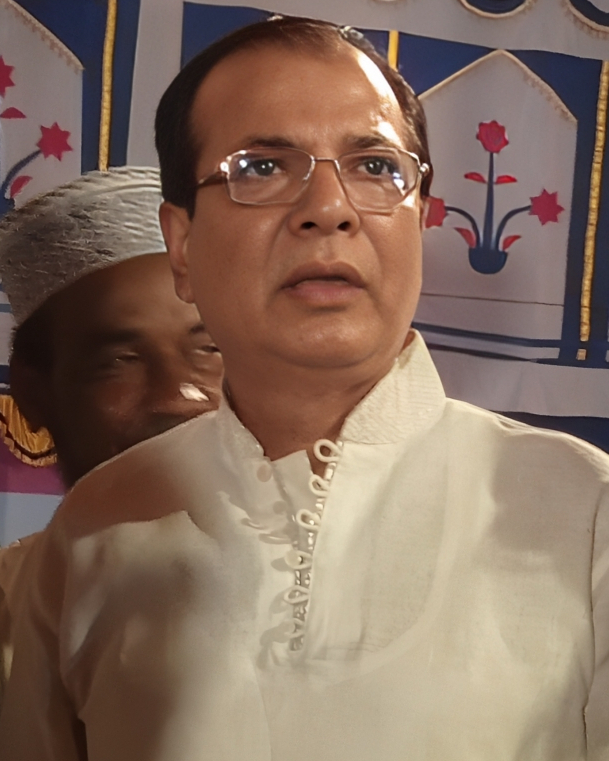
- Dulu in 2023

Minister of Disaster Management and Relief
- Incumbent
- Assumed office 17 February 2026
- Prime Minister: Tarique Rahman
- Preceded by: Faruk-e-Azam

Member of the Bangladesh Parliament for Lalmonirhat-3
- Incumbent
- Assumed office 17 February 2026
- Preceded by: Motiar Rahman
- In office 28 October 2001 – 27 October 2006
- Preceded by: GM Quader
- Succeeded by: GM Quader
- In office 19 March 1996 – 30 March 1996
- Preceded by: Md. Riaz Uddin Ahmed
- Succeeded by: GM Quader

Deputy Minister for Disaster Management and Relief
- In office 22 May 2003 – 29 October 2006
- Prime Minister: Khaleda Zia

Personal details
- Born: 5 August 1960 (age 66) Lalmonirhat District, East Pakistan
- Party: Bangladesh Nationalist Party
- Education: University of Rajshahi
- Occupation: Politician

Asadul Habib Dulu (born 5 August 1960) is a politician of the Bangladesh Nationalist Party and the incumbent Jatiya Sangsad member representing the Lalmonirhat-3 constituency since February 2026. He has been the incumbent minister of disaster management and relief since February 2026. He served as a deputy minister of the same ministry during 2003–2006.

== Early life and education ==
Dulu was born on 5 August 1960 in Lalmonirhat District, East Pakistan (now Bangladesh). He completed his master's degree in economics from the University of Rajshahi.

== Political career ==
He is the organizing secretary, Rangpur division, of the Bangladesh Nationalist Party.

== Corruption charges ==
In October 2007, the Anti-Corruption Commission (ACC) released a list of 35 graft suspects, which included Dulu. However, in October 2008, the ACC exempted him from the graft charges due to a lack of enough evidence, but they filed a charge regarding misappropriating 201 pieces of corrugated iron sheets against Dulu.

On 24 January 2009, the ACC filed a case against Dulu, accusing him of amassing illegal wealth and concealing wealth information in the statements submitted to the commission in February 2007. In September, they pressed the charge sheet.

== Personal life ==
Dulu is married to Laila Habib. Together they have two sons, Ahnaf Habib and Ahmik Habib
