= Shaw Wallace Bangladesh Limited =

- Formation: 1886 (original); 1972 (Shaw Wallace Bangladesh Ltd.)
- Founder: Robert Gordon Shaw & Charles William Wallace (original founders); Rezaur Rahman (founder of Shaw Wallace Bangladesh Ltd.)
- Headquarters: Chittagong, Bangladesh
- Region served: Bangladesh
- Services: Tea, shipping, logistics, customs clearance, financial institutions, warehouses
- Parent organization: AF Mujibur Rahman Foundation

Shaw Wallace Bangladesh Limited (Bengali: শ ওয়ালেস বাংলাদেশ লিমিটেড) is a Bangladeshi diversified conglomerate based in Chittagong. It is the successor of Shaw Wallace & Co. Ltd., which was established in 1886 in Kolkata by Robert Gordon Shaw and Charles William Wallace.

== History ==
The original company produced chemicals, liquor, shipping lines, and tea. In 1947, following the partition of India the company was also partitioned in two. Shaw Wallace India Limited received liquor and chemicals business and Shaw Wallace Pakistan Limited received the tea and shipping business segments. It was the agent of DDG Hansa in Chittagong.

Following the Bangladesh Liberation War in 1971, the shipping business was nationalized in Bangladesh as Messers Shaw Wallace. It was bought from the government by Rezaur Rahman, a chartered accountant, in 1979. Rezaur Rahman was one of the founding partners of the Bangladeshi chartered accountancy firm Rahman Rahman Huq (the Bangladeshi representative firm of KPMG). Rahman would use the profits from the company to establish International Leasing and Financial Services Limited and National Housing Finance and Investments Limited in the 1990s. In 2002, Rahman purchased 100% of the shares Shaw Wallace Bangladesh Ltd. He placed the company under AF Mujibur Rahman Foundation, named after his father A. F. Mujibur Rahman, which provides scholarships to college and university students. He placed the shares of the International Leasing and Financial Services Limited and National Housing Finance and Investments Limited under Shaw Wallace Bangladesh Limited.

The foundation used profits from Shaw Wallace Bangladesh to build AF Mujibur Rahman Mathematics Building of the University of Dhaka. In 2008, Rezaur Rahman moved to England after falling sick and left the company to his brother Mizanur Rahman. The same year Nurul Alam became managing director of the company. He sold seven tea gardens of Shaw Wallace Bangladesh Limited. He closed the clearing and forwarding, shipping, and spice businesses of Shaw Wallace Bangladesh Limited. International Leasing and Financial Services Limited fell victim to scams by P. K. Halder and lost 35 billion Bangladeshi taka. The Anti-Corruption Commission began an investigation into Nurul Alam, suspecting links to Halder, following which Alam resigned from the company in 2019. The commission also summoned Shaw Wallace Bangladesh directors Mizanur Rahman, Rezaur Rahman, and Syeada Ruhi Gaznabi. The Commission froze the accounts of Nurul Alam. These resulted in financial difficulties for the company and led to shares of International Leasing and Financial Services Limited and National Housing Finance and Investments Limited being sold.

== Present ==
The company is at the brink of being winded up. After the PK Halder scam, in which International Leasing and Financial Services Limited was heavily affected, the company has been on a continuous downward spiral. Even though Shaw Wallace retains its shipping and customs agency licenses, they have wound up their business in the logistics sector. The company's current sources of income are selling tea it purchases from auction, and dividends they collect from their remaining holdings in International Leasing and Financial Services Ltd. and National Housing Finance and Investments Ltd.

== Subsidiaries ==
- National Housing Finance and Investments Limited (2.21%)
- International Leasing and Financial Services Limited (17.36%)
- SW Shipping Limited
