= Farid Ahmed =

Farid Ahmed may refer to:

- Farid Ahmed (politician)
- Farid Ahmed (judge)
- Farid Ahmed (musician)
- Farid Ahmad, Pakistani politician
