= Sharifa Quader =

Bangladeshi politician

- শেরীফা কাদের

Member of Parliament for Reserved women's seats-45
- In office 1 November 2021 – 9 January 2024
- Preceded by: Masuda M Rashid Chowdhury

Personal details
- Born: Lalmonirhat
- Party: Jatiya Party (Ershad)
- Spouse: GM Quader
- Relations: Mahfuz Ahmed (son-in-law)

Sharifa Quader is a Bangladeshi politician who was the Jatiya Sangsad member from the reserved women's seat-45.

== Career ==
Quader is advisor to the chairman of Jatiya Party, president of Jatiya Sanskritik Party and president of Lalmonirhat district Jatiya Party.

On 13 September 2021, Masuda M Rashid Chowdhury, a Jatiya Sangsad member from the reserved women's seat-45 of the 11th National Assembly died in office. In the by-election of this vacant seat, on 1 November, Quader was nominated without a contest.

She lost in the 2024 Bangladeshi general election in Dhaka-18 constituency to an independent candidate Md Khosru Chowdhury by a huge margin. She bagged only 6,555 votes with the 'plough' symbol and came third in the seat.

== Personal life ==
Quader is married to GM Quader, the current chairman of Jatiya Party. Her daughter Ishrat Jahan Quader's husband is actor Mahfuz Ahmed.
