= Nurul Islam Babul =

Bangladeshi businessperson (1946–2020)

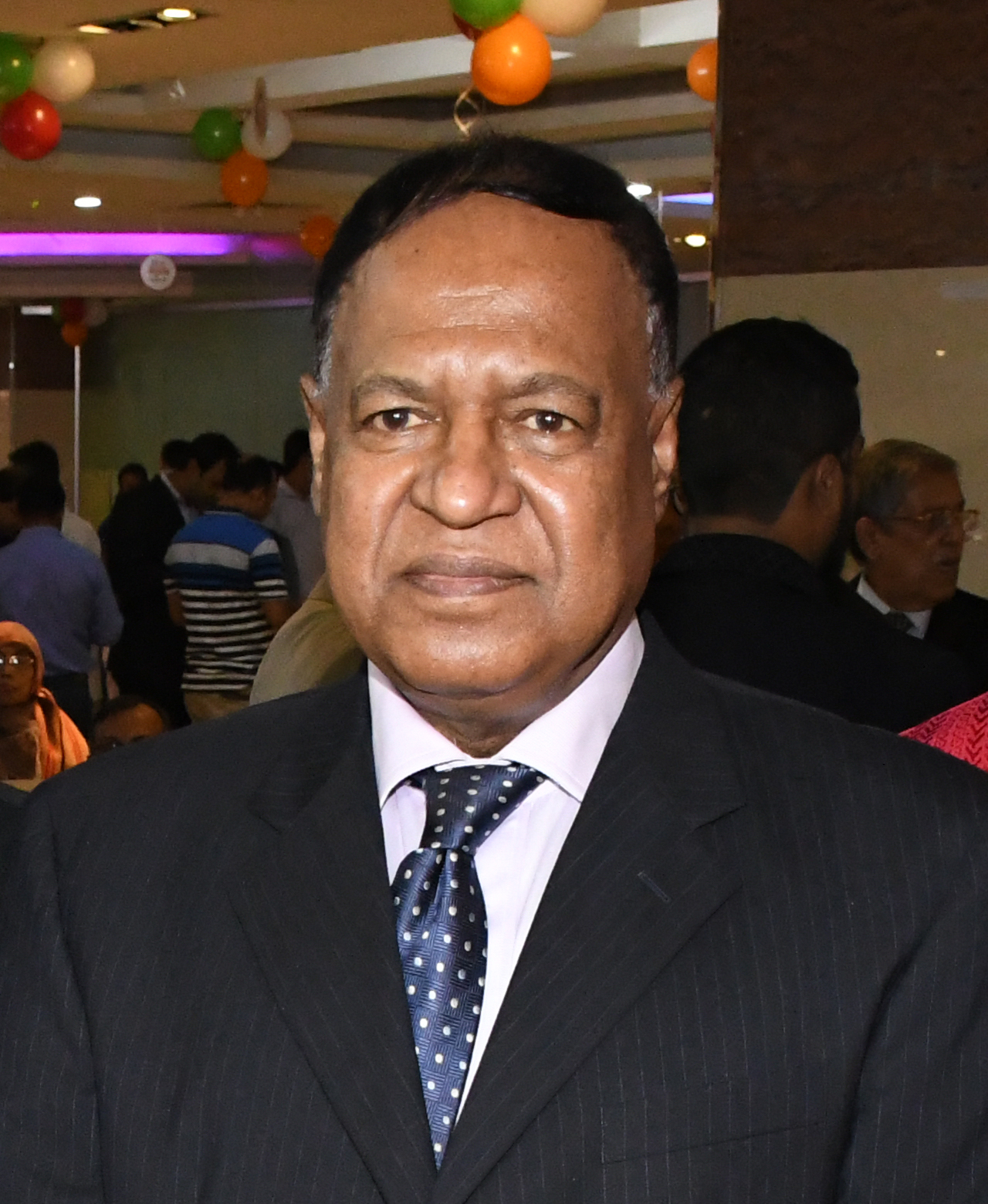
- Babul in Feb 2020
- Born: 3 May 1946; Nawabganj, Dhaka, Bengal Presidency, British India
- Died: 13 July 2020 (aged 74); Dhaka, Bangladesh
- Occupation: Chairman at Jamuna Group
- Spouse: Salma Islam
- Children: 4

Nurul Islam Babul (Bengali: নুরুল ইসলাম বাবুল; 3 May 1946 – 13 July 2020) was a Bangladeshi business magnate. He was the founder and chairman of the business conglomerate Jamuna Group.

He died on 13 July 2020 after being hospitalized in Dhaka for a few days.

== Early life ==
Nurul was born in Nawabganj, Dhaka to Amjad Hossen and Jomila Khatun in a Bengali Muslim family.

== Career ==
Best known for the Jamuna Group and Jamuna Future Park, Babul was also the owner of the Bangla daily Jugantor. He founded the group in 1970s.

== Controversies ==
In April 2003, Babul was arrested by Bangladesh Police for making a death threat against the then chairman of the Board of Investment and founder of the Amar Desh newspaper Mahmudur Rahman. He was later released on bail. In the same case he was also accused of land grabbing charges in Savar. Prior to this incident, the former Bangladeshi State Minister of Home Affairs Lutfozzaman Babar filed a case against Babul where he accused Babul of threatening to kill him.

Babul was arrested in 2004 in connection with the murder of a dredger worker, Alam Pramanik, who was working on a real estate project in Badda in 2003. Around 100 law enforcement officers from various security agencies of Bangladesh raided Babul's house in Gulshan, Dhaka shortly after midnight in March 2004. The raid was monitored by the then Home Minister Lutfozzaman Babar and had permission from the Prime Minister's Office. He was denied bail by the Court of Chief Metropolitan Magistrate. A case was filed by the owner of the dredger who claimed that 12 of Babul's men forcefully entered the dredger where his workers (including Pramanik) were sleeping and opened fire. An injured Pramanik was taken to a hospital where he later died. Babul's defence lawyers claimed that these allegations were a part of a conspiracy that was hatched by people who were jealous of Babul's success and wanted to ruin his image.

In May 2013, Babul along with his wife Salma Islam and son Shamim Islam were sued by the National Board of Revenue for tax evasion and providing false information about their income. The 3 accused were charged for dodging over Tk. 45 crore in income tax and not submitting wealth statements of Tk. 155 crore in their tax returns. The NBR also filed cases against 7 companies of Jamuna Group.

In 2013, the police attempted to arrest Babul from the residence of former Bangladeshi President H M Ershad.

== Personal life ==
Babul was married to Salma Islam, ‍a member of the Jatiya Sangsad from the Jatiya Party. He had 4 children with her: Shamim Islam, Soniya Islam, Monika Islam and Rozalin Islam.

== Death ==
In June 2020, Babul tested positive for the coronavirus amidst the COVID-19 pandemic in Bangladesh. Subsequently, he was admitted to the Evercare Hospital in Dhaka. Babul died on 13 July 2020 aged 74 from COVID-19 complications during the COVID-19 pandemic in Bangladesh at the Evercare Hospital in Dhaka.
