= Mahjabeen Morshed =

Bangladeshi politician

- মাহজাবিন মোরশেদ

Member of the Bangladesh Parliament for Reserved Women's Seat-44
- In office 2009–2014
- Succeeded by: Noor-E-Hasna Lily Chowdhury

Member of the Bangladesh Parliament for Reserved Women's Seat-45
- In office 2014–2019
- Preceded by: Salma Islam
- Succeeded by: Masuda M Rashid Chowdhury

Personal details
- Born: 22 March 1969 (age 57)
- Party: Jatiya Party
- Spouse: Murad Ibrahim

Mahjabeen Morshed (born 22 March 1969) is a Jatiya Party politician and a former Jatiya Sangsad member from women reserved seats.

== Career ==
Morshed was elected to parliament from women reserve seat-45 in 2014 as a Jatiya Party candidate. On 10 January 2018, the Anti-Corruption Commission sued her and her husband, Murad Ibrahim, for embezzling 2.75 billion taka from BASIC Bank Limited. Her husband is the managing director of Crystal Steel and Ship Breaking Limited; the loans were taken under the company name. She served as the president of Chittagong City unit of Jatiya Party but was removed from the post after she was sued by the Anti-Corruption Commission.
