= Faridun Nahar Laily =

Bangladeshi politician

- ফরিদুন্নাহার লাইলী

Member of the Bangladesh Parliament for Reserved women's seat-43
- In office 28 February 2024 – 6 August 2024
- Preceded by: Salma Islam

Personal details
- Born: 12 December 1954 (age 71) Noakhali, East Bengal, Dominion of Pakistan
- Party: Bangladesh Awami League
- Spouse: Shah Akbar Chandhan

Faridun Nahar Laily (born 12 December 1954) is a Bangladeshi politician, entrepreneur, freedom fighter, and a former Jatiya Sangsad member from the reserved women's seat of the 12th national assembly. She was previously Member of Parliament in the reserved women's seat, nominated by the Bangladesh Awami League in the Ninth National Assembly. Faridun Nahar Laily is in her third term as the Agriculture and Cooperatives Secretary of the Central Committee of the Awami League. Before this, she was the Relief and Social Welfare Secretary of the Central Committee of the Bangladesh Awami League. She has previously held the position of Senior Joint General Secretary of the Bangladesh Women's Awami League.

== Political Life ==
Laily began her political career inspired by the ideals of Bangabandhu through the politics of Bangladesh Chhatra League. She served as the general secretary and vice president of Bangladesh Chhatra League at Comilla Government Women's College. Under the direction and leadership of the Father of the Nation, Bangabandhu Sheikh Mujibur Rahman, she supported the Liberation War with full commitment and directly participated in the Liberation War to make Bangladesh independent. She graduated with a bachelor's and master's degree in political science from the University of Chittagong. During her university years, she was very popular as a political figure and also served as the elected VP of Shamsunnahar Hall at the University of Chittagong.

After the political upheaval of 1975 following the assassination of Sheikh Mujibur Rahman and his family, she continued various party programs secretly, risking her life during the critical times faced by the party.

During her student life, she was active in political activities. Laily was elected vice president of the Bangladesh Chhatra League, Comilla Women's College branch. She served as the president of the Bangladesh Chhatra League, Shamsunnahar Hall branch, University of Chittagong, and simultaneously as the VP of the Shamsunnahar Hall Students' Union. Later, Faridun Nahar Laily served as the acting general secretary of the North District Women's Awami League, Chittagong. Following her political leadership, she became the senior joint general secretary of the Bangladesh Women's Awami League. She also served multiple terms as the relief and social welfare secretary of Bangladesh Awami League. During her tenure, Cyclone Mahasen, one of the major natural disasters, hit the country. She rushed to the affected areas with relief from the Bangladesh Awami League. The people-oriented Faridun Nahar Laily is currently serving her third term as the agriculture and cooperatives secretary of the Bangladesh Awami League, performing her duties with great efficiency.

After the 2001 elections, she organized the activists of the Women's Awami League on the streets in all the programs announced by the Bangladesh Awami League in the anti-BNP-Jamaat alliance movement. As the Senior Joint General Secretary, she played an important role in organizing activists for various programs during that time. From the moment Sheikh Hasina was arrested on 11 January 2007, until her release, she staged daily sit-ins in front of the sub-jail with Women's Awami League activists.

Laily is currently serving her third term as the Agriculture and Cooperative Secretary Bangladesh Awami League. Before this, she served as the Relief and Social Welfare Secretary of Bangladesh Awami League. She previously held the position of Senior Joint General Secretary of the Bangladesh Women's Awami League.

== Family Life ==
Laily was born on 12 December 1954, in Gorapur village of Noannoi Union, Noakhali District. She is the third child of the late Saidur Rahman and the late Mahmuda Begum. Faridun Nahar Laily completed her higher secondary education from Comilla Government Women's College and earned her Bachelor's (B.A. Honors) and Master's (M.A) degrees from the University of Chittagong. Her husband, the late Shah Akbar Chandhan, was a successful businessman. Their only child, Dr. S M Akbar Jafree, completed his MBBS from Dhaka Medical College and is currently serving in the 29th BCS (Health) cadre. His wife is working as a doctor in the Bangladesh Army.

== Professional Life ==
Faridun Nahar Laily is the founding chairman of Zenith Islami Life Insurance Limited. She is also associated with various social organizations, such as the senior vice-president of Chittagong University Alumni Association, senior vice-president of Greater Noakhali Association Dhaka, and a lifetime member of Noakhali District Association Dhaka and Lakshmipur Association Dhaka. She has served as the former vice-president of Amnesty International-Bangladesh and the former director of Apex International.
