= Abu Saleh Mohammad Saeed =

Bangladeshi politician (1946–2019)

Member of Parliament for Lalmonirhat-3
- In office 9 January 2014 – 7 January 2019
- Preceded by: GM Quader
- Succeeded by: GM Quader

Personal details
- Born: 30 March 1946
- Died: 21 April 2019 (aged 73)
- Party: Bangladesh Awami League

Abu Saleh Mohammad Saeed Dulal (আবু সালেহ মোহাম্মদ সাঈদ (দুলাল)) was a Bangladesh Awami League politician and the former Member of Parliament from Lalmonirhat-3.

== Early life ==
Saeed was born on 30 March 1946. He completed his undergraduate from Bangladesh University of Engineering and Technology.

== Career ==
Saeed was elected to Parliament on 5 January 2014 from Lalmonirhat-3 as a Bangladesh Awami League candidate.

== Death ==
He died on 21 April 2019.
