= Md. Reazuddin Ahmed =

Bangladeshi politician

Muhammad Reazuddin Ahmed Bhola Mia
- রিয়াজ উদ্দিন আহমেদ

4th Deputy Speaker of the Jatiya Sangsad
- In office 25 April 1988 – 5 April 1991
- Speaker: Shamsul Huda Chowdhury
- Preceded by: Md Korban Ali
- Succeeded by: Sheikh Razzak Ali

Member of Parliament for Rangpur-13
- In office 7 March 1973 – 6 November 1976

Member of Parliament for Rangpur-15
- In office 18 February 1979 – 12 February 1982

Member of Parliament for Lalmonirhat-3
- In office 3 March 1988 – 15 February 1996
- Preceded by: Abul Hossain
- Succeeded by: GM Quader

Personal details
- Born: 24 October 1929 Lalmonirhat, Bangladesh
- Died: 14 February 1997 (aged 67) Lalmonirhat, Bangladesh
- Party: Jatiya Party

Muhammad Reazuddin Ahmed (Bengali: মোহম্মদ রিয়াজ উদ্দিন আহমেদ; 24 October 1929 – 14 February 1997), popularly known by his nick name Bhola Mia (Bengali: ভোলা মিঞাঁ), was a Bangladeshi politician, lawyer and minister. He was a member of parliament for the then Rangpur-13, then Rangpur-15 and Lalmonirhat-3 constituencies. He was the deputy speaker of the 4th parliament of Bangladesh.

== Early life and education ==
Ahmed was born on 24 October 1929 to a Bengali Muslim family in Lalmonirhat (then under Kurigram), Rangpur district, Bengal Province. His father, Dalaluddin Ahmed, was a renowned wakil of Kurigram, and his mother's name was Rahimah Begum. He received his Bachelor of Arts from the University of Calcutta in 1945, and became associated with politics whilst enrolling for law. He thereafter left education to pursue his political career.

== Career ==
Riaz Uddin Ahmed was a lawyer and organiser of the Bangladesh Liberation War. He played an active role in all the political activities of the time including the Six Point Movement, Bengali language movement and participation in the war.

He was elected a member of parliament from the then Rangpur-13 constituency as a candidate of Bangladesh Awami League in the first parliamentary elections of 1973.

He joined the Bangladesh Nationalist Party and was elected as a member of parliament from the then Rangpur-15 constituency as a candidate of the Bangladesh Nationalist Party in the second parliamentary elections of 1979.

In the cabinet of Abdus Sattar, he first served as the minister of labor and industrial welfare and later as the minister of agriculture, labor and social welfare. He then joined the Jatiya Party. He was elected member of parliament from Lalmonirhat-3 constituency as a candidate of Jatiya Party in the 4th Jatiya Sangsad elections of 1988 and 5th Jatiya Sangsad of 1991. On 25 April 1988, he was appointed deputy speaker. He held the post till 4 April 1991.

== Death ==
Reazuddin Ahmed died in Lalmonirhat on 14 February 1997.
