= Moinot Ghat =

Tourist attraction in Dhaka, Bangladesh

Coordinates: 23.6203°N 90.0665°E

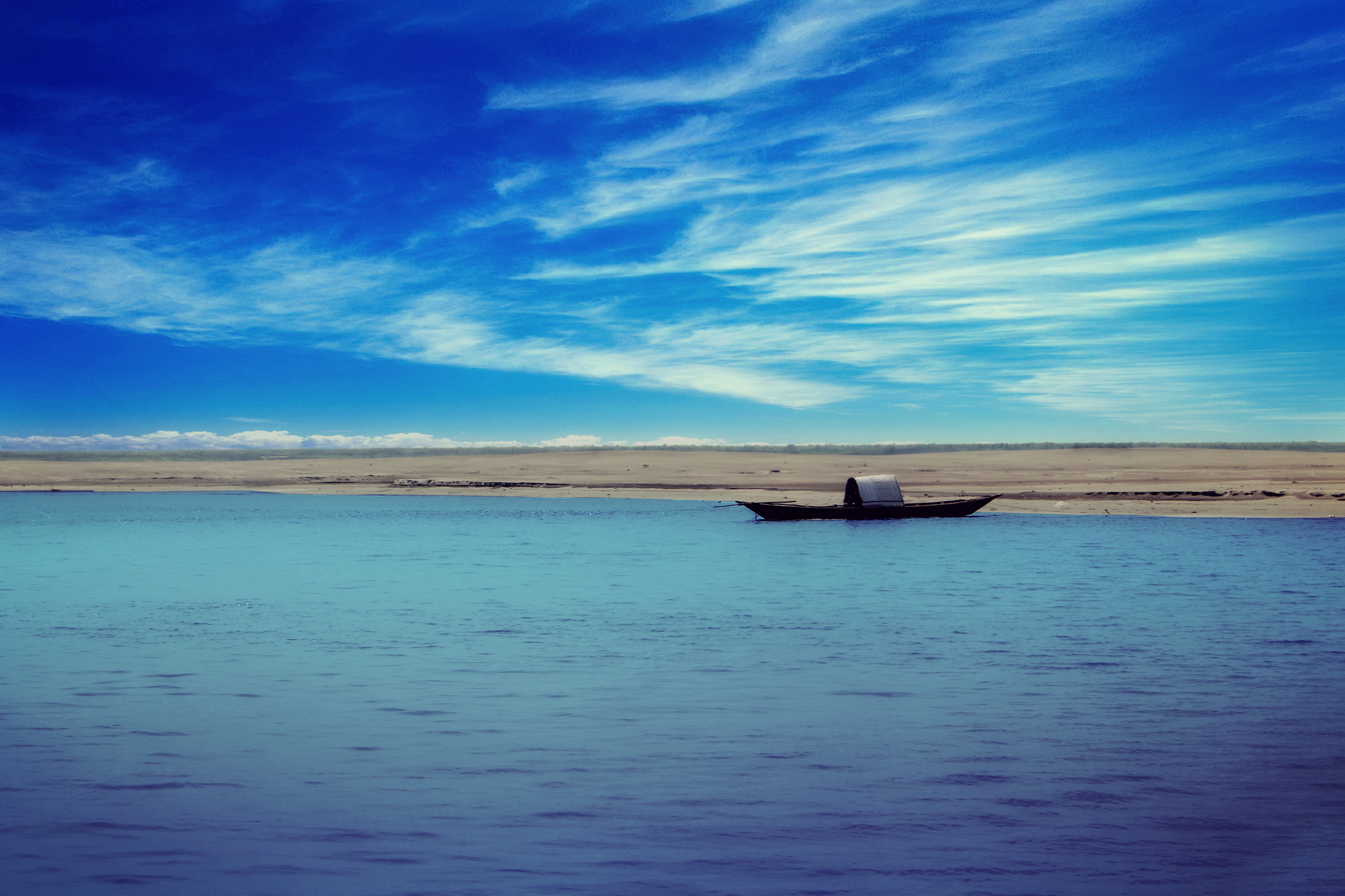

Moinot Ghat (also known as Mini Cox's Bazar) is a tourist attraction in Dohar Upazila of Dhaka.

== Location ==
Mainot Ghat is a place in Dohar upazila of Dhaka District.
