= Abu Md. Saidur Rahman =

Bangladeshi politician

Member of Bangladesh Parliament
- In office 1973–1979
- Succeeded by: Khandaker Delwar Hossain

Personal details
- Political party: Bangladesh Awami League

Abu Md. Saidur Rahman is a Bangladesh Awami League politician and a former member of parliament for Dhaka-1.

== Career ==
Rahman was elected to parliament from Dhaka-1 as a Bangladesh Awami League candidate in 1973.
