= Noor-E-Hasna Lily Chowdhury =

Bangladeshi diplomat and politician

- নুর-ই-হাস্না লিলি চৌধুরী

Member of Bangladesh Parliament

Member of Parliament for Women's Reserve seat-44
- In office 10 April 2014 – 30 December 2018
- Preceded by: Mahjabeen Morshed
- Succeeded by: Salma Islam

Personal details
- Born: 1 January 1945 (age 81)
- Party: Jatiya Party (Ershad)
- Education: BA
- Occupation: Politics & Social Welfare

Noor-E-Hasna Lily Chowdhury (Bengali: নুর-ই-হাস্না লিলি চৌধুরী) is a Jatiya Party (Ershad) politician and the former Member of Bangladesh Parliament from a reserved seat.

== Early life ==
Chowdhury was born on 1 January 1945. She has a B.A. degree.

== Career ==
Chowdhury was nominated to the 8th parliament reserved seat by Jatiya Party. She replaced the initial nominee of the party, Nasrin Jahan Ratna.

Chowdhury was nominated to reserve seat in 2009 by chairperson of Jatiya Party Hussain Mohammad Ershad. She was appointed member of the 9th parliament in March 2009.

Chowdhury was elected to parliament from reserved seat as a Jatiya Party (Ershad) candidate in 2014.
