= Motiar Rahman =

Bangladeshi politician

- মতিয়ার রহমান

Member of Parliament for Lalmonirhat-3
- In office 30 January 2024 – 6 August 2024
- Preceded by: GM Quader
- Succeeded by: Asadul Habib Dulu

Personal details
- Born: 17 February 1958 (age 68)
- Party: Bangladesh Awami League

Motiar Rahman (born 17 February 1958) was a Bangladeshi politician and a former Jatiya Sangsad member representing the Lalmonirhat-3 constituency in 2024.

== Political career ==
Motiar Rahman was involved in the politics of the Chhatra League during his student life. Later, after finishing college, he became active in the politics of the district Awami League. He has served as the general secretary of the district Awami League for a long time.

He served as the chairman of the Lalmonirhat District Council from 26 December 2011 to 30 December 2016, and again from 6 January 2017 to 25 April 2022. Most recently, on 26 September 2022, he was elected unopposed.

On 27 November 2023, Motiar Rahman resigned from his position as chairman of the Lalmonirhat District Council to contest for the post of member of parliament (MP).

On 5 August 2024, amid the non-cooperation movement, Ex-Prime Minister Sheikh Hasina resigned and fled to India. The following day, on 6 August, the president dissolved the parliament, causing him to lose his position as a member of parliament.
