= Nawabganj Govt. Pilot High School & College =

Coordinates: 23.6623°N 90.1607°E

- Established: 1905
- Location: Nawabganj, Dhaka, Bangladesh

Nawabganj Govt. Pilot High School & College is a secondary school in Kalakopa village, Nawabganj Upazila, Dhaka District, Bangladesh.

== History ==
It was established in 1905. It is one of the oldest schools in Bangladesh and the oldest in Nawabganj Upazila. It won the National award from the Ministry of Education.

It was the first school in Bangladesh to host one of many government-endorsed internet awareness days aimed at increasing internet usage amongst the population.

== See Also ==
- Nawabganj Upazila, Dhaka
