= Lalmonirhat-3 =

Bangladeshi parliamentary constituency

Coordinates: 25.92°N 89.45°E

- Constituency for the Jatiya Sangsad
- District: Lalmonirhat District
- Division: Rangpur Division
- Electorate: 307,970 (2026)

Current constituency
- Created: 1984
- Party: Bangladesh Nationalist Party
- Member: Asadul Habib Dulu
- ← 17 Lalmonirhat-2 19 Rangpur-1 →

Lalmonirhat-3 is a constituency represented in the Jatiya Sangsad (National Parliament) of Bangladesh since 2026 by Asadul Habib Dulu of the Bangladesh Nationalist Party.

== Boundaries ==
The constituency encompasses Lalmonirhat Sadar Upazila.

== History ==
The constituency was created in 1984 from a Rangpur constituency when the former Rangpur District was split into five districts: Nilphamari, Lalmonirhat, Rangpur, Kurigram, and Gaibandha.

== Members of Parliament ==
Election	Member	Party
1986	Abul Hossain	Awami League
1988	Md. Riaz Uddin Ahmed	Jatiya Party
Feb 1996	Asadul Habib Dulu	Bangladesh Nationalist Party
Jun 1996	GM Quader	Jatiya Party
2001	Asadul Habib Dulu	Bangladesh Nationalist Party
2008	GM Quader	Jatiya Party (Ershad)
2014	Abu Saleh Mohammad Sayeed	Awami League
2018	GM Quader	Jatiya Party (Ershad)
2024	Motiar Rahman	Awami League
2026	Asadul Habib Dulu	Bangladesh Nationalist Party

== Elections ==
=== Elections in the 2020s ===
General Election 2026: Lalmonirhat-3
Party	Candidate	Votes	%	±%
BNP	Asadul Habib Dulu	139,657	68.9	N/A
Jamaat	Md. Abu Taher	56,244	27.8	N/A
IAB	Aminul Islam	3,283	1.6	N/A
JP(E)	Md. Zahid Hasan	2,150	1.1	N/A
CPB	Madhu Sudan Roy	869	0.4	N/A
GSA	Dipak Kumar Roy	429	0.2	N/A
Majority		83,413	41.2	N/A
Turnout		202,632	65.8	N/A
Registered electors		307,970		
BNP gain from AL				

=== Elections in the 2010s ===
General Election 2014: Lalmonirhat-3
Party	Candidate	Votes	%	±%
AL	Abu Saleh Mohammad Sayeed	57,891	96.1	N/A
JSD	M. Khorshed Alam	1,432	2.4	N/A
JP(E)	GM Quader	931	1.5	−54.6
Majority		56,459	93.7	+80.2
Turnout		60,254	26.9	−61.4
AL gain from JP(E)				

=== Elections in the 2000s ===
General Election 2008: Lalmonirhat-3
Party	Candidate	Votes	%	±%
JP(E)	GM Quader	98,217	56.1	N/A
BNP	Asadul Habib Dulu	74,653	42.7	−2.2
IAB	Md. Abdullah	2,088	1.2	N/A
Majority		23,564	13.5	−1.0
Turnout		174,958	88.3	+13.1
JP(E) gain from BNP				

General Election 2001: Lalmonirhat-3
Party	Candidate	Votes	%	±%
BNP	Asadul Habib Dulu	63,359	44.9	+11.6
AL	Abu Saleh Mohammad Sayeed	42,912	30.4	+2.4
IJOF	GM Quader	33,805	24.0	N/A
Independent	Mir Ashrafuzzaman Kibria	402	0.3	N/A
CPB	Md. Sirajul Islam Khan	317	0.2	N/A
Independent	Md. Fazlar Rahman	164	0.1	N/A
Jatiya Party (M)	Shamsunnahar	136	0.1	N/A
Independent	Mozahar Uddin Md. Faruk	53	0.0	N/A
Majority		20,447	14.5	+11.9
Turnout		141,148	75.2	−0.3
BNP gain from JP(E)				

=== Elections in the 1990s ===
General Election June 1996: Lalmonirhat-3
Party	Candidate	Votes	%	±%
JP(E)	GM Quader	39,755	35.9	−0.8
BNP	Asadul Habib Dulu	36,881	33.3	+7.7
AL	Abu Saleh Mohammad Sayeed	30,995	28.0	−1.9
Jamaat	Md. Mosharaf Hossain Khandakar	1,829	1.7	−2.4
Gano Forum	Md. Golam Rabbani	559	0.5	N/A
Independent	Md. Abdullah	400	0.4	N/A
Zaker Party	Ansar Ali	313	0.3	−0.6
Majority		2,874	2.6	−4.3
Turnout		110,732	75.5	+16.5
JP(E) hold				

General Election 1991: Lalmonirhat-3
Party	Candidate	Votes	%	±%
JP(E)	Md. Riaz Uddin Ahmed	31,205	36.7	
AL	Abul Hossain	25,356	29.9	
BNP	Asadul Habib Dulu	21,744	25.6	
Jamaat	Md. Mosharraf Hossein	3,505	4.1	
Bangladesh Janata Party	Md. Abdul Quddus	1,990	2.3	
Zaker Party	Ansar Ali	745	0.9	
BAKSAL	Md. Motiar Rahman	260	0.3	
Jatiya Samajtantrik Dal-JSD	Md. Azizul Haq	134	0.2	
Majority		5,849	6.9	
Turnout		84,939	59.0	
JP(E) gain from				
