= Unique Group =

Bangladeshi company

- Formation: 1983
- Headquarters: Dhaka, Bangladesh
- Region served: Bangladesh
- Official language: Bengali
- Revenue: ▲US$22.53 million
- Website: www.uniquegroupbd.com

Unique Group (Bengali: ইউনিক গ্রুপ) is a Bangladeshi diversified conglomerate based in Dhaka. Salina Ali is the chairperson and Mohammad Noor Ali is the managing director of Unique Group.

== History ==
Unique Group started business in the 1983 by Mohammad Noor Ali. It started as an exporter of labour from Bangladesh.

Unique Group established Borak Travels (Pvt) Limited in 1983. It represents Aeroflot Russian Airlines and Asiana Airlines. It also operates chartered flights between Bangladesh and South Korea.

In 1991, Unique group founded Unique Tours and Travels.

Unique group established Unique Ceramic Industries Limited in 1995 with technical support from China. It also established Freight Management Limited in 1995.

In 1999, Unique Group launched Unique Vocational Training Center Limited with support from Board of Investment and Building and Construction Authority of Singapore.

Unique Group through its subsidiary, Unique Hotel & Resorts Limited, launched The Westin Dhaka in November 2000.

In 2007, Noor Ali was nominated by Awami League to contest the Bangladesh General Election on 22 January 2007 before it was cancelled. He then filed a 50 million extortion case against former Prime Minister Sheikh Hasina, Sheikh Helal, and Helal's wife Rupa Chowdhury over the contracts for three power plants in 1997 awarded to Unique Group. He withdrew the case and apologized publicly in December 2008 at a rally in Nawabganj Pilot High School. He alleged a "vested quarter" filed the case in his name. The rally was for the general elections to Dhaka-1 constituency and Sheikh Hasina was present there.

On 21 August 2008, charges were framed against Mohammad Noor Ali, managing director of Unique Group, over alleged graft in the purchase of MiG-29 for Bangladesh Air Force. The other accused in the case are former Prime Minister Sheikh Hasina, former Chief of Air Staff Jamal Uddin Ahmed, retired Air Commodore Mirza Akhter Maruf, and retired joint secretary Mohammad Hossain Serniabat. All the accused were acquitted in the verdict on the case on 2 June 2011.

Unique Group announced plans to build five more luxurious hotels in Dhaka under Starwood brands. It signed an agreement with Starwood Hotels and Resorts Worldwide on 10 March 2010 to establish three hotels in Dhaka. Beximco group bought 5 percent stake in Unique Hotels and Resorts on 17 June 2010 for 1.6 billion taka. In April 2010, Noor Ali was elected Chairperson of Eastern Bank Limited.

Unique Group received permission from Bangladesh Economic Zones Authority to establish a private economic zone in Narayanganj District on 25 August 2016. Unique Group allegedly filled up agricultural land with sand in an effort to develop the site for the economic zone affecting 12 thousand farmers in the area and in violation of a 2004 order from Bangladesh High Court.

Unique Group is a member of Star Infrastructure Development Consortium which signed Kunming Iron and Steel Holding Company of China to build a US$3.5 billion steel plant in Moheshkhali on 16 August 2018.

On 25 July 2019, Unique Meghnaghat Power, a subsidiary of Unique group, signed agreements with Bangladesh Power Development Board, Power Grid Company of Bangladesh, and Titas Gas to establish a 584 megawatts power plant at Meghnaghat, Sonargaon Upazila, Narayanganj District. The plant would be powered by natural gas and would be the largest combined cycle power plant built in Bangladesh. General Electric had joined as an equity investor in July 2018 for the powerplant in Narayanganj. Bangladesh Supreme Court, Appellate Division issued a ruling against Unique Group and ordered it to stop filling land in Sonargaon Upazila with sand on 16 August 2018.

Bangladesh High Court observed on 3 December 2020 that two subsidiaries of Unique Group, Unique Property Development Limited and Sonargaon Economic Zone, were illegally filling up wetland and water bodies near the banks of Meghna River in Sonargaon upazila, Narayanganj District.

On 30 November 2020, Additional Chief Metropolitan Magistrate of Dhaka, Asaduzzaman Noor, issued arrest warrants against Unique Group Chairperson Salina Ali and her husband and managing director of Unique Group Mohammad Noor Ali. The warrants were issued on a case filed by Selim Ahmed who is the chairperson of Jalal Ahmed Spinning Mill and Shah Fateullah Textile Mills on 24 February 2019 following a dispute over the registration of an apartment in Unique Heights building in Paribag, Dhaka. The building was built by Borak Real Estate, a subsidiary of Unique Group. The case was investigated by Police Bureau of Investigation who filed charges against the two. They two were granted bail by magistrate Asaduzzaman Noor on 1 December 2020.

In December 2020, the group suffered from decreased cash flow due to the COVID-19 pandemic in Bangladesh decreasing business in the hospitality industry. There were also legal complications over its Sheraton Dhaka project which was being constructed on top of Banani DNCC-Unique Complex owned by Dhaka North City Corporation.

In April 2021, Unique Group Divested from Dubai-based Nebras Power Investment Management B.V. and sold its stake for US$24.06 million.

== Businesses ==
- Unique Hotel and Resorts Limited (The Westin Dhaka, Westin Serviced Apartments, St. Regis, Sheraton Dhaka, and Hyatt Centric.)
- Borak Real Estate
- Unique Meghnaghat Power Limited
- Unique Eastern (Pvt.) Limited
- Unique Vocational Training Center Limited
- Tribeni International Limited
- Sonargaon Economic Zone Limited
- Update Institute, Hotel Management Institute.
- HANSA Management Limited
- Unique Share Management Limited
- Unique Ceramic Industries Limited
- Borak Travels (Pvt) Limited
- Challenger Travels & Tours Limited
- Unique Tours and Travels
- Freight Management Limited
- Amader Shomoy
- Gulshan Clinic Limited
- Daily Adhinayok
