= Jugantor =

Bangladeshi daily newspaper

- 08 September 2023 front page of Daily Jugantor
- Type: Daily newspaper
- Format: Broadsheet
- Editor: Abdul Hye Sikder
- Founded: February 1, 2000
- Political alignment: Liberal
- Language: Bengali
- Headquarters: Ka-244 Progoti Sorony, Kuril (Biswa Road), Baridhara, Dhaka; Bangladesh
- Circulation: 300,000
- Website: www.jugantor.com

Daily Jugantor (Bengali: দৈনিক যুগান্তর) is a Bengali daily newspaper in Bangladesh. The newspaper is printed and published by Jamuna Printing and Publishing Ltd. established in 1999, and administrative operations are overseen by Jamuna Media Ltd of Jamuna Group. The editor of this newspaper is Abdul Hye Sikder and publisher Salma Islam.

== History ==
The Daily Jugantor was first published on February 1, 2000 with the slogan of "Sotter Sondhane Nirveek" (Fearless in search of truth).

The newspaper owned by the Jamuna Group, and is one of the most popular Bengali language newspapers in Bangladesh.

== Features ==
- Protimoncho (Crime Scene)
- Ghore baire (Life Style)
- Jugantor dotcom (Technology)
- Tara jhil mil (Entertainment)
- Sahittyo samoyiki (Literature)
- Sajan samabesh (Reader organisation)
- Suranjana (Women page)
- Chakrir khuj (Jobs corner)
- Prokriti o jibon (Environment & Life)
- Islam o jibon (Islam [religion] & Life)

== See also ==
- List of newspapers in Bangladesh
