= Abdul Hye Sikder =

Bangladeshi poet

- Education: Rajshahi University
- Occupation: Poet

Abdul Hye Sikder is a Bangladeshi poet. He is a former executive director of the Nazrul Institute and vice president of Jatiya Nazrul Samaj. He received the Bangla Academy Literary Award in 2003.

== Education and career ==
Sikder completed his bachelor's and master's in Bengali literature from Rajshahi University. He worked as the chief of feature services of the national news agency Bangladesh Sangbad Sangstha (BSS) and assistant editor of Daily Inqilab. Sikder served as executive director of Nazrul Institute Dhaka from 2005 to 2006. He is the assistant editor of Amar Desh and as associate professor of the University of Development Alternative.

Sikder serves as the president of Mukhush Natya Sangstha.

== Personal life ==
Sikder is married to Abida Sikder. They have a son, Param Wazed Sikder and a daughter, Prokriti Wazed Sikder.

== Awards ==
- Natun Gati Sahittya Purashkar, 2010 (Kolkata, India)
- Kishorkantho Sahittyo Purashkar, 2006
- Churulia Nazrul Academy Award, 2005 (West Bengal, India)
- Bangla Academy Literary Award, 2003
- Kurigram Press Club Songbardhana, 2003
- Poet Talim Hossain Trust Shahittya Purashkar, 2003
- Moniruddin Yousuf Shahittya Padak, 2002
- Alpana Shahittya Purashkar, 2002
- Jatiya Nazrul Samaj Padak, 2001
- Kalchakra Swadhinata Padak, 2001
- Bochaganj Press Club Songbardhana, 2000
- JISAS Nazrul Padak, 1999
- Glassgo Bengali Performing Arts Padak, 1995

== Bibliography ==
=== On Kazi Nazrul Islam ===
1. Kobitirtha Chrulia (1997)
2. Nazrul in Bangladesh: Nazrul's Bangladesh (2003)
3. Bangladeshi Nazrul Chorcha: Mukhosh O Bastabota (2003)
4. Kemal Pasha: In the Eyes of Kazi Nazrul Islam (2006)
5. Moharram in Nazrul (2006)
6. Chitrokalay Nazrul (2006)
7. Jatiyo Kabi and Shaheed Zia (2006)
8. Biswamoy Nazrul (2009)

=== Poetry ===
1. Ashi Lokksyo Bhor (1987)
2. Agun Amar Bhai (1991)
3. Manab Bijoy Kabbo (1992)
4. Jugalbandhi Bhugolmoy (1992)
5. Railing Dhara Nadi (1994)
6. Ei Boddhyabhumi Ekdin Swadesh Chilo (1997)
7. Kabita Samogra (2001)
8. Dudhkumarer Janalaguli (2001)
9. Loadshedding Namiache (2001)
10. Sundarban Gatha (2003)
11. Meghmatrik Dhatutantrik (2004)
12. Sreshto Kobita (2006)
13. Hafiz, Ei Je Amar Darkhasto (2007)
14. Oti Murgi Hoilo (2008)
15. Talaknama (2010)

=== Short stories ===
1. Sukur Mamuder Chuattar Ghat (1998)

=== Travel ===
1. Vraman Somogra (2003)
2. Phire Phire Ashi (2003)
3. Sonargaon: Antare Baire Tumi Rupkatha (2001)
4. Nippon Ni Sasagu, Plassy Trazedir 234 Bachar Por (1992)
5. Dadir Boner Gach Birikshi (2005)
6. Darun Sundar Sundarbaon (2005)
7. Pakhibandhu Onik Uddan (2004)
8. Bagh Bahadur (2002)
9. Adventure Kochikhali (2002)
10. Srabontir Moner Mayabari (2002)
11. Fulporir Sab Mone Ache (2002)
12. Vasper Kespar (2003)
13. Amader Dadi (2003)
14. Kathabagher Rahoshya (2003)
15. Bagher Mohan Dari Smrity (2003)
16. Somoy Chilo Dupur (2002)
17. Gan Pakhider Din (2001)
18. Euliara Path Haralo (2001)
19. Moulana Bhashani (1995)
20. Chara Samagro (2009)
21. Haciko (2009)
22. Tom '71 (2009)
23. Amader Tom Ke Jano (2008)

=== Biography ===
1. Jana Ajana Moulana Bhashani (1997)
2. Moniruddin Yousuf (1992)

=== Essays ===
1. Bangla Shahittyo: Nakkshotrer Nayokera (2003)
2. Bangladesher Path (2000)
3. Monishar Mukh (2003)
4. Zia Uchched Prokalpo (2010)

=== Book on film ===
1. Bangladesher Chalaschitro: Itihasher Ek Oddhya (1999)

=== Books edited ===
1. Syed Ali Ahsan Smrak Grantho (2005)
2. Moniruddin Yousufer Upannash Samogro (2003)
3. Moulana Bhasanir Hok Katha (2003)
4. Obishsmaronio Sat November (2002)
5. Je Agun Chariey Dile (1993)
6. Moniruddin Yousufer Agranthito Kabita (1991)
7. Amader Milito Sangram Moulana Bhashanir Nam (1986)
8. Challish Bacharer Premer Kabita (1984)

== Filmography ==
1. Comillai Nazrul
2. Trishale Nazrul
3. Chattagrame Nazrul
