= Abdul Mannan Khan =

Bangladeshi politician (1952–2026)

- আব্দুল মান্নান খান

State Minister of Housing and Public Works
- In office 24 January 2009 – 24 January 2014
- Preceded by: Alamgir Kabir
- Succeeded by: Sharif Ahmed

Member of Parliament for Dhaka-1
- In office 25 January 2009 – 20 November 2013
- Preceded by: Nazmul Huda
- Succeeded by: Salma Islam

Personal details
- Born: 30 June 1952
- Died: 10 February 2026 (aged 73) Dhaka, Bangladesh
- Party: Bangladesh Awami League
- Spouse: Hasina Sultana

Abdul Mannan Khan (30 June 1952 – 10 February 2026) was a Bangladesh Awami League politician who was a state minister of housing and public works and a Jatiya Sangsad member representing the Dhaka-1 constituency.

== Life and career ==
=== Background ===
Khan was born on 30 June 1952. He died in Dhaka on 10 February 2026, at the age of 73.

=== Corruption charges ===
On 21 August 2014, Khan was sued by the Anti-Corruption Commission (ACC) on charges of amassing illegal wealth. Khan's asset increased to over Tk 5.25 crore from Tk 5.39 lakh in six years, according to his wealth statements submitted to the Election Commission. Three days later, a Dhaka court granted him bail till 13 October in the case.

The ACC charged Khan and his wife, Syeda Hasina Sultana, in another corruption case on 8 May 2015.

No charges were framed against the two corruption cases as of May 2019.
