= Abul Hossain (Lalmonirhat politician) =

Bangladeshi politician

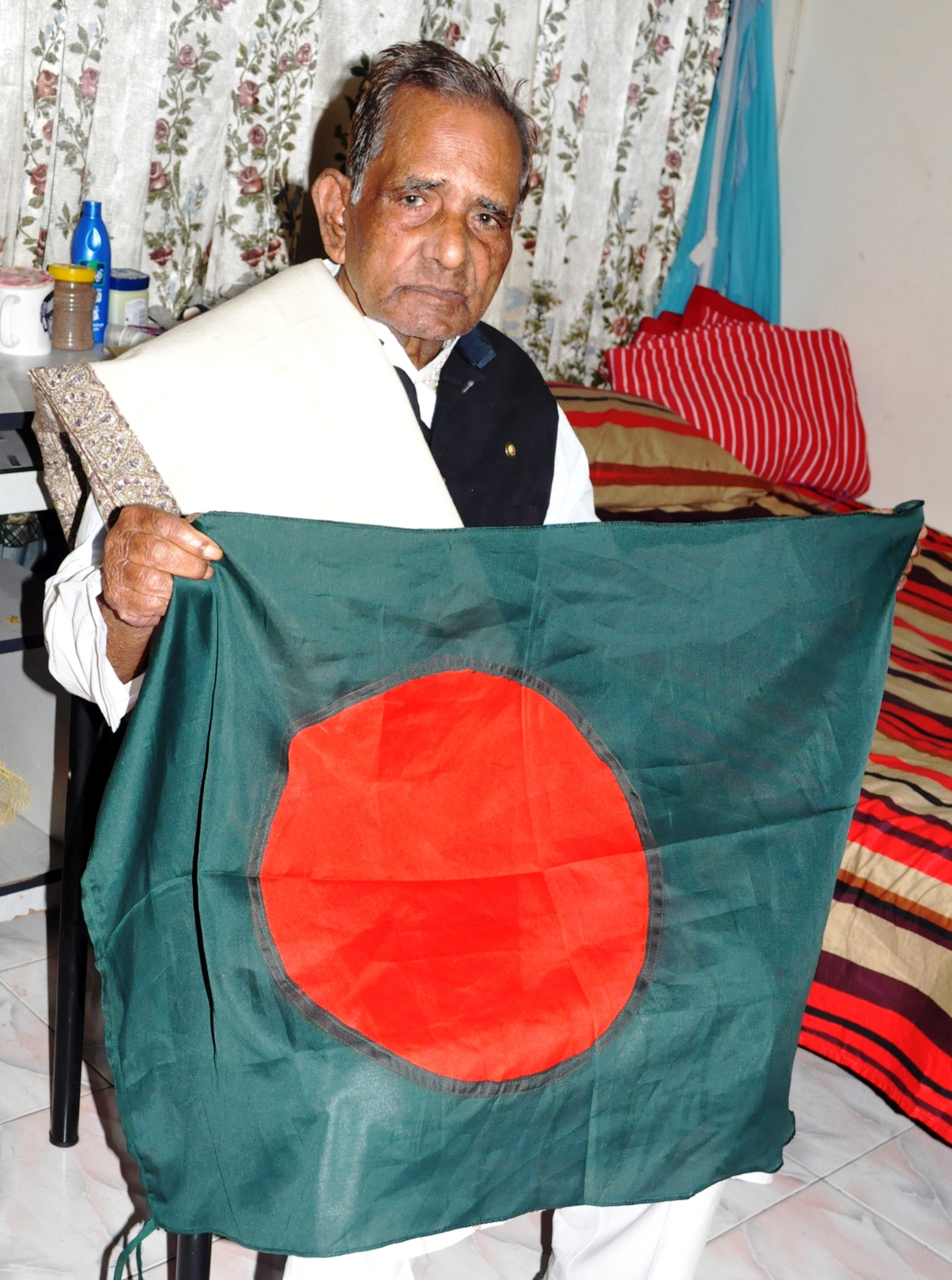

Member of Parliament for Rangpur-14
- In office 1973–1975
- Preceded by: Constituency Established
- Succeeded by: Tajul Islam Choudhury

Member of Parliament for Lalmonirhat-3
- In office 1986–1988
- Preceded by: Constituency Established
- Succeeded by: Riaz Uddin Ahmed

Personal details
- Born: c. 1935
- Died: 16 December 2016 (aged 81)
- Political party: Bangladesh Awami League

Abul Hossain (c. 1935 – 16 December 2016) was a Bangladeshi freedom fighter politician from Lalmonirhat belonging to Bangladesh Awami League. He was a member of the Jatiya Sangsad.

== Biography ==
Hossain was elected as a member of the Pakistan National Assembly in 1970. He took part in the Liberation War of Bangladesh in 1971. After the liberation he was elected as a member of the Jatiya Sangsad from Rangpur-14 in 1973. Later, he was elected as a member of the Jatiya Sangsad from Lalmonirhat-3 in 1986.

Hossain died on 16 December 2016 at the age of 81.
