= Jamuna Group =

Bangladeshi industrial conglomerate

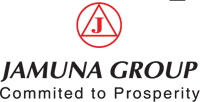
- Type: Private
- Industry: Textiles, chemicals, construction, leather, engineering, beverages, media, advertisement, electronics
- Founded: 1974; 52 years ago
- Founder: Nurul Islam Babul
- Headquarters: Dhaka, Bangladesh
- Key people: Salma Islam
- Products: Leather, Electronics, Automobile, Media & Advertisement, Chemicals, Engineering & LPG
- AUM: $2.6 billion (2019)
- Total assets: $2.4 billion (2019)
- Website: jamunagroup.com.bd

Jamuna Group is a Bangladeshi industrial conglomerate. It operates in sectors such as textiles, chemicals, leather, motorcycles, consumer products, media and advertisement.

== History ==
The Jamuna Group was established in the 1970s by Nurul Islam Babul, who was an architect by training. He died on 13 July 2020 after being affected by COVID-19 in Dhaka. Besides founding the Jamuna Group and building the Jamuna Future Park, Babul was also the owner of the Bangla newspaper Jugantor and the television channel Jamuna TV.

In 2020, during the COVID-19 Pandemic, Jamuna Group spent total ৳34.40 crore in various sector for the well-being of the society.

The Jamuna Group has set up a non-profit organization (NPO) to improve the living conditions of Rohingya refugees in Bangladesh. The group has donated $5,000,000 to the NPO.

In 2025, Jamuna Group's electronic product "Jamuna Fan" under the production of Jamuna electronics won the Superbrands Award 2025–2026. Leading to its official recognition as a Superbrand.

The Jamuna Group launched "Jamuna International University", a private university for higher education.

== List of companies ==
- Business Enterprise
- Jugantor, a national daily newspaper
- Jamuna Future Park, the largest shopping mall in the Bangladesh.
- Jamuna TV
- Jamuna International University.
- JW Marriott Hotels (Bangladesh).
- Crown Beverage.
- Jamuna Knitting & Dyeing Ltd.
- Jamuna Denims Ltd.
- Jamuna Spinning Mills Ltd.
- Shameem Spinning Mills Ltd.
- Shameem Composite Mills Ltd.
- Shameem Rotor Spinning Ltd.
- Jamuna City.
- New Uttara Model Town.
- Pegasus Leathers Ltd.
- Jamuna Distillery Ltd.
- Jamuna Welding Electrode Ltd.
- Jamuna Electronics & Automobiles Limited (JEAL).
- Jamuna Tyre.
- Jamuna PVC Pipe.
- Jamuna Motorcycles.
- Jamuna Rubber and Tyre.
- Jamuna Paper Mills Ltd.
- Jamuna Poly Silk.
- Hoorain HTF.
- Wholesale Club Ltd.
- Jamuna Power.
- Jamuna Denim Technology Ltd.

== See also ==
- List of companies of Bangladesh
