= Labanyaprabha Bose =

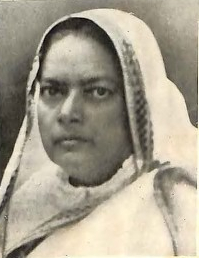
- Born: Pabna District, Bengal Presidency, British India
- Died: 1919
- Known for: Bengali literature
- Spouse: Hemchandra Sarkar
- Relatives: Jagadish Chandra Bose (brother)

Labanyaprabha Bose (Labanyaprabha Sarkar after marriage) ( ? - 1919) was a 19th-century British Indian women writer who edited the high-profile monthly children's magazine 'মুকুল' (Mukul in Bengali) for the last three years.

== Biography ==
Labanyaprabha Bose was born in the village of Radhikhal in Bikrampur, British India, now Bangladesh. Her father, Bhagwan Chandra Bose, a Brahmo, was the headmaster of Mymensingh Zilla School. Her mother, Bamasundari Bose. Labanyaprabha was the third amongst her parents' five daughters. The world-famous physicist Acharya Jagadish Chandra Bose was her younger brother. In 1907, Labanya Prabha married Hemchandra Sarkar, a physician and was engaged in literary works for a long time in her life. To facilitate religious practice in daily life, i.e. living in the light of religious beliefs and principles, worshipping God, self-improvement and achieving spiritual goals, she compiled a book titled 'দৈনিক' (Dainik in Bengali) in the form of a script, the first half and the second half of which were published in 1899 and 1901 respectively. As a result, many religious people benefited. She also wrote a good number of books in Bengali

- Neeti Katha
- Griher Katha
- Shradhyay Smaran (1912)
- Porinoy
- kobi o kabyer katha
- Pouranik Kahini Part 1 Mahabharata and Part 2 Ramayana
- Anandamohan Basur Dainik Jibani (two volumes)

Her works were well-read and hold a special place in Bengali literature.

She edited the well-known monthly children's magazine 'মুকুল (Mukul in Bengali)' for the last three years.

Labanyaprabha died in 1919.
