= GM Quader =

Bangladeshi politician

- জি এম কাদের
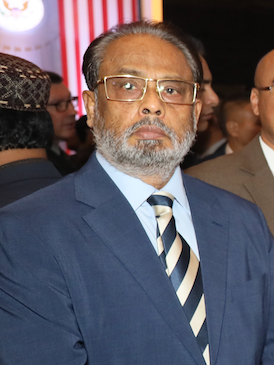
- Quader in 2023

7th Leader of the Opposition
- In office 28 January 2024 – 6 August 2024
- Prime Minister: Sheikh Hasina
- Preceded by: Rowshan Ershad
- Succeeded by: Shafiqur Rahman

Member of Parliament
- In office 10 January 2024 – 6 August 2024
- Preceded by: Hussain Muhammad Ershad
- Succeeded by: Md. Mahbubur Rahman
- Constituency: Rangpur-3
- In office 7 January 2019 – 10 January 2024
- Preceded by: Abu Saleh Mohammad Sayeed
- Succeeded by: Motiar Rahman
- Constituency: Lalmonirhat-3
- In office 6 January 2009 – 9 January 2014
- Preceded by: Asadul Habib Dulu
- Succeeded by: Abu Saleh Mohammad Sayeed
- Constituency: Lalmonirhat-3
- In office 1 October 2001 – October 2006
- Preceded by: Hussain Muhammad Ershad
- Succeeded by: Hussain Muhammad Ershad
- Constituency: Rangpur-3
- In office 23 June 1996 – 15 July 2001
- Preceded by: Md. Reazuddin Ahmed
- Succeeded by: Asadul Habib Dulu
- Constituency: Lalmonirhat-3

2nd Chairman of Jatiya Party
- Incumbent
- Assumed office 14 July 2019
- General Secretary: Shamim Haider Patwary
- Preceded by: Hussain Muhammad Ershad

Minister of Commerce
- In office 6 December 2011 – 5 January 2014
- Prime Minister: Sheikh Hasina
- Preceded by: Faruk Khan
- Succeeded by: Tofail Ahmed

Minister of Civil Aviation and Tourism
- In office 6 January 2009 – 5 December 2011
- Prime Minister: Sheikh Hasina
- Preceded by: Mirza Fakhrul Islam Alamgir
- Succeeded by: Faruk Khan

Deputy Leader Of Opposition
- In office 12 January 2014 – 11 January 2024
- Preceded by: Muhammad Jamiruddin Sircar
- Succeeded by: Syed Abdullah Mohammed Taher

Personal details
- Born: Ghulam Muhammed Quader; 24 February 1948 (age 78) Rangpur City, East Bengal, Pakistan
- Party: Jatiya Party (Ershad)
- Spouse: Sharifa Quader
- Relatives: Hussain Muhammad Ershad (brother); Mozammel Hossain Lalu (brother); Merina Rahman (sister); Mahfuz Ahmed (son-in-law)
- Education: Bangladesh University of Engineering and Technology
- Website: gmquader.com

Ghulam Muhammad Quader (born 24 February 1948) is a Bangladeshi politician and the 2nd chairman of Jatiya Party and was the Opposition Leader of Bangladesh Parliament. He is a former Jatiya Sangsad member from the Lalmonirhat-3 constituency. He served as the Minister of Commerce and Minister of Civil Aviation and Tourism from 2009 to 2014.

== Early life and family ==
Quader was born on 24 February 1948 to a Bengali Muslim family of Rangpur City with roots in Dinhata. His parents were Mokbul Hossain and Majida Khatun. Mokbul was a lawyer and served as a minister of the erstwhile Maharaja of Cooch Behar. Quader had eight siblings including the former President of Bangladesh Hussain Muhammad Ershad, banker Mozammel Hossain Lalu and Merina Rahman. He is married to Sharifa Quader.

== Education ==
Quader completed his SSC and HSC from Rangpur Zilla School and Rangpur Carmichael College. He obtained his BSc in mechanical engineering from Bangladesh University of Engineering and Technology (BUET) in 1969.

== Career ==
Quader is the chairman of the Jatiya Party (JP). Additionally, he held important posts in important ministries and organizations including the Ministry of Establishment, Bangladesh Petroleum Corporation, Jamuna Oil Company and Bangladesh Tobacco Company (now British American Tobacco Bangladesh). He worked in the Ministry of Agriculture in Iraq as a mechanical engineer from 1976 to 1977.

Quader was elected to parliament with a Jatiya Party ticket in the seventh parliamentary election and served as member of parliamentary standing committee on defence ministry. He was also elected as lawmaker in eighth parliamentary election and served as a member of standing committee on agriculture ministry.

Quader was elected to parliament from Lalmonirhat-3 on 7 January 2019 as a candidate of the Jatiya Party. He received 149,641 votes while his nearest rival, Asadul Habib Dulu of Bangladesh Nationalist Party, received 80,225 votes.

From 2016, he joined his elder brother, Hussain Muhammad Ershad, who was the founder and chairman of the Jatiya Party. Ershad had declared to make Quader the co-chairman of the party although Ershad's wife Rowshan Ershad and her MPs were against the decision. In May 2019, Ershad appointed Quader acting chairman of Jatiya Party. In July 2019, he became chairman of the party. His leadership has been challenged by Bidisha Ershad, wife of Ershad, and Rowshan Ershad, another wife of Ershad and co-chairperson of the party. In light of the 12th National Elections, his political decisions are being subject to staunch criticisms by Saquib Rahman, Editor of Progress Magazine and Senior Lecturer of Law at North South University.

After the fall of the Sheikh Hasina led Awami League government, Quader's bank accounts were frozen by the Muhammad Yunus led Interim government. Metropolitan Magistrate Masum Miah ordered the Police Bureau of Investigation to investigate him and Mujibul Haque Chunnu for trading party nominations. In May 2025, his home in Rangpur was attacked and looted by activists of the National Citizen Party and Anti-Discrimination Student Movement. Despite both sides attempting to file complaints, police have not officially registered cases against anyone. Bangladesh Army interrogated leaders of the Bangladesh Nationalist Party and Students Against Discrimination. The attack on GM Quader's residence was termed "undesirable and unfortunate" by the Anti-Discrimination Student Movement and BNP, who also expressed regret over the involvement of two of their activists. The army met with both groups' leaders to identify those responsible and urged them to prevent such incidents in the future.

Sarjis Alam, NCP coordinator, criticized the Bangladesh Army for their swift response to a minor incident at Jatiya Party chairman GM Quader's residence while questioning their efforts in arresting Awami League and Jatiya Party affiliates.
