= Shahid Khandaker =

Bangladeshi politician

Member of Bangladesh Parliament

Personal details
- Party: Jatiya Party (Ershad)

Shahid Khandaker is a Jatiya Party (Ershad) politician and a former member of parliament for Dhaka-1.

== Career ==
Khandaker was elected to parliament from Dhaka-1 as a Jatiya Party candidate in 1986 and 1988.
