= Sreenagar Upazila =

Sreenagar শ্রীনগর
- Upazila
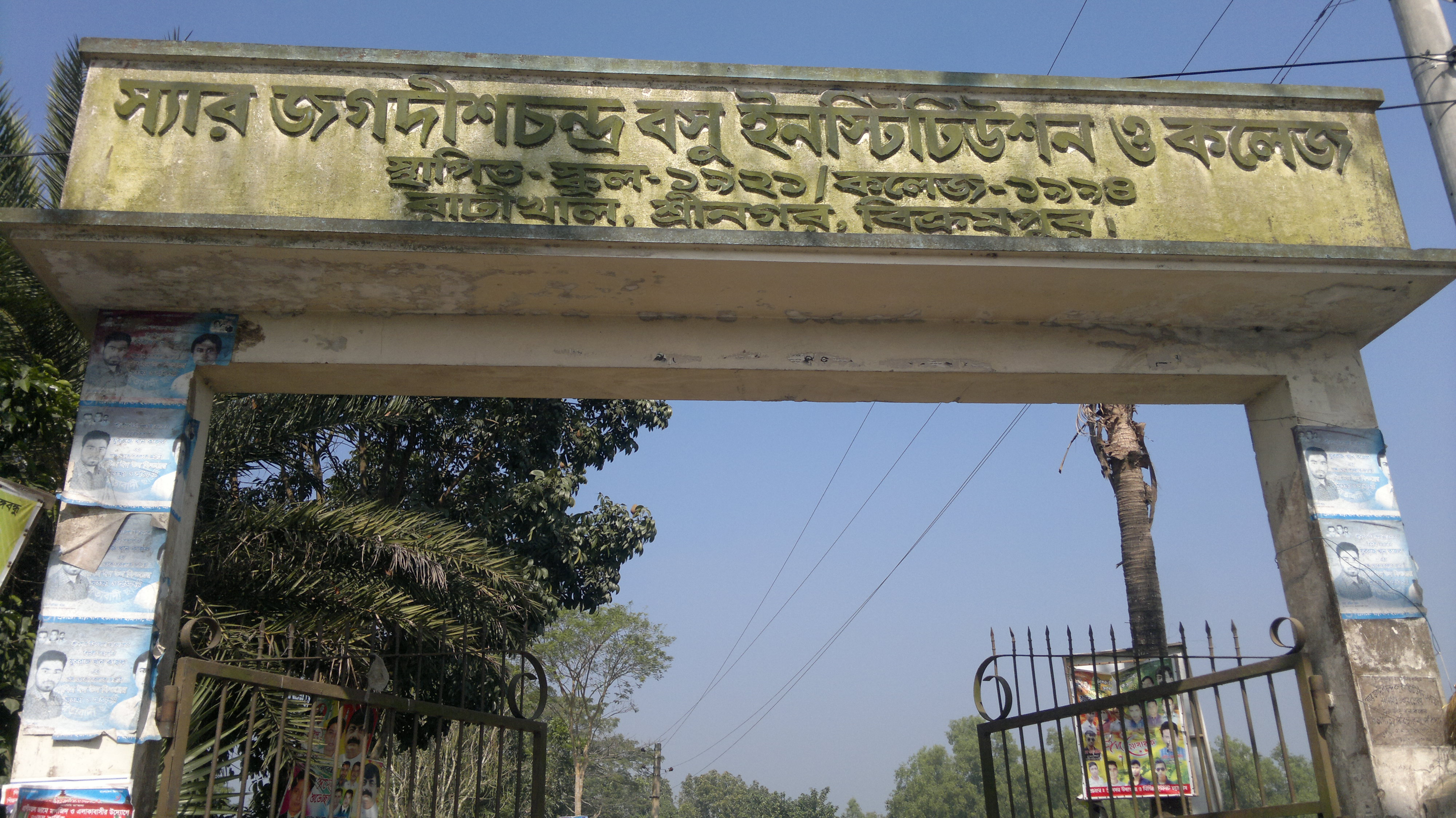
- House of Jagadish Chandra Bose

- Coordinates: 23.5361°N 90.2917°E
- Country: Bangladesh
- Division: Dhaka
- District: Munshiganj

Area
  - Total: 203.00 km^{2} (78.38 sq mi)

Population (2022)
  - Total: 293,905
  - Density: 1,447.8/km^{2} (3,749.8/sq mi)
- Time zone: UTC+6 (BST)
- Postal code: 1550
- Area code: 06925
- Website: sreenagar.munshiganj.gov.bd

Sreenagar Upazila mauza geocode map

Sreenagar (Bengali: শ্রীনগর) is an upazila of Munshiganj District in the Dhaka Division, Bangladesh.

== Geography ==
Sreenagar is located at 23.5361°N 90.2917°E. It has 57,111 households and total area 203.00 km^{2}.

== Demographics ==
Religions in Sreenagar Upazila (2022)
Religion	Percent
Islam	90.32%
Hinduism	9.64%
Other or not stated	0.04%

According to the 2022 Bangladeshi census, Sreenagar Upazila had 72,897 households and a population of 293,905. 8.86% of the population were under 5 years of age. Sreenagar had a literacy rate (age 7 and over) of 79.97%: 80.97% for males and 79.08% for females, and a sex ratio of 91.32 males for every 100 females. 22,869 (7.78%) lived in urban areas.

According to the 2011 Census of Bangladesh, Sreenagar Upazila had 57,111 households and a population of 259,887 of which 54,839 (21.10%) were under 10 years of age. Sreenagar had a literacy rate (age 7 and over) of 57.27%, compared to the national average of 51.8%, and a sex ratio of 1040 females per 1000 males. 14,862 (5.72%) lived in urban areas.

As of the 1991 Bangladesh census, Sreenagar has a population of 205,797. Males constitute 49.88% of the population, and females 50.12%. This Upazila's eighteen up population is 99514. Sreenagar has an average literacy rate of 39.1% (7+ years), and the national average of 32.4% literate.

== Administration ==
Sreenagar Upazila is divided into 14 Union Parishads: Atpara, Baghra, Baraikhali, Bhagyakul, Birtara, Hasara, Kolapara, Kukutia, Patabhog, Rarikhal, Sholaghar, Shyamsiddhi, Sreenagar, and Tantar. The union parishads are subdivided into 102 mauzas and 147 villages.

=== Rarikhal ===
Jagadish Chandra Bose Memorial Museum at the JC Bose Complex, an estate of about 30 acres of greenery and ponds. The village is an ancestral bacgkround of notable persons which include Labanyaprabha Bose, Humayun Azad, and Nasima Khan.
