= A. F. Mujibur Rahman =

Abul Faiz Mujibur Rahman (born 23 September 1897, in Faridpur district of Bangladesh), was a jurist and the first Bengali Muslim Indian Civil Service (ICS) officer.

== Early life ==
Rahman attended school in Faridpur Zilla School and graduated from Dhaka College. He moved to Calcutta University and in 1920 achieved master's degree in pure mathematics with the highest score in the history of Calcutta University beating the previous record mark achieved by Sir Ashutosh Mukherjee. He then later applied to join the Indian Civil Service. He attended Balliol College, University of Oxford for probationary studies after which he joined in the judicial branch and also served as district judge in Dhaka for sometimes.

== Career ==
Rahman opposed the death penalty of revolutionary Ambika Chakrabarty for raiding Chittagong Armoury and the decision saved Chakrabarti's life. On request by Sher E Bangla A. K. Fazlul Huq, he took the responsibility of setting up the Land Acquisition Collectorate to ensure plots for hundreds and thousands of destitute Muslims living in Calcutta's slum area.

== Death and legacy ==
Rahman died of heart failure on 12 May 1945 at the age of 48.

In 1985 in remembrance of his father, Rezaur Rahman established a charitable trust called AF Mujibur Rahman Foundation. This foundation supports a number of institutions, especially the department of mathematics of Dhaka, Jagannath, Chittagong, Khulna and Rajshahi universities and awards the meritorious students of the department. It provide scholarships at the Institute of Business Administration of University of Dhaka, the Institute of Chartered Accountants of Bangladesh and Gono Bishawabidyalay. The foundation also supports the Bangladesh Mathematical Society to organise the National Mathematics Undergraduate Olympiad every year.

Funded by the AF Mujibur Rahman Foundation, the new eight storey mathematics building of University of Dhaka called AF Mujibur Rahman Ganit Bhaban was inaugurated in 2014.
