= Salma Islam =

Bangladeshi politician

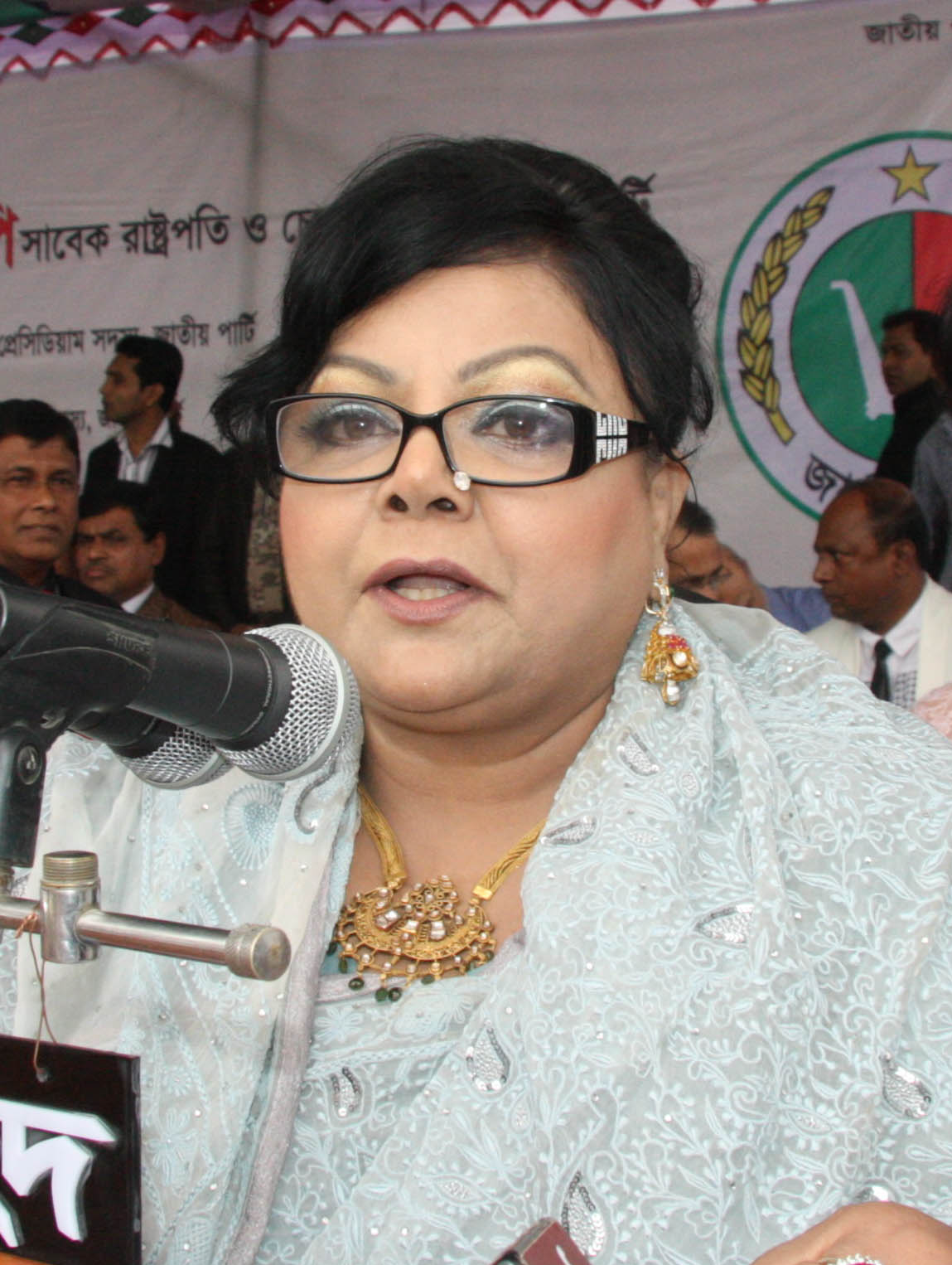
- Islam in 2007

Member of the Bangladesh Parliament for Reserved women's seat-49
- In office 28 February 2024 – 6 August 2024
- Preceded by: Afroza Haque Rina

Member of the Bangladesh Parliament for Reserved women's seat-44
- In office 30 January 2019 – 29 January 2024
- Preceded by: Noor-E-Hasna Lily Chowdhury
- Succeeded by: Faridun Nahar Laily

Member of the Bangladesh Parliament for Dhaka-1
- In office 9 January 2014 – 29 January 2019
- Preceded by: Abdul Mannan Khan
- Succeeded by: Salman F Rahman

Member of the Bangladesh Parliament for Reserved Women's Seat-45
- In office 25 January 2009 – 24 January 2014
- Succeeded by: Mahjabeen Morshed

Personal details
- Born: 1 January 1955 (age 71)
- Party: Jatiya Party (Ershad)
- Spouse: Nurul Islam Babul
- Occupation: Chairman at Jamuna Group

Salma Islam (born 1 January 1955) is a Bangladeshi businesswoman, politician, lawyer, and a former Jatiya Sangsad member. She was an MP of Bangladesh Jatiya Sangsad representing the Dhaka-1 constituency. She served as state minister of the Bangladesh government for Ministry of Women and Children Affairs. She is the Member of Presidium as well as current chair of Dhaka (district unit) of Jatiya Party (Ershad). She has been made the new chairman of Jamuna Group after the death of her husband and the conglomerate's founder chairman Nurul Islam Babul.

== Career ==
Islam served as the publisher and editor of Jugantor. The all-party interim government headed by Prime Minister Sheikh Hasina. President Abdul Hamid administered the oath at the presidential palace. She was taking oath as a member of the constituents of the Awami League-led grand alliance. In December 2013, She, along with six others ministers and advisors of Jatiya Party resigned following the directive of the party chief. She was elected to parliament from Dhaka-1 constituency in 2014 as a Jatiya Party candidate. In 2019, she was made the Jatiya Party's Dhaka district unit president.
