= Dohar Upazila =

Dohar দোহার
- Upazila
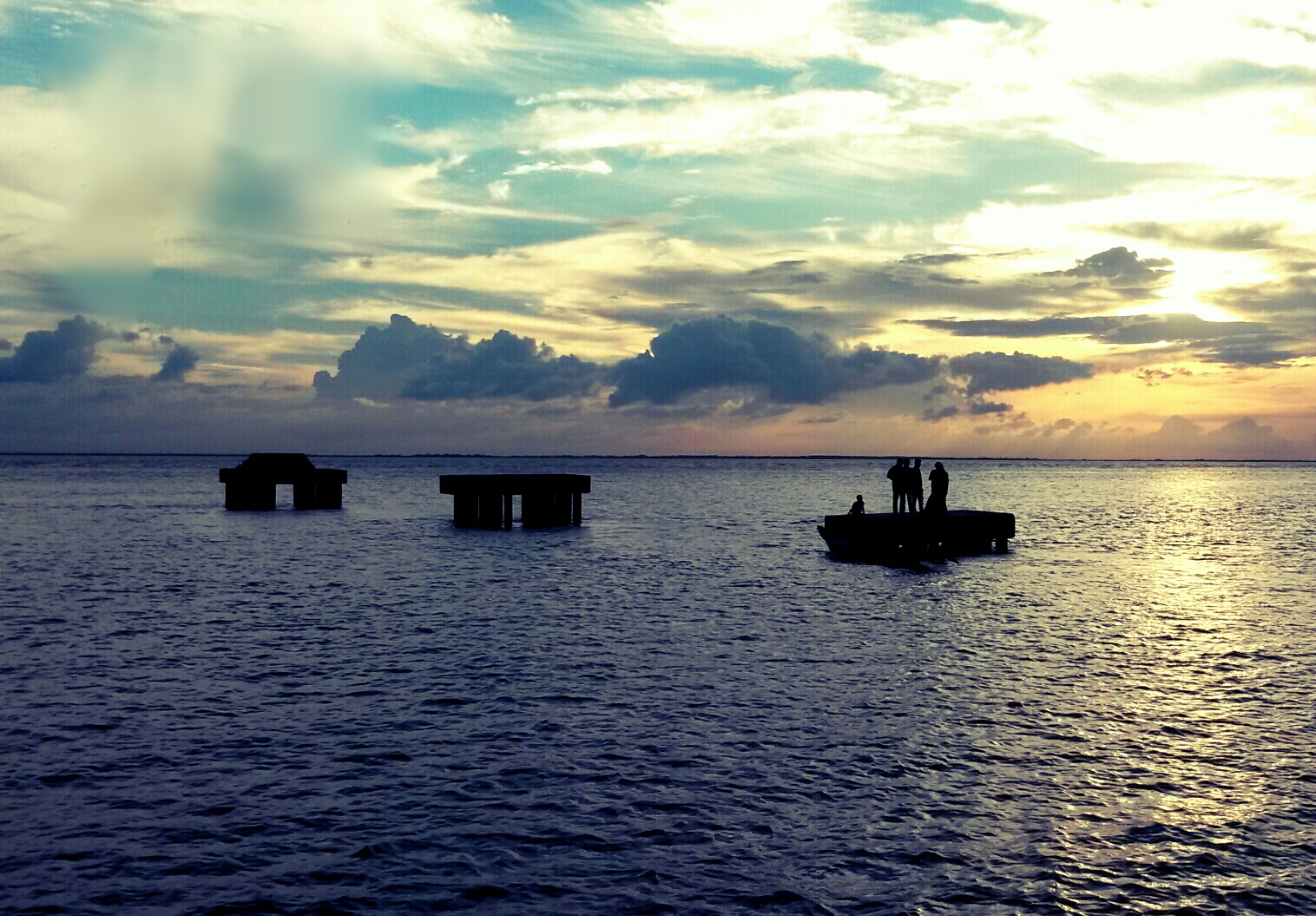
- Moinot Ghat, Dohar

- Coordinates: 23.5958°N 90.1222°E
- Country: Bangladesh
- Division: Dhaka
- District: Dhaka

Area
  - Total: 161.49 km^{2} (62.35 sq mi)

Population (2022)
  - Total: 250,114
  - Density: 1,548.8/km^{2} (4,011.3/sq mi)
- Time zone: UTC+6 (BST)
- Postal code: 1330
- Area code: 06223
- Website: Website of Dohar

Dohar (Bengali: দোহার) is an upazila of Dhaka District in the division of Dhaka, Bangladesh. The upazila is situated in the southernmost part of Dhaka District. The Padma River borders the southern part of the upazila.

Dohar Upazila mauza geocode map

== History ==
During the British period, farmers in this area were forced to cultivate nil (indigo) and joined the indigo rebellion. Mahatma Gandhi visited the area in 1940.

== Geography ==
Dohar is an upazila of Dhaka district is located at 23.5958°N 90.1222°E. It has 49,400 households and a total area of 161.49 km^{2}. One of the largest rivers of Bangladesh, the Padma, is situated in the southern, south central-western and south-western part of Dohar. This upazila is surrounded by Nawabganj on the north, Sreenagar on the east ,Harirampur, Char Bhadrasan upazilas and Padma River on the west and Sadarpur, Char Bhadrasan upazilas and Padma River on the south.

== Demographics ==
Religions in Dohar Upazila (2022)
Religion	Percent
Islam	96.10%
Hinduism	3.75%
Others or not stated	0.15%

According to the 2022 Bangladeshi census, Dohar Upazila had 61,577 households and a population of 250,114. 8.85% of the population were under 5 years of age. Dohar had a literacy rate (age 7 and over) of 79.24%: 79.47% for males and 79.04% for females, and a sex ratio of 85.46 males for every 100 females. 82,126 (32.84%) lived in urban areas.

According to the 2011 Census of Bangladesh, Dohar Upazila had 49,400 households and a population of 226,439. 51,306 (22.66%) were under 10 years of age. Dohar had a literacy rate (age 7 and over) of 57.5%, compared to the national average of 51.8%, and a sex ratio of 1115 females per 1000 males. 36,434 (16.09%) lived in urban areas.

As of the 2001 Bangladesh census, Dohar had an average literacy rate of 32.9% (7+ years) compared with the national average of 32.4% literacy. The rate of literacy is increasing nowadays.

== Points of interest ==
The sandy beach at Moinot Ghat, on the Padma River, is a day trip destination for Dhakaites.

== Administration ==
Dohar Upazila is divided into Dohar Municipality and eight union parishads: Bilaspur, Kushumhati, Mahmudpur, Muksudpur, Narisha, Nayabari, Roypara, and Sutarpara. The union parishads are subdivided into 91 mauzas and 133 villages.

Dohar Municipality is subdivided into 9 wards and 26 mahallas.
