= Nawabganj Upazila, Dhaka =

Nawabganj নবাবগঞ্জ
- Upazila
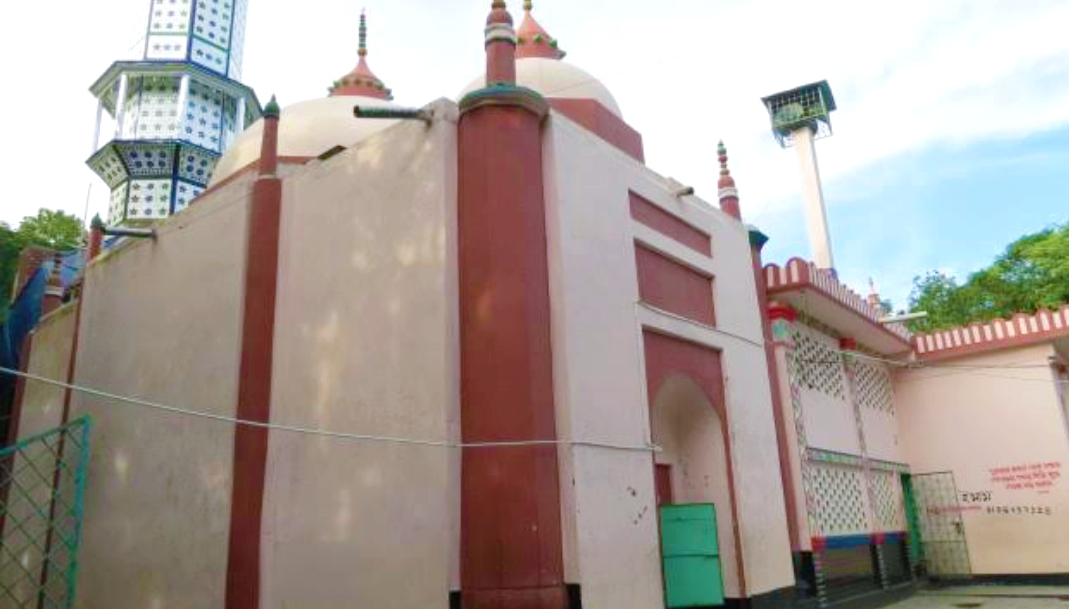
- Bhanga Masjid

- Coordinates: 23.6667°N 90.1667°E
- Country: Bangladesh
- Division: Dhaka
- District: Dhaka

Area
  - Total: 244.80 km^{2} (94.52 sq mi)

Population (2022)
  - Total: 348,807
  - Density: 1,424.9/km^{2} (3,690.4/sq mi)
- Time zone: UTC+6 (BST)
- Postal code: 1320
- Area code: 06225
- Website: website of Nawabganj

Nawabganj (Bengali: নবাবগঞ্জ) is an upazila of Dhaka District in the Dhaka Division, Bangladesh.

== Geography ==
Nawabganj is located at 23.6667°N 90.1667°E. It has 70,757 households and a total area 244.80 km^{2}.

Nawabganj is surrounded by Singair Upazila on the north, Dohar Upazila on the south, Keraniganj, ⁣⁣Sirajdikhan⁣⁣, and Sreenagar Upazilas on the east, and Harirampur and Manikganj Sadar Upazilas on the West.

== Demographics ==
According to the 2022 Bangladeshi census, Nawabganj Upazila had 90,694 households and a population of 348,807. 7.83% of the population were under 5 years of age. Nawabganj had a literacy rate (age 7 and over) of 79.27%: 80.65% for males and 78.09% for females, and a sex ratio of 86.96 males for every 100 females. 24,489 (7.02%) lived in urban areas.

Religions in Nawabganj Upazila (2022)
Religion	Percent
Islam	79.96%
Hinduism	18.75%
Christianity	1.29%

Population by religion in Union
Union	Muslim	Hindu	Others
Agla Union	16,340	2,840	5
Bahra Union	23,621	4,533	0
Baksnagar Union	17,854	4,764	271
Bandura Union	24,501	4,955	1543
Baruakhali Union	16,130	2,177	3
Churain Union	24,330	1,609	3
Galimpur Union	13,837	1,015	1
Jantrail Union	12,011	12,658	358
Joykrishnapur Union	14,695	4,066	113
Kailail Union	21,933	6,924	1
Kalakopa Union	21,767	2,400	10
Nayansree Union	20,144	7,502	2,184
Shikaripara Union	15,992	2,980	2
Sholla Union	35,033	7,674	6

🟩 Muslim majority 🟧 Hindu majority

According to the 2011 Census of Bangladesh, Nawabganj Upazila had 70,757 households and a population of 318,811. 66,367 (20.82%) were under 10 years of age. Nawabganj had a literacy rate (age 7 and over) of 57.8%, compared to the national average of 51.8%, and a sex ratio of 1135 females per 1000 males. 16,917 (5.31%) lived in urban areas.

As of the 1991 Bangladesh census, Nawabganj had a population of 269,189. Males constituted 49.31% of the population, and females 50.69%. 134,813 residents were over eighteen. Nawabganj had an average literacy rate of 34.5% (7+ years). For reference, the national average is 32.4%.

== Politics ==
Nawabganj Upazila is currently under the rule of the Interim Government.

Nawabganj Thana, now an Upazila, was established in 1974.

== Political parties ==
Many political parties are currently active in Nawabganj. The most popular parties include Bangladesh National Party, which runs as Nawabganj Upazila BNP; the Bangladesh Awami League, which runs as Nawabganj Upazila Awami League; and the Jatiyo Party, which runs as Nawabganj Upazila Jatiyo Party

== Politicians ==
A big number of politicians come from Nawabganj. The notable ones are:

- Abdul Mannan
- Moslem Uddin Khan
- Abdul Haleem Chowdhury
- Borhanuddin Khan
- Khandaker Abu Ashfaq
- Salma Islam
- Abdul Baten Mia
- Poniruzzaman Torun
- Muazzam Hossain
- Azizur Rahman Foku
- Noor Ali
- Barrister Nazrul Islam

== Administration ==
Nawabganj Upazila is divided into 14 union parishads: Agla, Bakshanagar, Bandura, Barrah, Baruakhali, Churain, Galimpur, Jantrail, Joykrishnapur, Kailail, Kalakopa, Nayansree, Shekaripara, and Sholla. The union parishads are subdivided into 190 mauzas and 342 villages.[5]

== See also ==
- Upazilas of Bangladesh
- Districts of Bangladesh
- Divisionsof Bangladesh
