= List of constituencies of the Jatiya Sangsad =

List of Parliamentary Constituencies of Bangladesh

The 300 constituencies

in 2013 reorganised Area

This is a list of 300 parliamentary constituencies currently represented in the Jatiya Sangsad, the unicameral national legislature of Bangladesh. Each constituency is represented by a single Member of Parliament. The Jatiya Sangsad of Bangladesh consists of 350 seats, of which 50 seats are reserved for women, who are elected by the 300 directly elected members on the basis of procedure of proportional representation in the Parliament through single transferable vote.

The Bangladesh Election Commission is made responsible to "delimit the constituencies for the purpose of elections to Parliament" by the Constitution of Bangladesh (chapter VII, article 119). It also says, "There shall be one electoral roll for each constituency for the purposes of elections to Parliament, and no special electoral roll shall be prepared so as to classify electors according to religion, race caste or sex" (article 121).

The current list, published by the Bangladesh Election Commission in 2018 as per the provisions of the Delimitation of Constituencies Ordinance, 1976 is as follows:

== Distribution of constituency across division and district ==
Division	Number of seats	District	Number of Constituency
Dhaka	71	Dhaka	20
Dhaka	71	Tangail	8
Dhaka	71	Gazipur	5
Dhaka	71	Narsingdi	5
Dhaka	71	Narayanganj	5
Dhaka	71	Kishoreganj	6
Dhaka	71	Faridpur	4
Dhaka	71	Manikganj	3
Dhaka	71	Munshiganj	3
Dhaka	71	Gopalganj	3
Dhaka	71	Madaripur	3
Dhaka	71	Shariatpur	3
Dhaka	71	Rajbari	2
Rajshahi	39	Bogra	7
Rajshahi	39	Naogaon	6
Rajshahi	39	Rajshahi	6
Rajshahi	39	Sirajganj	6
Rajshahi	39	Pabna	5
Rajshahi	39	Natore	4
Rajshahi	39	Chapai Nawabganj	3
Rajshahi	39	Joypurhat	2
Khulna	35	Jessore	6
Khulna	35	Khulna	6
Khulna	35	Kushtia	4
Khulna	35	Jhenaidah	4
Khulna	35	Bagerhat	4
Khulna	35	Satkhira	4
Khulna	35	Meherpur	2
Khulna	35	Chuadanga	2
Khulna	35	Magura	2
Khulna	35	Narail	2
Barisal	21	Barisal	6
Barisal	21	Patuakhali	4
Barisal	21	Bhola	4
Barisal	21	Pirojpur	3
Barisal	21	Barguna	2
Barisal	21	Jhalokati	2
Rangpur	33	Dinajpur	6
Rangpur	33	Rangpur	6
Rangpur	33	Panchagarh	2
Rangpur	33	Gaibandha	5
Rangpur	33	Kurigram	4
Rangpur	33	Nilphamari	4
Rangpur	33	Thakurgaon	3
Rangpur	33	Lalmonirhat	3
Mymensingh	24	Mymensingh	11
Mymensingh	24	Jamalpur	5
Mymensingh	24	Netrokona	5
Mymensingh	24	Sherpur	3
Sylhet	19	Sylhet	6
Sylhet	19	Sunamganj	5
Sylhet	19	Moulvibazar	4
Sylhet	19	Habiganj	4
Chittagong	58	Chittagong	16
Chittagong	58	Comilla	11
Chittagong	58	Brahmanbaria	6
Chittagong	58	Noakhali	6
Chittagong	58	Chandpur	5
Chittagong	58	Lakshmipur	4
Chittagong	58	Cox's Bazar	4
Chittagong	58	Feni	3
Chittagong	58	Khagrachari	1
Chittagong	58	Rangamati	1
Chittagong	58	Bandarban	1

== Rangpur Division ==
Districts	Constituency	Name	Boundary
Panchagarh District	1	Panchagarh-1	Panchagarh Sadar Upazila, Tetulia Upazila and Atwari Upazila
Panchagarh District	2	Panchagarh-2	Debiganj Upazila and Boda Upazila
Thakurgaon District	3	Thakurgaon-1	Thakurgaon Sadar Upazila, Ruhia Upazila and Bhully Upazila
Thakurgaon District	4	Thakurgaon-2	Baliadangi Upazila, Haripur Upazila and two union parishads of Ranisankail Upazila: Dharmaghar, and Kashipur
Thakurgaon District	5	Thakurgaon-3	Pirganj Upazila and Ranisankail Upazila excluding Dharmagarh Union, Kashipur Union
Dinajpur District	6	Dinajpur-1	Birganj Upazila and Kaharole Upazila
Dinajpur District	7	Dinajpur-2	Biral Upazila and Bochaganj Upazila
Dinajpur District	8	Dinajpur-3	Dinajpur Sadar Upazila
Dinajpur District	9	Dinajpur-4	Chirirbandar Upazila and Khansama Upazila
Dinajpur District	10	Dinajpur-5	Fulbari Upazila and Parbatipur Upazila
Dinajpur District	11	Dinajpur-6	Nawabganj Upazila, Birampur Upazila, Hakimpur Upazila and Ghoraghat Upazila
Nilphamari District	12	Nilphamari-1	Dimla Upazila and Domar Upazila
Nilphamari District	13	Nilphamari-2	Nilphamari Sadar Upazila
Nilphamari District	14	Nilphamari-3	Jaldhaka Upazila
Nilphamari District	15	Nilphamari-4	Saidpur Upazila Kishoreganj Upazila
Lalmonirhat District	16	Lalmonirhat-1	Patgram Upazila and Hatibandha Upazila
Lalmonirhat District	17	Lalmonirhat-2	Aditmari Upazila and Kaliganj Upazila
Lalmonirhat District	18	Lalmonirhat-3	Lalmonirhat Sadar Upazila
Rangpur District	19	Rangpur-1	Gangachhara Upazila and Wards 1-8 of Rangpur City Corporation
Rangpur District	20	Rangpur-2	Badarganj Upazila and Taraganj Upazila
Rangpur District	21	Rangpur-3	Rangpur Sadar Upazila and Wards 9-33 of Rangpur City Corporation
Rangpur District	22	Rangpur-4	Kaunia Upazila and Pirgachha Upazila
Rangpur District	23	Rangpur-5	Mithapukur Upazila
Rangpur District	24	Rangpur-6	Pirganj Upazila
Kurigram District	25	Kurigram-1	Bhurungamari Upazila and Nageshwari Upazila
Kurigram District	26	Kurigram-2	Kurigram Sadar Upazila, Rajarhat Upazila and Phulbari Upazila, Kurigram
Kurigram District	27	Kurigram-3	part of Ulipur Upazila and part of Chilmari Upazila
Kurigram District	28	Kurigram-4	Raomari Upazila, Char Rajibpur Upazila, part of Chilmari Upazila and part of Ulipur Upazila
Gaibandha District	29	Gaibandha-1	Sundarganj Upazila
Gaibandha District	30	Gaibandha-2	Gaibandha Sadar Upazila
Gaibandha District	31	Gaibandha-3	Palashbari Upazila and Sadullapur Upazila
Gaibandha District	32	Gaibandha-4	Gobindaganj Upazila
Gaibandha District	33	Gaibandha-5	Sughatta Upazila and Phulchhari Upazila

== Rajshahi Division ==
Districts	Constituency	Name	Upazilas
Joypurhat District	34	Joypurhat-1	Joypurhat Sadar Upazila and Panchbibi Upazila
Joypurhat District	35	Joypurhat-2	Akkelpur Upazila, Kalai Upazila and Khetlal Upazila
Bogra District	36	Bogra-1	Sariakandi Upazila and Sonatala Upazila
Bogra District	37	Bogra-2	Shibganj Upazila and Mokamtola Upazila
Bogra District	38	Bogra-3	Adamdighi Upazila and Dhupchanchia Upazila
Bogra District	39	Bogra-4	Kahaloo Upazila and Nandigram Upazila
Bogra District	40	Bogra-5	Sherpur Upazila and Dhunat
Bogra District	41	Bogra-6	Bogra Sadar Upazila
Bogra District	42	Bogra-7	Gabtali Upazila and Shajahanpur Upazila
Chapai Nawabganj District	43	Chapai Nawabganj-1	Shibganj Upazila
Chapai Nawabganj District	44	Chapai Nawabganj-2	Bholahat Upazila, Gomastapur Upazila and Nachole Upazila
Chapai Nawabganj District	45	Chapai Nawabganj-3	Chapai Nawabganj Sadar Upazila
Naogaon District	46	Naogaon-1	Sapahar Upazila, Porsha Upazila and Niamatpur Upazila
Naogaon District	47	Naogaon-2	Patnitala Upazila and Dhamoirhat Upazila
Naogaon District	48	Naogaon-3	Mohadevpur Upazila and Badalgachhi Upazila
Naogaon District	49	Naogaon-4	Manda Upazila
Naogaon District	50	Naogaon-5	Naogaon Sadar Upazila
Naogaon District	51	Naogaon-6	Raninagar Upazila and Atrai Upazila
Rajshahi District	52	Rajshahi-1	Tanore Upazila and Godagari Upazila
Rajshahi District	53	Rajshahi-2	Rajshahi City Corporation
Rajshahi District	54	Rajshahi-3	Mohanpur Upazila and Paba Upazila
Rajshahi District	55	Rajshahi-4	Bagmara Upazila
Rajshahi District	56	Rajshahi-5	Durgapur Upazila and Puthia Upazila
Rajshahi District	57	Rajshahi-6	Charghat Upazila and Bagha Upazila
Natore District	58	Natore-1	Bagatipara Upazila and Lalpur Upazila
Natore District	59	Natore-2	Natore Sadar Upazila and Naldanga Upazila
Natore District	60	Natore-3	Singra Upazila
Natore District	61	Natore-4	Baraigram Upazila and Gurudaspur Upazila
Sirajganj District	62	Sirajganj-1	Kazipur Upazila and five union parishads of Sirajganj Sadar Upazila: Bagbati, Bohuli, Mechhra, Ratankandi and Chhongachha
Sirajganj District	63	Sirajganj-2	Kamarkhanda Upazila, Sirajganj Municipality and five union parishads of Sirajganj Sadar Upazila: Kalia Haripur, Kawakhola, Khokshabari, Soydabad and Shialkol
Sirajganj District	64	Sirajganj-3	Raiganj Upazila and Tarash Upazila
Sirajganj District	65	Sirajganj-4	Ullahpara Upazila
Sirajganj District	66	Sirajganj-5	Belkuchi Upazila and Chauhali Upazila
Sirajganj District	67	Sirajganj-6	Shahjadpur Upazila
Pabna District	68	Pabna-1	Santhia Upazila, Bera Municipality and four union parishads of Bera Upazila: Chakla, Haturia Nakalia, Kytola and Nutan Bharenga
Pabna District	69	Pabna-2	Sujanagar Upazila and the five southernmost union parishads of Bera Upazila: Dhalar Char, Jatsakhni, Masundia, Puran Bharenga and Ruppur
Pabna District	70	Pabna-3	Bhangura Upazila, Chatmohar Upazila and Faridpur Upazila
Pabna District	71	Pabna-4	Atgharia Upazila and Ishwardi Upazila
Pabna District	72	Pabna-5	Pabna Sadar Upazila

== Khulna Division ==
Districts	Constituency	Name	Upazilas
Meherpur District	73	Meherpur-1	Meherpur Sadar Upazila and Mujibnagar Upazila
Meherpur District	74	Meherpur-2	Gangni Upazila
Kushtia District	75	Kushtia-1	Daulatpur Upazila
Kushtia District	76	Kushtia-2	Mirpur Upazila and Bheramara Upazila
Kushtia District	77	Kushtia-3	Kushtia Sadar Upazila
Kushtia District	78	Kushtia-4	Khoksa Upazila and Kumarkhali Upazila
Chuadanga District	79	Chuadanga-1	Alamdanga Upazila, and all but two unions of Chuadanga Sadar Upazila: Begumpur and Titudaha
Chuadanga District	80	Chuadanga-2	Two unions of Chuadanga Sadar Upazila: Begumpur and Titudaha, Damurhuda Upazila and Jibannagar Upazila
Jhenaidah District	81	Jhenaidah-1	Shailkupa Upazila
Jhenaidah District	82	Jhenaidah-2	Harinakunda Upazila and all but four union parishads of Jhenaidah Sadar Upazila: Fursandi, Ghorshal, Moharajpur, and Naldanga
Jhenaidah District	83	Jhenaidah-3	Maheshpur Upazila, and Kotchandpur Upazila
Jhenaidah District	84	Jhenaidah-4	Kaliganj Upazila and four union parishads of Jhenaidah Sadar Upazila: Fursandi, Ghorshal, Moharajpur, and Naldanga
Jessore District	85	Jessore-1	Sharsha Upazila
Jessore District	86	Jessore-2	Chaugachha Upazila, and Jhikargachha Upazila
Jessore District	87	Jessore-3	All union parishads of Jessore Sadar Upazila except Basundia
Jessore District	88	Jessore-4	Bagherpara Upazila, Abhaynagar Upazila and one union parishad of Jessore Sadar Upazila: Basundia
Jessore District	89	Jessore-5	Manirampur Upazila
Jessore District	90	Jessore-6	Keshabpur Upazila
Magura District	91	Magura-1	Sreepur Upazila, Magura Sadar Upazila (not include Shotrujitpur Union, Gopalgram Union, Kuciamora Union, Berilpur Union).
Magura District	92	Magura-2	Mohammadpur Upazila, Shatrujitpur Union, Gopalgram Union, Kuciamora Union, Berilpur Union
Narail District	93	Narail-1	Kalia Upazila and five union parishads of Narail Sadar Upazila: Bhadrabila, Bichhali, Kalora, Shaikhati and Singasolpur
Narail District	94	Narail-2	Lohagara Upazila and eight union parishads of Narail Sadar Upazila:Auria, Banshgram, Chandibarpur, Habakhali, Maij Para, Mulia, Sahabad and Tularampur
Bagerhat District	95	Bagerhat-1	Fakirhat Upazilla, Mollahat Upazilla, and Chitalmari Upazilla
Bagerhat District	96	Bagerhat-2	Bagerhat Sadar Upazilla and Kachua Upazilla
Bagerhat District	97	Bagerhat-3	Mongla Upazila, Rampal Upazila and Port of Mongla
Bagerhat District	98	Bagerhat-4	Morrelganj Upazila and Sarankhola Upazila
Khulna District	99	Khulna-1	Dacope Upazila and Batiaghata Upazila
Khulna District	100	Khulna-2	16 wards of Khulna City Corporation
Khulna District	101	Khulna-3	15 wards of Khulna City Corporation and two Union Parishad of Dighalia Upazila
Khulna District	102	Khulna-4	Rupsha Upazila, Terokhada Upazila, Barakpur, Dighalia, Gazirhat and Shenhati union parishads of Dighalia Upazila.
Khulna District	103	Khulna-5	Dumuria Upazila, Phultala Upazila, Khan Jahan Ali Thana, Gilatala Cantonment, and Atra Gilatala Union
Khulna District	104	Khulna-6	Koyra Upazila and Paikgachha Upazila
Satkhira District	105	Satkhira-1	Kalaroa Upazila and Tala Upazila
Satkhira District	106	Satkhira-2	Satkhira Sadar Upazila
Satkhira District	107	Satkhira-3	Assasuni, Debhata upazilas and the four northernmost union parishads of Kaliganj Upazila: Bhara Simla, Champaphul, Nalta and Tarali
Satkhira District	108	Satkhira-4	Shyamnagar Upazila and all but the four northernmost union parishads of Kaliganj Upazila: Bhara Simla, Champaphul, Nalta, and Tarali

== Barisal Division ==
Districts	Constituency	Name	Upazilas	Total Voters in 2018
Barguna District	109	Barguna-1	Barguna Sadar Upazila, Amtali Upazila and Taltali Upazila	414,402
Barguna District	110	Barguna-2	Bamna Upazila, Patharghata Upazila and Betagi Upazila	268,366
Patuakhali District	111	Patuakhali-1	Patuakhali Sadar Upazila, Mirzaganj Upazila and Dumki Upazila	393,474
Patuakhali District	112	Patuakhali-2	Bauphal Upazila	251,873
Patuakhali District	113	Patuakhali-3	Dashmina Upazila, Galachipa Upazila	298,675
Patuakhali District	114	Patuakhali-4	Kalapara Upazila, Rangabali Upazila	249,035
Bhola District	115	Bhola-1	Bhola Sadar Upazila	310,048
Bhola District	116	Bhola-2	Burhanuddin Upazila and Daulatkhan Upazila	297,221
Bhola District	117	Bhola-3	Lalmohan Upazila and Tazumuddin Upazila	293,604
Bhola District	118	Bhola-4	Char Fasson Upazila and Manpura Upazila	372,948
Barisal District	119	Barisal-1	Agailjhara Upazila and Gaurnadi Upazila	258,034
Barisal District	120	Barisal-2	Banaripara Upazila and Wazirpur Upazila	302,644
Barisal District	121	Barisal-3	Babuganj Upazila and Muladi Upazila	254,024
Barisal District	122	Barisal-4	Hizla Upazila and Mehendiganj Upazila	323,573
Barisal District	123	Barisal-5	Barishal City Corporation and Barisal Sadar Upazila	397,514
Barisal District	124	Barisal-6	Bakerganj Upazila	245,840
Jhalokati District	125	Jhalokati-1	Rajapur Upazila and Kathalia Upazila	178,888
Jhalokati District	126	Jhalokati-2	Jhalokati Sadar Upazila and Nalchity Upazila	290,404
Pirojpur District	127	Pirojpur-1	Pirojpur Sadar Upazila, Nazirpur Upazila and Nesarabad (Swarupkati) Upazila	419,106
Pirojpur District	128	Pirojpur-2	Bhandaria Upazila, Kawkhali Upazila, Pirojpur and Zianagar Upazila	220,535
Pirojpur District	129	Pirojpur-3	Mathbaria Upazila	189,862

== Mymensingh Division ==
District	Constituency	Name	Extent
Jamalpur District	138	Jamalpur-1	Baksiganj Upazila and Dewanganj Upazila
Jamalpur District	139	Jamalpur-2	Islampur Upazila
Jamalpur District	140	Jamalpur-3	Madarganj Upazila and Melandaha Upazila
Jamalpur District	141	Jamalpur-4	Sarishabari Upazila
Jamalpur District	142	Jamalpur-5	Jamalpur Sadar Upazila
Sherpur District	143	Sherpur-1	Sherpur Sadar Upazila
Sherpur District	144	Sherpur-2	Nakla Upazila and Nalitabari Upazila
Sherpur District	145	Sherpur-3	Sreebardi Upazila and Jhenaigati Upazila
Mymensingh District	146	Mymensingh-1	Haluaghat Upazila and Dhobaura Upazila
Mymensingh District	147	Mymensingh-2	Phulpur Upazila and Tarakanda Upazila
Mymensingh District	148	Mymensingh-3	Gauripur Upazila
Mymensingh District	149	Mymensingh-4	Mymensingh Sadar Upazila and Mymensingh City Corporation
Mymensingh District	150	Mymensingh-5	Muktagachha Upazila
Mymensingh District	151	Mymensingh-6	Fulbaria Upazila
Mymensingh District	152	Mymensingh-7	Trishal Upazila
Mymensingh District	153	Mymensingh-8	Ishwarganj Upazila
Mymensingh District	154	Mymensingh-9	Nandail Upazila
Mymensingh District	155	Mymensingh-10	Gaffargaon Upazila and South Gafargaon Upazila
Mymensingh District	156	Mymensingh-11	Bhaluka Upazila
Netrokona District	157	Netrokona-1	Kalmakanda Upazila and Durgapur Upazila
Netrokona District	158	Netrokona-2	Netrokona Sadar Upazila and Barhatta Upazila
Netrokona District	159	Netrokona-3	Atpara Upazila and Kendua Upazila
Netrokona District	160	Netrokona-4	Khaliajuri Upazila, Madan Upazila and Mohanganj Upazila
Netrokona District	161	Netrokona-5	Purbadhala Upazila

== Dhaka Division ==
Districts	Constituency	Name	Upazilas	Total Voters in 2018
Tangail District	130	Tangail-1	Dhanbari Upazila & Madhupur Upazila	364,991
Tangail District	131	Tangail-2	Bhuapur Upazila & Gopalpur Upazila	348,670
Tangail District	132	Tangail-3	Ghatail Upazila	318,546
Tangail District	133	Tangail-4	Kalihati Upazila	311,088
Tangail District	134	Tangail-5	Tangail Sadar Upazila	380,338
Tangail District	135	Tangail-6	Delduar Upazila and Nagarpur Upazila.	390,446
Tangail District	136	Tangail-7	Mirzapur Upazila	322,673
Tangail District	137	Tangail-8	Basail Upazila & Sakhipur Upazila	346,646
Kishoreganj District	162	Kishoreganj-1	Hossainpur Upazila and Kishoreganj Sadar Upazila	430,193
Kishoreganj District	163	Kishoreganj-2	Katiadi Upazila and Pakundia Upazila	417,420
Kishoreganj District	164	Kishoreganj-3	Tarail Upazila and Karimganj Upazila	347,209
Kishoreganj District	165	Kishoreganj-4	Austagram Upazila, Itna Upazila and Mithamain Upazila	320,246
Kishoreganj District	166	Kishoreganj-5	Bajitpur Upazila and Nikli Upazila	278,708
Kishoreganj District	167	Kishoreganj-6	Bhairab Upazila and Kuliarchar Upazila	332,651
Manikganj District	168	Manikganj-1	Daulatpur, Ghior Upazila and Shivalaya Upazila	384,610
Manikganj District	169	Manikganj-2	Harirampur Upazila, Singair Upazila and Three union from Manikganj Sadar Upazila	406,245
Manikganj District	170	Manikganj-3	Saturia Upazila and all but three Union of Manikganj Sadar Upazila	319,722
Munshiganj District	171	Munshiganj-1	Sirajdikhan Upazila & Sreenagar Upazila	440,532
Munshiganj District	172	Munshiganj-2	Louhajang Upazila & Tongibari Upazila	305,987
Munshiganj District	173	Munshiganj-3	Munshiganj Sadar Upazila & Gazaria Upazila	416,681
Dhaka District	174	Dhaka-1	Dohar Upazila and Nawabganj Upazila	440,287
Dhaka District	175	Dhaka-2	3 wards (55-57) of DSCC, 7 unions of Keraniganj Upazila and 3 unions of Savar Upazila.	494,346
Dhaka District	176	Dhaka-3	5 unions of Keraniganj Upazila	311,617
Dhaka District	177	Dhaka-4	5 wards(47, 51-54) of DSCC and 1 unions of Shyampur Thana	245,813
Dhaka District	178	Dhaka-5	14 wards (48-50, 60-70) of DSCC and 4 union parishads.	450,608
Dhaka District	179	Dhaka-6	11 wards (34, 37-46) of DSCC	269,315
Dhaka District	180	Dhaka-7	13 wards (23-36) of DSCC	328,181
Dhaka District	181	Dhaka-8	9 wards (8-13, 19-21) of DSCC	264,664
Dhaka District	182	Dhaka-9	7 wards (1-7) of DSCC and 3 union parishads.	425,501
Dhaka District	183	Dhaka-10	6 wards (14-18, 22) of DSCC	313,744
Dhaka District	184	Dhaka-11	9 wards of DNCC.	415,455
Dhaka District	185	Dhaka-12	6 wards of DNCC	339,840
Dhaka District	186	Dhaka-13	7 wards of DNCC	372,775
Dhaka District	187	Dhaka-14	6 wards of DNCC and 1 union of Savar Upazila: Kaundia	406,444
Dhaka District	188	Dhaka-15	4 wards of DNCC	340,480
Dhaka District	189	Dhaka-16	4 wards of DNCC	374,154
Dhaka District	190	Dhaka-17	4 wards of DNCC and Dhaka Cantonment	313,875
Dhaka District	191	Dhaka-18	14 wards of DNCC	555,773
Dhaka District	192	Dhaka-19	Savar Upazila except Kaundia Union	746,947
Dhaka District	193	Dhaka-20	Dhamrai Upazila	320,223
Gazipur District	194	Gazipur-1	Kaliakair Upazila and Gazipur City Corporation ward 1-18.	664,519
Gazipur District	195	Gazipur-2	Rajendrapur Cantonment and Gazipur City Corporation ward 19-32.	745,734
Gazipur District	196	Gazipur-3	Sreepur Upazila, Gazipur and three Union of Gazipur Sadar Upazila	436,667
Gazipur District	197	Gazipur-4	Kapasia Upazila	267,394
Gazipur District	198	Gazipur-5	Kaliganj Upazila, One union from Gazipur Sadar Upazila and Gazipur City Corporation Ward 40-42	302,555
Narsingdi District	199	Narsingdi-1	part of Narsingdi Sadar Upazila	380,095
Narsingdi District	200	Narsingdi-2	Palash Upazila and part of Narsingdi Sadar Upazila	234,373
Narsingdi District	201	Narsingdi-3	Shibpur Upazila	224,610
Narsingdi District	202	Narsingdi-4	Monohardi Upazila and Belabo Upazila	341,742
Narsingdi District	203	Narsingdi-5	Raipura Upazila	371,536
Narayanganj District	204	Narayanganj-1	Rupganj Upazila	349,791
Narayanganj District	205	Narayanganj-2	Araihazar Upazila	283,867
Narayanganj District	206	Narayanganj-3	Sonargaon Upazila	303,872
Narayanganj District	207	Narayanganj-4	Fatullah Thana and Siddhirganj Thana	651,099
Narayanganj District	208	Narayanganj-5	Part of Narayanganj Sadar Upazila and Bandar Upazila	445,616
Rajbari District	209	Rajbari-1	Rajbari Sadar Upazila and Goalanda Upazila	346,619
Rajbari District	210	Rajbari-2	Baliakandi Upazila and Pangsha Upazila	462,473
Faridpur District	211	Faridpur-1	Alfadanga Upazila, Boalmari Upazila & Madhukhali Upazila	410,501
Faridpur District	212	Faridpur-2	Nagarkanda Upazila, Saltha Upazila and One union from Sadarpur Upazila	287,370
Faridpur District	213	Faridpur-3	Faridpur Sadar Upazila	353,469
Faridpur District	214	Faridpur-4	Bhanga Upazila, Charbhadrasan Upazila and all but one of Sadarpur Upazila	370,695
Gopalganj District	215	Gopalganj-1	Muksudpur Upazila and Seven Union from Kashiani Upazila	321,450
Gopalganj District	216	Gopalganj-2	Gopalganj Sadar Upazila and Seven Union from Kashiani Upazila	311,822
Gopalganj District	217	Gopalganj-3	Kotalipara Upazila & Tungipara Upazila	246,685
Madaripur District	218	Madaripur-1	Shibchar Upazila	245,095
Madaripur District	219	Madaripur-2	Rajoir Upazila Madaripur Municipality and ten union from Madaripur Sadar Upazila	347,230
Madaripur District	220	Madaripur-3	Kalkini Upazila and five union of Madaripur Sadar Upazila	297,955
Shariatpur District	221	Shariatpur-1	Shariatpur Sadar Upazila and Zajira Upazila	296,018
Shariatpur District	222	Shariatpur-2	Naria Upazila and Shakhipur Thana	310,343
Shariatpur District	223	Shariatpur-3	Gosairhat Upazila, Damudya Upazila, Bhedarganj Thana	255,295

== Sylhet Division ==
District	Constituency	Name	Extent
Sunamganj District	224	Sunamganj-1	Dharampasha Upazila, Tahirpur Upazila, Jamalganj Upazila and Madhyanagar Upazila
Sunamganj District	225	Sunamganj-2	Derai Upazila and Shalla Upazila
Sunamganj District	226	Sunamganj-3	Jagannathpur Upazila and Shantiganj Upazila
Sunamganj District	227	Sunamganj-4	Bishwamvarpur Upazila and Sunamganj Sadar Upazila
Sunamganj District	228	Sunamganj-5	Chhatak Upazila and Dowarabazar Upazila
Sylhet District	229	Sylhet-1	36 wards of SCC and Sylhet Sadar Upazila
Sylhet District	230	Sylhet-2	Bishwanath Upazila, Osmani Nagar Upazila and Balaganj Upazila
Sylhet District	231	Sylhet-3	6 wards of SCC, Dakshin Surma Upazila and Fenchuganj Upazila
Sylhet District	232	Sylhet-4	Gowainghat Upazila, Jaintiapur Upazila and Companiganj Upazila
Sylhet District	233	Sylhet-5	Kanaighat Upazila and Zakiganj Upazila
Sylhet District	234	Sylhet-6	Beanibazar Upazila and Golapganj Upazila
Moulvibazar District	235	Moulvibazar-1	Barlekha Upazila and Juri Upazila
Moulvibazar District	236	Moulvibazar-2	Kulaura Upazila
Moulvibazar District	237	Moulvibazar-3	Moulvibazar Sadar Upazila and Rajnagar Upazila
Moulvibazar District	238	Moulvibazar-4	Sreemangal Upazila and Kamalganj Upazila
Habiganj District	239	Habiganj-1	Nabiganj Upazila and Bahubal Upazila
Habiganj District	240	Habiganj-2	Ajmiriganj Upazila and Baniyachong Upazila
Habiganj District	241	Habiganj-3	Habiganj Sadar Upazila and Lakhai Upazila
Habiganj District	242	Habiganj-4	Chunarughat Upazila and Madhabpur Upazila

== Chittagong Division ==
District	Constituency	Name	Extent
Brahmanbaria District	243	Brahmanbaria-1	Nasirnagar Upazila
Brahmanbaria District	244	Brahmanbaria-2	Ashuganj Upazila and Sarail Upazila
Brahmanbaria District	245	Brahmanbaria-3	Brahmanbaria Sadar Upazila and Bijoynagar Upazila
Brahmanbaria District	246	Brahmanbaria-4	Akhaura Upazila and Kasba Upazila
Brahmanbaria District	247	Brahmanbaria-5	Nabinagar Upazila
Brahmanbaria District	248	Brahmanbaria-6	Bancharampur Upazila and part of Nabinagar Upazila
Comilla District	249	Comilla-1	Daudkandi Upazila and Meghna Upazila
Comilla District	250	Comilla-2	Homna Upazila and Titas Upazila
Comilla District	251	Comilla-3	Muradnagar Upazila and Bangra Upazila
Comilla District	252	Comilla-4	Debidwar Upazila
Comilla District	253	Comilla-5	Brahmanpara Upazila and Burichang Upazila
Comilla District	254	Comilla-6	Comilla City Corporation, Comilla Adarsha Sadar Upazila, Comilla Sadar Dakshin Upazila and Comilla Cantonment.
Comilla District	255	Comilla-7	Chandina Upazila
Comilla District	256	Comilla-8	Barura Upazila
Comilla District	257	Comilla-9	Laksham and Monohorgonj
Comilla District	258	Comilla-10	Lalmai Upazilla and Nangalkot Upazilla
Comilla District	259	Comilla-11	Chauddagram Upazila
Chandpur District	260	Chandpur-1	Kachua Upazila
Chandpur District	261	Chandpur-2	Matlab Uttar Upazila and Matlab Dakshin Upazila
Chandpur District	262	Chandpur-3	Chandpur Sadar Upazila and Haimchar Upazila
Chandpur District	263	Chandpur-4	Faridganj Upazila
Chandpur District	264	Chandpur-5	Haziganj Upazila and Shahrasti Upazila
Feni District	265	Feni-1	Parshuram Upazila, Chhagalnaiya Upazila and Fulgazi Upazila
Feni District	266	Feni-2	Feni Sadar Upazila
Feni District	267	Feni-3	Sonagazi Upazila and Daganbhuiyan Upazila
Noakhali District	268	Noakhali-1	Chatkhil Upazila, Sonaimuri Upazila and four union parishads of Sonaimuri Upazila
Noakhali District	269	Noakhali-2	Senbagh Upazila and three union parishads of Sonaimuri Upazila
Noakhali District	270	Noakhali-3	Begumganj Upazila
Noakhali District	271	Noakhali-4	Subarnachar Upazila and Noakhali Sadar Upazila
Noakhali District	272	Noakhali-5	Companiganj Upazila and Kabirhat Upazila
Noakhali District	273	Noakhali-6	Hatiya Upazila
Lakshmipur District	274	Lakshmipur-1	Ramganj Upazila
Lakshmipur District	275	Lakshmipur-2	Raipur Upazila and seven union parishads of Lakshmipur Sadar Upazila and Basikpur Union of Chandraganj Upazila
Lakshmipur District	276	Lakshmipur-3	Other unions Lakshmipur Sadar Upazila and Chandraganj Upazila
Lakshmipur District	277	Lakshmipur-4	Kamalnagar Upazila and Ramgati Upazila.
Chittagong District	278	Chittagong-1	Mirsharai Upazila
Chittagong District	279	Chittagong-2	Fatikchhari Upazila
Chittagong District	280	Chittagong-3	Sandwip Upazila
Chittagong District	281	Chittagong-4	Sitakunda Upazila and 2 wards of Chattogram City Corporation
Chittagong District	282	Chittagong-5	Hathazari Upazila and 2 wards of Chattogram City Corporation
Chittagong District	283	Chittagong-6	Raozan Upazila
Chittagong District	284	Chittagong-7	Rangunia Upazila and one Union Parishad of Boalkhali Upazila
Chittagong District	285	Chittagong-8	5 wards of Chattogram City Corporation and Boalkhali Upazila.
Chittagong District	286	Chittagong-9	14 wards of Chattogram City Corporation.
Chittagong District	287	Chittagong-10	8 wards of Chattogram City Corporation.
Chittagong District	288	Chittagong-11	10 wards of Chattogram City Corporation.
Chittagong District	289	Chittagong-12	Patiya Upazila
Chittagong District	290	Chittagong-13	Anwara Upazila and part of Patiya Upazila
Chittagong District	291	Chittagong-14	Chandanaish Upazila and six union parishads of Satkania Upazila
Chittagong District	292	Chittagong-15	Lohagara Upazila and six union parishads of Satkania Upazila
Chittagong District	293	Chittagong-16	Banshkhali Upazila
Cox's Bazar District	294	Cox's Bazar-1	Chakaria Upazila, Matamuhuri Upazila and Pekua Upazila
Cox's Bazar District	295	Cox's Bazar-2	Kutubdia Upazila and Maheshkhali Upazila
Cox's Bazar District	296	Cox's Bazar-3	Cox's Bazar Sadar Upazila, Eidgaon Upazila and Ramu Upazila
Cox's Bazar District	297	Cox's Bazar-4	Ukhia Upazila and Teknaf Upazila
Khagrachari District	298	Khagrachari	Khagrachari District
Rangamati District	299	Rangamati	Rangamati District
Bandarban District	300	Bandarban	Bandarban District
