= Shahadara Mannan Shilpi =

Bangladeshi politician

- সাহাদারা মান্নান শিল্পী

Member of Parliament for Bogra-1
- In office 14 July 2020 – 6 August 2024
- Preceded by: Abdul Mannan
- Succeeded by: Kazi Rafiqul Islam

Personal details
- Born: 14 February 1965 (age 61) Bogra District
- Party: Bangladesh Awami League
- Spouse: Abdul Mannan

Shahadara Mannan Shilpi (born 14 February 1965) is a politician of Bogra District of Bangladesh and a former member of parliament for the Bogra-1 constituency in the 2020 by-election.

== Birth and early life ==
Shilpi was born in Bogra district. She is the widow of Abdul Mannan, a former MP from the Bogra-1 constituency.

== Career ==
Shilpi is the president of Sariakandi Upazila Awami League. After the death of Abdul Mannan, a member of parliament for the Bogra-1 constituency, on 18 January 2020, Shahadara Mannan was elected as a member of parliament for the vacant seat of Bogra-1 on the nomination of the Awami League on 14 July 2020.
