= Bogra-1 =

Constituency of Bangladesh's Jatiya Sangsad

Coordinates: 24.89°N 89.57°E

- Constituency for the Jatiya Sangsad
- District: Bogra District
- Division: Rajshahi Division
- Electorate: 355,109 (2026)

Current constituency
- Created: 1973
- Party: Bangladesh Nationalist Party
- Member: Kazi Rafiqul Islam
- ← 35 Joypurhat-2 37 Bogra-2 →

Bogra-1 is a constituency represented in the Jatiya Sangsad (National Parliament) of Bangladesh since 2026 by Kazi Rafiqul Islam of the Bangladesh Nationalist Party.

== Boundaries ==
The constituency encompasses Sariakandi and Sonatola upazilas.

== History ==
The constituency was created for the first general elections in newly independent Bangladesh, held in 1973.

Ahead of the 2008 general election, the Election Commission redrew constituency boundaries to reflect population changes revealed by the 2001 Bangladesh census. The 2008 redistricting altered the boundaries of the constituency.

Ahead of the 2014 general election, the Election Commission reduced the boundaries of the constituency. Previously it had also included two union parishads of Dhunat Upazila: Bhandarbari and Gosainbari.

== Members of Parliament ==
Election	Member	Party
1973	Mafiz Ali Chowdhury	Awami League
1979	Abdul Alim	Bangladesh Nationalist Party
Major Boundary Changes
1986	Mohammad Abdul Momin Mandal	Jatiya Party
1991	Habibur Rahman	Bangladesh Nationalist Party
2001	Kazi Rafiqul Islam	Bangladesh Nationalist Party
2008	Abdul Mannan	Awami League
2020 by-election	Shahdara Mannan shilpi	Awami League
2026	Kazi Rafiqul Islam	Bangladesh Nationalist Party

== Elections ==
=== Elections in the 2020s ===
General election 2026: Bogra-1
Party	Candidate	Votes	%	±%
BNP	Kazi Rafiqul Islam			
Jamaat	Md. Shahabuddin			
IAB	A. B. M. Mustafa Kemal Pasha			
Gono Forum	Md. Zulfiqar Ali			
BCP	Md. Asadul Haque			
Majority				
Turnout				

=== Elections in the 2010s ===
Abdul Mannan was re-elected unopposed in the 2014 general election after opposition parties withdrew their candidacies in a boycott of the election.

=== Elections in the 2000s ===
General Election 2008: Bogra-1
Party	Candidate	Votes	%	±%
AL	Abdul Mannan	127,000	50.9	+13.0
BNP	Md. Shokrana	121,965	48.9	−12.2
PDP	A. T. M. Shahidullah Taher	687	0.3	N/A
Majority		5,035	2.0	−21.2
Turnout		249,652	90.2	+18.7
AL gain from BNP				

General Election 2001: Bogra-1
Party	Candidate	Votes	%	±%
BNP	Kazi Rafiqul Islam	120,382	61.1	−2.1
AL	Abdul Mannan	74,622	37.9	+13.4
IJOF	Md. Zillur Rahman	1,127	0.6	N/A
WPB	Ziaul Haq Zia	519	0.3	N/A
Independent	Md. Tabibar Rahman Pramanik	203	0.1	N/A
Independent	Md. Ferdous Jaman Mukul	136	0.1	N/A
Majority		45,760	23.2	−15.5
Turnout		196,989	71.5	−0.5
BNP hold				

=== Elections in the 1990s ===
General Election June 1996: Bogra-1
Party	Candidate	Votes	%	±%
BNP	Habibur Rahman	92,543	63.2	+16.9
AL	Abdul Mannan	35,889	24.5	+11.7
Jamaat	Md. Shahabuddin	13,007	8.9	−7.0
JP(E)	Abdul Momen	4,456	3.0	−1.6
JSD	Wazedur Rahman	499	0.3	N/A
Majority		56,654	38.7	+8.3
Turnout		146,394	72.0	+19.9
BNP hold				

General Election 1991: Bogra-1
Party	Candidate	Votes	%	±%
BNP	Habibur Rahman	62,644	46.3	
Jamaat	Md. Shahabuddin	21,521	15.9	
AL	Abdul Mannan	17,289	12.8	
Independent	Md. Taherul Islam	16,224	12.0	
JP(E)	Abdul Momen	6,225	4.6	
NAP (Muzaffar)	Hafizar Rahman Mondol	4,034	3.0	
Independent	Shah Nasbullah	2,379	1.8	
Independent	A. H. M. Abdul Kaffi	1,761	1.3	
Bangladesh Janata Party	Moksadur Rahman Khan	1,099	0.8	
Independent	Asalat Zaman	766	0.6	
Zaker Party	Moksed Ali	556	0.4	
Jatiya Samajtantrik Dal-JSD	Md. Mukbul Hossain	502	0.4	
Bangladesh Muslim League (Kader)	Md. Amzad Hossain	195	0.1	
Majority		41,123	30.4	
Turnout		135,195	52.1	
BNP gain from JP(E)				
