= Muljan =

Muljan মুলজান
- Rural
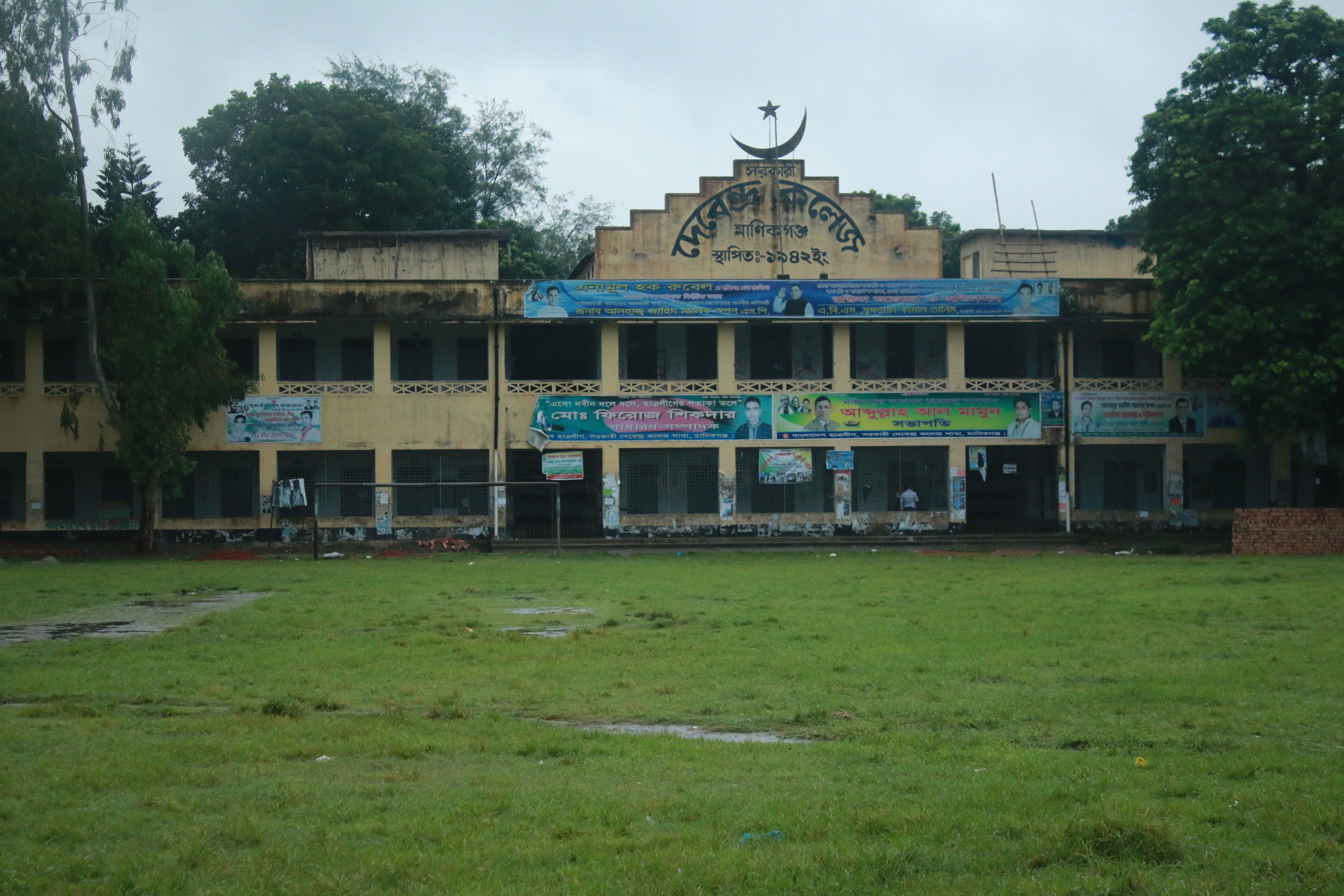
- Skyline of Muljan, Manikganj Sadar, Bangladesh

- Location in Bangladesh
- Coordinates: 23°52.3′N 89°58′E
- Country: Bangladesh
- Division: Dhaka
- Upazila: Manikganj Sadar

Area
  - Total: 1.73 km^{2} (0.67 sq mi)

Population (2011)
  - Total: 1,394
  - Density: 806/km^{2} (2,090/sq mi)
- Time zone: UTC+6 (BST)

Muljan (Bengali: মুলজান) is a village under Manikganj Sadar Upazila of Manikganj District, Bangladesh.

== Geography ==
Muljan is located at 23.8721°N 89.9659°E. It has a total area of 427 acres (1.73 km^{2}).

== Demographics ==
According to the 2011 Bangladesh census, Muljan had 350+ households and a population of 1,394.

== Administration ==
Muljan has 1 rural, The Rural are - korcha Badha. 3 Mauzas/Mahallas, and 1 villages.

== Infrastructure ==
Dighi Union has many institute. Among te institution-

- Dighi Union Muljan
- Grameen Bank Muljan
- Union Health Center
- Manikganj Palli Bidyut Samity
- Muljan Bus Station
- Muljan Jame Mosque

=== Roads ===
National Highway 5 Dhaka-Bangladesh Highway. N5 (Bangladesh)

== Education ==
Among the educational institutions.

=== Higher secondary educational institutions ===
No.

=== Secondary educational institution ===
Muljan High School
