= Habibur Rahman (Bogra politician) =

Bangladeshi politician

- হাবিবুর রহমান

Member of Parliament for Bogra-7
- In office 18 February 1979 – 12 February 1982
- Preceded by: Amanullah Khan
- Succeeded by: Aminul Islam Sarker

Member of Parliament for Bogra-1
- In office 1991–2001
- Preceded by: Abdul Momin Mandal
- Succeeded by: Kazi Rafiqul Islam

Personal details
- Born: 4 February 1931 Bogra
- Died: 11 May 2002 (aged 71) Bogra
- Party: Bangladesh Nationalist Party

Habibur Rahman (4 February 1931 – 11 May 2002) was a Bangladesh Nationalist Party politician and a member of parliament for Bogra-7 and Bogra-1.

== Birth and early life ==
Habibur Rahman was born in Bogra District.

== Career ==
Habibur Rahman was elected to parliament from Bogra-7 as a Bangladesh Nationalist Party candidate in 1979. He was elected to parliament from Bogra-1 as a Bangladesh Nationalist Party candidate in 1991, February 1996 and June 1996. He was a member of the 3rd National Assembly of Pakistan representing Bogra-II.

== Death ==
Habibur Rahman died on 11 May 2002.

== See also ==
- Jatiya Sangsad
