= Fulki Union =

Fulki Union ফুলকী ইউনিয়ন
- Location of Fulki in Bangladesh
- Coordinates: 24.28507099°N 90.014956°E
- Country: Bangladesh
- Division: Dhaka Division
- District: Tangail District
- Upazila: Basail Upazila
- Established: 1984

Government
  - Type: Union Council
  - Chairman: Jahidur Rahman Babul (Bangladesh Nationalist Party)

Area
  - Total: 27.72 km^{2} (10.70 sq mi)
- Elevation: 11 m (36 ft)

Population (2011)
  - Total: 29,792
  - Density: 1,075/km^{2} (2,784/sq mi)
- Time zone: UTC+6 (BST)
- Postal code: 1936
- Website: fulkiup.tangail.gov.bd

Fulki Union (Bengali: ফুলকী ইউনিয়ন) is a union of Basail Upazila, Tangail District, Bangladesh. It is situated 11 kilometres (6.8 mi) east of Tangail.

== Demographics ==
According to the 2011 Bangladesh census, Fulki Union had 7,356 households and a population of 29,792. The literacy rate (age 7 and over) was 48% (male: 50.6%, female: 45.8%).

== See also ==
- Union Councils of Tangail District
