= Basail Union =

Basail Union বাসাইল ইউনিয়ন
- Location of Basail Union in Bangladesh
- Coordinates: 24.23347149°N 90.01433171°E
- Country: Bangladesh
- Division: Dhaka Division
- District: Tangail District
- Upazila: Basail Upazila
- Established: 1984

Government
  - Type: Union Council

Area
  - Total: 26.12 km^{2} (10.08 sq mi)
- Elevation: 12 m (39 ft)

Population (2011)
  - Total: 26,706
  - Density: 1,022/km^{2} (2,648/sq mi)
- Time zone: UTC+6 (BST)
- Postal code: 1920
- Website: basailup.tangail.gov.bd

Basail Union (Bengali: বাসাইল ইউনিয়ন) is a union of Basail Upazila, Tangail District, Bangladesh. It is situated 17 kilometres (11 mi) east of Tangail, the district headquarters.

== Demographics ==
According to the 2011 Bangladesh census, Basail Union had 6,388 households and a population of 26,706. The literacy rate (age 7 and over) was 50.4% (male: 53.2%, female: 48%).

== See also ==
- Union Councils of Tangail District
