= Kaoaljani Union =

Kawaljani Union কাউলজানী ইউনিয়ন
- Location of Kawaljani in Bangladesh
- Coordinates: 24.26625394°N 90.04973352°E
- Country: Bangladesh
- Division: Dhaka Division
- District: Tangail District
- Upazila: Basail Upazila
- Established: 1984

Government
  - Type: Union Council
  - Chairman: Habibur Rahman Chowdhury Hobi (Bangladesh Awami League)

Area
  - Total: 21.61 km^{2} (8.34 sq mi)
- Elevation: 12 m (39 ft)

Population (2011)
  - Total: 21,554
  - Density: 997.4/km^{2} (2,583/sq mi)
- Time zone: UTC+6 (BST)
- Postal code: 1920
- Website: kaoaljaniup.tangail.gov.bd

Kawaljani Union (Bengali: কওয়ালজানী ইউনিয়ন) is a union of Basail Upazila, Tangail District, Bangladesh. It is situated 4 kilometres (2.5 mi) west of Basail and 12 kilometres (7.5 mi) east of Tangail, the district headquarters.

== Demographics ==
According to the 2011 Bangladesh census, Kaoaljani Union had 5,406 households and a population of 21,554. The literacy rate (age 7 and over) was 49.9% (male: 53.9%, female: 46.6%).

== See also ==
- Union Councils of Tangail District
