= Nizbolail =

Village in Rajshahi Division, Bangladesh

Coordinates: 24.9486°N 89.5572°E

Nizbolail is a village of Hatsherpur Union of Sariakandi Upazila of Bogra District.

== Geographic location ==
This village is situated at the central point of Hatsherpur Union. In the east of this village, Hatsherpur; in the west, Gonokpara; in the north, Shahanbanda; in the south, Hasnapara. Jamuna River flows in the east of this village and Bangalee river in the west.

== Education ==
There are one high school named Nizbolail High School, one madrasha named Nizbolail Islamia Alim Madrasha, three primary schools named Nizbolail Govt. Primary School, Majipara Govt. Primary School, Poshchimpara Govt. Primary School. There are also two colleges named Nizbolail EN College and Nizbolail Business Management Institute.
