= Dighi Union =

Dighi Union দিঘী ইউনিয়ন
- Union
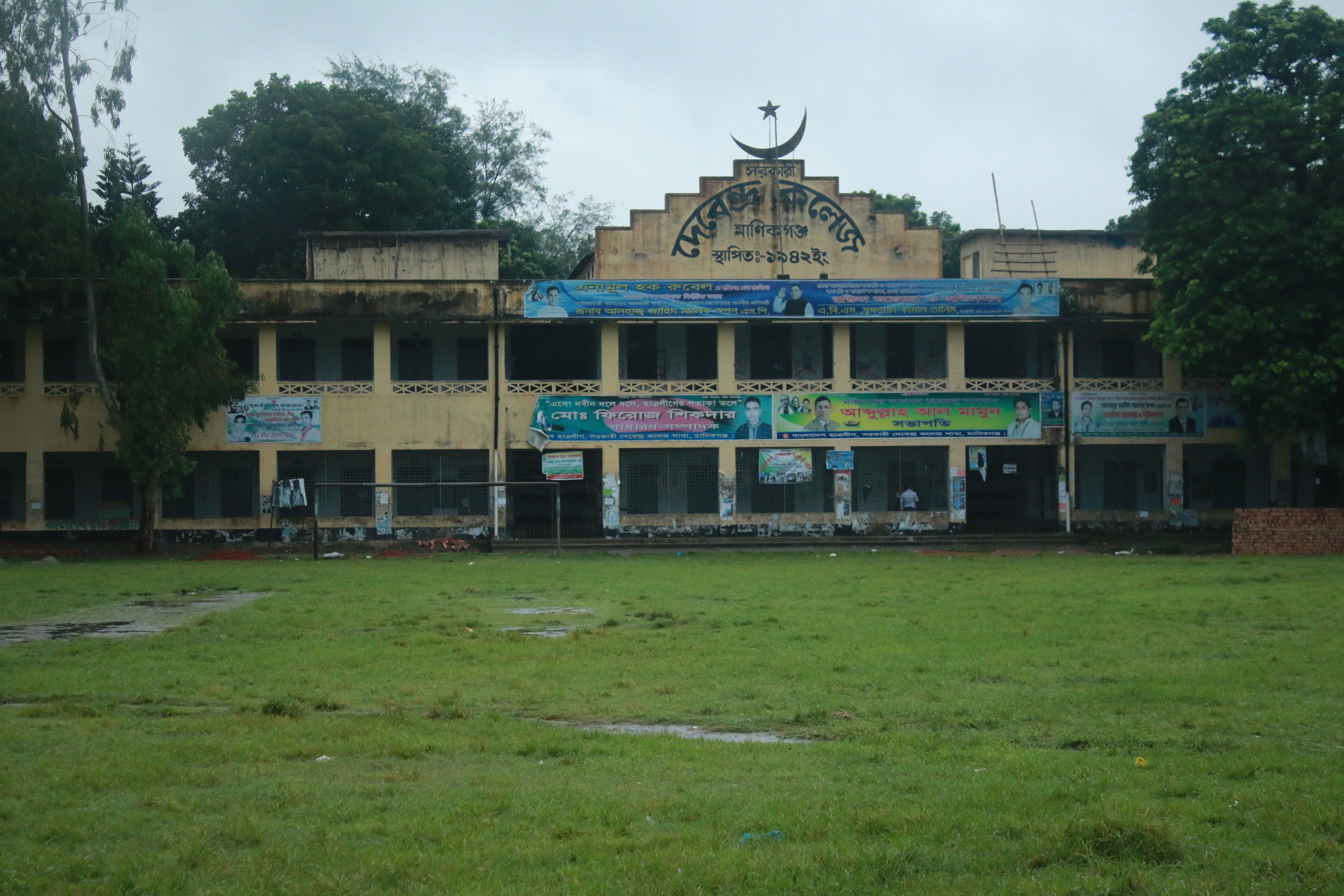
- Govt Debendra College Manikgonj

- Location in Bangladesh
- Coordinates: 23°52′20″N 89°57′57″E
- Country: Bangladesh
- Division: Dhaka
- District: Manikganj District
- Upazila: Manikganj Sadar

Area
  - Total: 10.53 km^{2} (4.07 sq mi)

Population (2011)
  - Total: 20,094
  - Density: 1,908/km^{2} (4,942/sq mi)
- Time zone: UTC+6 (BST)
- Postal code: 1802
- Website: dighi%20union.govt.bd

Dighi Union (Bengali: দিঘী ইউনিয়ন) is union parishad under Manikganj Sadar Upazila of Manikganj District, Bangladesh.

== Geography ==
Dighi Union is located at 23.8721°N 89.9659°E. It has a total area of 2,601 acres (10.53 km^{2}).

== Demographics ==
According to the 2011 Bangladesh census, Dighi Union had 4,629 households and a population of 20,094.

== Economy ==
There are total 4 Haats and Bazars. Besides 8 fairs (Mela) are held in Dighi Union. Tara Bazar, Dautia Bazar, BoT Tola Bazar(Bangla) are famous bazar in Dighi Union.

== Administration ==
Dighi Union has 26 rural, The Rural are - Muljan, Vatbaour, Dighi, Bagzan, Romonpur, Gulotia, Susunda, Dayotia, khagrakuri, Rohadoho, Kutai, Chamta, Notun bosti, Bot-tola 29 Mauzas/Mahallas, and 36 villages.

== Road ==
National Highway 5 Dhaka-Bangladesh Highway. N5 (Bangladesh)

== River ==
Kaliganga River

== Institution ==
Dighi Union has 2 College, 3 Secondary School, 7 Primary School, 1 Bank, 1 Union Health Center, 1 Protibondhi institute, 1 Electricity Institute, 1 Bus Station.

== Education ==
Among the educational institutions.

=== Higher secondary educational institutions ===
- Manikganj Medical College
- Garpara Hafiz Uddin Degree College.

=== Secondary educational institution ===
- Muljan High School, Manikganj
- Government Textile Vocational Institute Manikganj
- Dautia Garpara Rahima Hafij High School.
