= Samudra Gupta (poet) =

Bangladeshi journalist and poet (1946–2008)

- Born: Abdul Mannan; 23 June 1946; Hashil village, Sirajganj sub-division, Bengal Presidency, British India
- Died: 19 July 2008 (aged 62)
- Resting place: Martyred Intellectuals Memorial
- Occupations: Poet and journalist

Samudra Gupta (born Abdul Mannan; June 23, 1946 – July 19, 2008) was a Bangladeshi poet and journalist. Gupta was a strong critic of both communalism and Islamic fundamentalism, and expressed his opposition to these ideologies within his writings.

== Early life ==
Gupta was born Abdul Mannan on June 23, 1946, in Hashil village in Sirajganj sub-division. He was the fifth of Mohsin Ali and Rehana Ali's seven sons and one daughter. He completed his secondary education at Dhunat High School in Bogra in 1962, and higher secondary at Salimullah College in Dhaka in 1964.

== Career ==
Mannan adopted the pseudonym of Samudra Gupta during the 1960s and was recognized by his pen name during his life and career. He took part in the start of the uprising against Pakistan beginning in 1969 and fought in the Bangladesh Liberation War.

Gupta was originally a journalist by profession. He worked as different daily and weekly newspapers throughout Bangladesh. He also served as the general secretary of the Bangladesh National Poetry Council. He was an advisor of Bengali Language learning programme.

Gupta's first book of poetry, Rode Jholshano Mukh, was published in 1977. He wrote thirteen books of poetry during his career, as well as one work of fiction and an additional book of poetry as a collaboration with another writer. He also released many articles and short stories and served as the editor of several books.

Gupta's most notable writings include Rode Jholshano Mukh, Swapnamongol Kabyo, Ekhono Utthan Achhey, Chokhey Chokh Rekhey, Ekaki Roudrer Dike and Shekorer Shokey. His writings have been translated from Bengali into Chinese, French, Sinhalese, English, Hindi, Japanese, Urdu, Norwegian and Nepali.

== Personal life ==
Gupta was married to Happy Samudra. They had two daughters, Neel Samudra and Swapno Samudra.

== Death and legacy ==
Gupta died of gallbladder cancer on July 19, 2008, at the Narayana Hridayalaya Hospital in Bangalore, India. Jatiya Kabita Parishad had organized fund raisers for his treatment. He had been hospitalized in India for treatment since July 3, 2008. He was buried at Martyred Intellectuals Memorial. The 2009 National Poetry Festival was dedicated to him.

== Awards ==
- Lekhak Shibir (1977)
- Jessore Literature Award (1990)
- Poet Vishnu Dey Award (1995)
- Humayun Kabir Award
- Language Day Honour by the government of Tripura
