= Habla Union =

Habla Union হাবলা ইউনিয়ন
- Location of Habla in Bangladesh
- Coordinates: 24.18062275°N 90.0088191°E
- Country: Bangladesh
- Division: Dhaka Division
- District: Tangail District
- Upazila: Basail Upazila
- Established on: 1984

Government
  - Type: Union Council
  - Chairman: Khorshed Alam (Bangladesh Awami League)

Area
  - Total: 26.34 km^{2} (10.17 sq mi)
- Elevation: 11 m (36 ft)

Population (2011)
  - Total: 31,814
  - Density: 1,208/km^{2} (3,128/sq mi)
- Time zone: UTC+6 (BST)
- Postal code: 1920
- Website: Hablaup.tangail.gov.bd

Habla Union (Bengali: হাবলা ইউনিয়ন) is a union of Basail Upazila, Tangail District, Bangladesh. It is situated at 12 km southeast of Tangail.

== Demographics ==
According to Population Census 2011 performed by Bangladesh Bureau of Statistics, The total population of Habla union is 31,814. There are 7,491 households in total.

== Education ==
The literacy rate of Habla Union is 57% (Male-60.5%, Female-53.9%).

== See also ==
- Union Councils of Tangail District
