= Manikganj Government Women College =

- মানিকগঞ্জ সরকারি মহিলা কলেজ
- Type: Public
- Established: 1972
- Affiliations: National University, Bangladesh
- Principal: Induprova Das
- Location: Shahid rafique sarak, Manikganj Sadar Upazila, Manikganj, Dhaka; 23.8602°N 90.0053°E

Manikganj Government Women College is a government-owned higher secondary institution located in Shahid Rafique Sarak, Manikganj Sadar Upazila, Manikganj, Dhaka, Bangladesh. It was founded in 1972 to provide female education. It offers degrees and honors levels.

== History ==
The degree level was started in 1974 followed by the Higher Secondary School Certificate level in 1992. In 2011, the college started offering an honors level. It was nationalized in 1985.

== Campus ==
It stands on a 5.38-acre campus.

=== Library ===
The college has a library housing over 7000 books.

== Staff ==
The current principal of the college is Professor Dr. Mahbubur Rahman. The Vice-principal is Professor Ranajit Kumar Sarkar.

== Faculties and departments ==
The college has one faculty.

=== Faculty of Arts and Social Science ===
The faculty comprises five departments:

- Bangla
- English
- Islamic History and Culture
- Philosophy
- Political science

== Degree (Pass) Courses ==
- B.A. (Pass)
