= Kashil Union =

Kashil Union কাশিল ইউনিয়ন
- Location of Kashil in Bangladesh
- Coordinates: 24.23347149°N 90.01433171°E
- Country: Bangladesh
- Division: Dhaka Division
- District: Tangail District
- Upazila: Basail Upazila
- Established on: 1984

Government
  - Type: Union Council

Area
  - Total: 24.51 km^{2} (9.46 sq mi)
- Elevation: 12 m (39 ft)

Population (2011)
  - Total: 25,761
  - Density: 1,051/km^{2} (2,722/sq mi)
- Time zone: UTC+6 (BST)
- Postal code: 1920
- Website: kashilup.tangail.gov.bd

Kashil Union (Bengali: কাশিল ইউনিয়ন) is a union of Basail Upazila, Tangail District, Bangladesh. It is situated at 4 km west of Basail 12 km east of Tangail.

== Demographics ==
According to Population Census 2011 performed by Bangladesh Bureau of Statistics, The total population of Kashil union is 25,761. There are 6,223 households in total.

== Education ==
The literacy rate of Kashil Union is 50.4% (Male-53.2%, Female-48%).

== See also ==
- Union Councils of Tangail District
