= Kanchanpur Union, Tangail =

Kanchanpur Union কাঞ্চনপুর ইউনিয়ন
- Location of Kanchanpur in Bangladesh
- Coordinates: 24.2108404°N 90.0705582°E
- Country: Bangladesh
- Division: Dhaka Division
- District: Tangail District
- Upazila: Basail Upazila
- Established: 1984

Government
  - Type: Union Council
  - Chairman: Mamunur Rashid Mamun

Area
  - Total: 29.93 km^{2} (11.56 sq mi)
- Elevation: 11 m (36 ft)

Population (2011)
  - Total: 24,243
  - Density: 810.0/km^{2} (2,098/sq mi)
- Time zone: UTC+6 (BST)
- Postal code: 1920
- Website: kanchanpurup.tangail.gov.bd

Kanchanpur Union (Bengali: কাঞ্চনপুর ইউনিয়ন) is a union of Basail Upazila, Tangail District, Bangladesh. It is situated at 4 kilometres (2.5 mi) southeast of Basail and 20 kilometres (12 mi) east of Tangail.

== Demographics ==
According to the 2011 Bangladesh census, Kanchanpur Union had 5,701 households and a population of 24,243. The literacy rate (age 7 and over) was 47.3% (male: 50.7%, female: 44.5%).

== Education ==
According to Banglapedia, Kanchanpur Elahia Fazil Madrasa, founded in 1941, is a notable madrassa.

== See also ==
- Union Councils of Tangail District
