= Amanullah Khan (Bangladeshi politician) =

Bangladeshi politician

Member of Bangladesh Parliament
- In office 1973–1979
- Succeeded by: Habibur Rahman

Personal details
- Born: 1938 Bogra District, British India
- Died: 15 March 2018 (aged 79–80) Bogra, Bangladesh
- Party: Bangladesh Awami League

Amanullah Khan was a Bangladesh Awami League politician and member of parliament for Bogra-7.

== Biography ==
Khan was born in 1938 in Bogra District, British India (now Sherpur Upazila, Bangladesh), the eldest of 3 brothers and 2 sisters.

In 1964, he became a correspondent for newspaper The Daily Ittefaq.

Khan was elected to parliament from Bogra-7 as a Bangladesh Awami League candidate in 1973.

He died on 15 March 2018 in Bogra.
