= Basundia Union =

Basundia Union বসুন্দিয়া ইউনিয়ন
- Union
- Location in Bangladesh
- Coordinates: 23.1352°N 89.3685°E
- Country: Bangladesh
- Division: Khulna Division
- District: Jessore District
- Upazila: Jessore Sadar Upazila

Government
  - Type: Union council
- Time zone: UTC+6 (BST)
- Website: basundiaup.jessore.gov.bd

Basundia Union (Bengali: বসুন্দিয়া ইউনিয়ন) is a union parishad in Jessore Sadar Upazila of Jessore District, in Khulna Division, Bangladesh.
