= Government Textile Vocational Institute Manikganj =

Location
- Joyra Road, Manikganj District; 1804; Bangladesh
- Coordinates: 23.8894°N 89.9951°E

Information
- Type: Government high school
- Established: 2012
- Staff: 2
- Faculty: 10
- Grades: 9–10
- Enrollment: 120
- Language: Bangla
- Hours in school day: 6
- Campus type: Urban
- Colours: White and navy blue
- Sports: cricket, football

Government Textile Vocational Institute Manikganj is a secondary school in Dighi Union, Manikganj Sadar Upazila, Manikganj, Bangladesh. It provides schooling from class 9 to Secondary School Certificate (SSC). The school started operating from 2012. Its EIIN is 48046.

== See also ==
- List of schools in Bangladesh
