= Abdullah Sarkar =

Bangladeshi politician

- আব্দুল্লাহ সরকার

Member of the Bangladesh Parliament for Comilla-25
- In office 7 April 1973 – 24 February 1975

Personal details
- Born: 21 February 1942 Haimchar, Tipperah District, Bengal Presidency
- Died: 5 February 2013 (aged 70) Dhaka, Bangladesh
- Party: Socialist Party of Bangladesh
- Other political affiliations: Jatiya Samajtantrik Dal
- Education: University of Dacca

Abdullah Sarkar (Bengali: আব্দুল্লাহ সরকার; 21 February 1942 – 5 February 2013) was a Bangladeshi socialist politician, organizer of the Liberation War, and member of parliament.

== Early life and education ==
Sarkar was born on 21 February 1942 in Haimchar, Tipperah District, Bengal Presidency. His father was Pyar Ali Sarkar, and his mother was Chhaydunnesa. Sarkar matriculated from Comilla Zilla School. He completed his bachelor's degree from Chandpur Government College and studied law at the University of Dacca.

== Career ==
He began his political career through student politics. He played an active role in all the political movements of that era, including the Six Point program, the Language Movement, and the Bangladesh Liberation War.

He was elected as a Member of Parliament from the then Comilla-25 constituency as an independent candidate during the 1973 Bangladeshi general election. He later joined the Jatiya Samajtantrik Dal, which he left in 1980, becoming a member of the Central Committee of the Socialist Party of Bangladesh until 2010.

== Death ==
He died on 5 February 2013. He was buried at Haimchar in Chandpur with state honour following several namaz-e-janazas at the Central Shaheed Minar and Haimchar.
