= Dhunat High School =

Coordinates: 24.6836°N 89.5394°E

- Dhunat, Bogra, Rajshahi; Bangladesh

Information
- Former name: Dhunat Boys School
- Established: 1941; 85 years ago
- Gender: Boys (formerly); Mixed (currently)
- Enrollment: c.1200

Dhunat Govt. N.U. Pilot Model High School is a secondary school in Dhunat Upazila, Bogra, Bangladesh established in 1941. It is a central high school in Dhunat Upazila. More than 1200 students study there.

The Principal is Masiur Rahman. it was also known as Dhunat Boys School before it became co-educational.
