= Abdul Mannan (politician, born 1953) =

Bangladeshi politician (1953–2020)

Member of Parliament for Bogra-1
- In office 29 December 2008 – 18 January 2020
- Preceded by: Kazi Rafiqul Islam

President of Bangladesh Chhatra League
- Leader: Sheikh Hasina
- Preceded by: Mostofa Jalal Mohiuddin
- Succeeded by: Sultan Mohammad Mansur Ahmed

Personal details
- Born: 19 December 1953
- Died: 18 January 2020 (aged 66) Dhaka, Bangladesh
- Party: Bangladesh Awami League

Abdul Mannan (19 December 1953 – 18 January 2020) was a Bangladesh Awami League politician and a Jatiya Sangsad member representing the Bogra-1 constituency.

== Early life and career ==
Mannan was born on 19 December 1953. He completed his master's degree in agriculture science.

Mannan was elected to Parliament in 2008 and re-elected on 5 January 2014 from Bogra-1 as a Bangladesh Awami League candidate. He was the Bangladesh Awami League central Organising Secretary. In September 2013, he and his wife were injured in a road accident. He was also elected from this constituency in 2018.

== Death ==
Mannan died of cardiac arrest on 18 January 2020.
