= Kazi Rafiqul Islam =

Bangladeshi politician

- কাজী রফিকুল ইসলাম

Member of the Bangladesh Parliament for Bogra-1
- In office 2001–2006
- Preceded by: Habibur Rahman
- Succeeded by: Abdul Mannan
- Incumbent
- Assumed office 17 February 2026

Personal details
- Party: Bangladesh Nationalist Party

Kazi Rafiqul Islam is a Bangladesh Nationalist Party politician and a former member of parliament for Bogra-1.

== Career ==
Rafiqul Islam was elected to parliament from Bogra-1 as a Bangladesh Nationalist Party candidate in 2001.
