= Haimchar Upazila =

Haimchar হাইমচর
- Upazila
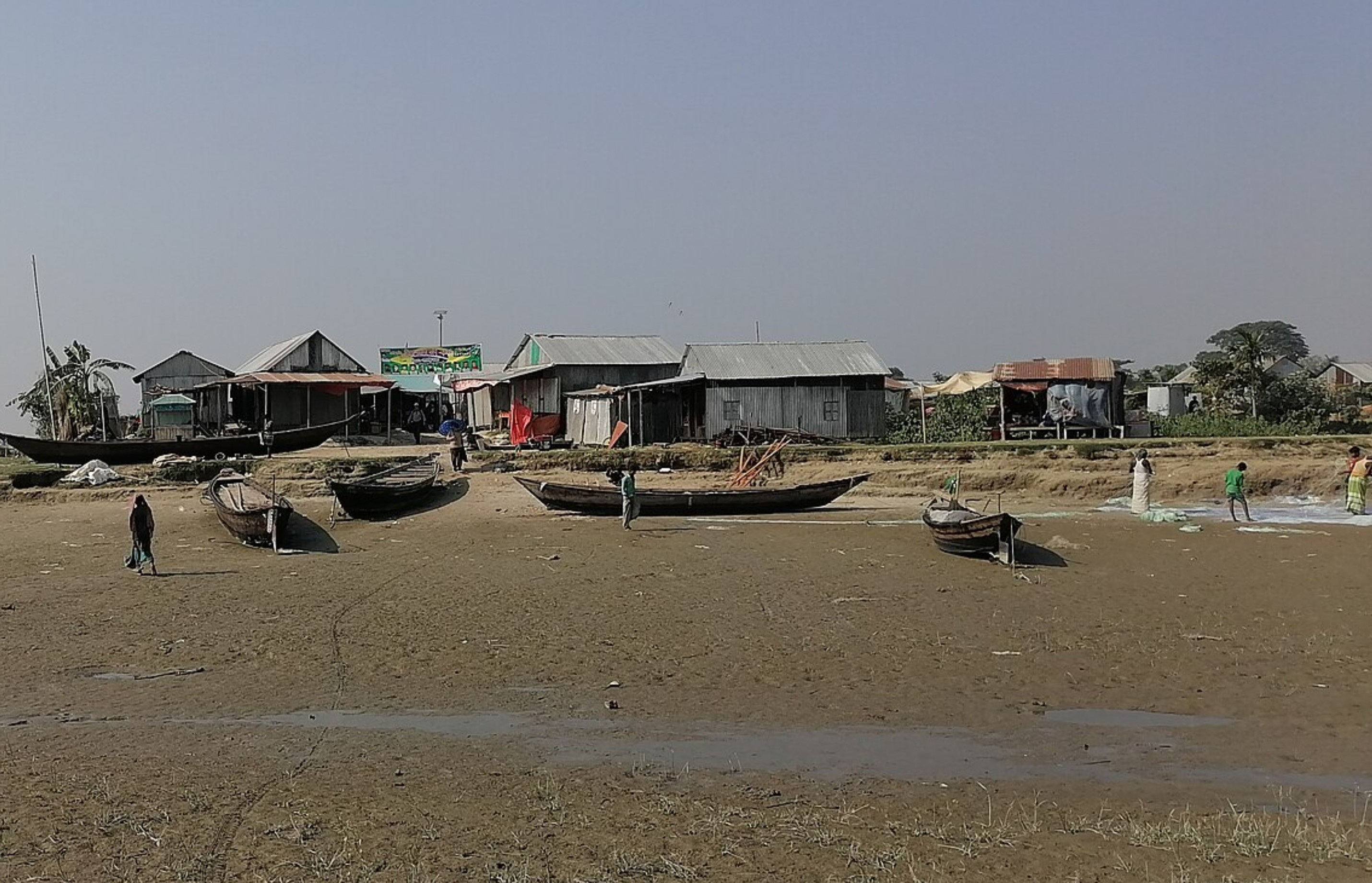
- Low Tide in Haimchar

- Coordinates: 23°4′N 90°38.3′E
- Country: Bangladesh
- Division: Chittagong
- District: Chandpur

Government

Area
  - Total: 134.16 km^{2} (51.80 sq mi)

Population (2022)
  - Total: 124,833
  - Density: 930.48/km^{2} (2,409.9/sq mi)
- Time zone: UTC+6 (BST)
- Postal code: 3660
- Website: Official Map of Haimchar

Haimchar (Bengali: হাইমচর) is an upazila of Chandpur District in the Division of Chittagong, Bangladesh.

== Geography ==
Haimchar is located at 23.0667°N 90.6375°E. It has a total area of 134.16 km^{2}.

== Demographics ==
Religions in Haimchar Upazila (2022)
Religion	Percent
Islam	96.60%
Hinduism	3.38%
Other or not stated	0.02%

According to the 2022 Bangladeshi census, Haimchar Upazila had 31,389 households and a population of 124,833. 10.49% of the population were under 5 years of age. Haimchar had a literacy rate (age 7 and over) of 71.97%: 72.45% for males and 71.51% for females, and a sex ratio of 97.57 males for every 100 females. 47,705 (38.22%) lived in urban areas.

According to the 2011 Census of Bangladesh, Haimchar Upazila had 24,903 households and a population of 109,575. 28,239 (25.77%) were under 10 years of age. Haimchar had a literacy rate (age 7 and over) of 48.13%, compared to the national average of 51.8%, and a sex ratio of 1042 females per 1000 males. 8,847 (8.07%) lived in urban areas.

According to the 1991 Bangladesh census, Haimchar had a population of 113,306. Males constituted 51.29% of the population, and females 48.71%. The population aged 18 or over was 52,033. Haimchar had an average literacy rate of 25.4% (7+ years), compared to the national average of 32.4%.

== Administration ==
Haimchar Upazila is divided into six union parishads: Char Bhairabi, Dakshin Algi Durgapur, Gazipur, Haimchar, Nilkamal, and Uttar Algi Durgapur. The union parishads are subdivided into 27 mauzas and 65 villages.

== Notable people ==
- Abdullah Sarkar, member of parliament (1973–1975), was born in Haimchar in 1942.

== See also ==
- Upazilas of Bangladesh
- Districts of Bangladesh
- Divisions of Bangladesh
