= Mohammad Abdul Momin Mandal =

Bangladeshi politician

- আবদুল মোমিন মণ্ডল

Member of Bangladesh Parliament
- In office 1986–1990

Personal details
- Party: Jatiya Party (Ershad)

Military service
- Branch/service: Bangladesh Army
- Rank: Colonel

Mohammad Abdul Momin Mandal is a Jatiya Party (Ershad) politician and a former member of parliament for Bogra-1.

== Career ==
Mandal was elected to parliament from Bogra-1 as a Jatiya Party candidate in 1986 and 1988.
