= Basail Upazila =

Basail বাসাইল
- Upazila
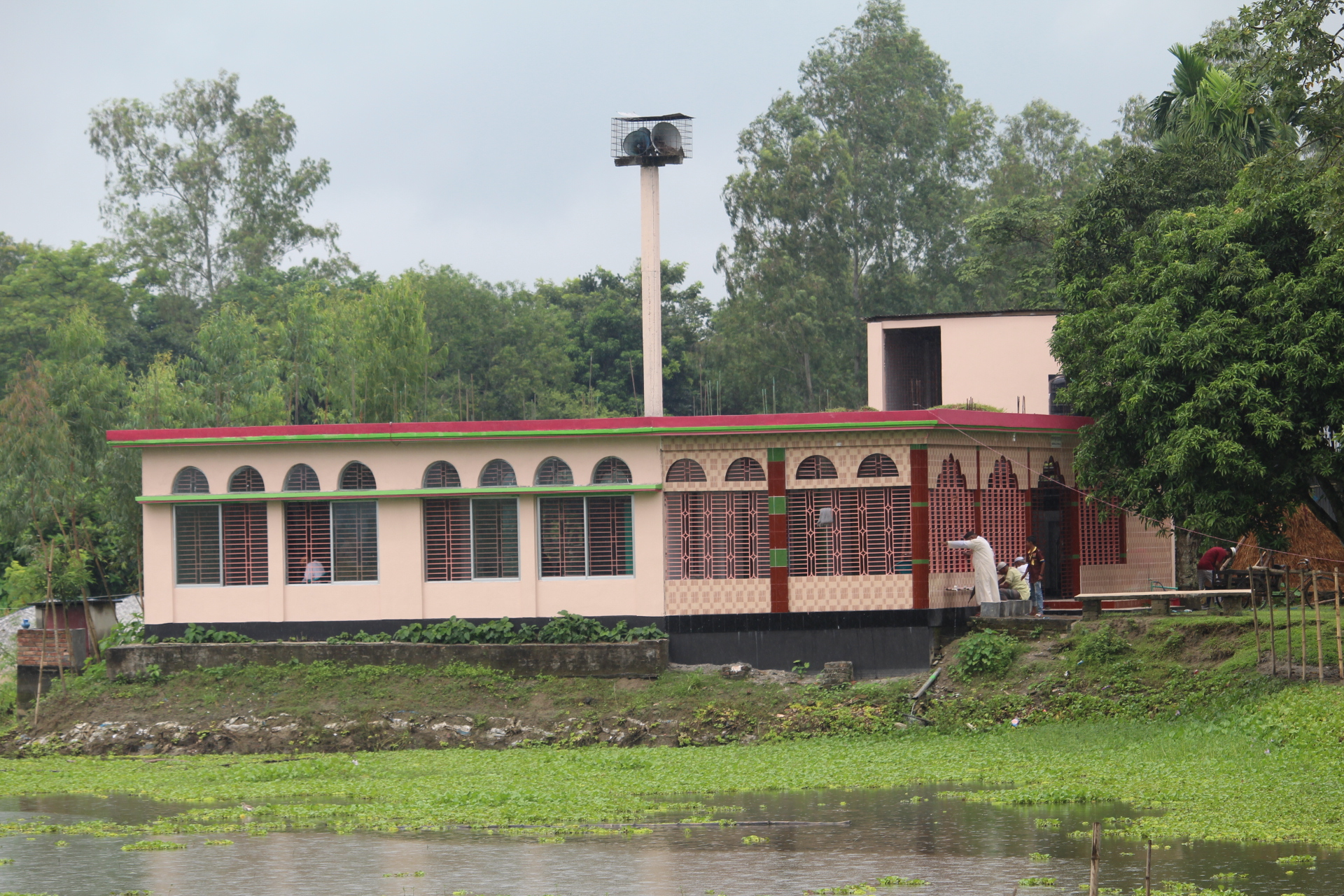
- Tuker Para Jame Masjid

- Coordinates: 24°13′N 90°3′E
- Country: Bangladesh
- Division: Dhaka
- District: Tangail

Area
  - Total: 157.77 km^{2} (60.92 sq mi)

Population (2022)
  - Total: 188,936
  - Density: 1,197.5/km^{2} (3,101.6/sq mi)
- Time zone: UTC+6 (BST)
- Postal code: 1920
- Area code: 09222
- Website: basail.tangail.gov.bd

Basail (Bengali: বাসাইল) is an upazila of Tangail District in the Division of Dhaka, Bangladesh.

== Geography ==
Basail is located at 24.2167°N 90.0500°E. It has 38,565 households and total area 157.77 km^{2}.

== Demographics ==
Religions in Basail Upazila (2022)
Religion	Percent
Islam	90.38%
Hinduism	9.61%
Other or not stated	0.01%

According to the 2022 Bangladeshi census, Basail Upazila had 49,024 households and a population of 188,936. 7.89% of the population were under 5 years of age. Basail had a literacy rate (age 7 and over) of 73.98%: 77.72% for males and 70.59% for females, and a sex ratio of 92.13 males for every 100 females. 50,594 (26.78%) lived in urban areas.

According to the 2011 Census of Bangladesh, Basail Upazila had 38,565 households and a population of 159,870. 32,219 (20.15%) were under 10 years of age. Basail had a literacy rate (age 7 and over) of 50.43%, compared to the national average of 51.8%, and a sex ratio of 1125 females per 1000 males. 13,496 (8.44%) lived in urban areas.

== Administration ==
Basail Upazila mauza geocode map

Basail Upazila is divided into six union parishads: Basail, Fulki, Habla, Kanchanpur, Kaoaljani, and Kashil. The union parishads are subdivided into 72 mauzas and 107 villages.

== Education ==
According to Banglapedia, Basail Govinda Government High School, founded in 1945, is a notable secondary school.

== Pictures ==
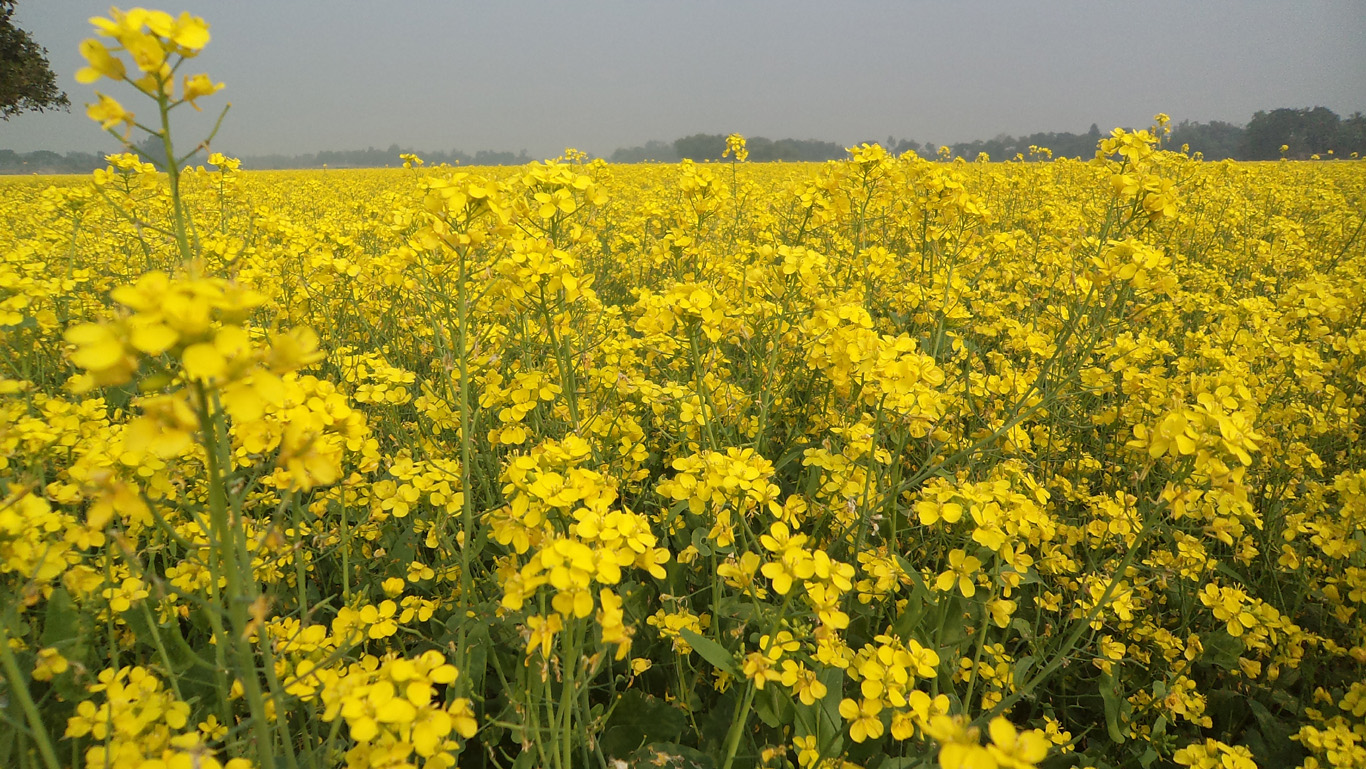
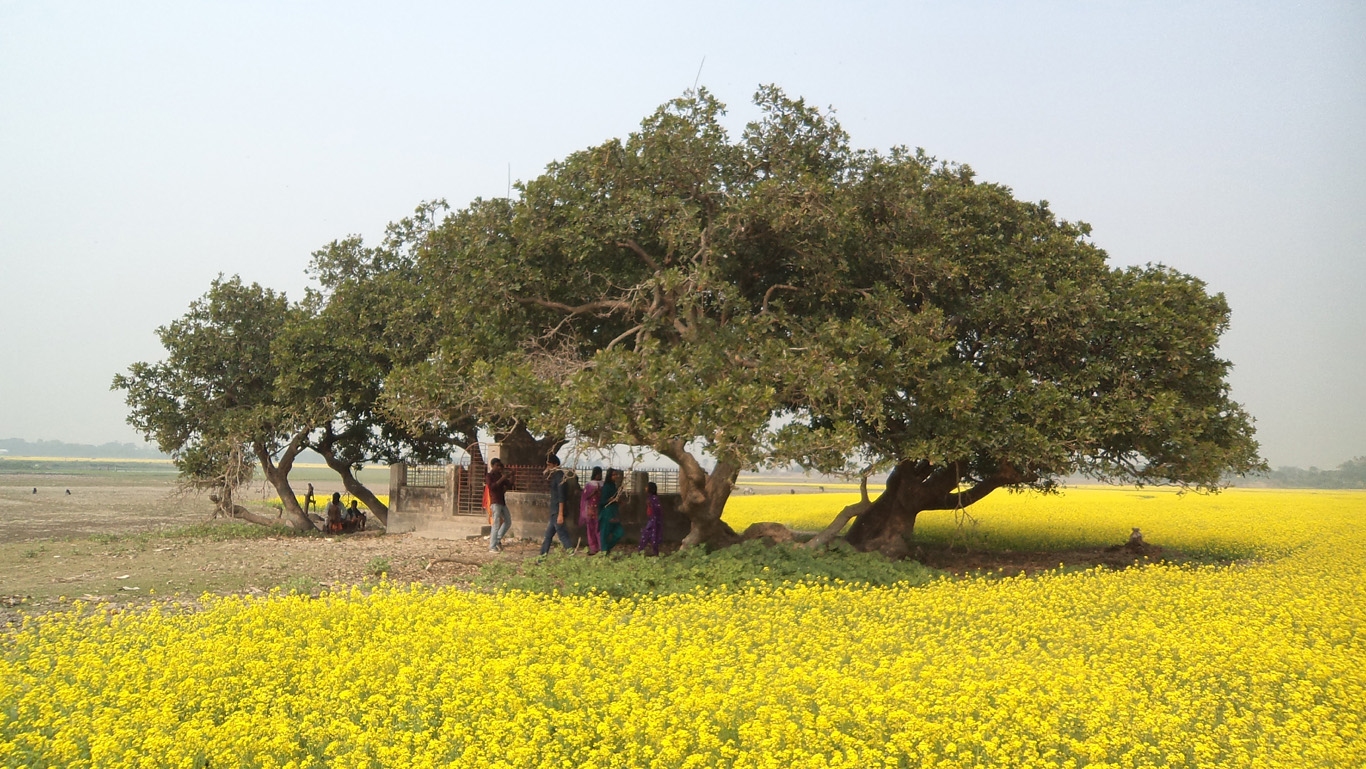
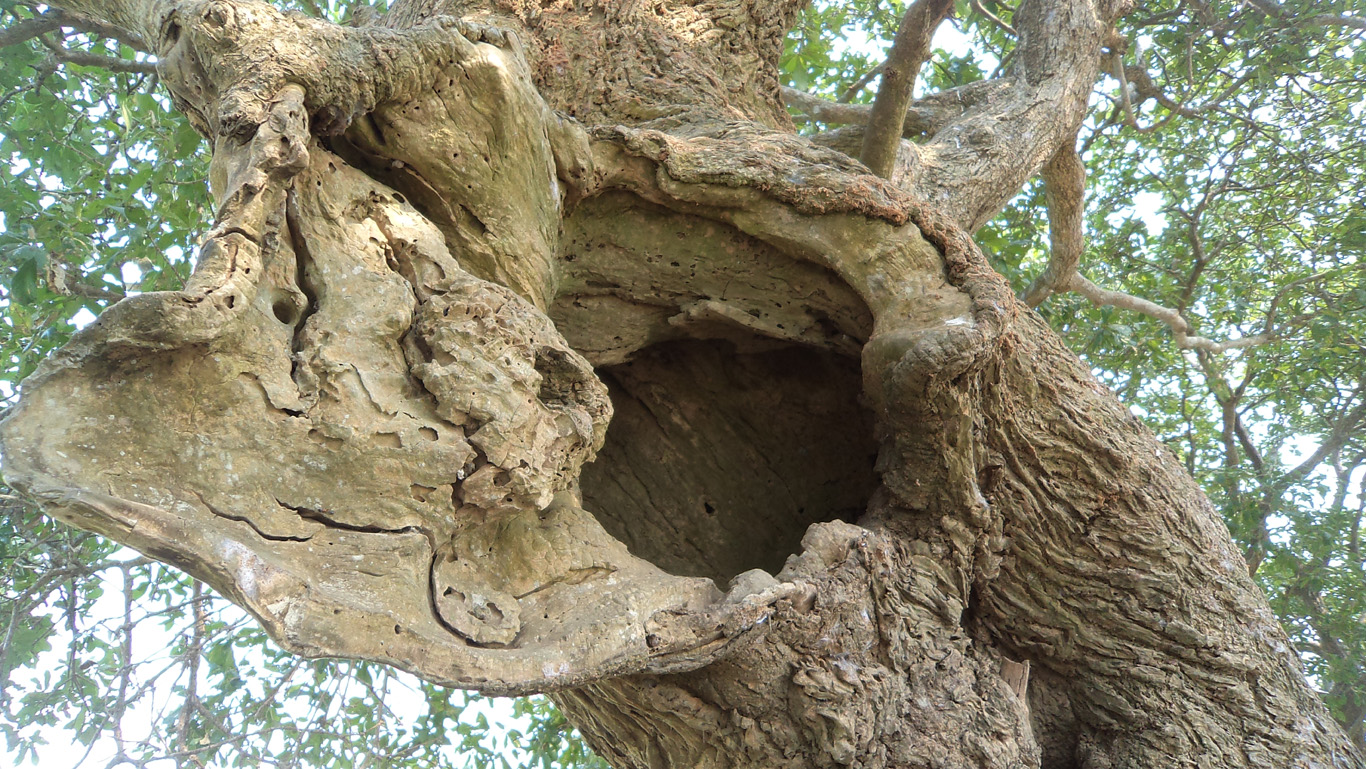
. .

== See also ==
- Upazilas of Bangladesh
- Districts of Bangladesh
- Divisions of Bangladesh
