= Sonatala Upazila =

Sonatala সোনাতলা
- Upazila
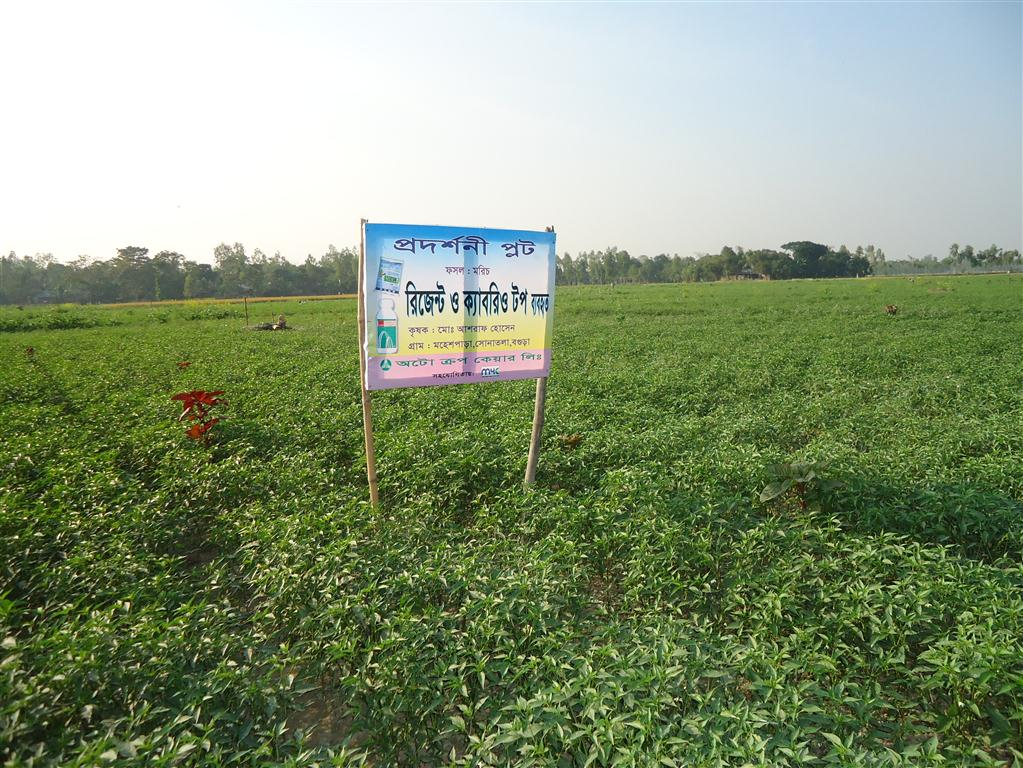
- Chilli Fields in Sonatala Upazila

- Coordinates: 25°2′N 89°30′E
- Country: Bangladesh
- Division: Rajshahi
- District: Bogra

Area
  - Total: 156.75 km^{2} (60.52 sq mi)

Population (2022)
  - Total: 193,463
  - Density: 1,234.2/km^{2} (3,196.6/sq mi)
- Time zone: UTC+6 (BST)
- Postal code: 5826
- Website: sonatala.bogra.gov.bd(in Bengali)

Sonatala Upazila (Bengali: সোনাতলা উপজেলা) is an upazila of Bogra District in the Division of Rajshahi, Bangladesh. Sonatala Thana was established in 1981 from Sariakandi Thana and was converted into an upazila in 1984. It is named after its administrative center, the town of Sonatala.

== Geography ==
Sonatala Upazila has a total area of 156.75 square kilometres (60.52 sq mi). It borders Rangpur Division to the north, Sariakandi Upazila to the east and south, Gabtali Upazila to the south and west, and Mokamtola Upazila to the west.

=== Beels ===
- Goborchapa Beel
- Gobochanra Beel
- Thengar Beel
- Mohicharan Beel
- Padir Beel
- Satbeel
- Chunepacha beel

== Demographics ==
Historical population
Year	Pop. (000)	±%
1981	153	—
1991	146	−4.6%
2001	168	+15.1%
2011	187	+11.3%
2022	193	+3.2%
Source: Bangladesh Bureau of Statistics

Religions in Sonatala Upazila (2022)
Religion	Percent
Islam	95.27%
Hinduism	4.72%
Other or not stated	0.01%

According to the 2022 Bangladeshi census, Sonatala Upazila had 53,410 households and a population of 193,463. 9.25% of the population were under 5 years of age. Sonatala had a literacy rate (age 7 and over) of 68.73%: 72.60% for males and 65.16% for females, and a sex ratio of 94.10 males for every 100 females. 31,464 (16.26%) lived in urban areas.

According to the 2011 Census of Bangladesh, Sonatola Upazila had 48,569 households and a population of 186,778. 43,922 (23.52%) were under 10 years of age. Sonatola had a literacy rate (age 7 and over) of 43.19%, compared to the national average of 51.8%, and a sex ratio of 1023 females per 1000 males. 24,720 (13.23%) lived in urban areas.

== Economy ==
=== Famous markets (Hat) ===
- Sonatola Hat
- Baluahat
- Karpur Bazar
- Karamja Hat
- Sayed Ahmed College Hat
- Pakulla Hat
- Horikhali hat

== Administration ==
Sonatala Upazila is divided into Sonatala Municipality and seven union parishads: Balua, Digdair, Zorgachha, Madhupur, Pakulla, Sonatala Sadar, and Tekani Chukainagar. The union parishads are subdivided into 94 mauzas and 131 villages.

Sonatala Municipality is subdivided into 9 wards and 16 mahallas.

== Transport ==
Rail stations Sayeed Ahmed College, Bhelurpara, and Sonatala are on the branch line connecting Santahar and Kaunia. In July 2014 they were served by six or eight intercity and six mail trains a day.

== Education ==
There are three colleges in the upazila. Government Nazir Akhter College, founded in 1967, is the only public one. A private one is Balua Hat Degree College, founded in 1987. Govt. Sonatola Model High School & College founded in 1908.

The madrasa education system includes one fazil madrasa.

== See also ==
- Upazilas of Bangladesh
- Districts of Bangladesh
- Divisions of Bangladesh
