= Chandraganj Upazila =

Chandraganj চন্দ্রগঞ্জ
- Upazila
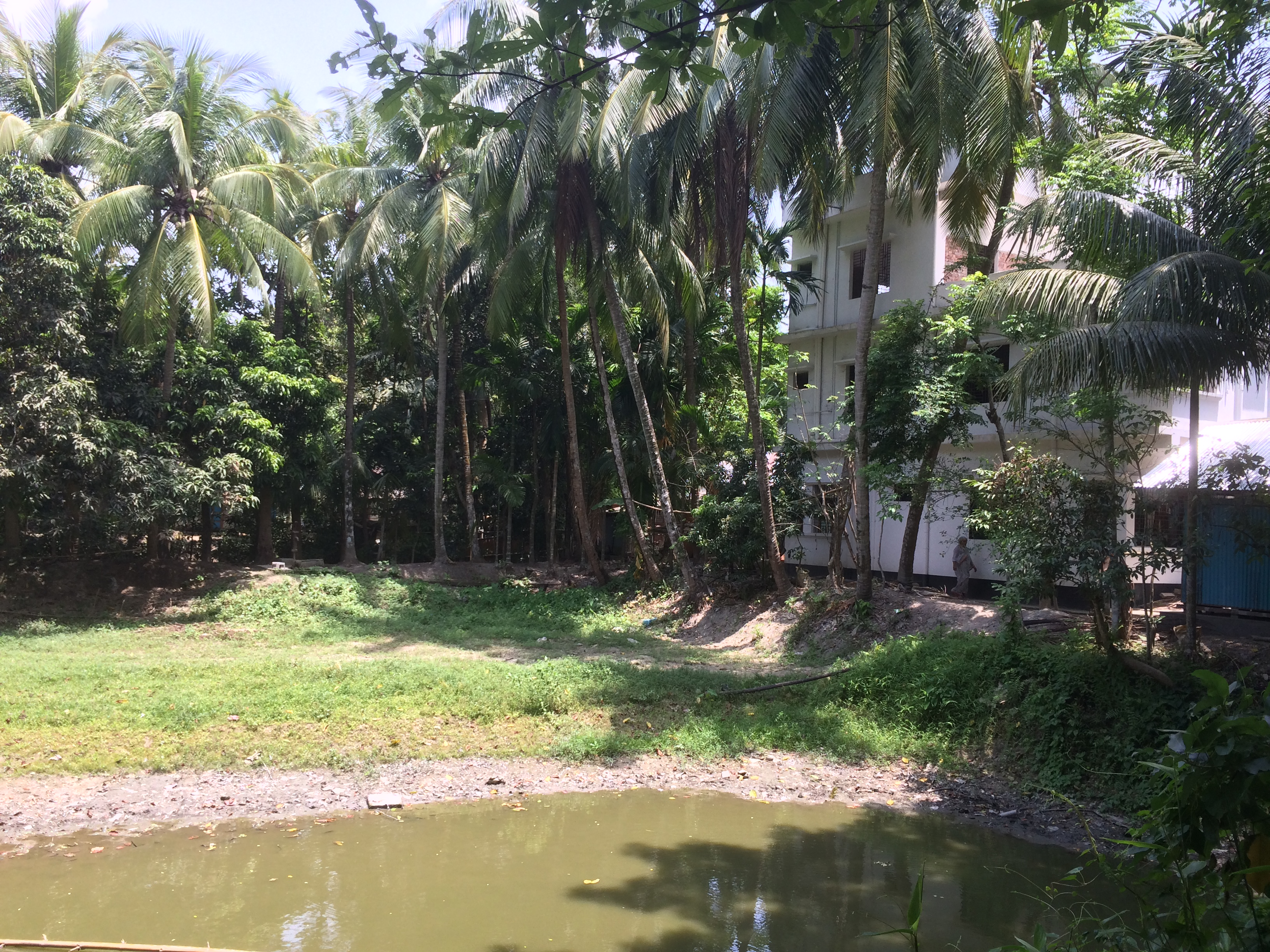
- A village pond surrounded by coconut trees in Chandraganj Upazila
- Country: Bangladesh
- Division: Chattogram
- District: Lakshmipur
- Established: May 2026
- Headquarters: Chandraganj

Area
  - Total: 173.85 km^{2} (67.12 sq mi)

Population (2022 Census)
  - Total: 304,091
  - Density: 1,749.2/km^{2} (4,530.3/sq mi)
- Time zone: UTC+6 (BST)
- Website: chandraganj.lakshmipur.gov.bd

Chandraganj (Bengali: চন্দ্রগঞ্জ) is an administrative upazila in the Lakshmipur District of Chattogram Division, Bangladesh. Established in May 2026, it was carved out of Lakshmipur Sadar Upazila to improve administrative efficiency in the eastern part of the district.

== Geography ==
Chandraganj Upazila covers a total area of 173.85 square kilometers. It is located approximately 65 kilometers away from the Lakshmipur district headquarters. The upazila is bounded by Ramganj Upazila to the north, Ramgati Upazila to the south, Lakshmipur Sadar Upazila to the west, and Chatkhil Upazila of Noakhali District to the east.

== History ==
The upazila is named after the Chandraganj Police Station, which was previously an administrative subunit of Lakshmipur Sadar. Following public hearings and administrative reviews in 2025, the National Implementation Committee for Administrative Reorganization (NICAR) officially upgraded the station to a full upazila status in early 2026.

== Administration ==
Chandraganj Upazila consists of nine Union Parishads:

- Bashikpur Union
- Dattapara Union
- Uttar Joypur Union
- Chandraganj Union
- Hazirpara Union
- Char Shahi Union
- Dighali Union
- Mandari Union
- Kushakhali Union

The upazila falls under the Lakshmipur-3 parliamentary constituency.

== Demographics ==
According to the 2022 Census of Bangladesh, the population of the area comprising the upazila was 304,091. The average literacy rate is 51.90%.

== Notable people ==
- Shaykh Ahmadullah – Renowned Islamic scholar, researcher, and social worker.

== See also ==
- Upazilas of Bangladesh
- Districts of Bangladesh
- Lakshmipur District
