= Kawkhali Upazila =

Kawkhali Upazila may refer to:

- Kawkhali Upazila, Pirojpur
- Kawkhali Upazila, Rangamati
