= Dhunat Upazila =

Dhunat ধুনট
- Upazila
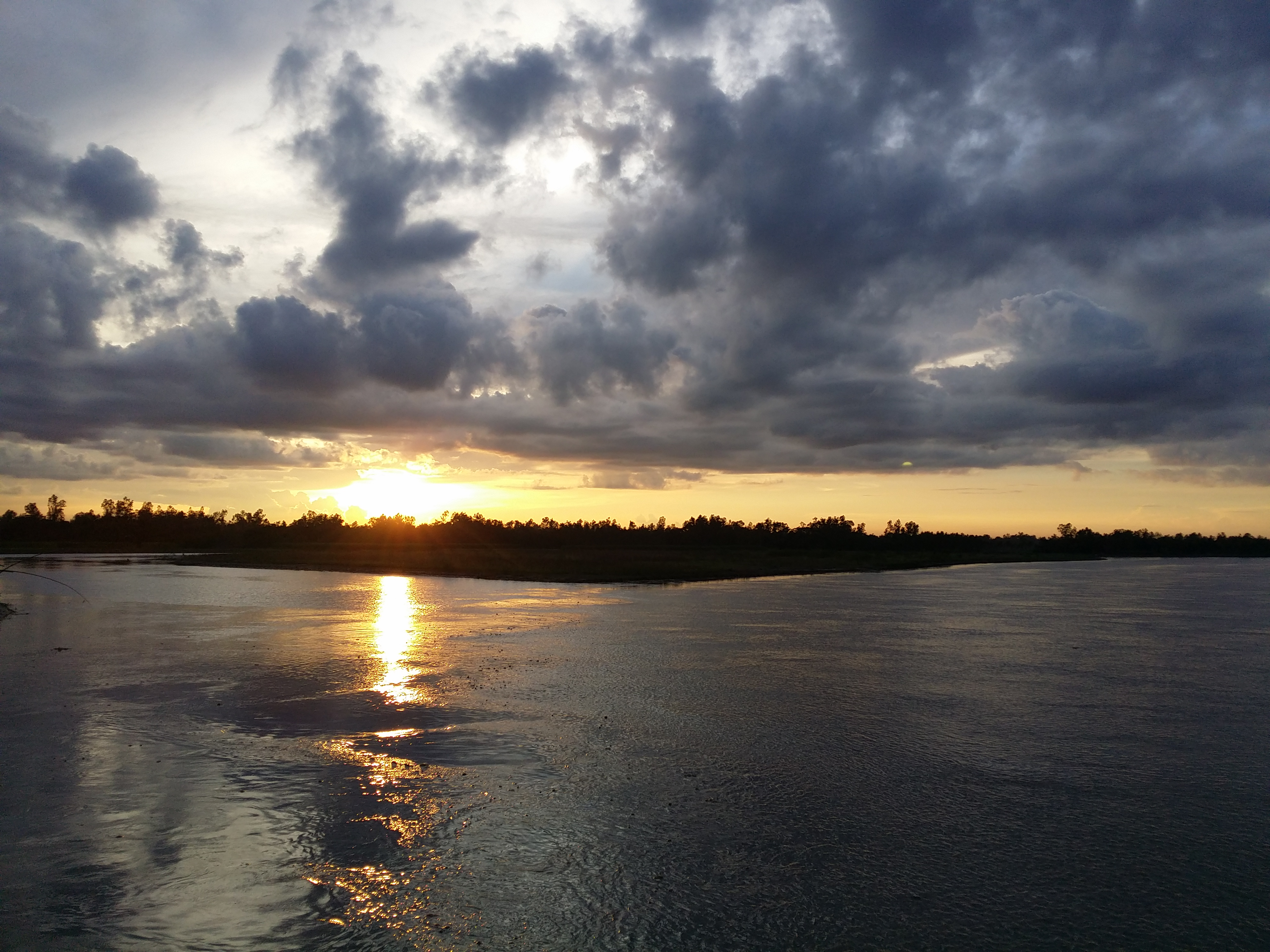
- Jamuna River in Dhunat Upazila

- Coordinates: 24°41′N 89°32′E
- Country: Bangladesh
- Division: Rajshahi
- District: Bogra

Area
  - Total: 247.43 km^{2} (95.53 sq mi)

Population (2022)
  - Total: 307,521
  - Density: 1,242.9/km^{2} (3,219.0/sq mi)
- Time zone: UTC+6 (BST)
- Postal code: 5850
- Area code: 05023
- Website: dhunot.bogra.gov.bd(in Bengali)

Dhunat Upazila mauza geocode map

Dhunat Upazila (Bengali: ধুনট উপজেলা) is an upazila of Bogra District in the Division of Rajshahi, Bangladesh.

Dhunat Thana was established in 1962 and was converted into an upazila in 1983. It is named after its administrative center, the town of Dhunat, which became a municipality in 2001. By 2006 Dhunat Municipality had achieved 100% sanitation and it was awarded as the 2nd pourashava among the country.

== Geography ==
Dhunat Upazila has a total area of 247.43 square kilometres (95.53 sq mi). It lies on the west bank of the Jamuna River. It borders Gabtali and Sariakandi upazilas to the north, Sirajganj District to the east and south, and Sherpur and Shajahanpur upazilas to the west.

== Demographics ==
Historical population
Year	Pop. (000)	±%
1981	213	—
1991	247	+16.0%
2001	271	+9.7%
2011	292	+7.7%
2022	308	+5.5%
Source: Bangladesh Bureau of Statistics

Religions in Dhunat Upazila (2022)
Religion	Percent
Islam	95.87%
Hinduism	4.12%
Other or not stated	0.01%

According to the 2022 Bangladeshi census, Dhunat Upazila had 84,503 households and a population of 307,521. 8.84% of the population were under 5 years of age. Dhunat had a literacy rate (age 7 and over) of 62.48%: 65.53% for males and 59.63% for females, and a sex ratio of 95.02 males for every 100 females. 31,335 (10.19%) lived in urban areas.

According to the 2011 Census of Bangladesh, Dhunat Upazila had 74,897 households and a population of 292,404. 67,775 (23.18%) were under 10 years of age. Dhunat had a literacy rate (age 7 and over) of 35.64%, compared to the national average of 51.8%, and a sex ratio of 1043 females per 1000 males. 22,673 (7.75%) lived in urban areas.

== Administration ==
Dhunat Upazila is divided into Dhunat Municipality and 10 union parishads: Kalerpara, Bhandarbari, Chaukibari, Chikashi, Dhunat, Elangi, Gopalnagar, Gosainbari, Mathurapur, and Nimgachhi. The union parishads are subdivided into 90 mauzas and 207 villages.

Chairman :Md. Abdul Hi Khokon

Vice Chairman :Md.Mohosin Alom

Women Vice Chairman :Popi Rani Saha

Upazila Nirbahi Officer (UNO): Rajia Sultana

Dhunat Municipality is subdivided into 9 wards and 16 mahallas.

== Education ==
There are 10 colleges in the upazila. They include Dhunat Mohila College, founded in 1996, Jalsuka Habibur Rahman Degree College, G.M.C Degree College, Goshai Bari Degree College, and Sonahata College. Dhunat Degree College, founded in 1972, is the only honors level college in the upazila.

According to Banglapedia, Panchthupi Nasratpur Jaher Ali High School, Dhunat High School, founded in 1941, is a notable secondary school and another Dhunat Adarsh High School, founded in 1988.

The madrasa education system includes three fazil madrasas. According to Banglapedia, Jorkhali Senior Madrasa, founded in 1911, is a notable one.

== See also ==
- Upazilas of Bangladesh
- Districts of Bangladesh
- Divisions of Bangladesh
