= Mokamtola Upazila =

Mokamtola মোকামতলা
- Upazila
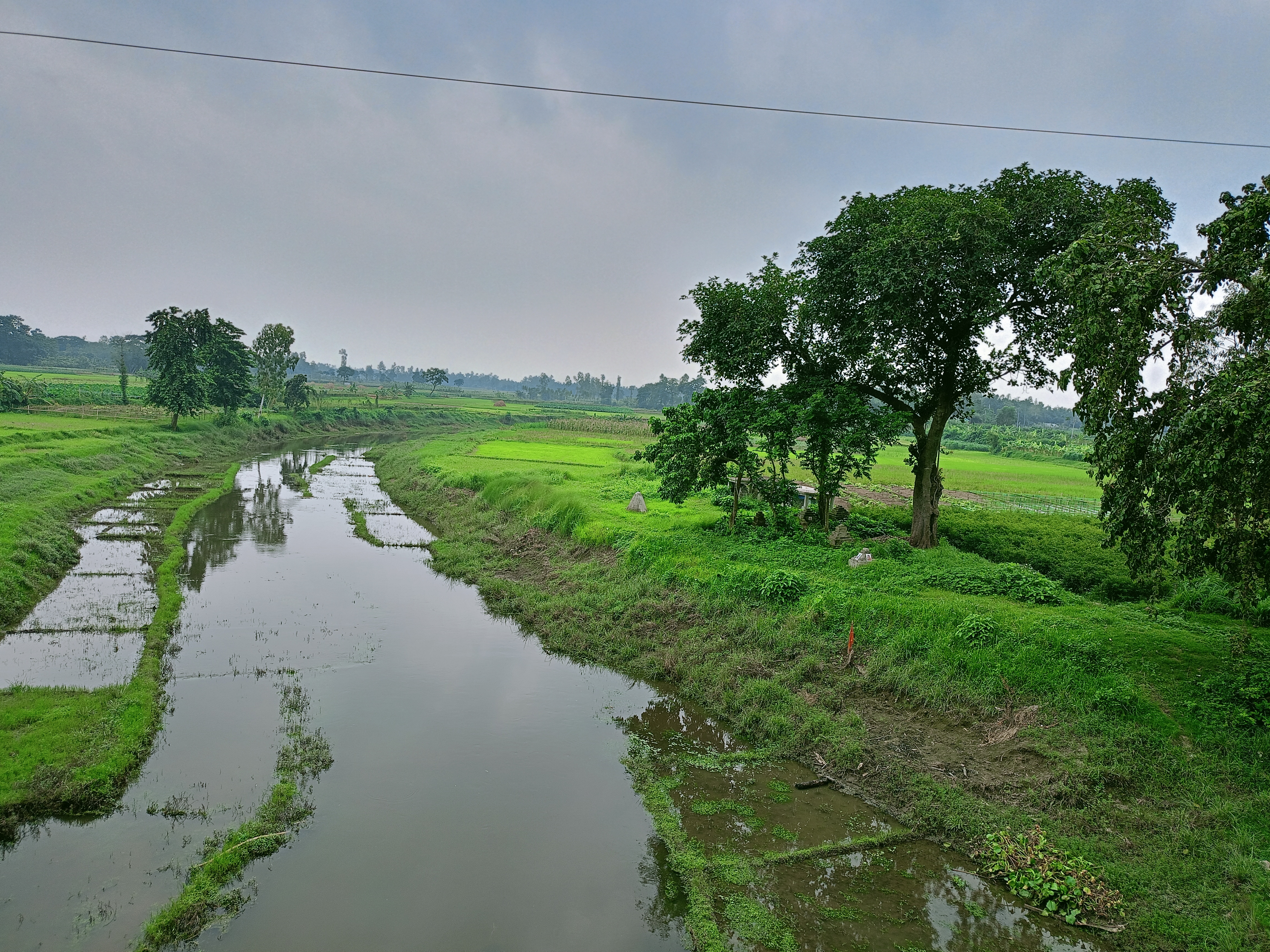
- Karatoa River at Mokamtala Upazila
- Country: Bangladesh
- Division: Rajshahi
- District: Bogura
- Established: 7 May 2026
- Headquarters: Mokamtola
- Time zone: UTC+6 (BST)

Mokamtola (Bengali: মোকামতলা) is a newly approved upazila of Bogura District in the division of Rajshahi, Bangladesh. It was officially upgraded to administrative upazila status by the National Implementation Committee for Administrative Reorganization (NICAR) on 7 May 2026.

== History ==
Mokamtala was previously a prominent trade hub and a union under Shibganj Upazila. Due to its growing population and economic importance, local residents long demanded its elevation to an upazila. On 23 February 2026, a formal application was submitted to the Ministry of Local Government. On 7 May 2026, the government formally approved the creation of Mokamtala as the 13th upazila of Bogura District.

== Administration ==
Mokamtala Upazila consists of five union parishads which were carved out of Shibganj Upazila:

- Mokamtala Union
- Deuli Union
- Saidpur Union
- Maidanhatta Union
- Shibganj Union

The upazila is part of the Bogra-2 parliamentary constituency.

== Economy ==
Mokamtala is considered a major commercial point in northern Bangladesh. It is located at a strategic junction on the N5 Highway (Dhaka–Rangpur Highway). The area is well known for its wholesale markets, cold storages, and agricultural trade, particularly potatoes and vegetables.

== See also ==
- Upazilas of Bangladesh
- Districts of Bangladesh
- Bogura District
