= Sariakandi Upazila =

Sariakandi সারিয়াকান্দি
- Upazila
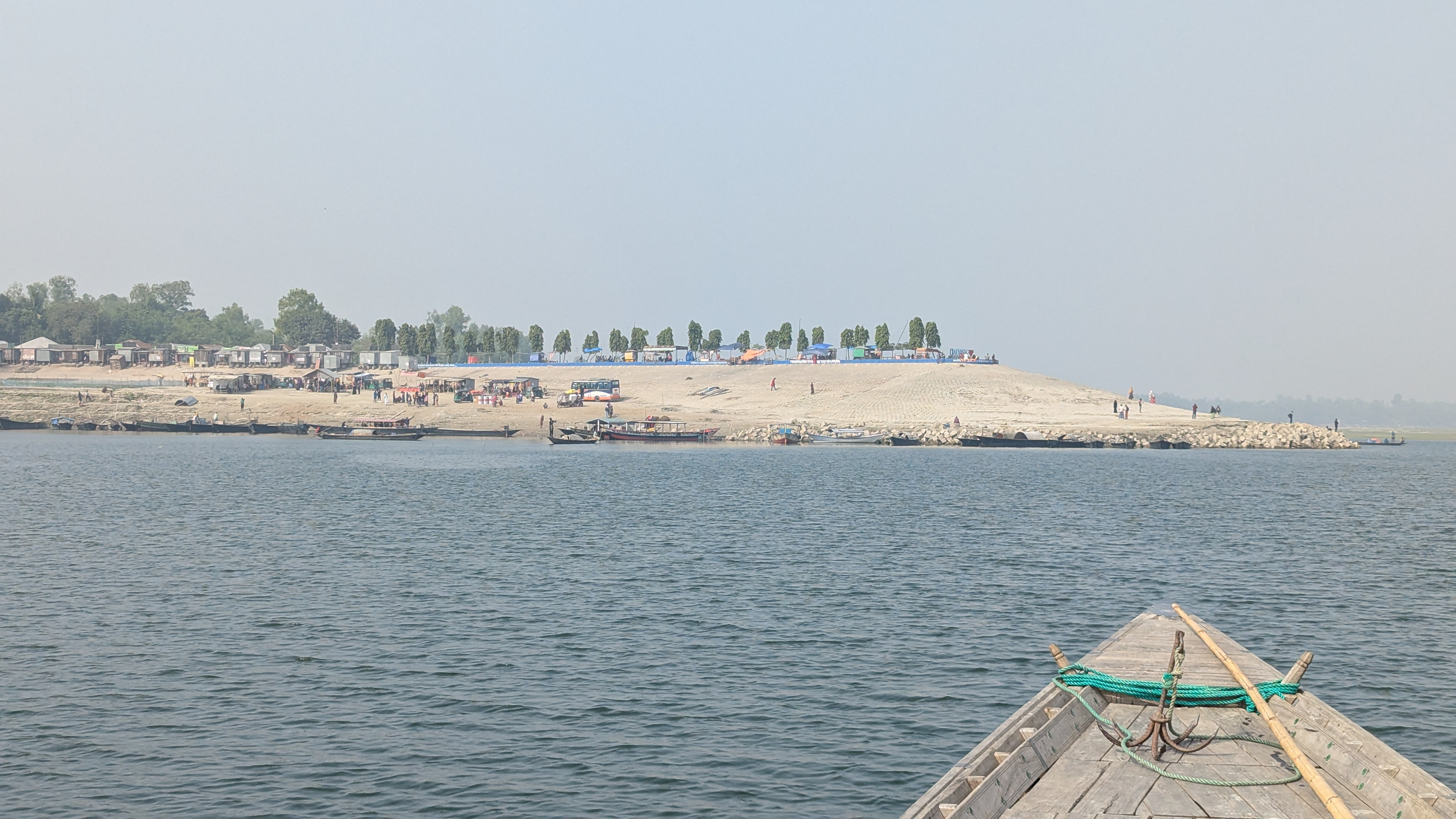
- Kalitola Groyen Badh on the bank of Jamuna river.

- Coordinates: 24°53′N 89°34′E
- Country: Bangladesh
- Division: Rajshahi
- District: Bogra

Government
  - M.P: Abdul Mannan

Area
  - Total: 408.50 km^{2} (157.72 sq mi)

Population (2022)
  - Total: 276,199
  - Density: 676.13/km^{2} (1,751.2/sq mi)
- Time zone: UTC+6 (BST)
- Postal code: 5830
- Area code: 05028
- Website: shariakandi.bogra.gov.bd(in Bengali)

Sariakandi Upazila mauza geocode map

Sariakandi Upazila (Bengali: সারিয়াকান্দি উপজেলা) is an upazila of Bogra District in the Division of Rajshahi, Bangladesh. Sariakandi Thana was established in 1886 and was converted into an upazila in 1983. It is named after its administrative center, the town of Sariakandi.

== Geography ==
Sariakandi Upazila has a total area of 432.55 square kilometres (167.01 sq mi). About three-fifths is land and two-fifths is water, chiefly the Jamuna River, which flows south through the upazila. It is the easternmost upazila of Bogra District. It borders Sonatala Upazila to the west and north, Fulchhari Upazila of Gaibandha District to the north, Islampur, Madarganj and Sarishabari upazilas of Jamalpur District to the east, Kazipur upazila of Sirajganj District to the southeast, Dhunat Upazila to the south, and Gabtali Upazila to the west.

== Demographics ==
Historical population
Year	Pop. (000)	±%
1981	199	—
1991	230	+15.6%
2001	240	+4.3%
2011	271	+12.9%
2022	276	+1.8%
Source: Bangladesh Bureau of Statistics

Religions in Sariakandi Upazila (2022)
Religion	Percent
Islam	97.72%
Hinduism	2.27%
Other or not stated	0.01%

According to the 2022 Bangladeshi census, Sariakandi Upazila had 82,835 households and a population of 276,199. 8.83% of the population were under 5 years of age. Sariakandi had a literacy rate (age 7 and over) of 63.48%: 66.91% for males and 60.07% for females, and a sex ratio of 100.20 males for every 100 females. 80,033 (28.98%) lived in urban areas.

According to the 2011 Census of Bangladesh, Sariakandi Upazila had 75,614 households and a population of 270,719. 66,938 (24.73%) were under 10 years of age. Sariakandi had a literacy rate (age 7 and over) of 36.94%, compared to the national average of 51.8%, and a sex ratio of 1001 females per 1000 males. 18,543 (6.85%) lived in urban areas.

== Administration ==
Sariakandi Upazila is divided into Sariakandi Municipality and 12 union parishads: Bhelabari, Bohail, Chaluabari, Chandan Baisha, Fulbari, Hat Sherpur, Kamalpur, Karnibari, Kazla, Kutubpur, Narchi, and Sariakandi. The union parishads are subdivided into 100 mauzas and 173 villages.

Sariakandi Municipality is subdivided into 9 wards and 17 mahallas.

== Education ==
There are five colleges in the upazila. They include Chandan Baisha Degree College, founded in 1964, Chhaihata Degree College, and Shariakandi Degree College.

Jamthol Technical Management College, founded in 2001, is one of the upazila's two colleges in the technical and vocational education system.

The madrasa education system includes three fazil madrasas.

== See also ==
- Upazilas of Bangladesh
- Districts of Bangladesh
- Divisions of Bangladesh
