= Manikganj Sadar Upazila =

Manikgonj Sadar মানিকগঞ্জ সদর
- Upazila
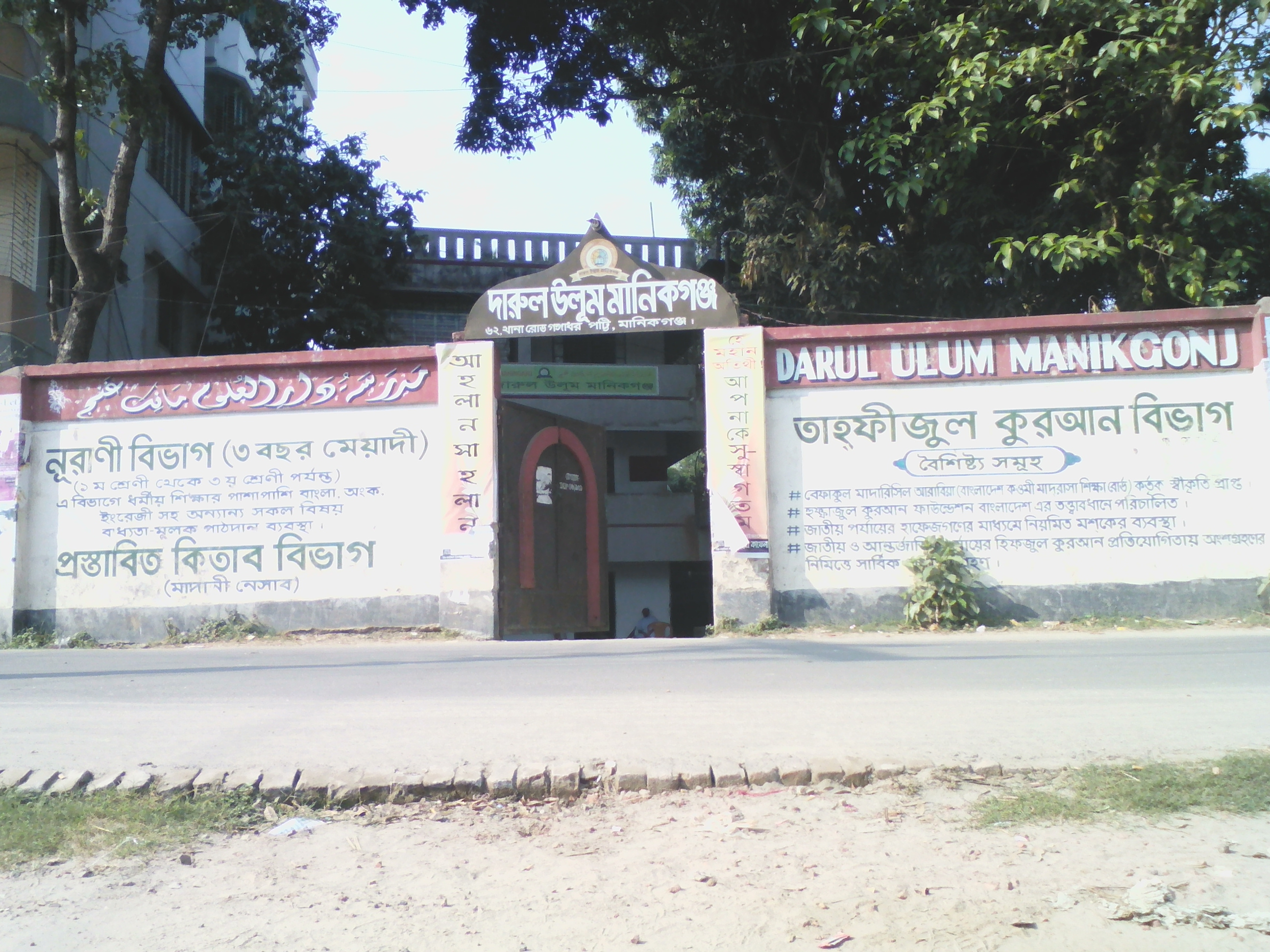
- Madrasa Darul Uloom Manikganj

- Coordinates: 23°51′N 90°0.7′E
- Country: Bangladesh
- Division: Dhaka
- District: Manikganj
- Headquarters: Manikganj

Area
  - Total: 214.81 km^{2} (82.94 sq mi)

Population (2022)
  - Total: 363,829
  - Density: 1,693.7/km^{2} (4,386.7/sq mi)
- Time zone: UTC+6 (BST)
- Postal code: 1800
- Area code: 0651
- Website: Official Map of Manikganj Sadar

Manikganj Sadar Upazila mauza geocode map

Manikgonj Sadar (Bengali: মানিকগঞ্জ সদর) is an upazila of Manikganj District in the division of Dhaka, Bangladesh.

== Geography ==
Manikgonj Sadar is located at 23.8500°N 90.0111°E. It has a total area of 214.81 km^{2}.

== Demographics ==
Historical population
Year	Pop. (000)	±%
1981	209	—
1991	237	+13.4%
2001	262	+10.5%
2011	309	+17.9%
2022	364	+17.8%
Source: Bangladesh Bureau of Statistics

Religions in Manikganj Sadar Upazila (2022)
Religion	Percent
Islam	90.11%
Hinduism	9.83%
Other or not stated	0.06%

According to the 2022 Bangladeshi census, Manikganj Sadar Upazila had 91,016 households and a population of 363,829. 7.68% of the population were under 5 years of age. Manikganj Sadar had a literacy rate (age 7 and over) of 77.11%: 79.72% for males and 74.73% for females, and a sex ratio of 92.29 males for every 100 females. 105,516 (29.00%) lived in urban areas.

At the 2011 Census of Bangladesh, Manikganj Sadar Upazila had 71,202 households and a population of 309,413. Out of the total, 61,587 inhabitants (19.90%) were under 10 years of age. Manikganj Sadar had a literacy rate (age 7 and over) of 56.01%, compared to the national average of 51.8%, and a sex ratio of 1071 females per 1000 males. 72,108 (23.30%) lived in urban areas.

== Sports ==
Manikganj Stadium is located by the Manikganj public library, Manikganj, Bangladesh.

== Administration ==
Manikganj Sadar Upazila is divided into Manikganj Municipality and ten union parishads: Atigram, Bhararia, Betila-Mitra, Dighi Union, Garpara, Hatipara, Jagir, Krishnapur, Nabagram, Putail. The union parishads are subdivided into 270 mauzas and 315 villages.

Manikganj Municipality is subdivided into 9 wards and 50 mahallas.

== Education ==
NPI University of Bangladesh, founded in 2015, is the only university. Manikganj Medical College, founded in 2014, is the only medical school.

There are 11 colleges in the upazila. They include Adarsha Degree Mohabidyalay Khabashpour, Khan Bahadur Awlad Hossain Khan College, and Manikgonj Government Mohilla College. Government Debendra College, founded in 1942, is the only master's level one.

According to Banglapedia, Atigram A. C. High School, founded in 1949, Garpara High School (1959), Hatipara M. L. High School (1967), Khabashpur Lavanya Prova High School (1941), Lemubari Binoda Sundary High School (1949), Manikganj Government High School (1884), Manikganj Model High School (1925), and Nabagram Union High School (1967) are notable secondary schools.

The madrasa education system includes one kamil madrasa.

Other educational institutions include Government Textile Vocational Institute Manikganj.

== See also ==
- Upazilas of Bangladesh
- Districts of Bangladesh
- Divisions of Bangladesh
