= Upazila =

Administrative divisions of Bangladesh

- Category: Administrative divisions
- Location: Bangladesh
- Created: 1982
- Number: 503
- Populations: Highest: 3,023,516 (Gazipur Sadar); Lowest: 26,932 (Juraichhari)
- Areas: Largest: 1,968.23 km^{2} (759.94 sq mi) (Shyamnagar); Smallest: 39.55 km^{2} (15.27 sq mi) (Shayestaganj)
- Government: Upazila Nirbahi Officer; UNO (Administrator); Upazila Parishad (Council); UP Chairman (Executive)
- Subdivisions: Union councils (4,599)

An upazila, (Note: Bengali: উপজেলা, romanized: upôjela, pronounced ['upoˌdʒela]; lit. 'sub-district') formerly called thana, is an administrative division in Bangladesh, functioning as a sub-unit of a district. It can be seen as an analogous to a county or a borough of Western countries. Rural upazilas are further administratively divided into union council areas (union parishads).

Bangladesh has 503 upazilas.The upazilas are the second lowest tier of regional administration in Bangladesh. The administrative structure consists of divisions (8), districts (64), upazilas (500) and union parishads (UPs). This system of devolution was introduced by the former military ruler and president of Bangladesh, Hossain Mohammad Ershad, in an attempt to strengthen local government.

Below UPs, villages (gram) and para exist, but these have no administrative power and elected members. The Local Government Ordinance of 1982 was amended a year later, redesignating and upgrading the existing thanas as upazilas.

== History ==
Upazilas were formerly known as thana, which literally means police station. Despite the meaning, thanas functioned much as an administrative and geographic region, much as today's upazilas. In 1982, thanas were re-termed to as upazilas with provisions for semi-autonomous local governance. This system was reverted to the thana system in 1992. Later in 1999, geographic regions under administrations of thanas were converted into upazilas. All administrative terms in this level were renamed from thana to upazila. For instance, thana nirbahi officer (lit. thana executive officer) was renamed upazila nirbahi officer (lit. upazila executive officer).

The word thana is now used to solely refer to police stations. Generally, there is one police station for each upazila, but larger administrative units may have more than one police station covering different regions. However, it was complicated again and currently, Upazilas which combinely form "Administrative Districts" are known as Thanas. For example: Panchlaish Thana, Double Mooring Thana under Chittagong district.

On 26 July 2021, Khandker Anwarul Islam announced the renaming of Dakshin Sunamganj Upazila to "Shantiganj Upazila" as well as the creation of three new upazilas; Eidgaon Upazila in Cox's Bazar District, Madhyanagar Upazila in Sunamganj District and Dasar Upazila in Madaripur District.

On 7 May, 2026, the government approved the creation of five new upazilas across three districts: Mokamtola Upazila in Bogura District, Matamuhuri Upazila in Cox's Bazar District, Chandraganj Upazila in Lakshmipur District, Ruhia Upazila and Bhully Upazila in Thakurgaon District, taking the total number of upazilas to 500, as well as approving the creation of Bogura City Corporation.

== Administration ==
=== Upazila nirbahi officer ===
Upazila nirbahi officer (UNO, or upazila executive officer; Bengali: উপজেলা নির্বাহী কর্মকর্তা) is a non-elected administrator in an upazila. UNOs are senior assistant secretary of Bangladesh Civil Service (Administration) Cadre. They act as executive officer of the upazila under the elected posts.

=== Upazila parishad ===
Each upazila parishad (or council) has a chairperson called chairman, a vice-chairman and a woman vice-chairman. All three are elected through direct popular election. Union parishad chairmen within the upazila are considered as the members of the porishod. The post of a woman vice-chairman was created to ensure at least one-third woman representation in the all elected posts of the local government.

On 22 January 2010, the first election in 18 years of upazila porishod was held.

== Lists of upazilas ==
List of upazilas in Rajshahi Division

District	Upazila
Bogura District	1. Adamdighi Upazila; 2. Bogura Sadar Upazila; 3. Dhunat Upazila; 4. Dhupchanchia Upazila; 5. Gabtali Upazila; 6. Kahaloo Upazila; 7. Nandigram Upazila; 8. Sariakandi Upazila; 9. Shajahanpur Upazila; 10. Sherpur Upazila; 11. Shibganj Upazila; 12. Sonatola Upazila; 13. Mokamtola Upazila
Chapai Nawabganj District	1. Bholahat Upazila; 2. Gomastapur Upazila; 3. Nachole Upazila; 4. Nawabganj Sadar Upazila; 5. Shibganj Upazila
Joypurhat District	1. Akkelpur Upazila; 2. Joypurhat Sadar Upazila; 3. Kalai Upazila; 4. Khetlal Upazila; 5. Panchbibi Upazila
Naogaon District	1. Atrai Upazila; 2. Badalgachhi Upazila; 3. Dhamoirhat Upazila; 4. Manda Upazila; 5. Mohadevpur Upazila; 6. Naogaon Sadar Upazila; 7. Niamatpur Upazila; 8. Patnitala Upazila; 9. Porsha Upazila; 10. Raninagar Upazila; 11. Sapahar Upazila
Natore District	1. Bagatipara Upazila; 2. Baraigram Upazila; 3. Gurudaspur Upazila; 4. Lalpur Upazila; 5. Naldanga Upazila; 6. Natore Sadar Upazila; 7. Singra Upazila
Pabna District	1. Atgharia Upazila; 2. Bera Upazila; 3. Bhangura Upazila; 4. Chatmohar Upazila; 5. Faridpur Upazila; 6. Ishwardi Upazila; 7. Pabna Sadar Upazila; 8. Santhia Upazila; 9. Sujanagar Upazila
Rajshahi District	1. Bagha Upazila; 2. Bagmara Upazila; 3. Charghat Upazila; 4. Durgapur Upazila; 5. Godagari Upazila; 6. Mohanpur Upazila; 7. Paba Upazila; 8. Puthia Upazila; 9. Tanore Upazila
Sirajganj District	1. Belkuchi Upazila; 2. Chauhali Upazila; 3. Kamarkhanda Upazila; 4. Kazipur Upazila; 5. Raiganj Upazila; 6. Shahjadpur Upazila; 7. Sirajganj Sadar Upazila; 8. Tarash Upazila; 9. Ullahpara Upazila

List of upazilas in Rangpur Division

District	Upazila
Dinajpur District	1. Biral Upazila; 2. Birampur Upazila; 3. Birganj Upazila; 4. Bochaganj Upazila; 5. Chirirbandar Upazila; 6. Dinajpur Sadar Upazila; 7. Ghoraghat Upazila; 8. Hakimpur Upazila; 9. Kaharole Upazila; 10. Khansama Upazila; 11. Nawabganj Upazila; 12. Parbatipur Upazila; 13. Phulbari Upazila
Gaibandha District	1. Gaibandha Sadar Upazila; 2. Gobindaganj Upazila; 3. Palashbari Upazila; 4. Phulchhari Upazila; 5. Sadullapur Upazila; 6. Sughatta Upazila; 7. Sundarganj Upazila
Kurigram District	1. Bhurungamari Upazila; 2. Char Rajibpur Upazila; 3. Chilmari Upazila; 4. Kurigram Sadar Upazila; 5. Nageshwari Upazila; 6. Phulbari Upazila; 7. Rajarhat Upazila; 8. Raomari Upazila; 9. Ulipur Upazila
Lalmonirhat District	1. Aditmari Upazila; 2. Hatibandha Upazila; 3. Kaliganj Upazila; 4. Lalmonirhat Sadar Upazila; 5. Patgram Upazila
Nilphamari District	1. Dimla Upazila; 2. Domar Upazila; 3. Jaldhaka Upazila; 4. Kishoreganj Upazila; 5. Nilphamari Sadar Upazila; 6. Saidpur Upazila
Panchagarh District	1. Atwari Upazila; 2. Boda Upazila; 3. Debiganj Upazila; 4. Panchagarh Sadar Upazila; 5. Tetulia Upazila
Rangpur District	1. Badarganj Upazila; 2. Gangachhara Upazila; 3. Kaunia Upazila; 4. Mithapukur Upazila; 5. Pirgachha Upazila; 6. Pirganj Upazila; 7. Rangpur Sadar Upazila; 8. Taraganj Upazila
Thakurgaon District	1. Baliadangi Upazila; 2. Haripur Upazila; 3. Pirganj Upazila; 4. Ranisankail Upazila; 5. Thakurgaon Sadar Upazila; 6. Ruhia Upazila; 7. Bhully Upazila

List of upazilas in Mymensingh Division

District	Upazila
Jamalpur District	1. Baksiganj Upazila; 2. Dewanganj Upazila; 3. Islampur Upazila; 4. Jamalpur Sadar Upazila; 5. Madarganj Upazila; 6. Melandaha Upazila; 7. Sarishabari Upazila
Mymensingh District	1. Bhaluka Upazila; 2. Dhobaura Upazila; 3. Fulbaria Upazila; 4. Gafargaon Upazila; 5. South Gafargaon Upazila; 6. Gauripur Upazila; 7. Haluaghat Upazila; 8. Ishwarganj Upazila; 9. Muktagachha Upazila; 10. Mymensingh Sadar Upazila; 11. Nandail Upazila; 12. Phulpur Upazila; 13. Tara Khanda Upazila; 14. Trishal Upazila
Netrokona District	1. Atpara Upazila; 2. Barhatta Upazila; 3. Durgapur Upazila; 4. Kalmakanda Upazila; 5. Khaliajuri Upazila; 6. Kendua Upazila; 7. Madan Upazila; 8. Mohanganj Upazila; 9. Netrokona Sadar Upazila; 10. Purbadhala Upazila
Sherpur District	1. Jhenaigati Upazila; 2. Nakla Upazila; 3. Nalitabari Upazila; 4. Sherpur Sadar Upazila; 5. Sreebardi Upazila

List of upazilas in Barisal Division

District	Upazila
Barguna District	1. Amtali Upazila; 2. Bamna Upazila; 3. Barguna Sadar Upazila; 4. Betagi Upazila; 5. Patharghata Upazila; 6. Taltali Upazila
Barisal District	1. Agailjhara Upazila; 2. Babuganj Upazila; 3. Bakerganj Upazila; 4. Banaripara Upazila; 5. Barisal Sadar Upazila; 6. Gaurnadi Upazila; 7. Hizla Upazila; 8. Mehendiganj Upazila; 9. Muladi Upazila; 10. Wazirpur Upazila
Bhola District	1. Bhola Sadar Upazila; 2. Burhanuddin Upazila; 3. Char Fasson Upazila; 4. Daulatkhan Upazila; 5. Lalmohan Upazila; 6. Manpura Upazila; 7. Tazumuddin Upazila
Jhalokati District	1. Jhalokati Sadar Upazila; 2. Kathalia Upazila; 3. Nalchity Upazila; 4. Rajapur Upazila
Patuakhali District	1. Bauphal Upazila; 2. Dashmina Upazila; 3. Dumki Upazila; 4. Galachipa Upazila; 5. Kalapara Upazila; 6. Mirzaganj Upazila; 7. Patuakhali Sadar Upazila; 8. Rangabali Upazila
Pirojpur District	1. Bhandaria Upazila; 2. Indurkani Upazila; 3. Kawkhali Upazila; 4. Mathbaria Upazila; 5. Nazirpur Upazila; 6. Nesarabad (Swarupkati) Upazila; 7. Pirojpur Sadar Upazila

List of upazilas in Chittagong Division

District	Upazila
Bandarban District	1. Ali Kadam Upazila; 2. Bandarban Sadar Upazila; 3. Lama Upazila; 4. Naikhongchhari Upazila; 5. Rowangchhari Upazila; 6. Ruma Upazila; 7. Thanchi Upazila
Brahmanbaria District	1. Akhaura Upazila; 2. Bancharampur Upazila; 3. Brahmanbaria Sadar Upazila; 4. Kasba Upazila; 5. Nabinagar Upazila; 6. Nasirnagar Upazila; 7. Sarail Upazila; 8. Ashuganj Upazila; 9. Bijoynagar Upazila
Chandpur District	1. Chandpur Sadar Upazila; 2. Faridganj Upazila; 3. Haimchar Upazila; 4. Haziganj Upazila; 5. Kachua Upazila; 6. Matlab Dakshin Upazila; 7. Matlab Uttar Upazila; 8. Shahrasti Upazila
Chittagong District	1. Anwara Upazila; 2. Banshkhali Upazila; 3. Boalkhali Upazila; 4. Chandanaish Upazila; 5. Fatikchhari North Upazila; 6. Fatikchhari Upazila; 7. Hathazari Upazila; 8. Karnaphuli Upazila; 9. Lohagara Upazila; 10. Mirsharai Upazila; 11. Patiya Upazila; 12. Rangunia Upazila; 13. Raozan Upazila; 14. Sandwip Upazila; 15. Satkania Upazila; 16. Sitakunda Upazila
Cumilla District	1. Bangra Upazila; 2. Barura Upazila; 3. Brahmanpara Upazila; 4. Burichang Upazila; 5. Chandina Upazila; 6. Chauddagram Upazila; 7. Daudkandi Upazila; 8. Debidwar Upazila; 9. Homna Upazila; 10. Laksam Upazila; 11. Lalmai Upazila; 12. Muradnagar Upazila; 13. Nangalkot Upazila; 14. Cumilla Adarsha Sadar Upazila; 15. Meghna Upazila; 16. Titas Upazila; 17. Monohargonj Upazila; 18. Cumilla Sadar Dakshin Upazila
Cox's Bazar District	1. Chakaria Upazila; 2. Cox's Bazar Sadar Upazila; 3. Kutubdia Upazila; 4. Maheshkhali Upazila; 5. Ramu Upazila; 6. Teknaf Upazila; 7. Ukhia Upazila; 8. Pekua Upazila; 9. Eidgaon Upazila; 10. Matamuhuri Upazila
Feni District	1. Chhagalnaiya Upazila; 2. Daganbhuiyan Upazila; 3. Feni Sadar Upazila; 4. Parshuram Upazila; 5. Sonagazi Upazila; 6. Fulgazi Upazila
Khagrachhari District	1. Dighinala Upazila; 2. Khagrachhari Sadar Upazila; 3. Lakshmichhari Upazila; 4. Mahalchhari Upazila; 5. Manikchhari Upazila; 6. Matiranga Upazila; 7. Panchhari Upazila; 8. Ramgarh Upazila; 9. Guimara Upazila
Lakshmipur District	1. Lakshmipur Sadar Upazila; 2. Raipur Upazila; 3. Ramganj Upazila; 4. Ramgati Upazila; 5. Kamalnagar Upazila; 6. Chandraganj Upazila
Noakhali District	1. Begumganj Upazila; 2. Noakhali Sadar Upazila; 3. Chatkhil Upazila; 4. Companiganj Upazila; 5. Hatiya Upazila; 6. Senbagh Upazila; 7. Sonaimuri Upazila; 8. Subarnachar Upazila; 9. Kabirhat Upazila
Rangamati District	1. Bagaichhari Upazila; 2. Barkal Upazila; 3. Kawkhali Upazila; 4. Belaichhari Upazila; 5. Kaptai Upazila; 6. Juraichhari Upazila; 7. Langadu Upazila; 8. Naniyachar Upazila; 9. Rajasthali Upazila; 10. Rangamati Sadar Upazila

List of upazilas in Dhaka Division

District	Upazila
Dhaka District	1. Dhamrai Upazila; 2. Dohar Upazila; 3. Keraniganj Upazila; 4. Nawabganj Upazila; 5. Savar Upazila
Faridpur District	1. Alfadanga Upazila; 2. Bhanga Upazila; 3. Boalmari Upazila; 4. Charbhadrasan Upazila; 5. Faridpur Sadar Upazila; 6. Madhukhali Upazila; 7. Nagarkanda Upazila; 8. Sadarpur Upazila; 9. Saltha Upazila
Gazipur District	1. Gazipur Sadar Upazila; 2. Kaliakair Upazila; 3. Kaliganj Upazila; 4. Kapasia Upazila; 5. Sreepur Upazila
Gopalganj District	1. Gopalganj Sadar Upazila; 2. Kashiani Upazila; 3. Kotalipara Upazila; 4. Muksudpur Upazila; 5. Tungipara Upazila
Kishoreganj District	1. Austagram Upazila; 2. Bajitpur Upazila; 3. Bhairab Upazila; 4. Hossainpur Upazila; 5. Itna Upazila; 6. Karimganj Upazila; 7. Katiadi Upazila; 8. Kishoreganj Sadar Upazila; 9. Kuliarchar Upazila; 10. Mithamain Upazila; 11. Nikli Upazila; 12. Pakundia Upazila; 13. Tarail Upazila
Madaripur District	1. Rajoir Upazila; 2. Madaripur Sadar Upazila; 3. Kalkini Upazila; 4. Shibchar Upazila; 5. Dasar Upazila
Manikganj District	1. Daulatpur Upazila; 2. Ghior Upazila; 3. Harirampur Upazila; 4. Manikgonj Sadar Upazila; 5. Saturia Upazila; 6. Shivalaya Upazila; 7. Singair Upazila
Munshiganj District	1. Gazaria Upazila; 2. Lohajang Upazila; 3. Munshiganj Sadar Upazila; 4. Sirajdikhan Upazila; 5. Sreenagar Upazila; 6. Tongibari Upazila
Narayanganj District	1. Araihazar Upazila; 2. Bandar Upazila; 3. Narayanganj Sadar Upazila; 4. Rupganj Upazila; 5. Sonargaon Upazila
Narsingdi District	1. Narsingdi Sadar Upazila; 2. Belabo Upazila; 3. Monohardi Upazila; 4. Palash Upazila; 5. Raipura Upazila; 6. Shibpur Upazila
Rajbari District	1. Baliakandi Upazila; 2. Goalandaghat Upazila; 3. Pangsha Upazila; 4. Rajbari Sadar Upazila; 5. Kalukhali Upazila
Shariatpur District	1. Bhedarganj Upazila; 2. Damudya Upazila; 3. Gosairhat Upazila; 4. Naria Upazila; 5. Shariatpur Sadar Upazila; 6. Zajira Upazila
Tangail District	1. Gopalpur Upazila; 2. Basail Upazila; 3. Bhuapur Upazila; 4. Delduar Upazila; 5. Ghatail Upazila; 6. Kalihati Upazila; 7. Madhupur Upazila; 8. Mirzapur Upazila; 9. Nagarpur Upazila; 10. Sakhipur Upazila; 11. Dhanbari Upazila; 12. Tangail Sadar Upazila

List of upazilas in Khulna Division

District	Upazila
Bagerhat District	1. Bagerhat Sadar Upazila; 2. Chitalmari Upazila; 3. Fakirhat Upazila; 4. Kachua Upazila; 5. Mollahat Upazila; 6. Mongla Upazila; 7. Morrelganj Upazila; 8. Rampal Upazila; 9. Sarankhola Upazila
Chuadanga District	1. Alamdanga Upazila; 2. Chuadanga Sadar Upazila; 3. Damurhuda Upazila; 4. Jibannagar Upazila
Jashore District	1. Abhaynagar Upazila; 2. Bagherpara Upazila; 3. Chaugachha Upazila; 4. Jhikargachha Upazila; 5. Keshabpur Upazila; 6. Jashore Sadar Upazila; 7. Manirampur Upazila; 8. Sharsha Upazila
Jhenaida District	1. Harinakunda Upazila; 2. Jhenaidah Sadar Upazila; 3. Kaliganj Upazila; 4. Kotchandpur Upazila; 5. Maheshpur Upazila; 6. Shailkupa Upazila
Khulna District	1. Batiaghata Upazila; 2. Dacope Upazila; 3. Dumuria Upazila; 4. Dighalia Upazila; 5. Koyra Upazila; 6. Paikgachha Upazila; 7. Phultala Upazila; 8. Rupsha Upazila; 9. Terokhada Upazila
Kushtia District	1. Bheramara Upazila; 2. Daulatpur Upazila; 3. Khoksa Upazila; 4. Kumarkhali Upazila; 5. Kushtia Sadar Upazila; 6. Mirpur Upazila
Magura District	1. Magura Sadar Upazila; 2. Mohammadpur Upazila; 3. Shalikha Upazila; 4. Sreepur Upazila
Meherpur District	1. Gangni Upazila; 2. Meherpur Sadar Upazila; 3. Mujibnagar Upazila
Narail District	1. Kalia Upazila; 2. Lohagara Upazila; 3. Narail Sadar Upazila
Satkhira District	1. Assasuni Upazila; 2. Debhata Upazila; 3. Kalaroa Upazila; 4. Kaliganj Upazila; 5. Satkhira Sadar Upazila; 6. Shyamnagar Upazila; 7. Tala Upazila

List of upazilas in Sylhet Division

District	Upazila
Habiganj District	1. Ajmiriganj Upazila; 2. Bahubal Upazila; 3. Baniyachong Upazila; 4. Chunarughat Upazila; 5. Habiganj Sadar Upazila; 6. Lakhai Upazila; 7. Madhabpur Upazila; 8. Nabiganj Upazila; 9. Shayestaganj Upazila
Moulvibazar District	1. Barlekha Upazila; 2. Juri Upazila; 3. Kamalganj Upazila; 4. Kulaura Upazila; 5. Moulvibazar Sadar Upazila; 6. Rajnagar Upazila; 7. Sreemangal Upazila
Sunamganj District	1. Bishwamvarpur Upazila; 2. Chhatak Upazila; 3. Shantiganj Upazila; 4. Derai Upazila; 5. Dharamapasha Upazila; 6. Dowarabazar Upazila; 7. Jagannathpur Upazila; 8. Jamalganj Upazila; 9. Sullah Upazila; 10. Sunamganj Sadar Upazila; 11. Tahirpur Upazila; 12. Madhyanagar Upazila
Sylhet District	1. Balaganj Upazila; 2. Beanibazar Upazila; 3. Bishwanath Upazila; 4. Companiganj Upazila; 5. Dakshin Surma Upazila; 6. Fenchuganj Upazila; 7. Golapganj Upazila; 8. Gowainghat Upazila; 9. Jaintiapur Upazila; 10. Kanaighat Upazila; 11. Osmani Nagar Upazila; 12. Sylhet Sadar Upazila; 13. Zakiganj Upazila

== See also ==
- Administrative geography of Bangladesh
- Divisions of Bangladesh
- Districts of Bangladesh
- Tehsil – a similar administrative subdivision used in India and Pakistan
- Unions of Bangladesh
- Villages of Bangladesh
- Upazilas of Bangladesh
