= Lalmonirhat-2 =

Bangladeshi parliamentary constituency

Coordinates: 25.97°N 89.22°E

- Constituency for the Jatiya Sangsad
- District: Lalmonirhat District
- Division: Rangpur Division
- Electorate: 432,964 (2026)

Current constituency
- Created: 1984
- Party: Bangladesh Nationalist Party
- Member: Rokon Uddin Babul
- ← 16 Lalmonirhat-1 18 Lalmonirhat-3 →

Lalmonirhat-2 is a constituency represented in the Jatiya Sangsad (National Parliament) of Bangladesh since 2026 by Rokon Uddin Babul of the Bangladesh Nationalist Party.

== Boundaries ==
The constituency encompasses Aditmari and Kaliganj upazilas.

== History ==
The constituency was created in 1984 from the Rangpur-6 constituency when the former Rangpur District was split into five districts: Nilphamari, Lalmonirhat, Rangpur, Kurigram, and Gaibandha.

== Members of Parliament ==
Election	Member	Party
1986	Mojibur Rahman	Jatiya Party
Feb 1996	Saleh Uddin Ahmed	Bangladesh Nationalist Party
Jun 1996	Mojibur Rahman	Jatiya Party
2001	Mojibur Rahman	Islami Jatiya Oikya Front
2008	Mojibur Rahman	Jatiya Party (Ershad)
2014	Nuruzzaman Ahmed	Awami League
2018	Nuruzzaman Ahmed	Awami League
2024	Nuruzzaman Ahmed	Awami League
2026	Rokon Uddin Babul	Bangladesh Nationalist Party

== Elections ==
=== Elections in the 2020s ===
General Election 2026: Lalmonirhat-2
Party	Candidate	Votes	%	±%
BNP	Rokon Uddin Babul	123,946	45.3	N/A
Jamaat	Firoz Haider	117,252	42.8	N/A
Janotar Dol	Shamim Kamal	20,127	7.4	N/A
IAB	Mahfuzur Rahman	6,939	2.5	N/A
Independent	Momtaz Ali	3,499	1.3	N/A
CPB	Nimal Chandra Roy	1,089	0.4	N/A
JP(E)	Elhan Uddin	810	0.3	N/A
Majority		6,694	2.4	N/A
Turnout		273,662	63.2	N/A
Registered electors		432,964		
BNP gain from AL				

=== Elections in the 2010s ===
Nuruzzaman Ahmed was elected unopposed in the 2014 general election after opposition parties withdrew their candidacies in a boycott of the election.

=== Elections in the 2000s ===
General Election 2008: Lalmonirhat-2
Party	Candidate	Votes	%	±%
JP(E)	Mojibur Rahman	161,677	69.4	N/A
BNP	Saleh Uddin Ahmed	61,599	26.4	+2.2
IAB	Md. Ebrahim Hossain Khan	9,692	4.2	N/A
Majority		100,078	43.0	+41.2
Turnout		232,968	86.6	+14.3
JP(E) gain from IJOF				

General Election 2001: Lalmonirhat-2
Party	Candidate	Votes	%	±%
IJOF	Mojibur Rahman	60,468	34.5	N/A
Independent	Nuruzzaman Ahmed	57,265	32.7	N/A
BNP	Saleh Uddin Ahmed	42,298	24.2	+13.7
AL	Md. Emdadul Haque Chowdhury	14,309	8.2	−28.1
Jatiya Party (M)	Hasan Shahid Monju	787	0.4	N/A
Majority		3,203	1.8	−4.1
Turnout		175,127	72.3	+2.2
IJOF gain from JP(E)				

=== Elections in the 1990s ===
General Election June 1996: Lalmonirhat-2
Party	Candidate	Votes	%	±%
JP(E)	Mojibur Rahman	57,804	42.2	−4.1
AL	Nuruzzaman Ahmed	49,683	36.3	−1.6
BNP	Md. Abdul Mannan Sarkar	14,399	10.5	+4.7
Jamaat	Md. Samsul Haque	11,713	8.5	+0.7
Independent	Md. Fazlur Rahman	2,302	1.7	N/A
Gano Forum	Md. Emdadul Haque	709	0.5	N/A
Zaker Party	Md. Rezaul Karim Manik	402	0.3	−0.1
Majority		8,121	5.9	−2.5
Turnout		137,012	70.1	+15.0
JP(E) hold				

General Election 1991: Lalmonirhat-2
Party	Candidate	Votes	%	±%
JP(E)	Mojibur Rahman	51,755	46.3	
AL	Shamsul Islam	42,413	37.9	
Jamaat	Md. Abdul Wares	8,715	7.8	
BNP	Abdul Hamid	6,474	5.8	
IOJ	Md. Sultan Ahmed	1,352	1.2	
Zaker Party	Md. Kazi Altafur Rahman	447	0.4	
WPB	Md. Kamrul Hasan Siddique	341	0.3	
Independent	Shree Jitindro Nath	294	0.3	
Majority		9,342	8.4	
Turnout		111,791	55.1	
JP(E) hold				
