= Motahar Hossain (Bangladeshi politician) =

Bangladeshi politician

- মোতাহার হোসেন

Member of the Bangladesh Parliament for Lalmonirhat-1
- In office 28 October 2001 – 6 August 2024
- Preceded by: Joynal Abedin Sarker
- Succeeded by: Hasan Rajib Prodhan

State minister of Primary and Mass Education
- In office 2009–2014

Personal details
- Born: 19 December 1948 (age 77)
- Party: Bangladesh Awami League

Motahar Hossain (born 19 December 1948) is a Bangladesh Awami League politician and a former Jatiya Sangsad member representing the Lalmonirhat-1 constituency during 2001–2024. He served as the state minister of primary and mass education during 2009–2014.

== Career ==
Motahar is the present chairperson of the parliamentary standing committee on primary and mass education ministry. He is the president of the Bangladesh Awami League Lalmonirhat District unit. He served as the state minister of primary and mass education from 2009. After being appointed state minister, he said Bangladesh will remove illiteracy by 2012. In 2013, he was confined in the Lalmonirhat District auditorium by members of the Bangladesh Awami League over the formation of the Lalmonirhat Sadar Upazila committee of the Bangladesh Awami League. In 2014, he defeated Hussain Muhammad Ershad to win the Lalmonirhat-1 constituency in the 10th Bangladesh general election.

== Controversy ==
Motahar, chairperson of the parliamentary standing committee on primary and mass education ministry, on 20 December 2017, claimed that the government of Bangladesh could not be held responsible for the leak of school exam papers. He filed a defamation suit against the editor and publisher of Bangladesh Pratidin, Naem Nizam and Moynal Hossain Chowdhury, respectively, over a news item in the paper on 9 April 2014 titled Sabekder Amalnama: Ration Dealer Sabek Protimontri Motaharer Shato Koti Taka. Lalmonirhat Cognizance Court-4, Judge Md Afaz Uddin, issued an arrest warrant against the accused on 11 January 2018. The duo secured an anticipatory bail from the Bangladesh High Court on 15 January 2018.
