= Gilabari Mosque =

Ancient mosque in Gilabari, Lalmonirhat, Bangladesh

Coordinates: 25°54′41.7″N 89°23′42.9″E

- গিলাবাড়ি মসজিদ

Religion
- Affiliation: Islam
- Branch/tradition: Sunni
- District: Lalmonirhat
- Status: Active

Location
- Location: Gilabari, Saptibari Union
- Country: Bangladesh
- Interactive map of Gilabari Mosque

Architecture
- Style: Mughal

Specifications
- Direction of façade: East
- Capacity: 40
- Length: 42 Feet
- Width: 17 Feet
- Dome: 3
- Minaret: 15

Gilabari Mosque (Bengali: গিলাবাড়ি মসজিদ) is a congregational mosque built in Mughal architectural style. The religious establishment is located in Gilabari village of Saptibari Union, Aditmari Upazila, Lalmonirhat. Inside this mosque, forty people can offer prayers in two rows. The Department of Archaeology of Bangladesh has listed it as Gilabari Historical Ancient Mosque (Bengali: গিলাবাড়ি ঐতিহাসিক প্রাচীন মসজিদ), a protected heritage site.

== History ==
The exact construction date of the mosque is unknown, but the architectural features are of the Mughal style, which indicates that the mosque was built during the Mughal period. For preservation and restoration, during the Pakistan period, the exterior walls of the mosque were plastered once, and after independence, under Bangladesh's administration, the mosque's exterior walls were plastered and lime-washed several times. On August 1, 2022, through a notification, the mosque was declared a protected heritage site.

== Description ==
Gilabari Mosque is constructed in a rectangular land plan over approximately seven decimal of land, including the courtyard. The main building has a length of about 42 feet and a width of 17 feet. It has a total of 12 minarets, including three large domes. There are an additional three minarets at the main entrance of the mosque. The construction materials used include flat bricks, lime, and a mixture of brick mortar, which exhibit characteristics of Mughal masonry. Upon entry, an ancient well still stands in front of the main courtyard. Over time, the main foundation of the mosque has sunk about 3 feet below the ground level.
