= Saleh Uddin Ahmed =

Bangladesh Nationalist Party politician

- সালেহ উদ্দিন আহমেদ

Member of Parliament for Lalmonirhat-2
- In office 15 February 1996 – 12 June 1996
- Preceded by: Mojibur Rahman
- Succeeded by: Mojibur Rahman

Personal details
- Born: Lalmonirhat District
- Party: Bangladesh Nationalist Party

Saleh Uddin Ahmed is a Bangladesh Nationalist Party politician. He was elected a member of parliament for Lalmonirhat-2 in February 1996.

== Career ==
Hasan was elected to parliament for Lalmonirhat-2 as a Bangladesh Nationalist Party candidate in the 15 February 1996 Bangladeshi general election. He was defeated for Lalmonirhat-1 constituency in 2001 and 2008 on the nomination of Bangladesh Nationalist Party.
