= Lalmonirhat Government College =

College of Bangladesh

Coordinates: 25.9105°N 89.4205°E

- লালমনিরহাট সরকারি কলেজ
- Type: Public
- Established: 1964; 62 years ago
- Affiliations: National University of Bangladesh; Dinajpur Education Board
- Principal: Abu Bakar Siddique
- Academic staff: 56
- Administrative staff: 32
- Students: 8471
- Undergraduates: 6567
- Postgraduates: 1052
- Other students: 852
- Location: 1/822 Patgram Road, Talukkhutamara, Lalmonirhat, 5500, Bangladesh
- Campus: 22.6 acres (9.1 ha); Urban
- Language: Bengali
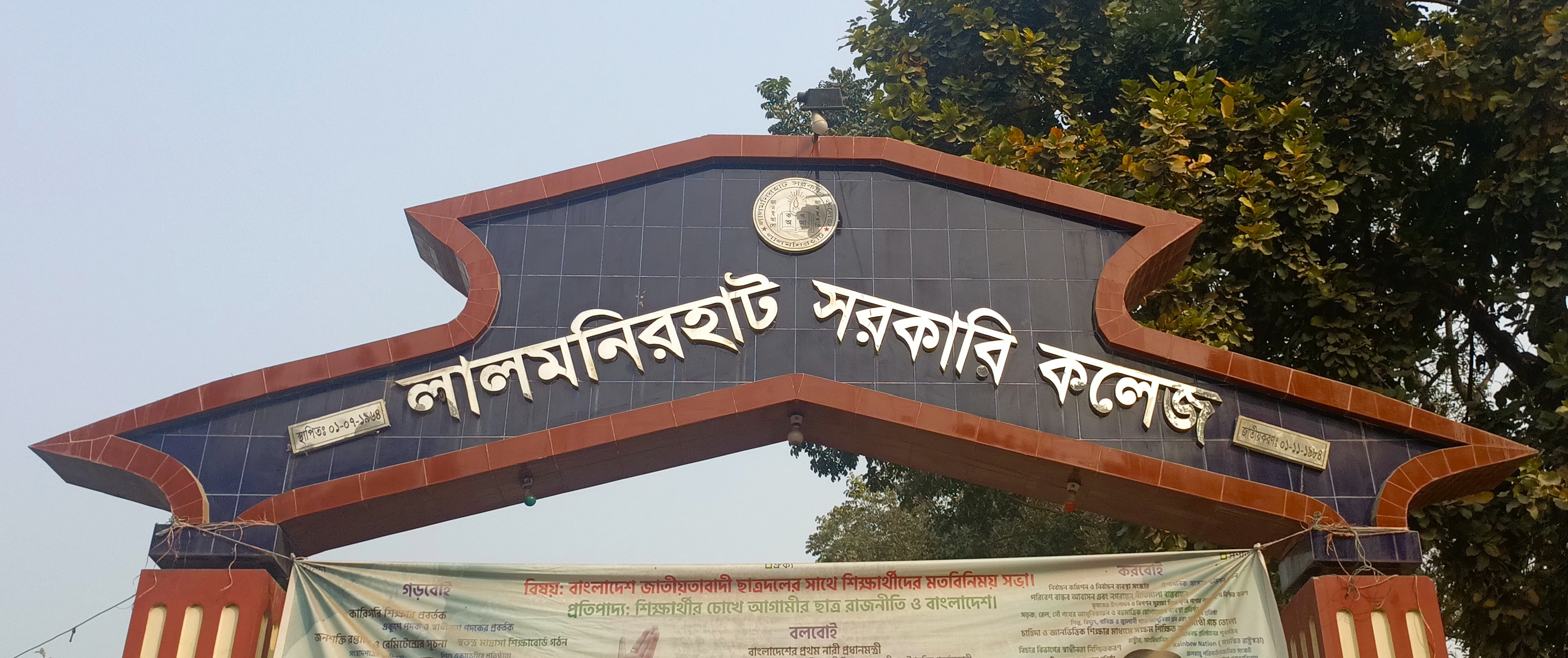

Lalmonirhat Government College is an institution of higher education in Bangladesh. It is located in Lalmonirhat Sadar Upazila. It is situated in the Taluk Khutamara area in the heart of the city and was established in 1964. Currently, the college offers education in science, humanities, and commerce at the higher secondary level. Additionally, it provides bachelor's (pass) courses, bachelor's (honors) courses in 10 subjects, and master's courses in 7 subjects. According to 2024 data, a total of 8,471 students are enrolled here.

== History ==
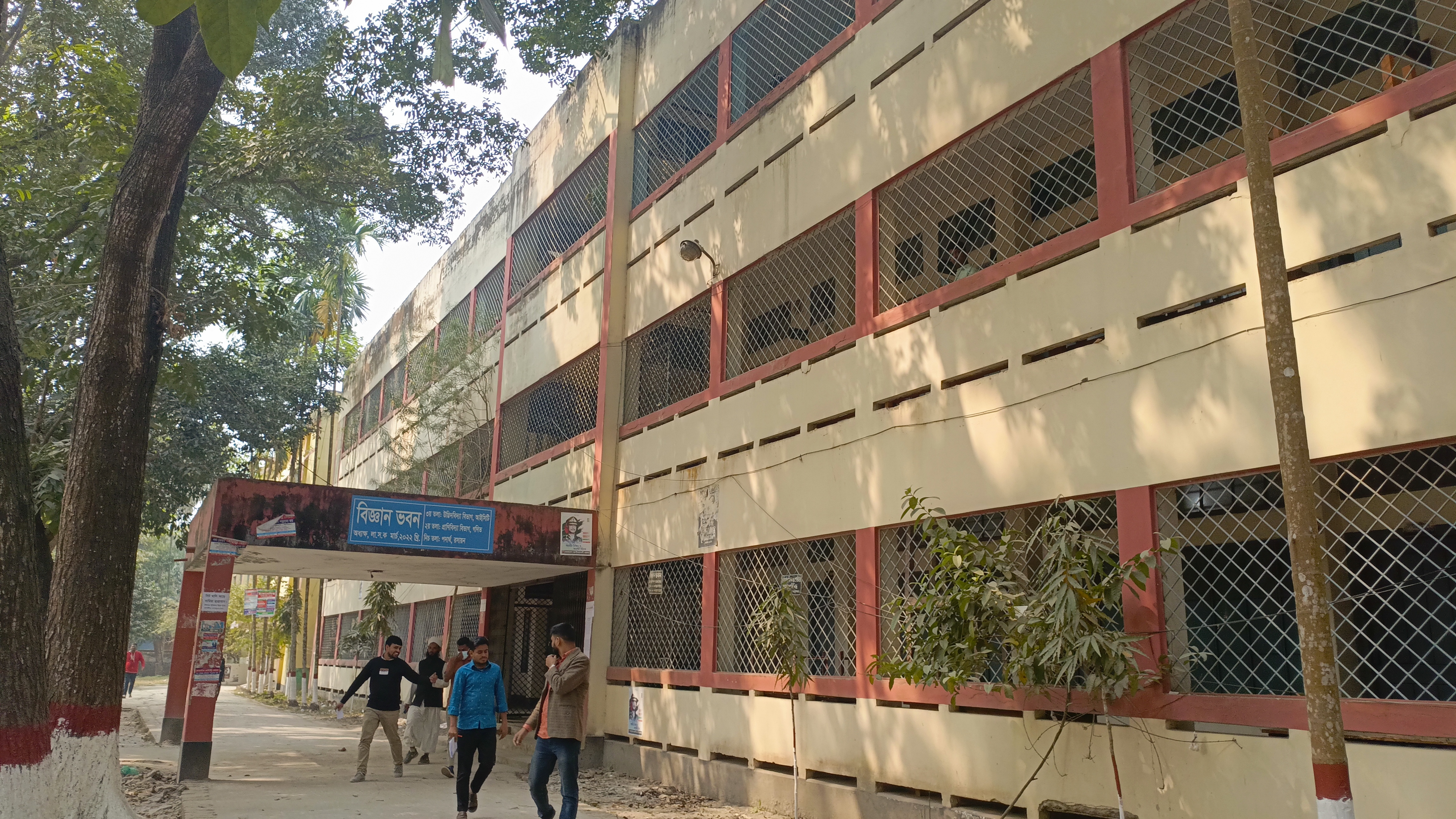
Science Building

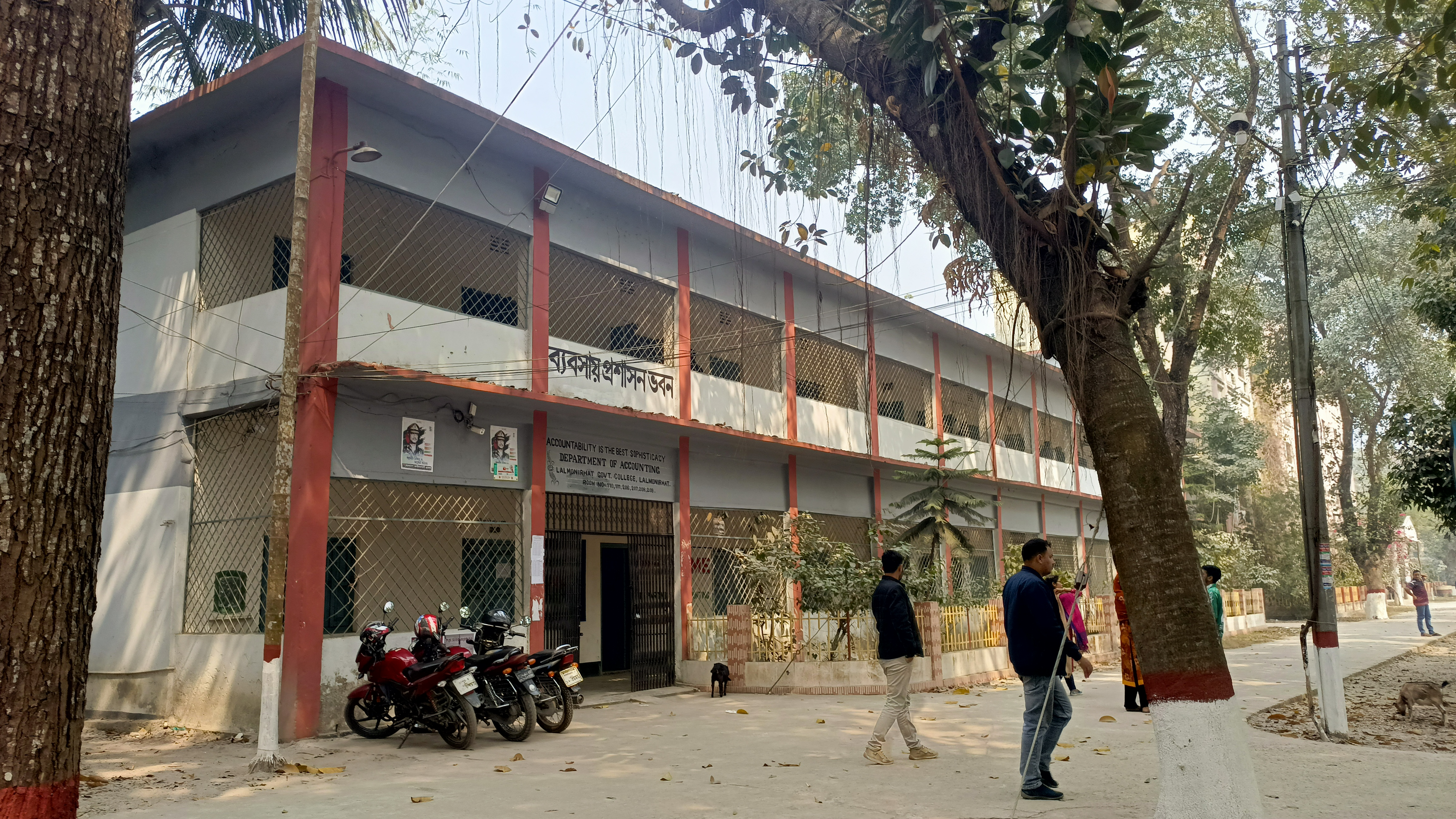
Business Administration Building

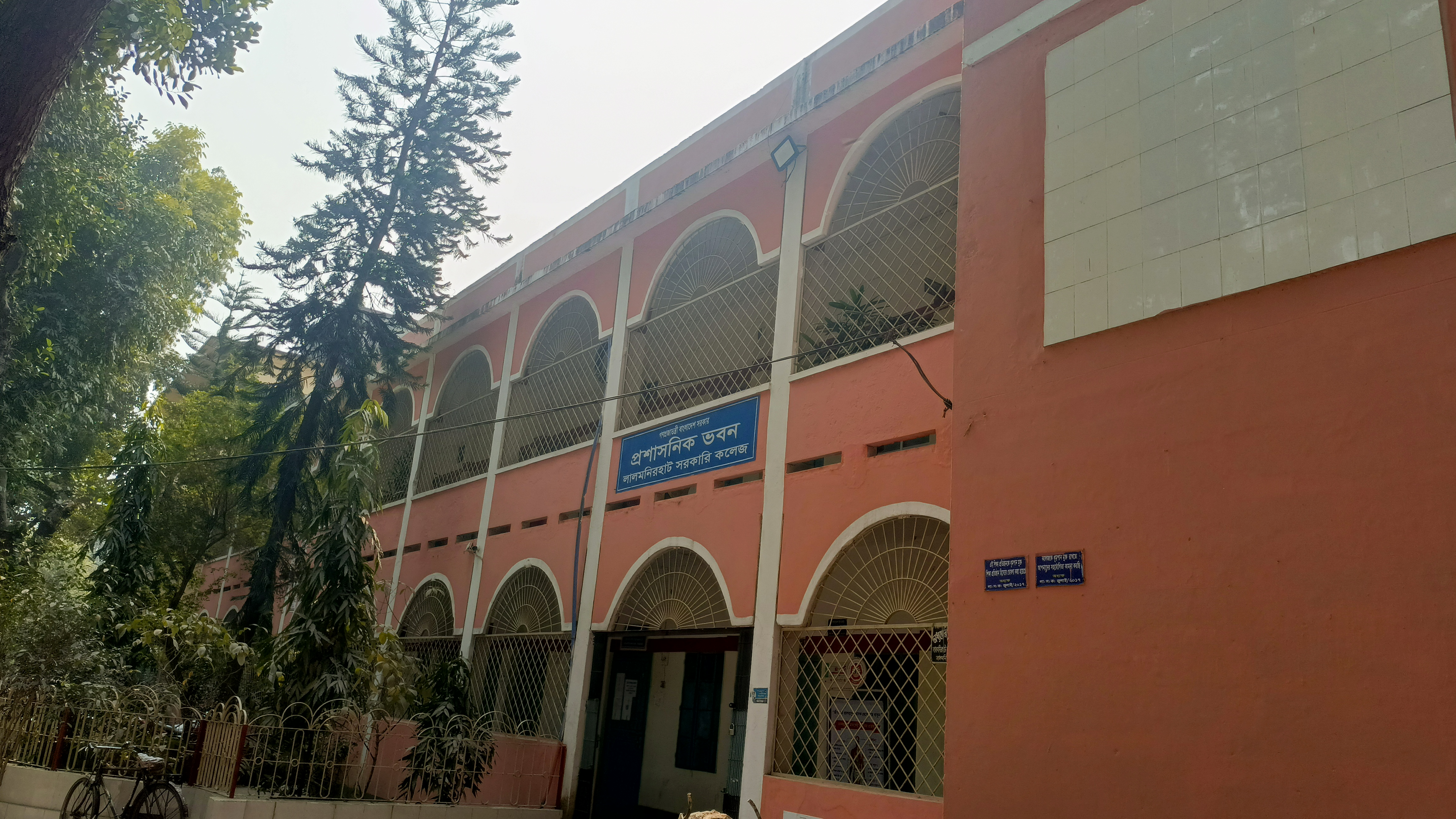
Administrative Building

Lalmonirhat College was established on 1 July 1964. Renting a single tin shade room from current Lalmonirhat Govt Girls High School (before non-govt) the journey of the college begun. Later in the year 1971, Lalmonirhat College was shifted to a new premises (current). On 1 November 1984, the college was nationalizated.

Currently about 8,471 HSC, honors, and master's level students are enrolled in the college in regular and irregular session, 852 of them being HSC students. Number of teachers is more than 30. There are three main branches of study in this college: science, arts and commerce.

== Course information ==
=== Higher secondary ===
- Science
- Humanities
- Commerce

=== Bachelor degree (pass) ===
1. B. A. (Pass)
2. B. S. S. (Pass)
3. B. Sc. (Pass)
4. B. B. S. (Pass)
5. C.C

=== Bachelor degree honours ===
1. Bengali
2. History
3. Islamic history and culture
4. Philosophy
5. Political science
6. Economics
7. Accounting
8. Management
9. Botany
10. Zoology

=== Masters Final ===
1. Bengali
2. History
3. Islamic history and culture
4. Philosophy
5. Political science
6. Accounting
7. Management

== Ranking ==
In the National University's college rankings of 2015 and 2017, it was recognized as one of the top colleges in the Rangpur region.

== Notable people ==
- Asadul Habib Dulu (birth 1957) Politician and 2th Jatiya Sangsad members
