= Hasan Rajib Prodhan =

Bangladeshi politician

Hasan Rajib Pradhan
- Incumbent
- Assumed office 17 february 2026
- Preceded by: Motahar Hossain

Member of Parliament for Lalmonirhat-1

Personal details
- Born: July 1, 1966 (age 59) Lalmonirhat District, Bangladesh
- Party: Bangladesh Nationalist Party
- Occupation: Politician
- Profession: Lawyer

Hasan Rajib Pradhan is a Bangladeshi politician and lawyer. He was elected as a Member of Parliament from the Lalmonirhat-1 constituency in the 13th National Parliamentary Election in 2026 as a candidate of the Bangladesh Nationalist Party (BNP).

== Early life ==
Hasan Rajib Pradhan was born on 1 July 1966 in a prominent Pradhan family of Srirampur Union, Patgram Upazila. He was professionally associated with the legal profession and later became actively involved in politics.

== Political career ==
Hasan Rajib Pradhan has long been associated with local politics. He has played an active role in the politics of the Bangladesh Nationalist Party.

In the 2026 National Parliamentary Election, he contested in the Lalmonirhat-1 (Patgram–Hatibandha) constituency with the party symbol “Sheaf of Paddy” and was elected.

During the election campaign, incidents of political tension and clashes in different areas of Lalmonirhat District were reported in the media.
