= Kaliganj Upazila =

Kaliganj Upazila may refer to:

- Kaliganj Upazila, Gazipur
- Kaliganj Upazila, Jhenaidah
- Kaliganj Upazila, Satkhira
- Kaliganj Upazila, Lalmonirhat
