= Sheikh Reyazuddin Ahmed =

Bengali author and social worker

Sheikh Reyazuddin Ahmed (Bengali: শেখ রিয়াজউদ্দিন আহমেদ; 1882 – 25 June 1972) was a Bengali author and social worker.

== Early life ==
Sheikh Reyazuddin Ahmed was born into a Bengali Muslim family of Sheikhs in the village of Dalgram, Kaliganj, Lalmonirhat, Rangpur. His father was Sheikh Zaynullah and his mother was Sheikh Ful Begum. His father initially had him pursue education at home, hiring Maulana Abdul Lateef to teach him the Arabic and Persian languages, a tradition of old Muslim families of Bengal. After this early stage of education, he studied at Kakina Mahimaranjan Primary School, and later went on to gain entrance at Rangpur Zilla School. Unfortunately, Sheikh Reyazuddin Ahmed had become ill during the time of his matriculation, and could not sit for all the exams.

== Career ==
In 1910, Reyazuddin Ahmed started his career as a teacher at Tushbander English Middle School. In 1918, he had become the Kazi i.e. the marriage registrar of his area, after that he had gone about participating in social activities in his region. He was the chairman of his union board for 12 years and was a member of the local board for 6 years. Sheikh Reyazuddin Ahmed had advocated for several social advancements in his region, he had established many educational institutions, charities, etc. He was also a skilled player of Lathi, a stick fighting game.

== Published works ==
Sheikh Reyazuddin Ahmed gathered fame after authoring Arab Jatir Itihas, a book about the history of the Arabs in 3 volumes. The Bangla Academy republished the book in a single volume in 1964. He also authored other books such as Mahatma Sir Sayed (A book on Sayed Ahmed), Jib Hayater Korbani (A book on animal sacrifice), and Islam Procharer Itihas (A book on the spread of Islam).
