= Hasanuzzaman Hasan =

Bangladesh Nationalist Party politician

- হাসানুজ্জামান হাসান

Member of Parliament from Lalmonirhat-1
- In office 15 February 1996 – 12 June 1996
- Preceded by: Joynal Abedin Sarker
- Succeeded by: Joynal Abedin Sarker

Personal details
- Born: Lalmonirhat District
- Died: 24 August 2021 (aged 65) Dinajpur, Bangladesh
- Party: Bangladesh Nationalist Party
- Children: 2 sons

Hasanuzzaman Hasan was a Bangladesh Nationalist Party politician. He was elected a member of parliament from Lalmonirhat-1 in February 1996.

== Career ==
Hasan was elected to parliament from Lalmonirhat-1 as a Bangladesh Nationalist Party candidate in the February 1996 Bangladeshi general election. He stood for reelection unsuccessfully on 12 June 1996.

Hasan died on 24 August 2021, aged 65.
