= Aditmari Upazila =

Aditmari আদিতমারী
- Upazila
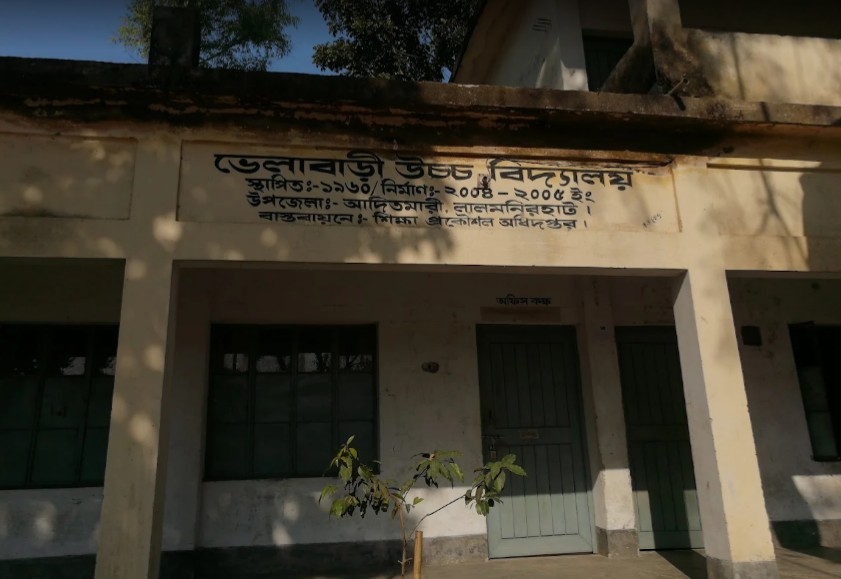
- Bhelabari High School, Aditmari

- Coordinates: 25°55.5′N 89°21′E
- Country: Bangladesh
- Division: Rangpur
- District: Lalmonirhat

Government
  - Upazila Chairman: Faruq Imrul Qais
  - MP (Lalmonirhat-2): Nuruzzaman Ahmed

Area
  - Total: 195.03 km^{2} (75.30 sq mi)

Population (2022)
  - Total: 251,229
  - Density: 1,288.2/km^{2} (3,336.3/sq mi)
- Time zone: UTC+6 (BST)
- Postal code: 5510
- Website: aditmari.lalmonirhat.gov.bd

Aditmari Upazila mauza geocode map

Aditmari (Bengali: আদিতমারী) is the smallest upazila (sub-district) of Lalmonirhat District in Rangpur Division, Bangladesh.

== Geography ==
Aditmari is located at 25.9250°N 89.3500°E. It has a total area of 195.03 km^{2}.

== History ==
Aditmari was historically a part of Kaliganj thana. This area was formerly part of a chakla governed by Indra Narayan Chakravarti during the reign of Maharaja Madan (Moda) Narayan (1665–1680) of Koch Bihar. Ibadat Khan, the Mughal faujdar of Ghoraghat, led an expedition against Koch Bihar in 1687, incorporating the region into the Bengal Subah once again. Nawab Nuruddin Muhammad Baqer Jang, his minister, Raja Dayashil of Qadamtala (Moinpur) and local supporters were punished by the forces of Captain McDonald in this area, which came to be known by the locals as "Aadatmara". It later got corrupted to Aditmari.

On 10 April 1981, the government of Bangladesh established a thana in Aditmari, taking eight unions from Kaliganj thana. The status of Aditmari thana was upgraded to upazila (sub-district) on 7 November 1983, as part of the President of Bangladesh Hussain Muhammad Ershad's decentralisation programme.

During the Bangladesh Liberation War of 1971, Aditmari thana was under Sector No. 6 led by Khademul Bashar. Several houses in Aditmari were set on fire by the Pakistan Army on 4 April. The army executed innocent civilians in Lalpur, which is located to the east of Aditmari railway station. A mass grave can be found in Batrish Hazari High School field. The area was liberated by Bengali freedom fighters on 6 December.

== Demographics ==
Religions in Aditmari Upazila (2022)
| Religion | Percent |
| Islam | 83.96% |
| Hinduism | 16.02% |
| Other or not stated | 0.02% |

According to the 2022 Bangladeshi census, Aditmari Upazila had 60,721 households and a population of 251,229. 9.49% of the population were under 5 years of age. Aditmari had a literacy rate (age 7 and over) of 70.34%: 73.96% for males and 66.81% for females, and a sex ratio of 98.77 males for every 100 females. 41,260 (16.42%) lived in urban areas.

According to the 2011 Census of Bangladesh, Aditmari Upazila had 52,144 households and a population of 224,796. 54,912 (24.43%) were under 10 years of age. Aditmari had a literacy rate (age 7 and over) of 45.06%, compared to the national average of 51.8%, and a sex ratio of 1003 females per 1000 males. 19,355 (8.61%) lived in urban areas.

As of the 1991 Bangladesh census, Aditmari has a population of 176760. Males constitute 51.22% of the population, and females 48.78%. This Upazila's eighteen up population is 84204. Aditmari has an average literacy rate of 18.6% (7+ years), and the national average of 32.4% literate.

== Administration ==
Aditmari Upazila is divided into eight union parishads: Bhadai, Bhelabari, Durgapur, Kamalabari, Mohishkhocha, Palashi, Saptibari, and Sarpukur. The union parishads are subdivided into 56 mauzas and 102 villages.

=== Upazila chairmen ===
List of chairmen
| Name | Notes |
|---|---|
Mojibur Rahman
Abdul Mannan Sarkar
Sirajul Hoque
| Faruq Imrul Qais | Present |

== Facilities and transportation ==
Aditmari is well connected with other parts of the country by road, river and train via the N509, Z5903, Z5904, Burimari–Lalmonirhat–Parbatipur line and the Dharla, Teesta and Sharnamati rivers. Aditmari has 525 mosques, most notably the Khetu Muhammad Sarkar Jame Mosque and Sher Mahmud Jame Mosque. There are 38 madrasas in Aditmari including the North Gobdha Dakhil Madrasa founded in 1986. There is also an orphanage and lillah boarding in Palashi, and a mazar (mausoleum) in Khatapara (Saptibari). Other than the Aditmari Central Graveyard, there are also Muslim cemeteries in Durgapur, Bhelabari, Kamlabari, Sarpukur, Saptibari, Bhadai, Palashi and Mahishkhocha.

List of madrasas
| Name | Est. | Notes |
|---|---|---|
| Jamiat-e-Talimul Quran (Qismat Charitabari) | 1960 | Founded by Abdul Awwal Sarkar, staff include Farid Uddin Masood |
| Aditmari Alim Madrasa | 1960 | |
| Bargharia Dakhil Madrasa | 1965 | |
| South Balapara Fazil Madrasa | 1970 | |
| Mahishkhocha D. S. Dakhil Madrasa | 1970 | |
| Raisbag Karamatia Dakhil Madrasa | 1975 | |
| Bhelabari Karamatia Dakhil Madrasa | 1976 | |
| Namuri D. S. Dakhil Madrasa | 1976 | |
| North Gobdha Dakhil Madrasa | 1986 | |
| Hajiganj Al-Yasin Dakhil Madrasa | 1995 | |
| West Dailjor Dakhil Madrasa | 1995 | |
| Lalmonirhat Model Dakhil Madrasa | 1998 | |
| Madhupur Dakhil Madrasa | 1998 | |
| Great Kamlabari Dakhil Madrasa | 2000 | |
| Jamia Islamia Markazul Quran | 2014 | Founded by Alhaj Abdul Hakim, former teachers include Farid Uddin Masood |

== Notable people ==
- Mojibur Rahman, former MP
- Canteswar Barman, politician

== See also ==
- Upazilas of Bangladesh
- Districts of Bangladesh
- Divisions of Bangladesh
- Thanas of Bangladesh
- Union councils of Bangladesh
- Administrative geography of Bangladesh
