= Karim Uddin Ahmed =

Bangladesh Awami League politician

- করিম উদ্দিন আহমেদ

Member of the East Pakistan Provincial Assembly

Member of Parliament for Rangpur-6
- In office N/A–
- Constituency: Rangpur-6

Jatiya Sangsad
- In office 1973–1979
- Preceded by: Position created
- Succeeded by: Mujibur Rahman

Personal details
- Born: 19 March 1923 Kashiram, Lalmonirhat, Bengal Presidency
- Died: 28 August 1991 (aged 68) Rangpur Medical College Hospital, Bangladesh
- Party: Awami League
- Children: Nuruzzaman Ahmed
- Parents: Azim Uddin Ahmad (father); Nesabi Bewa (mother)

Karim Uddin Ahmed (Bengali: করিম উদ্দিন আহমেদ; 19 March 1923 – 28 August 1991) was a Bangladesh Awami League politician and a Jatiya Sangsad member representing the Rangpur-6 constituency during 1973–1979.

== Early life and education ==
Ahmed was born on 19 March 1923 to a Bengali family in the village of Kashiram in Kaliganj, Lalmonirhat, Rangpur district, Bengal Presidency. He was a son of Moulvi Azim Uddin Ahmad and Nesabi Bewa. He completed his primary education at the pathshala of Nilambar Pandit in Madanpur-Bairati. After that, he studied at the Chilakhal-Paikan madrasa in Gangachara, before proceeding to be educated at the Tushbhandar High School until tenth grade.

== Career ==
Ahmed began his career as an employee of a local Marwari-owned business in 1945. He later established his own jute business. Among his philanthropic contributions is the establishment of various institutions across the Kaliganj thana such as the Kaliganj Karim Uddin Public Pilot High School, Kaliganj Karim Uddin Public Degree College, Karim Uddin Primary School and Karimpur Nesaria Dakhil Madrasa. He also contributed to literary and cultural activities.

Ahmed's entry into politics began with the Quit India Movement, and he was arrested for assisting Mukunda Das. In 1954, he was elected chairman of the Union Board and served in this position for sixteen years. He was elected to the East Pakistan Provincial Assembly as an Awami League candidate for Rangpur-6 constituency but this assembly was not formed and later the Bangladesh Liberation War happened in 1971. During the war, Ahmed presided over the Kaliganj Sangram Council and contributed to the formation of the Kaliganj branch of the Mukti Bahini. His home served as a Mukti Bahini headquarters where the local youth would be provided training. Ahmed hoisted the flag of independent Bangladesh in a public meeting organised at Kaliganj ground. When the Pakistan Army entered Kaliganj, Ahmed fled to Cooch Behar where he established two Mukti Bahini camps, serving as an organiser of the northern Mukti Bahini.

After independence, Ahmed was elected to the first Jatiya Sangsad as a Rangpur-6 Awami League candidate at the 1973 Bangladeshi general election.

== Death ==
Ahmed died in Rangpur Medical College Hospital on 28 August 1991. He is survived by his son, Nuruzzaman Ahmed, who was the former Minister of Social Welfare.
