= Lalmonirhat-1 =

Constituency of Bangladesh's Jatiya Sangsad

Coordinates: 26.12°N 89.14°E

- Constituency for the Jatiya Sangsad
- District: Lalmonirhat District
- Division: Rangpur Division
- Electorate: 403,561 (2026)

Current constituency
- Created: 1984
- Party: Bangladesh Nationalist Party
- Member: Hasan Rajib Prodhan
- ← 15 Nilphamari-4 17 Lalmonirhat-2 →

Lalmonirhat-1 is a constituency represented in the Jatiya Sangsad (National Parliament) of Bangladesh since 2026 by Hasan Rajib Prodhan of the Bangladesh Nationalist Party.

== Boundaries ==
The constituency encompasses Hatibandha and Patgram upazilas.

== History ==
The constituency was created in 1984 from the Rangpur-5 constituency when the former Rangpur District was split into five districts: Nilphamari, Lalmonirhat, Rangpur, Kurigram, and Gaibandha.

== Members of Parliament ==
| Election | Member | Party |
|---|---|---|
| 1986 | Joynal Abedin Sarker | Jatiya Party |
| Feb 1996 | Hasanuzzaman Hasan | Bangladesh Nationalist Party |
| Jun 1996 | Joynal Abedin Sarker | Jatiya Party |
| 2001 | Motahar Hossain | Awami League |
| 2008 | Motahar Hossain | Awami League |
| 2014 | Motahar Hossain | Awami League |
| 2018 | Motahar Hossain | Awami League |
| 2024 | Motahar Hossain | Awami League |
| 2026 | Hasan Rajib Prodhan | Bangladesh Nationalist Party |

== Elections ==
=== Elections in the 2020s ===
General Election 2026: Lalmonirhat-1
| Party | Candidate | Votes | % | ±% |
|---|---|---|---|---|
| BNP | Hasan Rajib Prodhan | 138,686 | 48.7 | N/A |
| Jamaat | Md. Anwarul Islam Raju | 129,572 | 45.5 | N/A |
| Independent | Shihab Ahmed | 7,959 | 2.8 | N/A |
| JP(E) | Mashiur Rahaman Ranga | 5,158 | 1.8 | N/A |
| IAB | Muhammad Fazlul Karim Shahariar | 2,242 | 0.8 | N/A |
| Independent | Rezaul Karim Sarkar | 804 | 0.3 | N/A |
| BJSD | Habib Md. Faruk | 226 | 0.1 | N/A |
| Independent | Abu Shama Md. Redwanul Haque | 191 | 0.1 | N/A |
| Labour | Md. Shubho Ahmed | 143 | 0.1 | N/A |
| Majority | | 9,114 | 3.2 | N/A |
| Turnout | | 284,981 | 70.6 | N/A |
| Registered electors | | 403,561 | | |
| BNP gain from AL | | | | |

=== Elections in the 2010s ===
General Election 2014: Lalmonirhat-1
| Party | Candidate | Votes | % | ±% |
|---|---|---|---|---|
| AL | Motahar Hossain | 179,814 | 93.8 | +29.0 |
| JSD | Sadekul Islam | 6,551 | 3.4 | N/A |
| JP(E) | Hussain Muhammad Ershad | 5,381 | 2.8 | N/A |
| Majority | | 173,263 | 90.4 | +59.4 |
| Turnout | | 191,746 | 69.3 | −21.1 |
| AL hold | | | | |

=== Elections in the 2000s ===
General Election 2008: Lalmonirhat-1
| Party | Candidate | Votes | % | ±% |
|---|---|---|---|---|
| AL | Motahar Hossain | 142,340 | 64.8 | +20.0 |
| Jamaat | Habibur Rahman | 74,219 | 33.8 | +5.7 |
| Zaker Party | Md. Nuruzzaman | 1,531 | 0.7 | N/A |
| BDB | Md. Mokbul Hossain | 1,390 | 0.6 | N/A |
| Independent | Joynal Abedin Sarker | 146 | 0.1 | N/A |
| KSJL | Md. Abdul Hakim Talukdar | 116 | 0.1 | N/A |
| Majority | | 68,121 | 31.0 | +14.2 |
| Turnout | | 219,742 | 90.4 | +13.0 |
| AL hold | | | | |

General Election 2001: Lalmonirhat-1
| Party | Candidate | Votes | % | ±% |
|---|---|---|---|---|
| AL | Motahar Hossain | 78,116 | 44.8 | +6.5 |
| Jamaat | Abu Hena Muhammad Ershad Hossain | 48,907 | 28.1 | −14.0 |
| IJOF | Joynal Abedin Sarker | 44,788 | 25.7 | N/A |
| Jatiya Party (M) | Md. Ali Azam | 2,115 | 1.2 | N/A |
| Bangladesh Samajtantrik Dal (Mahbub) | Md. Shawkat Hossain Ahmmed | 370 | 0.2 | N/A |
| Majority | | 29,209 | 16.8 | +13.0 |
| Turnout | | 174,296 | 77.4 | +1.6 |
| AL gain from JP(E) | | | | |

=== Elections in the 1990s ===
General Election June 1996: Lalmonirhat-1
| Party | Candidate | Votes | % | ±% |
|---|---|---|---|---|
| JP(E) | Joynal Abedin Sarker | 58,478 | 42.1 | +8.6 |
| AL | Motahar Hossain | 53,189 | 38.3 | +7.3 |
| Jamaat | Md. Ynus Ali | 17,710 | 12.8 | −5.2 |
| BNP | Hasanuzzaman Hasan | 8,384 | 6.0 | +3.5 |
| Zaker Party | Md. Nuruzzaman | 812 | 0.6 | −0.2 |
| NDP | Md. Mosleh Uddin Murad | 105 | 0.1 | −0.3 |
| Independent | Md. Sahidullaha Prodhan | 104 | 0.1 | N/A |
| Majority | | 5,289 | 3.8 | +1.3 |
| Turnout | | 138,782 | 75.8 | +15.6 |
| JP(E) hold | | | | |

General Election 1991: Lalmonirhat-1
| Party | Candidate | Votes | % | ±% |
|---|---|---|---|---|
| JP(E) | Joynal Abedin Sarker | 37,203 | 33.5 | |
| AL | Motahar Hossain | 34,384 | 31.0 | |
| Jamaat | Md. Rafiqul Islam | 19,965 | 18.0 | |
| Independent | Abid Ali | 14,876 | 13.4 | |
| BNP | Md. Abdus Sattar | 2,781 | 2.5 | |
| Zaker Party | Md. Nuruzzaman | 893 | 0.8 | |
| NDP | Saifuddin Ahmed | 467 | 0.4 | |
| JSD | Sadekul Islam | 302 | 0.3 | |
| Jatiya Samajtantrik Dal-JSD | Dobir Uddin Ahamed | 195 | 0.2 | |
| Majority | | 2,819 | 2.5 | |
| Turnout | | 111,066 | 60.2 | |
| JP(E) hold | | | | |
