= Rokon Uddin Babul =

Bangladeshi politician

Members of Parliament
- Incumbent
- Assumed office 17 February 2026
- Preceded by: Nuruzzaman Ahmed
- Constituency: Lalmonirhat-2

Personal details
- Party: Bangladesh Nationalist Party
- Occupation: Politician

Rokon Uddin Babul is a Bangladesh Nationalist Party politician and elected member of Parliament from Lalmonirhat-2.
