= Magistrates of the Roman Empire =

The executive magistrates of the Roman Empire were elected individuals of the ancient Roman Empire. During the transition from monarchy to republic, the constitutional balance of power shifted from the executive (the Roman King) to the Roman Senate. During the transition from republic to empire, the constitutional balance of power shifted back to the executive (the Roman Emperor). Theoretically, the senate elected each new emperor, although in practice, it was the army which made the choice. The powers of an emperor, (his imperium) existed, in theory at least, by virtue of his legal standing. The two most significant components to an emperor's imperium were the "tribunician powers" (potestas tribunicia) and the "proconsular powers" (imperium proconsulare). In theory at least, the tribunician powers (which were similar to those of the Plebeian Tribunes under the old republic) gave the emperor authority over Rome's civil government, while the proconsular powers (similar to those of military governors, or Proconsuls, under the old republic) gave him authority over the Roman army. While these distinctions were clearly defined during the early empire, eventually they were lost, and the emperor's powers became less constitutional and more monarchical.

Under the empire, the citizens were divided into three classes, and for members of each class, a distinct career path was available (known as the cursus honorum). The traditional magistracies were only available to citizens of the senatorial class. The magistracies that survived the fall of the republic were (by their order of rank in the cursus honorum) the Consulship, Praetorship, Plebeian Tribunate, Aedileship, Quaestorship, and Military Tribunate. If an individual was not of the senatorial class, he could run for one of these offices if he was allowed to run by the emperor, or otherwise, he could be appointed to one of these offices by the emperor. Mark Antony abolished the offices of Roman Dictator and Magister equitum ("Master of the Horse") during his Consulship in 44 BC, shortly after the assassination of Julius Caesar. The office of Interrex was also abolished during the transition from republic to empire. In 22 BC the emperor Augustus appointed P. Aemilius Lepidus and L. Munatius Plancus to the Censorship, and while they began a census that year, they never completed it, and shortly thereafter the office was abolished. The emperor Claudius attempted to revive the office by appointing himself and L. Vitellius Censor in 47 AD, but after Claudius, no further attempts were made to revive the office.

== Roman Emperor ==
By virtue of his proconsular powers, the emperor held the same grade of military command authority as did the chief magistrates (the Roman Consuls and Proconsuls) under the republic. Since republican Proconsuls had often held their authority for extended periods of time, the prolonged use of this power by the emperor did have precedent. However, the emperor was not subject to the constitutional restrictions that the old Consuls and Proconsuls had been subject to. For example, he was not required to observe collegiality, since he had no colleague, and he could not have his actions vetoed. Eventually, he was given powers that, under the republic, had been reserved for the Roman Senate and the Roman assemblies, including the right to declare war, to ratify treaties, and to negotiate with foreign leaders. The emperor's degree of Proconsular power gave him authority over all of Rome's military governors. Under the republic, Proconsuls (usually former Consuls) were made governors of the more challenging provinces, and as such, most of the Roman army was under the command of one of the Proconsuls. In contrast, the "Propraetors" (usually former Praetors) were made governors of the more stable provinces. Under the republic, Praetors were the second highest ranking magistrates after the Consuls, which was why Propraetors were given provinces that were more stable. Under the early empire, the emperor commanded these Proconsular provinces, while the senate commanded the more stable Propraetorial provinces. It was by this that the emperor held command authority over most of the Roman army.

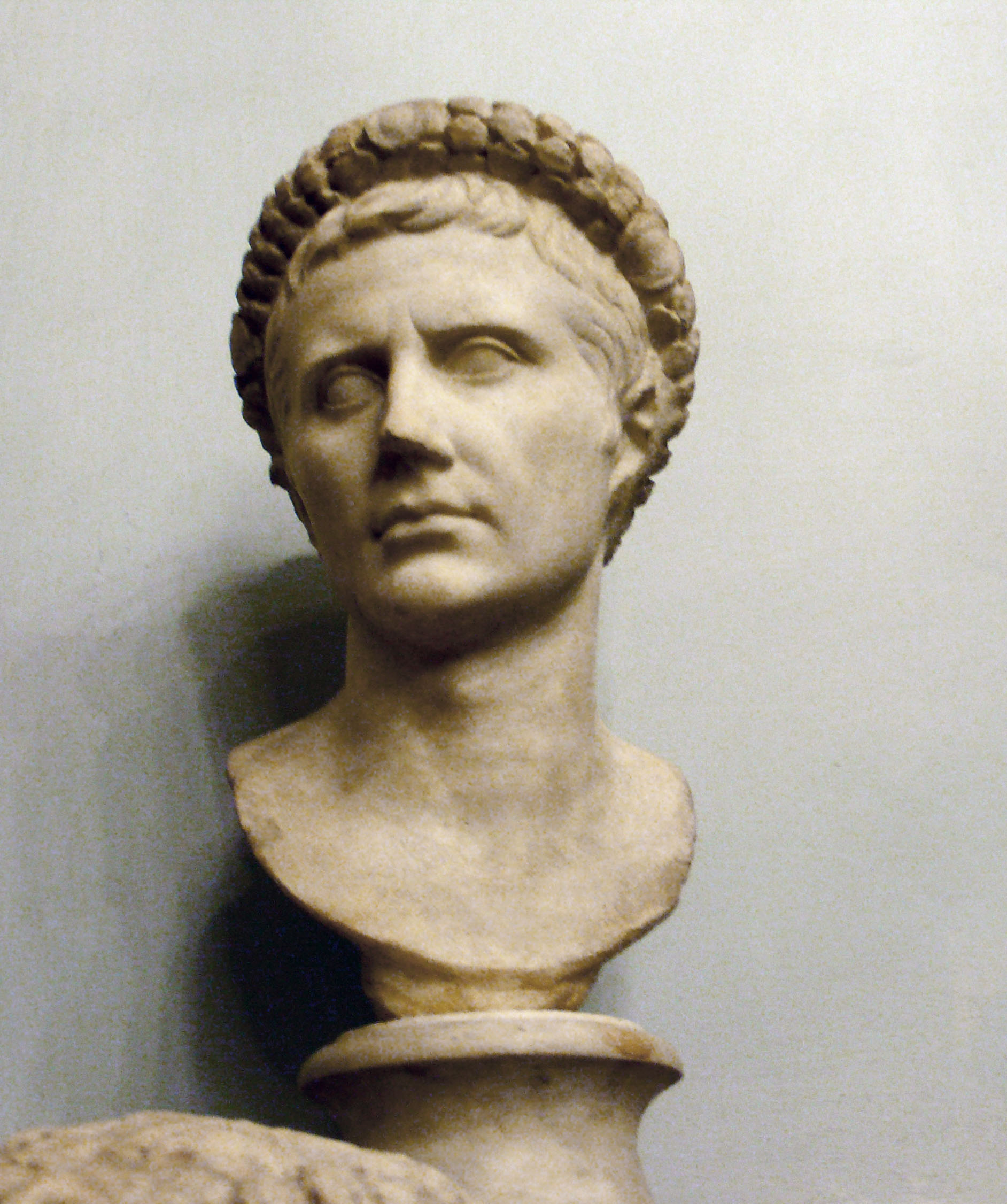
Augustus, the first Roman Emperor.

The emperor's tribunician powers (potestas tribunicia) gave him power over Rome's civil apparatus, although perhaps the most useful facet of the tribunician power was the prestige associated with the office. The Plebeian Tribune had been the magistrate most responsible for the political enfranchisement of the Plebeian (commoner) class during the early republic. The emperor's tribunician powers also gave him the power to preside over, and thus to dominate, the assemblies and the senate. When an emperor was vested with the tribunician powers, his office and his person became sacrosanct. It became a capital offense to harm, to attempt to harm, or to obstruct the emperor, and in time, this power provided the basis for laws that made it a capital offense, publishable by death, to even speak ill of the emperor. His sacrosanctity also gave him the authority to order the use of capital punishment against any individual. Under the republic, Plebeian Tribunes held these same powers, but what made the emperor unique was that he possessed these powers for life, and thus he could never be held accountable for his actions, did not need to stand for reelection every year, and could not have his actions vetoed.

The emperor also had the authority to carry out a range of duties that, under the republic, had been performed by the Roman Censors. Such duties included the authority to farm out tax collection, to grant public contracts, to regulate public morality (Censorship), and to conduct a census. As part of the census, the emperor had the power to grant citizenship to any individual, and to assign individuals to a new social class (the three imperial classes were the senators, the equestrians, and the plebeians), which, therefore, gave the emperor unchallenged control over senate membership. The emperor also had the power to interpret laws and to set precedents, which he did by issuing either an edicta, decreta, or a rescripta. Edicta usually addressed matters associated with the army, treasury, or food supply. The decreta were judicial decisions. The rescripta were issued in response to important questions asked by private citizens. Under the republic, the aerarium Saturni held the state treasury, but only the senate had control over this treasury. While the imperial senate retained control over the aerarium Saturni, this control declined over time. The emperor Augustus established two new treasuries, which future emperors would always control, called the fiscus Caesaris and the aerarium militare. The fiscus Caesaris replaced the aerarium Saturni, and thus became the principal treasury in Rome. The aerarium militare was of minor importance, and its only significant function was to hold funds that were to be used to pay soldiers. In addition, the emperor controlled the religious institutions, since, as emperor, he was always Pontifex Maximus and a member of each of the four major priesthoods.

== Republican executive magistrates under the empire ==
The first step in a political career was election to the Quaestorship, although candidates for the Quaestorship had to be at least twenty-four years old. After they served as Quaestor, they had to wait for at least one year before they could seek election to a higher office, which was usually either the Plebeian Tribunate or the Aedileship. After this, they had to wait for another year before they could seek election to a higher office, which was typically the Praetorship. Members of Patrician (aristocratic) families could seek election to the Praetorship after serving as Quaestor, and they did not have to serve as Plebeian Tribune or Aedile before this. However, since one had to be at least thirty years old before they could run for the Praetorship, Patricians ultimately had no true advantage over Plebeians. After an individual served as Praetor, they had to wait for another two years before they could seek election to the Consulship, and so, while it was not specifically mandated, candidates for the Consulship usually had to be at least thirty-three years old. After a magistrate's term in office expired, they could run again for the same office almost immediately.

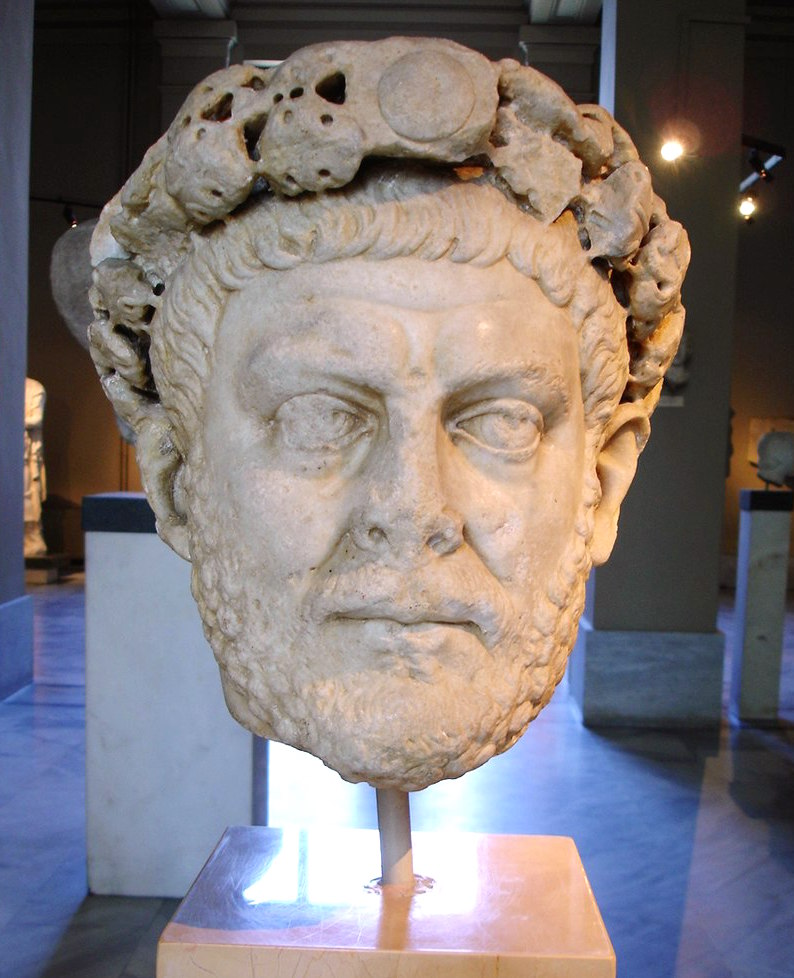
Roman Emperor Diocletian, who ultimately abolished the Principate.

During the transition from republic to empire, no office lost more power or prestige than the Consulship, which was due, in part, to the fact that the substantive powers of republican Consuls were all transferred to the emperor. In addition, the fact that one had to be nominated by the emperor before they could run for any office weakened the independence, and thus the prestige, of the Consulship. In addition, the Consulship lost further prestige from the fact that Consuls usually resigned before their terms ended. Imperial Consuls could preside over the senate, could act as judges in certain criminal trials, and had control over public games and shows. In general, Consular authority did not extend beyond the civil administration of Italy or the senatorial provinces.

Julius Caesar had increased the number of Praetors to sixteen, but Caesar's successor, the emperor Augustus, reduced this number to twelve. The number of Praetors reached its maximum of eighteen under the emperor Claudius. The chief Praetor in Rome, the Urban Praetor (praetor urbanus), outranked all other Praetors, and for a brief time, they were given power over the treasury. Praetors also presided over the "permanent jury courts" (quaestio perpetua). The irrelevancy of the Praetorship became obvious when the emperor Hadrian issued a decree (the edictum perpetuum), which robbed the Praetors of their authority to issue edicts and transferred most of their judicial powers to either the Consuls or to district court judges.

Under the empire, the Plebeian Tribunes remained sacrosanct, and, in theory at least, retained the power to summon, or to veto, the senate and the assemblies. The emperor, who held tribunician powers, dominated the College of Tribunes, and while technically any member of the college could veto any other member, no Tribune dared to oppose the emperor. The Tribune's power over the assemblies meant almost nothing, since the assemblies themselves had no real power, and thus the only real influence that a Tribune had come in the form of the occasional veto over the senate. The Tribunes did also have the power to impose fines, and citizens retained a theoretical right to appeal criminal and civil decisions to a Tribune.

When Augustus became emperor, forty Quaestors were elected each year, but Augustus reduced this number to twenty. Augustus then divided the college of Quaestors into two divisions, and assigned one division the task of serving in the senatorial provinces, and the other the task of managing civil administration in Rome. The Quaestors who were assigned to the provinces (quaestores pro praetore) managed funds given to the province by the senate or the emperor. The two Urban Quaestors (quaestores urbani) had authority over the treasury in Rome (aerarium Saturni), which functioned as a depository for both state funds and official documents. In 56 AD the Quaestors lost their authority over state funds, but retained their authority over official documents. Julius Caesar had increased the number of Aediles to six, and while Augustus retained this number, he also transferred control of the grain supply from the Aediles to a board of commissioners. It wasn't until after they lost the power to maintain order in the city, however, that they truly became powerless, and the office disappeared entirely during the 3rd century.

== See also ==
- Roman Kingdom
- Roman Republic
- Roman Law
- Plebeian Council
- Centuria
- Curia
- Quaestor
- Roman Senate
- Cursus honorum
- Byzantine Senate
- Pontifex Maximus
- Princeps senatus
- Interrex
- Promagistrate
- Acta Senatus
- Executive Magistrate of Bangladesh

== Sources ==
- Polybius (1823). The General History of Polybius: Translated from the Greek. By James Hampton. Oxford: Printed by W. Baxter. Fifth Edition, Vol 2.
- Taylor, Lily Ross (1966). Roman Voting Assemblies: From the Hannibalic War to the Dictatorship of Caesar. The University of Michigan Press (ISBN 0-472-08125-X).
