= Sheikh Fazlul Karim =

Indian poet and writer

- Born: 1882; Kakina Bazar, Lalmonirhat, Rangpur district, Bengal Presidency
- Died: 1936 (aged 53–54)
- Occupation: Poet

Sheikh Fazlul Karim (1882–1936; Bengali: শেখ ফজলুল করিম), also known by his daak naam Mona (Bengali: মোনা), was a Bengali poet and writer. He was born in Lalmonirhat.

== Early life and education ==
Fazlul Karim was born on 30 Choitro 1289 BS (1882) to the Bengali Muslim of Sardars in the village of Kakina Bazar which was then located in Lalmonirhat, Rangpur district, Bengal Presidency. He was the second of the five sons and three daughters of Amirullah Sardar and Kokila Bibi.

Fazlul Karim was interested in poetry from a young age, and it has been said that there were times when he would escape to go to school whilst only three to four years of age. When he turned five, he joined the Kakina School. At the age of eleven, he published his first handwritten book of poetry, Shorol Poddo Bikash. He then went on to enroll at the Rangpur Zilla School for class six but returned to Kakina School instead where he completed his minor. He was then sent to Rangpur again, but returned home once again.

== Personal life ==
Fazlul Karim married Basirunnesa Khatun when he was 13 years old.

== Career ==
Karim wrote his first book at the age of eleven, entitled Sarol Paddo Bikash. From this point on, the remainder of his life was devoted to literature. He was famous for both his prose and poetry. He edited the monthly BASANA.

Karim's writing is marked by a profound simplicity. He worked for Hindu-Muslim friendship. His literary works have been included in school curriculum, in both secondary and higher secondary Bengali literature in Bangladesh.

== Works ==
- Sarol Paddo Bikash
- Poritran Kabbo
- Chintar Chash
- Path o Patheyo
- Gatha
- Voktipushpanjoli
