= Kaliganj Upazila, Lalmonirhat =

Kaliganj কালীগঞ্জ
- Upazila
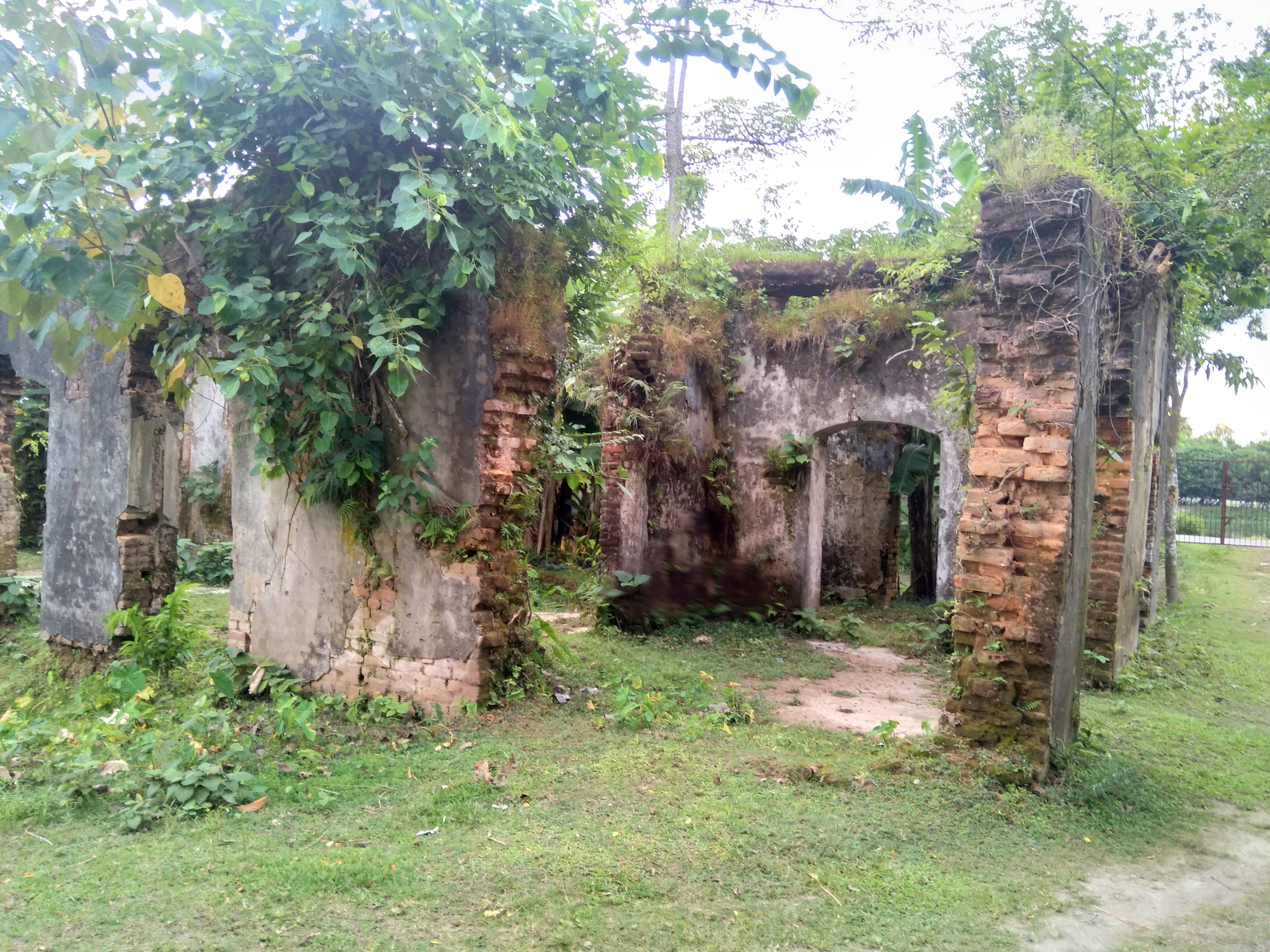
- Kakina Zamindar Bari

- Coordinates: 25.9679°N 89.2083°E
- Country: Bangladesh
- Division: Rangpur
- District: Lalmonirhat

Area
  - Total: 253.24 km^{2} (97.78 sq mi)

Population (2022)
  - Total: 277,024
  - Density: 1,093.9/km^{2} (2,833.2/sq mi)
- Time zone: UTC+6 (BST)
- Postal code: 5520
- Website: kaliganj.lalmonirhat.gov.bd

Kaliganj (Bengali: কালীগঞ্জ) is an upazila of the Lalmonirhat District in Rangpur Division, Bangladesh.

== History ==
This area was formerly a chakla governed by Indra Narayan Chakravarti during the reign of Maharaja Madan (Moda) Narayan (1665–1680) of Koch Bihar. Ibadat Khan, the Mughal faujdar of Ghoraghat, led an expedition against Koch Bihar in 1687. The Mughals were supported by Raghavendra Narayan and Ram Narayan, who were the two sons of Chakravarti's personal officer Raghuram. Following the Mughal victory, Chakravarti was deposed and the Mughals honored Raghavendra Narayan as the Chaudhury Zamindar of Bashatti and Ram Narayan as the Chaudhury Zamindar of Kakina. The zamindars of Kakina, descended from Ram Narayan, continued to hold influence in the region.

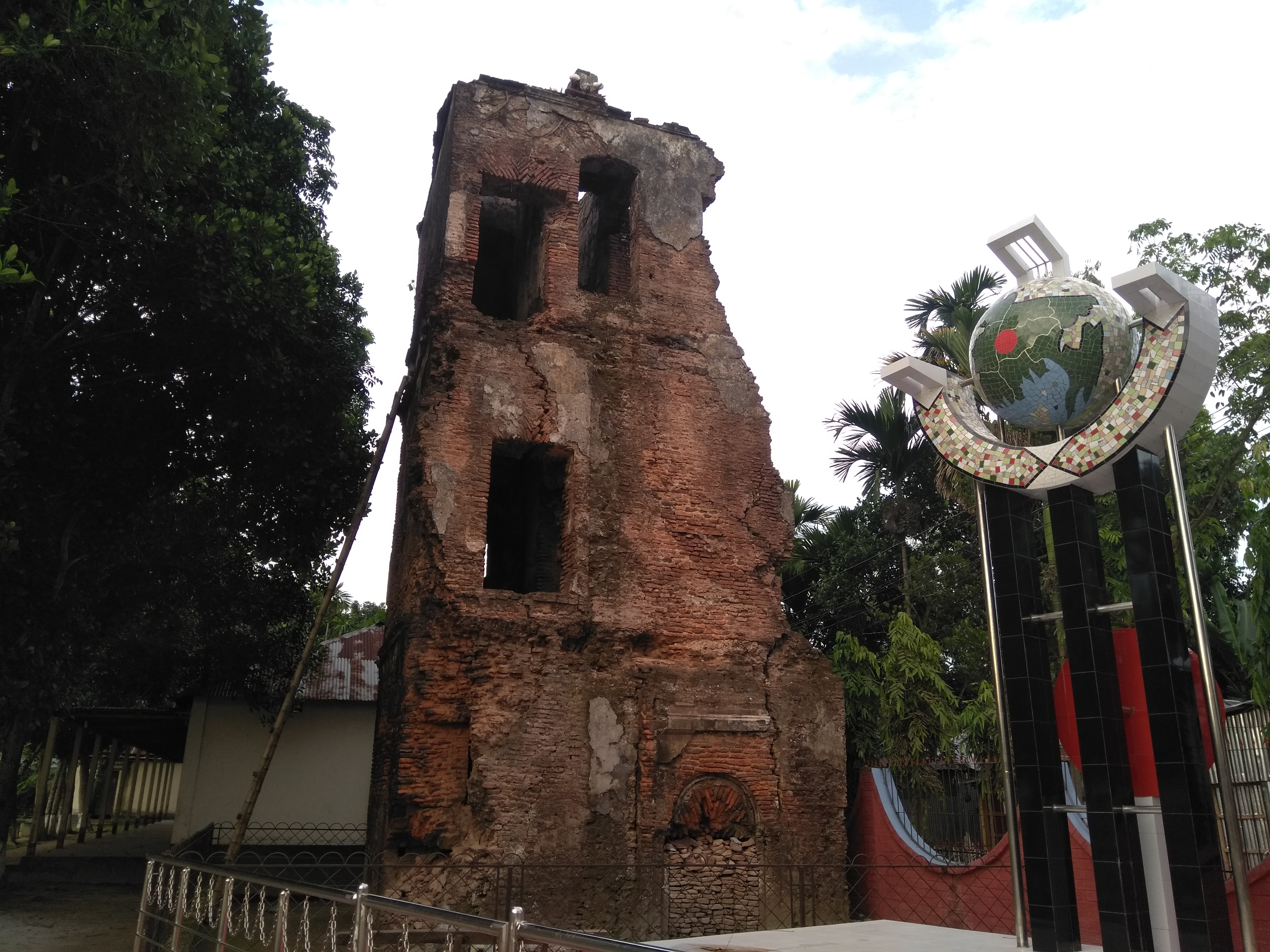
Ruins of the Kakina zamindar palace

The area was affected by the peasant rebellion of Nuraldin in 1783 and the Fakir-Sannyasi Rebellion. In 1793, 21 thanas (police outpost headquarters) were assigned to the Rangpur district in accordance to Regulation No. 12. One thana was established in the village of Phurunbari in Goral mouza and encompassed parts of the present-day subdistricts of Kaliganj, Hatibandha and Aditmari. In 1304 BS (c. 1897 AD), the Bengal Dooars Railway was established and the thana was relocated from Phurunbari to Kaliganj in need of good communication. Kaliganj takes its name from Raja Kaliprasad Raichaudhury of the Ghosal clan, who was the erstwhile zamindar of Tushbhandar. Mahendra Ranjan Chaudhury, the Zamindar of Kakina, fell into debt from moneylenders and government revenue and his zamindari was auctioned in 1925. Chaudhury fled with his family to Darjeeling in 1949, where he died, and his remaining descendants converted to Islam. His final descendant, Hamida Khatun, married a man from Sheikhpara in Gangachara. Her son and successor Musaddiq Ali Azad is the current chairman of Morneya Union council.

During the Bangladesh War of Independence in 1971, Kaliganj thana was under Sector No. 6 led by Khademul Bashar. Several civilians were executed by the Pakistan Army on 6 April. The army left Hatibandha and took shelter in Kaliganj on 30 November. The area was captured by Bengali fighters on 6 December.

On 9 April 1981, eight unions of Kaliganj thana separated to form the Aditmari thana. On 15 December 1983, Kaliganj thana was made an upazila (sub-district) as part of the President of Bangladesh Hussain Muhammad Ershad's decentralisation programme. Muhammad Ansar Ali was appointed as the first Upazila Nirbahi Officer of Kaliganj.

== Geography ==
Kaliganj is located at 25.1333°N 89.2167°E. It has 58,138 households and total area of 253.24 km^{2}.

== Demographics ==
Religions in Kaliganj Upazila (2022)
Religion	Percent
Islam	82.15%
Hinduism	17.80%
Other or not stated	0.05%

According to the 2022 Bangladeshi census, Kaliganj Upazila had 68,037 households and a population of 277,024. 9.60% of the population were under 5 years of age. Kaliganj had a literacy rate (age 7 and over) of 72.55%: 75.96% for males and 69.16% for females, and a sex ratio of 99.89 males for every 100 females. 49,491 (17.87%) lived in urban areas.

According to the 2011 Census of Bangladesh, Kaliganj Upazila had 58,138 households and a population of 245,595. 58,241 (23.71%) were under 10 years of age. Kaliganj had a literacy rate (age 7 and over) of 46.00%, compared to the national average of 51.8%, and a sex ratio of 1009 females per 1000 males. 18,967 (7.72%) lived in urban areas.

As of the 1991 Bangladesh census, Kaliganj has a population of 187,494. Males constitute 51.48% of the population, and females 48.52%. This Upazila's eighteen up population is 89,669. Kaliganj has an average literacy rate of 24% (7+ years), and a national average of 32.4% are literate.

== Administration ==
Kaliganj Upazila is divided into eight union parishads: Bhotemari, Chalbala, Chandrapur, Dalagram, Goral, Kakina, Madati, and Tushbhandar. The union parishads are subdivided into 64 mauzas and 92 villages.

=== Upazila chairmen ===
List of chairmen
Name	Term
Karim Uddin Ahmed	5 June 1985 – 30 May 1990
Nuruzzaman Ahmed	1 June 1990 – 23 November 1991
Nuruzzaman Ahmed	23 February 2009 – 1 December 2013
Mahbubuzzaman Ahmed	28 April 2014 – 7 February 2019
Mahbubuzzaman Ahmed	8 April 2009 – present

== Facilities ==
Kaliganj is home to 74 madrasas and the famous Ijaradar Mosque. Among them, there are 19 Alia madrasahs:

1. Kakinahat Mostafabia Kamil Madrasa
2. Kashiram Ekramia Alim Madrasa
3. Munirabad Sufia Alim Madrasa
4. Chalbala-Dalgram Fazil Madrasa
5. Latabar Ekramia Rahmania Alia Madrasa
6. Bhullyarhat Ashrafia Dakhil Madrasa
7. Shialkhoa Karimia Dakhil Madrasa
8. Dalgram Dakhil Madrasa
9. Goral Dakhil Madrasa
10. Karimpur Nesabia Dakhil Madrasa
11. Tetulia Islamia Dakhil Madrasa
12. Shakhati Jabbaria Dakhil Madrasa
13. Naodabas Dakhil Madrasa
14. North Dalgram B. A. Dakhil Madrasa
15. West Rudeshwar Dakhil Madrasa
16. Achintala Dakhil Madrasa
17. Harishwar Dakhil Madrasa
18. Bairati Dakhil Madrasa
19. Darus Salam Girls Dakhil Madrasa

== Notable people ==
- Sheikh Fazlul Karim (1882–1936), poet and author
- Sheikh Reyazuddin Ahmed (1882–1972), author and social worker
- Karim Uddin Mohammad (1923–1981), politician
- Nuruzzaman Ahmed (born 1950), government minister

== See also ==
- Upazilas of Bangladesh
- Districts of Bangladesh
- Divisions of Bangladesh
- Thanas of Bangladesh
- Union councils of Bangladesh
- Administrative geography of Bangladesh
- Villages of Bangladesh
