= Executive magistrate (Bangladesh) =

Executive Magistrate
- Emblem of Bangladesh Administrative Service

Occupation
- Names: Government of Bangladesh
- Occupation type: Bangladesh Civil Service (Administration)
- Activity sectors: Law and Administration

Description
- Competencies: Administrative proficiency, professional competency, Integrity, Impertiality, Leadership, Analytical mind, Critical thinking, Creativity, Vision and Empathy
- Education required: Minimum four year long bachelor degree in any discipline
- Fields of employment: Executive court and magisterial duties
- Related jobs: Magistracy

The Executive Magistrates (Bengali: নির্বাহী ম্যাজিস্ট্রেট) are the magistrates of the executive organ of the People's Republic of Bangladesh. The members of the Bangladesh Civil Service (Administration) also known as Bangladesh Administrative Service are appointed as the Executive Magistrates. These officials wield extensive executive and limited judicial powers within their respective jurisdiction. During periods of national emergency, they assume leadership roles at the forefront of governance. Their primary duties encompass maintaining law and order, protecting citizen's right, monitoring markets, overseeing elections and public examinations, conducting evictions, upholding protocol and safeguarding the government’s interests through necessary means. The courts they preside over are referred to as executive courts and operate in accordance with the provisions outlined in the Code of Criminal Procedure, 1898 and the Mobile Court Act, 2009.

The role of the executive magistrates remains highly controversial, as Bangladesh has formally separated the judiciary from the executive in 2009, in accordance with its Constitution.

== History ==
Prior to 1 November 2007, the court of Magistrates was staffed by officers from Bangladesh Civil Service (Administration). Through an Ordinance in 2007, the Code of Criminal Procedure, 1898 was amended and two classes of Magistrates were created, namely, Judicial Magistrates and Executive Magistrates. The Ordinance was later substituted by the Code of Criminal Procedure (Amendment) Act, 2009 (with effect from 1 November 2007). While Judicial Magistrates are appointed from the persons employed in Bangladesh Judicial Service, Executive Magistrates are appointed from the members of Bangladesh Civil Service (Administration).

== Controversy ==
The High Court Division of the Supreme Court on 13 May 2017 issued a verdict that declared the mobile courts by the executive magistrate illegal and unconstitutional. Subsequently, the judgment of the High Court Division was challenged by the government. On 16 January 2018, Supreme Court's Appellate Division granted leave to appeal and stayed the said verdict till disposal of the case.

== Types of Executive Magistrate ==
According to Section 10 (5) of the Code of Criminal Procedure, 1898, the Government may, if it thinks expedient or necessary, appoint any persons employed in the Bangladesh Civil Service (Administration) to be an Executive Magistrate and confer the powers of an Executive Magistrate on any such member. Besides, it is also mentioned in Section 10(6) of the said Code that all persons appointed as Assistant Commissioners, Additional Deputy Commissioners or Upazila Nirbahi Officer in any District or Upazila shall be Executive Magistrates and may exercise the power of Executive Magistrate within their existing respective local areas.

In every administrative district, there are following Executive Magistrates as per Section 10 of the Code of Criminal Procedure, 1898:

1. District Magistrate (DM): In every district and in every Metropolitan Area, the Government shall appoint as many persons as it thinks fit to be Executive Magistrates and shall appoint one of them to be the District Magistrate.
2. Additional District Magistrate (ADM): The Government may also appoint any Executive Magistrate to be an Additional District Magistrate, and such Additional District Magistrate shall have all or any of the powers of a District Magistrate under this Code or under any other law for the time being in force, as the Government may direct.
3. Additional Deputy Commissioner (ADC): All the ADCs in the district are Executive Magistrate.
4. Upazila Nirbahi Officer: (Sub-District/Upazila Executive Officer)
5. Assistant Commissioner: including Senior Assistant Commissioner and Assistant Commissioner (Land)

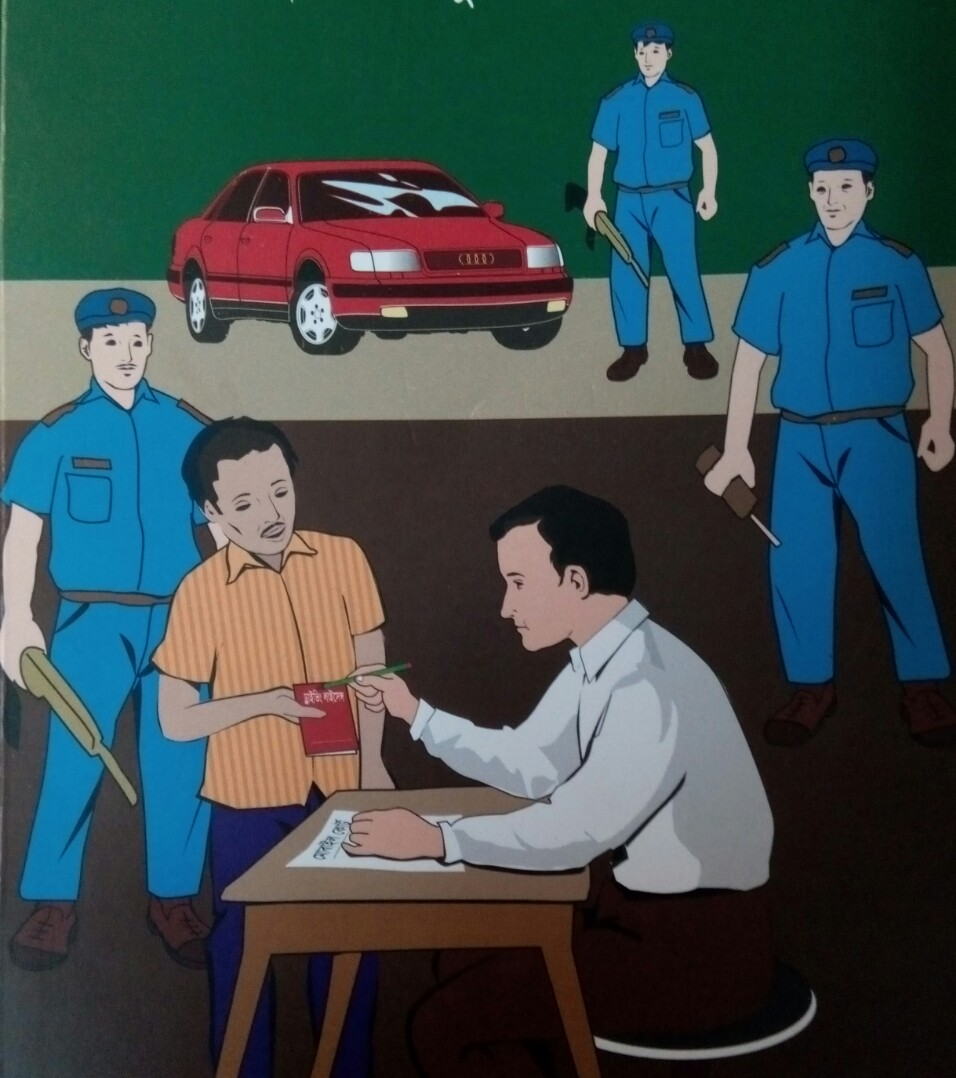
Executive Magistrate of Bangladesh conducting mobile court

== Powers of an Executive Magistrate ==
According to Schedule III of the Code of Criminal Procedure, 1898, an Executive Magistrate has the following powers:

V. Ordinary Powers of an Executive Magistrate.

(1) Power to arrest, or to direct the arrest of and to commit to custody, a person committing an offence in presence of the Magistrate, section 64.

(2) Power to arrest, or direct the arrest in his presence of a person for whose arrest he can issue warrant, section 65.

(3) Power to endorse a warrant or to order the removal of an accused person arrested under a warrant section 83, 84, 86.

(4) Power to cause search by postal and telegraph authority for documents etc. and to detain them. Section 95 (2).

(5) Power to issue search-warrant for discovery of persons wrongfully confined, Section 100.

(6) Power to direct search, in his presence of any place for the search of which he can issue search-warrant. Section 105.

(7) Power to require security to keep peace. Section 107. 404 Criminal Procedure [1898: Act V

(8) Power to require security for good behaviour form vagrants and suspected persons. Section 109.

(9) Power to require security for good behaviour. Section 110.

(10) Power to discharge sureties. Section 126.

(11) Power to command unlawful assembly to disperse. Section 127.

(12) Power to use civil force to disperse unlawful assembly; Section 128.

(13) Power to require military force to be used to disperse unlawful assembly, Section 130.

(14) Power to make orders as to local nuisance, section 133.

(15) Power to issue injunction as immediate measure, in case of public nuisance, section 142.

An Executive Magistrate may be invested with the following powers by the Government and the District Magistrate:

VI. An Executive Magistrate by the Government-

(a) Power to issue search-warrant otherwise than in course of inquiry, section 98;

(b) Power to require security for good behaviour in case of seditions, section 108;

(c) Power to make orders prohibiting repetition of nuisance, section 143;

(d) Power to make orders under section 144, 145 and 147;

(e) Power to held inquests, section 174.

VII. An Executive Magistrate by the District Magistrate -

(a) Power to make orders prohibiting repetition of nuisance, section 143;

(b) Power to hold inquests, section 174.]

In addition to the powers mentioned above, any Executive Magistrate may be empowered by the Government as well as by the District Magistrate within respective jurisdiction to operate mobile court under the Mobile Court Act, 2009. This Act has a Schedule which contains a list of laws upon which mobile courts are administered. Under this Act, the Executive Magistrate may take into cognizance the offences committed in his/her presence or unfolded before him or her on the spot of the occurrence. Upon confession of the accused, the said Magistrate can sentence the offender as per the concerned law, but in case of imprisonment, not exceeding two years.

== Scope ==
- Executive Magistrate, District administration of Bangladesh
- Executive Magistrate, Metropolitan Area in Bangladesh
- Executive Magistrate, Airports of Bangladesh
- Executive Magistrate, Chittagong Port
- Executive Magistrate, Dhaka North & South City Corporation
- Executive Magistrate, Chittagong City Corporation
- Executive Magistrate, Water Supply and Sewerage Authority (WASA)
- Executive Magistrate, Bangladesh Standards and Testing Institution (BSTI)
- Executive Magistrate, Department of Environment
- Executive Magistrate, Dhaka Metropolitan Police
- Executive Magistrate, Chittagong Metropolitan Police
- Executive Magistrate, Rajshahi Metropolitan Police
- Executive Magistrate, Bangladesh Road and Transport Authority (BRTA)
- Executive Magistrate, Rapid Action Battalion (RAB)

== See also ==
- Executive Magistrates of the Roman Empire
- Magistrate
- District Administration, Rangamati
- Upazila Nirbahi Officer
- Union councils of Bangladesh
