= Joynal Abedin Sarker =

Bangladeshi politician

Member of Bangladesh Parliament
- In office 7 February 1966 – 7 February
- Preceded by: Seats start
- Succeeded by: Hasanuzzaman Hasan
- In office 07 february1966 – 7 February 1966
- Preceded by: Hasanuzzaman Hasan
- Succeeded by: Motahar Hossain

Personal details
- Died: 13 December 2017
- Party: Jatiya Party (Ershad)

Joynal Abedin Sarker (died 13 December 2017) was a Jatiya Party (Ershad) politician and a former member of parliament for Lalmonirhat-1.

== Career ==
Sarker was elected to parliament from Lalmonirhat-1 as a Jatiya Party candidate in 1986, 1988 and June 1996.
