= Lalmonirhat =

City in Lalmonirhat District, Rangpur Division

Lalmonirhat লালমনিরহাট
- Town and Municipality
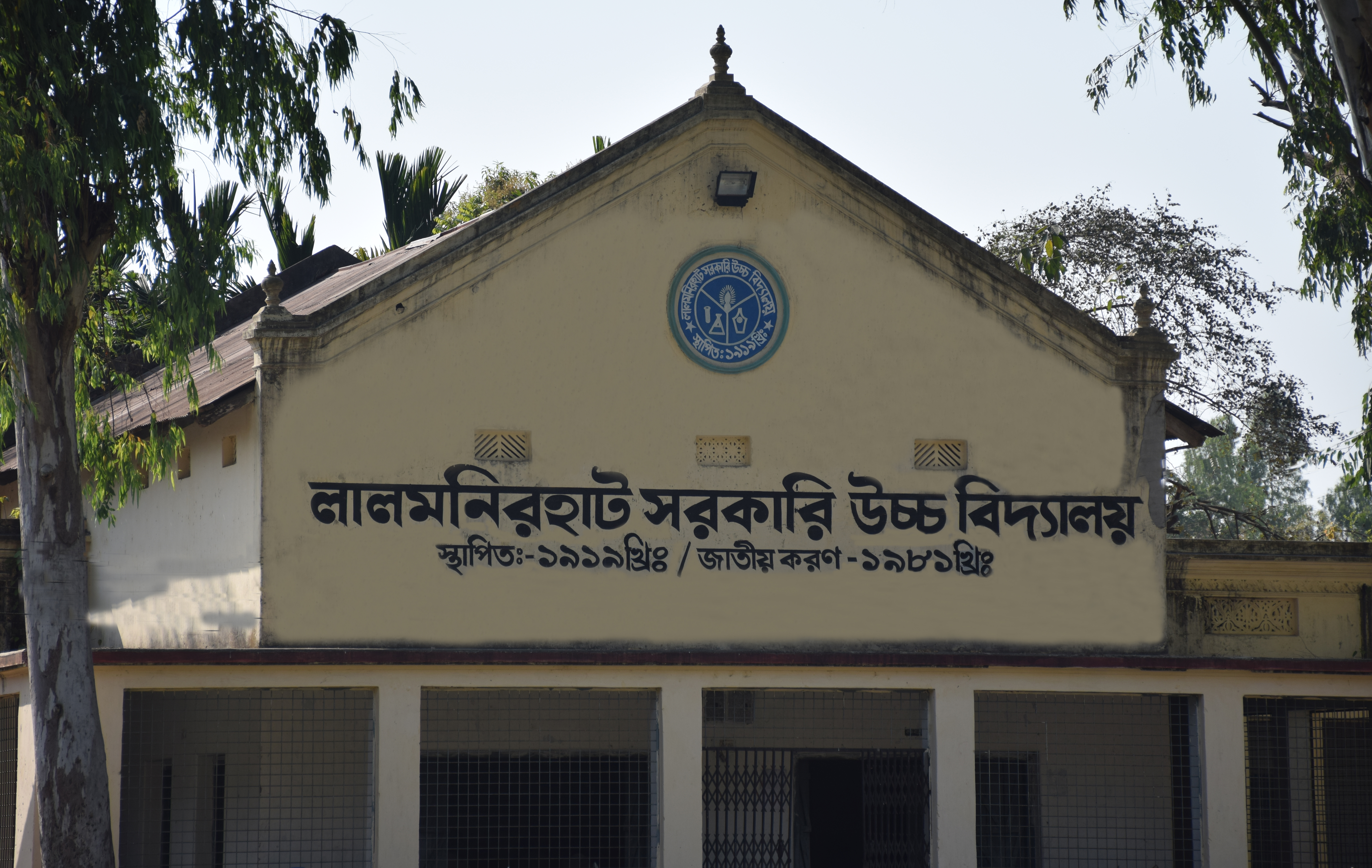
- Lalmonirhat Govt High School

- Location in Rangpur division Location in Bangladesh
- Coordinates: 25°55′N 89°27′E
- Country: Bangladesh
- Division: Rangpur Division
- District: Lalmonirhat District
- Upazila: Lalmonirhat Sadar
- Established: January 20, 1972

Government
  - Type: Mayor–Council
  - Body: Lalmonirhat Municipality
  - Paura Mayor: Ex. Md Rezaul Karim Swapan

Area
  - Total: 17.6 km^{2} (6.8 sq mi)

Population (2011)
  - Total: 60,322
  - Density: 3,430/km^{2} (8,880/sq mi)
- Time zone: UTC+6 (Bangladesh Time)
- National Dialing Code: +880

Lalmonirhat Municipality mahallah geocode map

Lalmonirhat (Bengali: লালমনিরহাট) is a town and district headquarters of Lalmonirhat District in the division of Rangpur, Bangladesh.

== Demographics ==
Religions in Lalmonirhat (2022)
Religion	Percent
Islam	86.47%
Hinduism	13.15%
Other or not stated	0.36%

According to the 2022 Bangladesh census, Lalmonirhat city had 16,242 households and a population of 67,135. 8.59% of the population is under 5 years of age. Lalmonirhat had a sex ratio of 97.35 males per 100 females and a literacy rate of 80.59%.

According to the 2011 Bangladesh census, Lalmonirhat city had 13,897 households and a population of 60,322. 11,792 (19.55%) were under 10 years of age. Lalmonirhat had a literacy rate (age 7 and over) of 65.98%, compared to the national average of 51.8%, and a sex ratio of 978 females per 1000 males.
