= Lalmonirhat Sadar Upazila =

Lalmonirhat Sadar লালমনিরহাট সদর
- Upazila
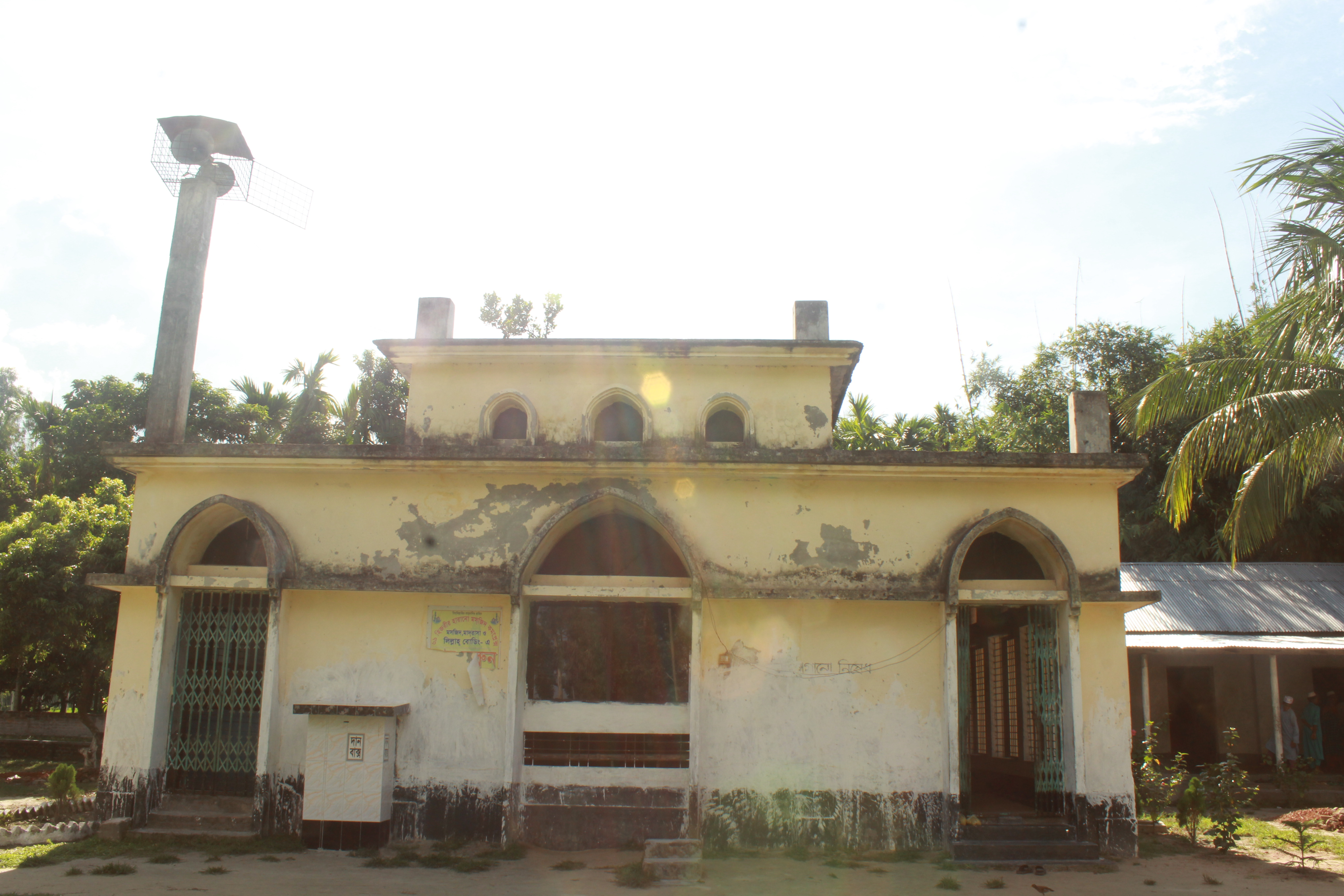
- Majader Ara, possibly the oldest mosque in South Asia

- Coordinates: 25°54.9′N 89°27′E
- Country: Bangladesh
- Division: Rangpur
- District: Lalmonirhat
- Headquarters: Lalmonirhat

Area
  - Total: 263.83 km^{2} (101.87 sq mi)

Population (2022)
  - Total: 373,470
  - Density: 1,415.6/km^{2} (3,666.3/sq mi)
- Time zone: UTC+6 (BST)
- Postal code: 5500
- Area code: 0591
- Website: Official Map of Lalmonirhat Sadar

Lalmonirhat Sadar Upazila mauza geocode map

Lalmonirhat Sadar (Bengali: লালমনিরহাট সদর) is an upazila of Lalmonirhat District in the Division of Rangpur, Bangladesh. Its headquarters are in Lalmonirhat.

== Geography ==
Lalmonirhat Sadar is located at 25.9153°N 89.4500°E. It has a total area of 263.83 km^{2}. Teesta River flows inside this upazila.

== Demographics ==
Historical population
Year	Pop. (000)	±%
1981	212	—
1991	261	+23.1%
2001	289	+10.7%
2011	333	+15.2%
2022	373	+12.0%
Source: Bangladesh Bureau of Statistics

Religions in Lalmonirhat Sadar Upazila (2022)
Religion	Percent
Islam	85.53%
Hinduism	14.35%
Other or not stated	0.12%

According to the 2022 Bangladeshi census, Lalmonirhat Sadar Upazila had 91,859 households and a population of 373,470. 9.12% of the population were under 5 years of age. Lalmonirhat Sadar had a literacy rate (age 7 and over) of 69.11%: 72.82% for males and 65.46% for females, and a sex ratio of 99.11 males for every 100 females. 91,371 (24.47%) lived in urban areas.

According to the 2011 Census of Bangladesh, Lalmonirhat Sadar Upazila had 79,147 households and a population of 333,166. 78,228 (23.48%) were under 10 years of age. Lalmonirhat Sadar had a literacy rate (age 7 and over) of 47.37%, compared to the national average of 51.8%, and a sex ratio of 998 females per 1000 males. 60,322 (18.11%) lived in urban areas.

As of the 1991 Bangladesh census, Lalmonirhat Sadar has a population of 260876. Males constitute are 51.52% of the population, and females 48.48%. This Upazila's eighteen up population is 131281. Lalmonirhat Sadar has an average literacy rate of 27.7% (7+ years), and the national average of 32.4% literate.

== Administration ==
Lalmonirhat Sadar Upazila is divided into Lalmonirhat Municipality and nine union parishads: Barobari, Gokunda, Harati, Khuniagachh, Kulaghat, Mogolhat, Mohendranagar, Panchagram, and Rajpur. The union parishads are subdivided into 117 mauzas and 173 villages.

Lalmonirhat Municipality is subdivided into 9 wards and 64 mahallas.

== Education ==
There are 19 colleges in the upazila. They include honors level Lalmonirhat Government College.

== See also ==
- Lalmonirhat Junction
- Upazilas of Bangladesh
- Districts of Bangladesh
- Divisions of Bangladesh
