= Hatibandha Upazila =

Hatibandha হাতিবান্ধা
- Upazila
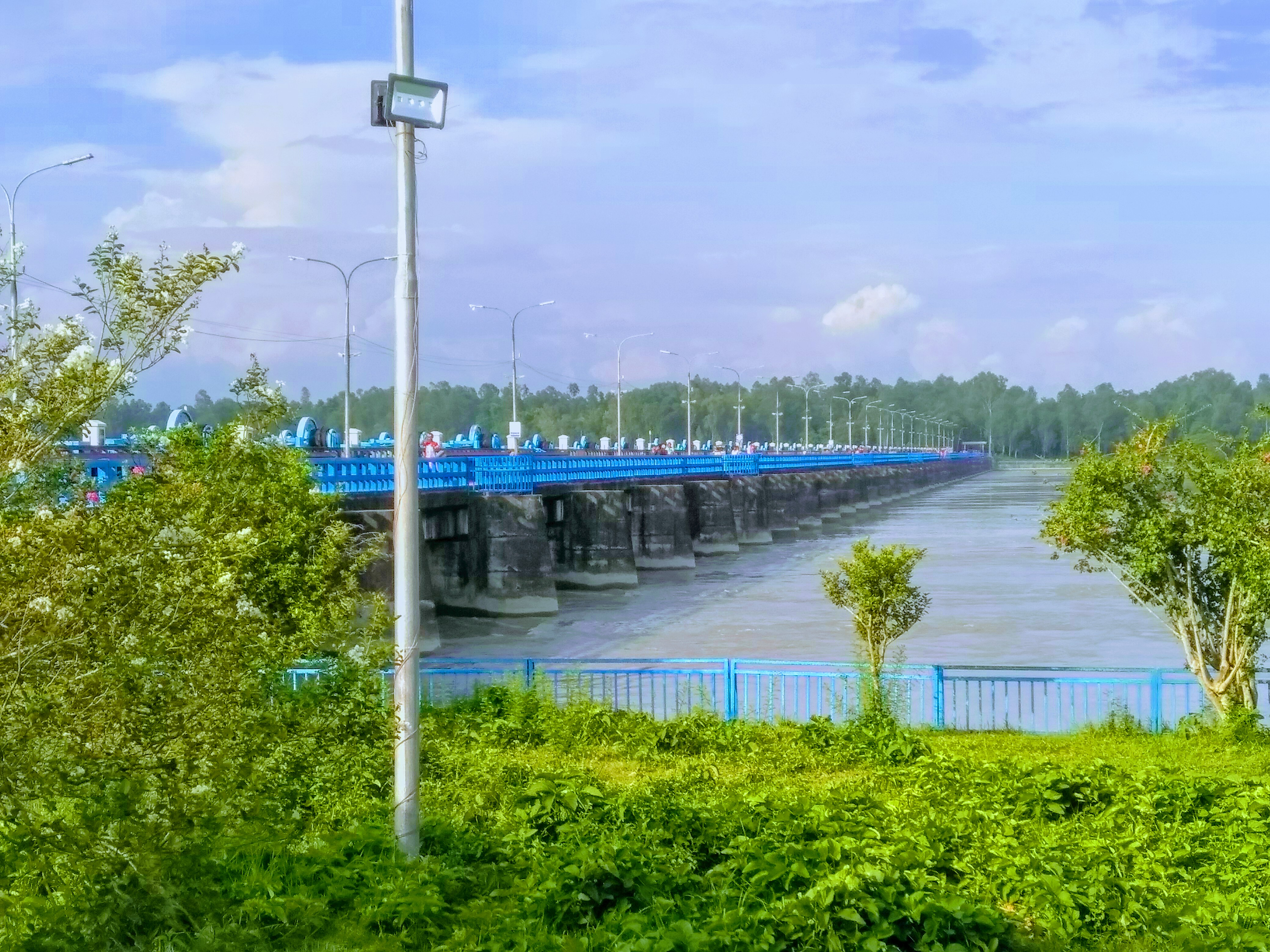
- Teesta Bararge, Hatibandha

- Coordinates: 26°6.8′N 89°8′E
- Bangladesh: Bangladesh
- Division: Rangpur
- District: Lalmonirhat

Area
  - Total: 288.42 km^{2} (111.36 sq mi)

Population (2022)
  - Total: 264,107
- Time zone: UTC+6 (BST)
- Postal code: 5530
- Website: Official Map of Hatibandha

Hatibandha Upazila mauza geocode map

Hatibandha (Bengali: হাতিবান্ধা) is an upazila of Lalmonirhat District in Rangpur Division, Bangladesh.

== Geography ==
Hatibandha is located at 26.1125°N 89.1333°E. It has 53,122 households and total area 288.42 km^{2}.

== Demographics ==
Religions in Hatibandha Upazila (2022)
Religion	Percent
Islam	88.31%
Hinduism	11.69%
Other or not stated	0.00%

According to the 2022 Bangladeshi census, Hatibandha Upazila had 63,419 households and a population of 264,107. 9.72% of the population were under 5 years of age. Hatibandha had a literacy rate (age 7 and over) of 71.92%: 74.98% for males and 68.86% for females, and a sex ratio of 100.56 males for every 100 females. 29,950 (11.34%) lived in urban areas.

According to the 2011 Census of Bangladesh, Hatibandha Upazila had 53,122 households and a population of 233,927. 59,558 (25.46%) were under 10 years of age. Hatibandha had a literacy rate (age 7 and over) of 45.30%, compared to the national average of 51.8%, and a sex ratio of 1002 females per 1000 males. 9,476 (4.05%) lived in urban areas.

As of the 1991 Bangladesh census, Hatibandha has a population of 172,417. Males constitute 51.39% of the population, and females 48.61%. This upazila's eighteen up population is 85,064. Hatibandha has an average literacy rate of 21.4% (7+ years), and the national average of 32.4% literate.

== Administration ==
Hatibandha Upazila is divided into 12 union parishads: Barokhata, Dawabari, Fakirpara, Goddimari, Gotamari, Nowdabas, Paticapara, Shaniajan, Sindurna, Singimari, Tongvhanga, and Vhelaguri. The union parishads are subdivided into 63 mauzas and 65 villages.

== See also ==
- Upazilas of Bangladesh
- Districts of Bangladesh
- Divisions of Bangladesh
- Thanas of Bangladesh
- Union councils of Bangladesh
- Administrative geography of Bangladesh
- Villages of Bangladesh
- List of villages in Bangladesh
- Executive Magistrate of Bangladesh
- Executive magistrate (Bangladesh)
