= District Administration, Rangamati =

District administration is the apex office of a district within the current administrative framework of Bangladesh. It manages affairs within a district, which is the basic territorial unit of administration in the country. At this level, the general public has direct contact with the administration. The district is overseen by a district officer, known as the Deputy Commissioner, District Collector, or District Magistrate, who acts as the representative of the central government at this level. Like other district administrations in the country, the District Administration of Rangamati, commonly referred to as the Office of the Deputy Commissioner, serves as the representative of the cabinet in the Rangamati Hill District.

== Evolution of Rangamati District Administration ==
Bangladesh's entire public administration structure reflects its colonial past. Present-day Bangladesh was part of the British Empire for almost two hundred years and became known as East Pakistan under Pakistani rule in 1947. The Bangladesh Liberation War in 1971 led to Bangladesh's independence.

=== British era ===
Before 1860, the Chittagong Hill Tracts was a part of Chittagong District and was administered by the Deputy Commissioner of Chittagong. In 1860, the Chittagong Hill Tracts was separated from Chittagong District and established as a distinct district. This change followed an attack in 1859 by tribal people from the east on a fort near the Kaptai Canal. In response, the Divisional Commissioner of Chittagong decided to enhance security for the tribal people and proposed to the Governor of Bengal that the region be separated from the Chittagong District. The proposal was accepted and enacted on 1 August 1860 by Act XXII of that year. An officer titled Superintendent was appointed, and Captain McGrath became the first Superintendent of the district, responsible for implementing British rule under the provisions of the Divisional Commissioner of Chittagong.

In 1867, the designation of the ruler changed from Superintendent to Deputy Commissioner. The first administrative headquarters of the district was established at Chandraghona in 1863, but it was transferred to Rangamati in 1868, with the move becoming effective the following year. Captain T. H. Lewin was the first Deputy Commissioner to move to Rangamati permanently.

However, in 1891, the Chittagong Hill Tracts lost its status as a district due to the British conquest of the Lushai Hills, which diminished its importance. It was then made a sub-division of the Chittagong District, with an Assistant Commissioner given authority over it. In 1900, the Chittagong Hill Tracts Regulation 1900 was enacted to administer the area, reinstating its status as a district. The officer in charge of the district was once again titled Superintendent. At this time, the district was divided into three sub-divisions: Rangamati, Bandarban, and Ramgarh, each with its own Sub-Divisional Officer.

In 1979, three more sub-divisions were created through separate gazettes. In 1920, the Chittagong Hill Tracts Regulation 1900 was amended, renaming the ruler of the district as the Deputy Commissioner. An Indian Civil Service officer was appointed as the Deputy Commissioner of the Chittagong Hill Tracts, and subordinate officers were designated as Deputy Magistrates or Deputy Collectors and Sub-Deputy Magistrates or Sub-Deputy Collectors.

=== Pakistan Era ===
In 1960, under the provisions of Basic Democracy, 11 Thana Parishads and 39 Union Parishads were created in the Chittagong Hill Tracts. Later, these Thanasis were renamed upazilas. The Kaptai Hydropower Station, established in 1960, brought significant changes to the socioeconomic aspects of the local population. More than 100,000 people were affected by this project.

== Present organogram ==
The Deputy Commissioner and District Magistrate are at the top of the office hierarchy. Multiple Additional Deputy Commissioners assist the Deputy Commissioner. While many districts have five to six Additional Deputy Commissioners, the Rangamati Hill District has three. Assistant Commissioners work under the direct supervision of the Deputy Commissioner and Additional Deputy Commissioners, each overseeing different sections of the office. A Senior Assistant Commissioner serves as the Nezarat Deputy Collector. Each section includes a clerk, a member of the Lower Subordinate Staff (MLSS), bearers, and other support staff. The Senior Clerk is known as the Head Assistant of the section.

== Deputy commissioners and district magistrates who served ==
=== British Period ===
SL. No.	Name	Year
01.	Captain Magrath	1860
02.	Mr. G. Macgill	1864
03.	Mr. J.S.K. Kilby	1865
04.	Mr. T.H. Lewin	1866-69
05.	Mr. E. Raity	1869-70
06	Mr. T.H. Lewin	1871-74
07.	Mr. A.W. Power	1874-76
08.	Mr. J. Anderson	1876-77
09.	Mr. A.F. Gordon	1881
10.	Mr. L.R. Forbes	1882-84
11.	Mr. C.A.S. Reford	1884-86
12.	Mr. C. Owen	1887
13.	Mr. L.R. Forbes	1887
14.	Mr. C.S.S. Redford	1891
15.	Mr. C.S. Masray	1891
16.	Mr. F.C. Daly	1891
17.	Mr. C.S. Munay	1892
18.	Mr. J.A. Cave-Browne	1893
19.	Mr. C.S. Munay	1893
20.	Mr. R.H.S. Hutchinson	1894
21.	Mr. C.S. Munay	1894-96
22	Mr. J.A. Cave-Browne	1896
23.	Mr. W.N. Deleirgne	1897
24.	Mr. F.P. Dixon	1897
25.	Mr. J.A. Cave-Browne	1898
26.	Mr. R.H.S. Hutchinson	1899
27.	Mr. R.A. Stephen	1901
28.	Mr. R. A. Stephenson, CSI, CIE	1904
29.	Mr. R.H.S. Hutchinson	1906
30.	Mr. H.L. Fell	1908
31.	Mr. J.B. McDermott	1909
32.	Mr. R.A. Stephen	1910
33.	Mr. R. H.S. Hutchinson	1911
34.	Mr. J.W. McDermott	1911
35.	Mr. R.A. Stephen	1911
36.	Mr. O. Mawson	1912
37.	Mr. A.J.W. Hanis	1916
38.	Mr. O. Mawson	1916
39.	Mr. A.J.W. Hanis	1917
40.	Mr. O Mawson	1918
41.	Mr. A. J.W. Hanis	1919
42.	Mr. J. Younie	1920
43.	Mr. H.R. Wilkinson	1920
44.	Mr. G.A. Stevens	1922
45.	Mr. T.M. Dow	1923
46.	Mr. C.G.B. Stevens	1923
47.	Mr. A.S. Hands	1927
48.	Hon’ble Rai S.C. Basu Bahadur	1929
49.	Mr. A.S. Hands	1929
50.	Mr. S.K. Ghosh	1931
51.	Mr. W.H.T. Ghushi	1934
52.	Mr. S. Dutt	1936
53.	Mr. W.H.J. Christe	1936
54.	Lt. Col. G. L. Hyde, O.B.E.	1937
55.	Mr. A. K. Ghosh	1939

=== Pakistan Period ===
SL. No.	Name	Year
56.	Lt. Col. G. L. Hyde, O.B.E.	14-8-1947 to 31-1-1948
57.	Major L.H. Niblett	1-2-1948 to 24-12-1950
58.	Lt. Col. J. A. Hume	25-12-1950 to 15-8-1953
59.	Mr. M. H. Shah, C.S.P.	30-9-1953 to 30-6-1954
60.	Major L.H. Niblett	1-7-1954 to 11-12-1956
61.	Mr. S. Afzal Agha, C.S.P.	15-2-1957 to 21-8-1958
62.	Mr. M.A. Kareem Iqbal, C.S.P.	22-8-1958 to 12-2-1960
63.	Mr. Helaluddin Ahmed Chowdhury, C.S.P.	13-2-1960 to 24-1-1964
64.	Mr. S.Z. Khan, C.S.P.	10-2-1963 to 1-7-1964
65.	Mr. M.S. Rahman, C.S.P.	1-8-1964 to 5-8-1966
66.	Mr. L.R. Khan, C.S.P.	9-8-1966 to 23-7-1969
67.	Mr. H.T. Imam, C.S.P.	24-7-1969 to 14-05-1971

=== Bangladesh Period ===
SL. No.	Name	Year
68.	Mr. Aminul Islam, C.S.P.	15-5-1971 to 15-12-1971
69.	Mr. M. E. Sharif	26-12-1971 to 20-03-1972
70.	Mr. Jinnat Ali	21–03.1972 to 10.05.1973
71.	Mr. M. Sharafath Ullah	11-05-1973 to 16–04.1974
72.	Mr. A. M. A. Kadir	17-04-1974 to 09-01-1976
73.	Mr. Ali Haider Khan	09-01-1976 to 06-03-1983
74.	Mr. M. A. Malek	18.04.1983 to 03.09.1985
75.	Mr. Md. Shafiqul Islam	03-09-1985 to 22-01-1990
76.	Mr. Md. Aftabuddin	22-01-1990 to 02-07-1992
77.	Mr. Mohammed Hasan	02-07-1992 to 30-11-1995
78.	Mr. Md. Kamal Uddin	02-12-1995 to 24-04-1996
79.	Mr. Shah Alam	24-04-1996 to 08-09-1999
80.	Mr. Md. Abu Haider Sardar	08-09-1999 to 09-07-2001
81.	Mr. Md. Azmal Hossain	10-07-2001 to 05-08-2001
82.	Dr. Zafar Ahmed Khan	06-08-2001 to 15-02-2005
83.	Gazi Mohammad Julhash	15-02-2005 to 28-08-2006
84.	Mr. Harun-Ur-Rashid Khan	29-08-2006 to 16-05-2007
85.	Mr. Md. Nurul Amin	16-05-2007 to 24-03-2009
86.	Mr. Saurendra Nath Chakrabhartty	24-03-2009 to 27/05/2012
87.	Md. Mostafa Kamal	28/05/2012 to 24/12/2014
88.	Md. Shamsul Arefin	24/12/2014 to 17/09/2016
89.	Md. Mohammad Manzarul Mannan	18/09/2016 to present

== Functions ==
=== Law and order ===
The District Magistrate plays a vital role in maintaining law, order, and discipline. The rules and regulations of the country grant significant authority to the District Magistrate. The District Magistrate serves as the Chairperson of the District Law and Order Committee, while the Superintendent of Police of the district is the Vice Chairman. The District Magistrate also reports to the Cabinet regarding the law and order situation in the district, according to the Police Regulations of Bengal.

=== Land administration ===
District Administration originally focused primarily on collecting land revenue. The administrative system was established by the East India Company for this purpose. Over time, criminal prosecution, administration, coordination of government offices, and development activities were added to the responsibilities of district administration. The Deputy Commissioner, serving as the district collector, collects revenue within the jurisdiction of the district. Rangamati, as part of the Chittagong Hill Tracts, maintains a different revenue collection system compared to other districts in the country.

== Innovation in services ==
=== Mid-day meal ===
The District Administration has initiated various programs to bring about positive changes in the educational sector of the district. Currently, the administration provides support to underprivileged students in the district.

=== Distribution of free school dress to students ===
The Rangamati District Administration has initiated a program to distribute school uniforms to primary school students. This program, led by the Deputy Commissioner of Rangamati, includes the distribution of school bags, umbrellas, and uniforms to hundreds of students. The aim of this program is to reduce student dropout rates and encourage parents to send their children to school by creating a sense of appreciation and support.

== Bungalow of the Deputy Commissioner & District Magistrate ==
=== Bungalow Museum ===
The DC Bungalow Museum was established in 2010 by the then Deputy Commissioner of Rangamati, Mr. Saurendra Nath Chakraborty. The museum was inaugurated by H. T. Imam, the first Cabinet Secretary of Bangladesh, who was also the Deputy Commissioner of the Chittagong Hill Tracts in 1969. The museum exhibits photographs of all the Deputy Commissioners and includes items such as a British-era typewriter and a hundred-year-old weight. Additionally, the museum has a collection of government-published calendars from the past 50 years.

== Circuit House ==
The Circuit House in Rangamati is under the supervision of the Deputy Commissioner. It is considered one of the best circuit houses in the country. The circuit house features six rooms, all of which are equipped with modern amenities and are fully air-conditioned.

== BIAM Laboratory School ==
The BIAM Laboratory School is a joint venture between the District Administration of Rangamati and the Bangladesh Institute of Administration and Management (BIAM) Foundation, Dhaka. The school was established in 2012. Md. Mostafa Kamal, the former Deputy Commissioner of Rangamati, took the initiative to establish a quality English medium school in Rangamati. The BIAM School has its own campus in the Tabalchari area. The Assistant Commissioner of the Education and Welfare Section serves as the principal of the school.
