= Mujibur Rahman (politician, born 1941) =

Bangladeshi politician

Mojibur Rahman

Member of the Bangladesh Parliament for Lalmonirhat-2
- In office 7 May 1986 – 15 February 1996
- Preceded by: Position established
- Succeeded by: Saleh Uddin Ahmed
- In office 12 June 1996 – 5 January 2014
- Preceded by: Saleh Uddin Ahmed
- Succeeded by: Nuruzzaman Ahmed

Member of the Bangladesh Parliament for Rangpur-6
- In office 18 February 1979 – 12 February 1982
- Preceded by: Karim Uddin Mohammad
- Succeeded by: Seats abolished

Personal details
- Born: 13 October 1941
- Died: 30 January 2016 (aged 80) Dhaka, Bangladesh
- Party: Jatiya Party (Ershad)
- Other political affiliations: Bangladesh Nationalist Party

Mojibur Rahman (13 October 1941–30 January 2016) was a Jatiya Party (Ershad) politician and the former Member of Parliament for Lalmonirhat-2. He served 7 terms.

== Career ==
Rahman was elected Member of Parliament from Lalmonirhat-2 constituency on the nomination of Jatiya Party in the 3rd Jatiya Sangsad of 1986, 4th of 1988, 5th of 1991, 7th of 12 June 1996, 8th of 2001 and 9th of 2008.

Before the creation of Lalmonirhat-2, Rahman was elected to the 2nd Jatiya Sangsad from Rangpur-6 as a Bangladesh Nationalist Party candidate in 1979.

Brig Gen (Retd) Md Shamim Kamal is his son.
