= Nuruzzaman Ahmed =

Bangladeshi politician (born 1950)

- নুরুজ্জামান আহমেদ
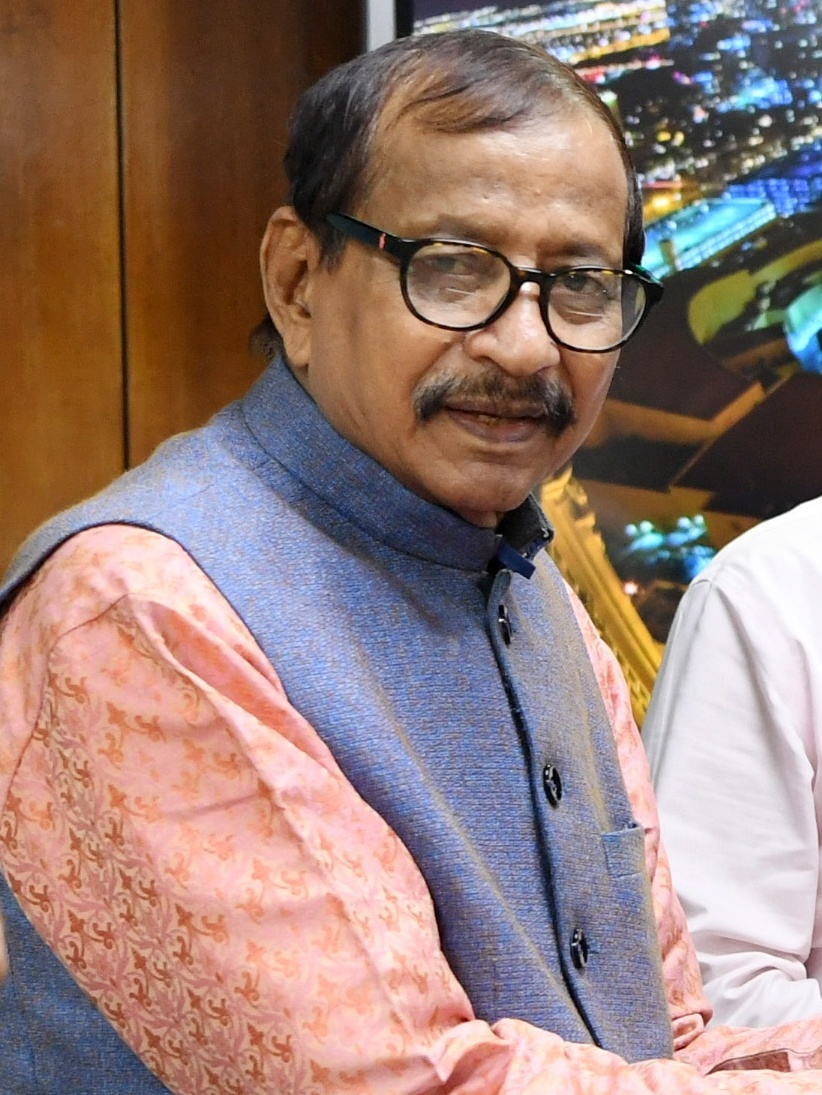
- Ahmed in 2023

Member of the Bangladesh Parliament for Lalmonirhat-2
- In office 29 January 2014 – 6 August 2024
- Preceded by: Mojibur Rahman
- Succeeded by: Rokon Uddin Babul

Minister of Social Welfare
- In office 7 January 2019 – 11 January 2024 (State Minister: 19 June 2016 - 7 January 2019)
- Preceded by: Rashed Khan Menon
- Succeeded by: Dipu Moni

State Minister of Food
- In office 14 July 2015 – 19 June 2016

Personal details
- Born: 3 January 1950 (age 76)
- Party: Bangladesh Awami League
- Spouse: Hosne Ara Begum
- Children: 3
- Parent: Karim Uddin Mohammad (father)

Nuruzzaman Ahmed (born 3 January 1950) is a Bangladesh Awami League politician and a former Jatiya Sangsad member representing the Lalmonirhat-2 constituency during 2014–2024. Earlier, he served as the minister of social welfare and the state minister of social welfare and state minister of food.

== Background ==
Ahmed's father, Karim Uddin Ahmed, served as a Jatiya Sangsad member from the Rangpur-6 constituency during 1973-1975.

== Career ==
Ahmed became the Minister of State in the Ministry of Food on 14 July 2015, a year after becoming a member of parliament. He held the post from 21 June 2016 to 7 January 2019. After winning the Eleventh Parliamentary Election, he has been serving as a Minister of the same Ministry since 7 January 2019.

According to a report published by Prothom Alo in September 2023, Ahmed's family had unpaid electricity bill of Tk 9 lakh. In August 2023, Rocky Chandra Roy, an executive engineer of Nesco Kaliganj Sales & Distribution Division, accused Rakibuzzaman for assaulting him.

Ahmed was arrested in January 2025 following the fall of the Sheikh Hasina led Awami League government.

== Personal life ==
Ahmed is married to Hosne Ara Begum. They have three children including Rakibuzzaman Ahmed.
