= Lalmonirhat District =

District of Rangpur Division in Bangladesh

Lalmonirhat District লালমনিরহাট জেলা
- District of Bangladesh
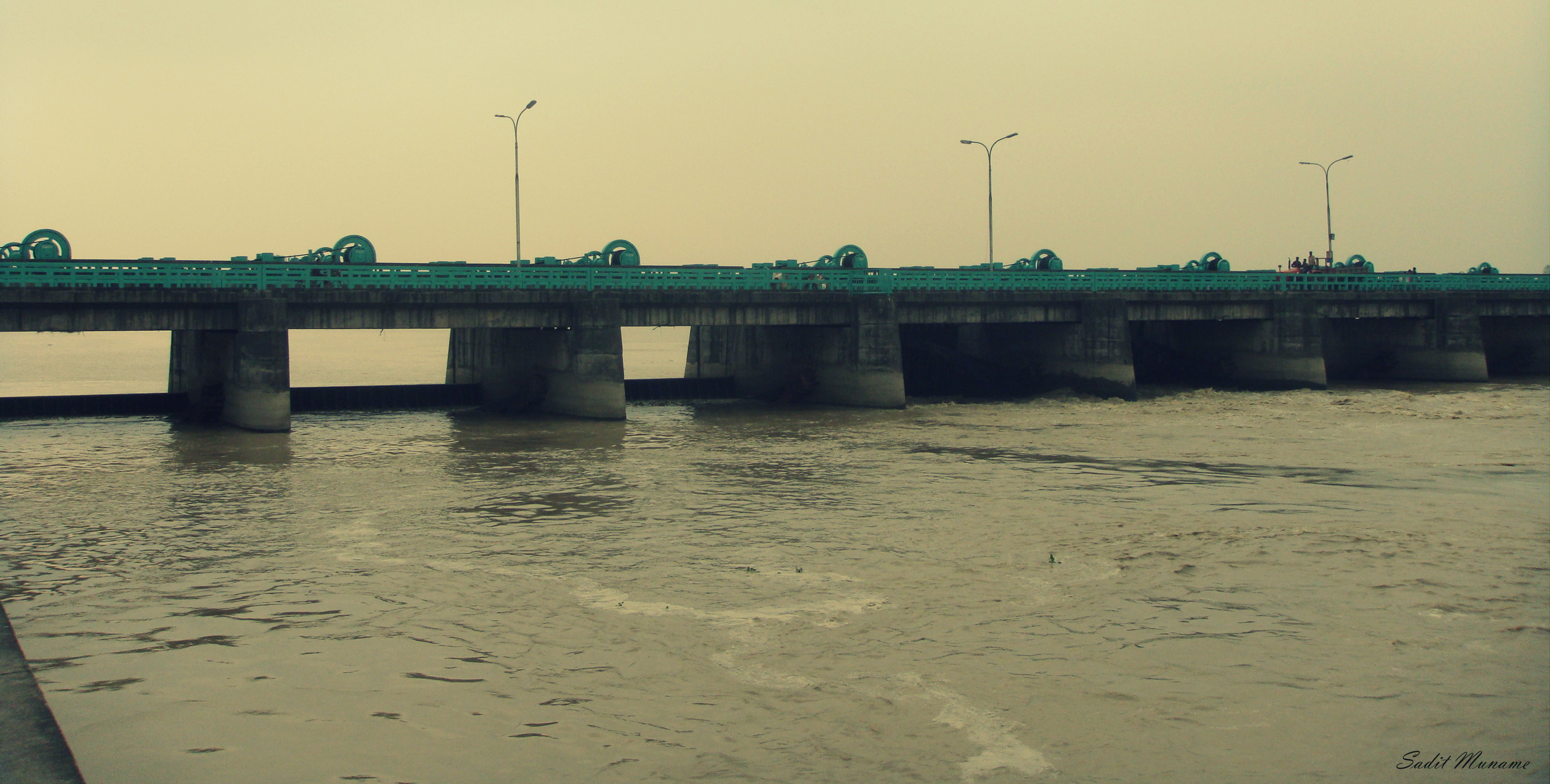
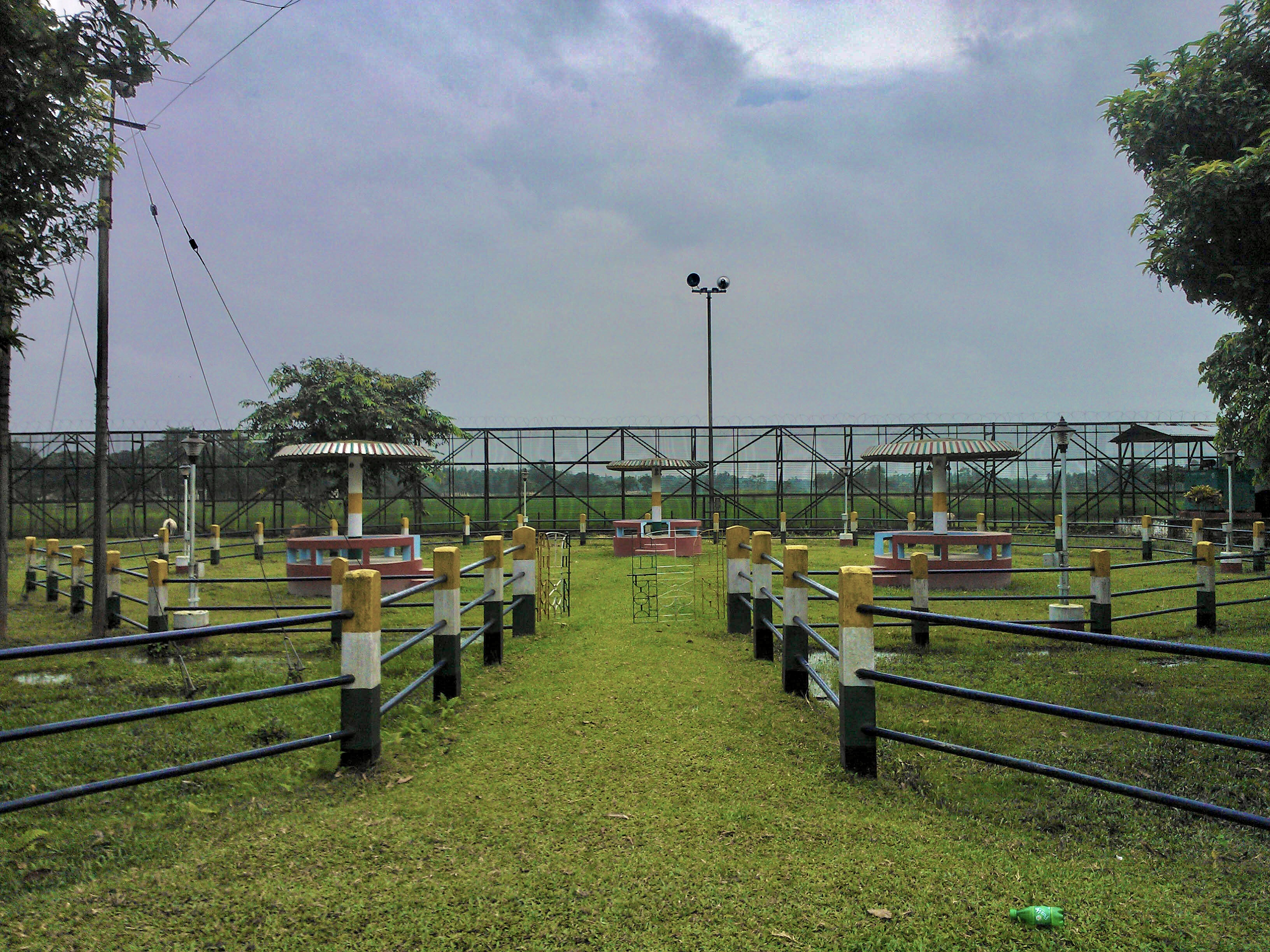
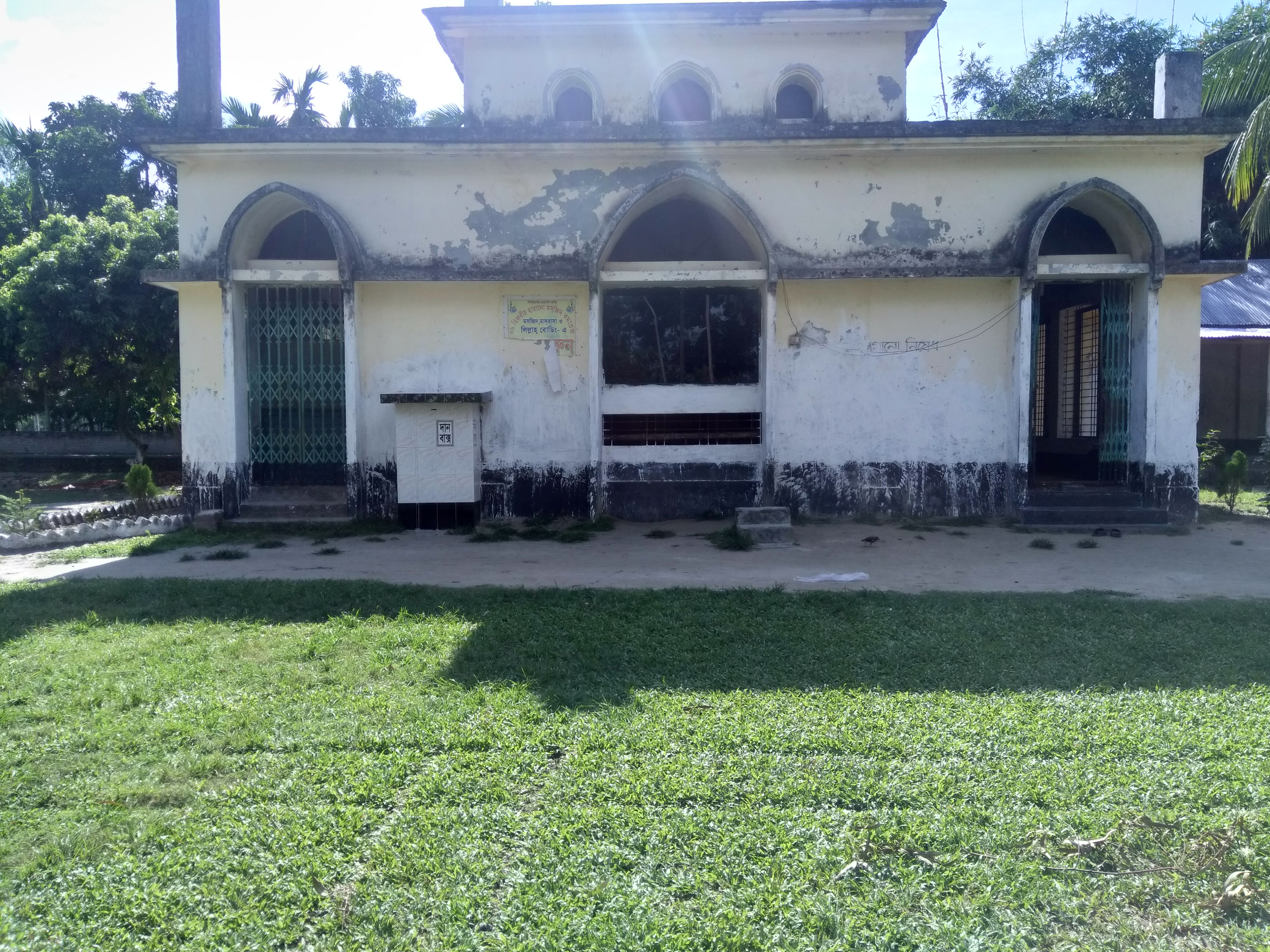
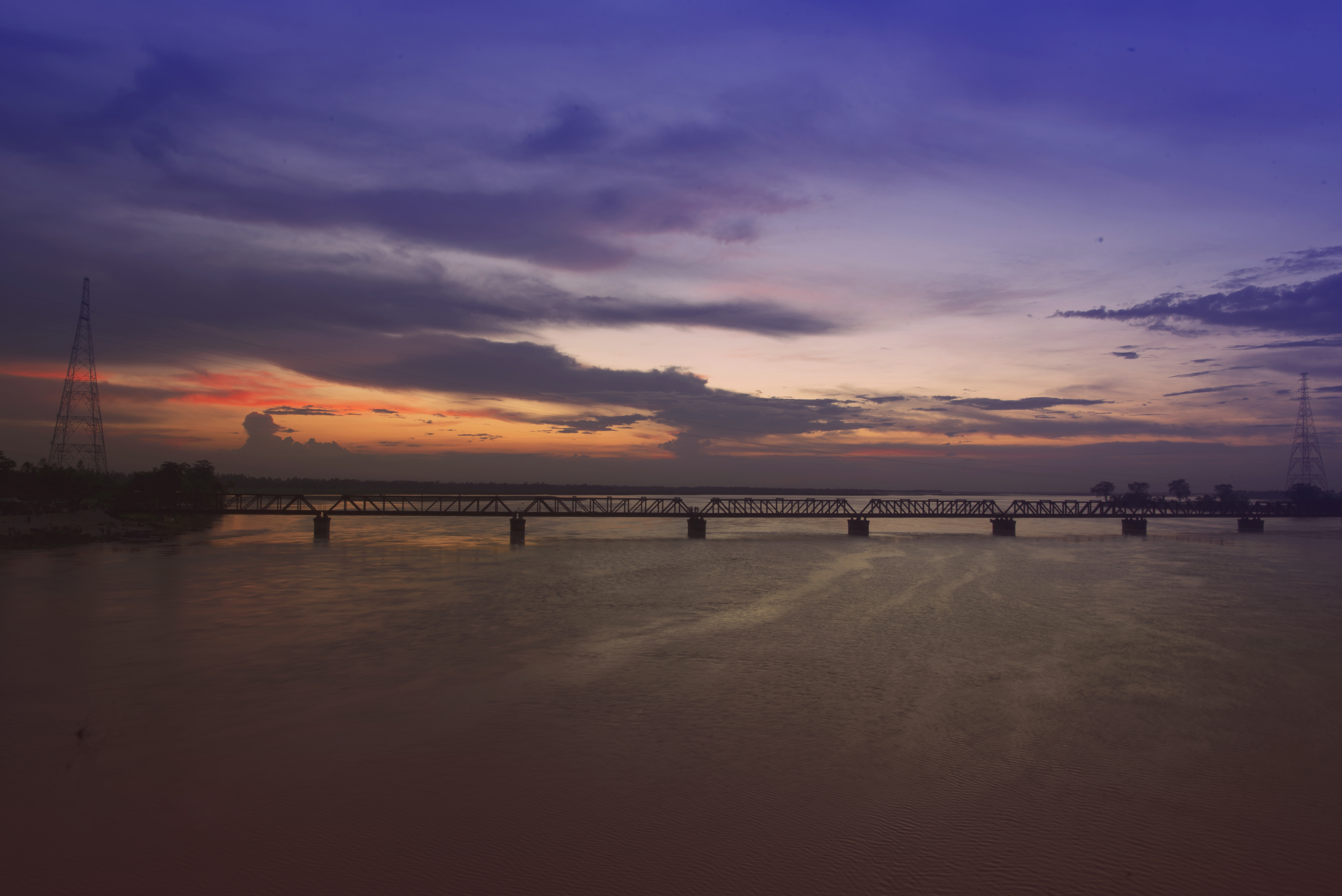
- Teesta Barrage Tin Bigha Corridor The Lost Mosque Teesta Railway Bridge

- Location of Lalmonirhat District in Bangladesh
- Interactive map of Lalmonirhat District
- Coordinates: 26.00°N 89.25°E
- Country: Bangladesh
- Division: Rangpur Division
- Established: 1 February 1984
- Headquarters: Lalmonirhat

Area
  - Total: 1,247.37 km^{2} (481.61 sq mi)

Population (2022)
  - Total: 1,428,406
  - Density: 1,145.13/km^{2} (2,965.88/sq mi)
- Time zone: UTC+06:00 (BST)
- Postal code: 5500
- Area code: 0591
- ISO 3166 code: BD-32

Lalmonirhat District upazila geocode map

Lalmonirhat District (Bengali: লালমনিরহাট জেলা) is a District, situated at the northern border of Bangladesh. It is a part of the Rangpur Division. Lalmonirhat mahakuma was established as a district on 1 February 1984. To the north of Lalmonirhat lie Cooch Behar and Jalpaiguri districts of West Bengal; to the south lies Rangpur, to the east lie Kurigram and Cooch Behar; and to the west of lie Rangpur and Nilphamari District. The international border line of Lalmonirhat district is 281.6 km long.

== Etymology ==
At the end of 19th century, the workers of the Bengal Duras Railway (BDR) while digging the mud for the installation of rail line, found a red color stone and since then, the place was recognized as Lalmoni. Whereas some legendary opinions that the railway which acquire the land owned by a lady named Lalmoni for which people kept the place after her name as the recognition of her contribution of land for the rail line. Others are of the opinion that in 1783, a woman named Lalmoni along with peasant leader, Nuruldin fought against the English soldiers and land lords for the cause to establish the interest of general peasants and laid down her life against the atrocity of the rulers. The place was named as the Lalmoni as the sign of respect. The word "hat" became adhered to her name in the course of time.

== History ==
Lalmonirhat emerged as a district from mahakuma by the inauguration of then gender and social welfare minister of Bangladesh government Dr. Safia Khatun on 1 February 1984. After that Lalmonirhat sadar thana was established as a upazila on 18 March 1984. As a result, the number of upazilas in Lalmonirhat district becomes 5 which are Patgram, Hatibandha, Kaliganj, Aditmari and Lalmonirhat Sadar. In that time, Sinai, Rajarhat and Gharialdanga union was added to Kurigram District and the number of union of Lalmonirhat district and municipalities becomes 41 and 1 respectively. Alongside the area of Lalmonirhat Sadar becomes 104 sq. miles. After 1985, Dahagram and Angarpota enclaves became a single union of Patgram upazila and then the total number of union becomes 42.

== Geography ==
Lalmonirhat is in the north of Bangladesh and lies in the Teesta floodplain, and largely consists of agricultural land. There are six rivers in Lalmonirhat district. Teesta is one of the main rivers in this district and forms the southwestern border of the district. The total length of Tista river is 315 km, 115 km of which is in Bangladesh. The total arable land is 98,875 hectares.

== Subdistricts ==
There are 5 upazilas, 5 thanas, 45 unions, 354 mouzas and 478 villages in Lalmonirhat. The upazilas are:

- Lalmonirhat Sadar has an area of 259.54 km^{2}. It lies north of Kochbihar of India and Aditmari upazila of Kurigram district, south of Kaunia upazila of Rangpur district and Rajarhat upazila of Kurigram district, east of Phulbai and Rajarhat upazila of Kurigram district, west of Aditmari upazila of Lalmonirhat district and Gangachara upazila of Rangpur district.
- Aditmari has an area of 190.03 km^{2}. It lies north of Kochbihar district of India, south of Gangachara upazila of Rangpur district, east of Lalmonirhat Sadar upazila, west of Kaliganj upazila.
- Kaliganj has an area of 236.96 km^{2}. It lies north of Kochbihar district of India and Hatibandha upazila of Lalmonirhat, south of Gangachara upazila of Rangpur and Kishorganj upazila of Nilphamari district, east of Aditmari upazila, west of Jaldhaka upazila of Nilphamari district.
- Hatibandha has an area of 288.42 km^{2}. It lies north of Kochbihar district of India and Patgram upazila of Lalmonirhat, south of Kaliganj upazila, east of Kochbihar district of India, west of Dimla and Jaldhaka upazila of Nilphamari.
- Patgram has an area of 261.51. It lies north, east and west of Kochbihar district of India and Hatibandha upazila.

== Demographics ==
Historical population
Year	Pop.	±% p.a.
1974	628,089	—
1981	766,307	+2.88%
1991	953,460	+2.21%
2001	1,109,343	+1.53%
2011	1,256,099	+1.25%
2022	1,428,406	+1.18%

According to the 2022 Census of Bangladesh, Lalmonirhat District had 342,028 households and a population of 1,428,406, of whom, 20.42% of the inhabitants lived in urban areas. 18.43% of the population was under 10 years of age. The population density was 1,145 people per km^{2}. The literacy rate (age 7 and over) was 71.30%, compared to the national average of 74.80% and the sex ratio was 100.09 males per 100 females. The ethnic population was 118.

Religions in Lalmonirhat District (2022)
Religion	Percent
Islam	86.98%
Hinduism	12.97%
Other or not stated	0.05%

Religion in present-day Lalmonirhat District
Religion	1941 (Note: 1941 figures are for Lalmonirhat, Kaliganj and Hatibandha thanas of erstwhile Rangpur district and Patgram thana of erstwhile Jalpaiguri district. District and thana borders have shifted slightly since.)		1981		1981		2001		2011		2022	
Religion	Pop.	%	Pop.	%	Pop.	%	Pop.	%	Pop.	%	Pop.	%
Islam	188,631	52.90%	633,073	82.61%	792,843	83.15%	941,186	84.84%	1,080,512	86.02%	1,242,388	86.98%
Hinduism	167,158	46.88%	132,023	17.23%	157,149	16.48%	166,720	15.03%	174,558	13.90%	185,322	12.97%
Others (Note: Including Jainism, Christianity, Buddhism, Zoroastrianism, Judaism, Ad-Dharmis, or not stated)	777	0.22%	1,211	0.16%	3,468	0.37%	1,437	0.13%	1,029	0.08%	696	0.05%
Total Population	356,566	100%	766,307	100%	953,460	100%	1,109,343	100%	1,256,099	100%	1,428,406	100%

Muslims make up 86.98% of the population, while Hindus are 12.97% of the population. There is a small population of 630 Christians, mainly in Lalmonirhat town.

The dialect of the region is Rangpuria.

== Education ==
Lalmonirhat has 1 university, 2 colleges, 212 secondary schools, 754 primary schools, 85 madrasas, 3 polytechnical institutes, 1 textile institute and 1 technical school and college. Lalmonirhat is one of the seven illiteracy-free districts in Bangladesh. The literacy rate of Lalmonirhat is 65%.

== Economy ==
Agriculture is the major income source. 72.78% of people are farmers, 10.49% are businessmen, 3.46% are labourers, and 4.45% are employees.

== Notable people ==
- Sheikh Fazlul Karim, Bangladeshi poet
