= Dupchanchia Government Pilot Model High School =

Dupchanchia Government Pilot Model High School, Bogra
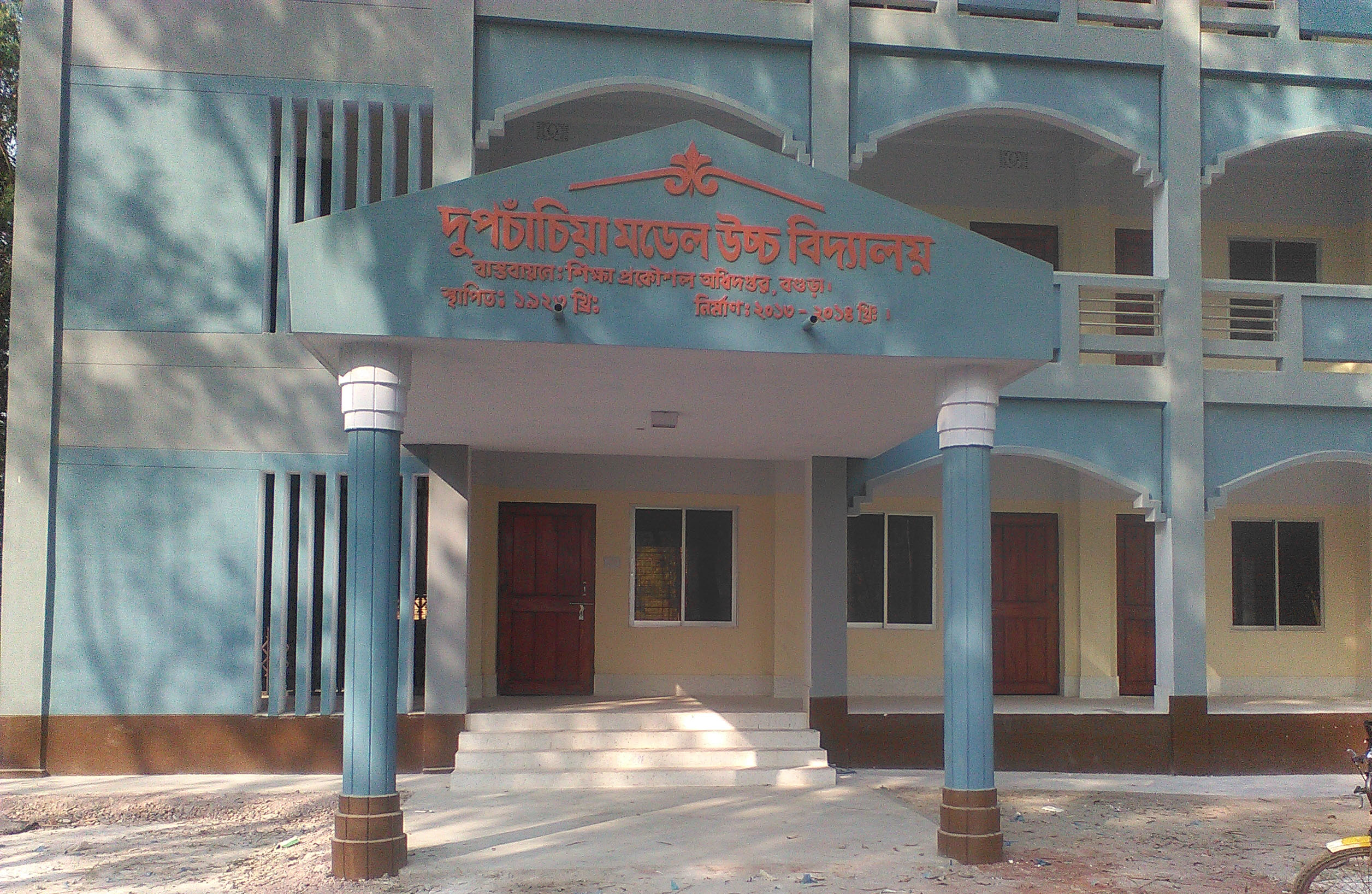

Location
- Thanaroad, Dupchanchia; Bangladesh; 24.8738°N 89.1800°E

Information
- Established: 1923 AD
- School district: Bogra
- Staff: 16
- Grades: 6 to 10(SSC)
- Enrollment: 693
- Athletics: Football, cricket
- Nickname: Dupchanchia Government Pilot Model High School (DGMPHS)

Dupchanchia Government Pilot Model High School (Bengali: দুপচাঁচিয়া সরকারি পাইলট মডেল উচ্চ বিদ্যালয়) is one of the oldest high schools of Dupchanchia Upazila in the Bogra district of Bangladesh. It is situated on the bank of the river Nagor.

== Location ==
The school is situated near the police station of Dupchanchia on the bank of river Nagar. It is 20 kilometres (12 mi) from Bogra city.

== Notable alumni ==
- Ramendra Kumar Podder, Vice Chancellor of the University of Calcutta (20 June 1979 to 30 December 1983)

== Gallery ==
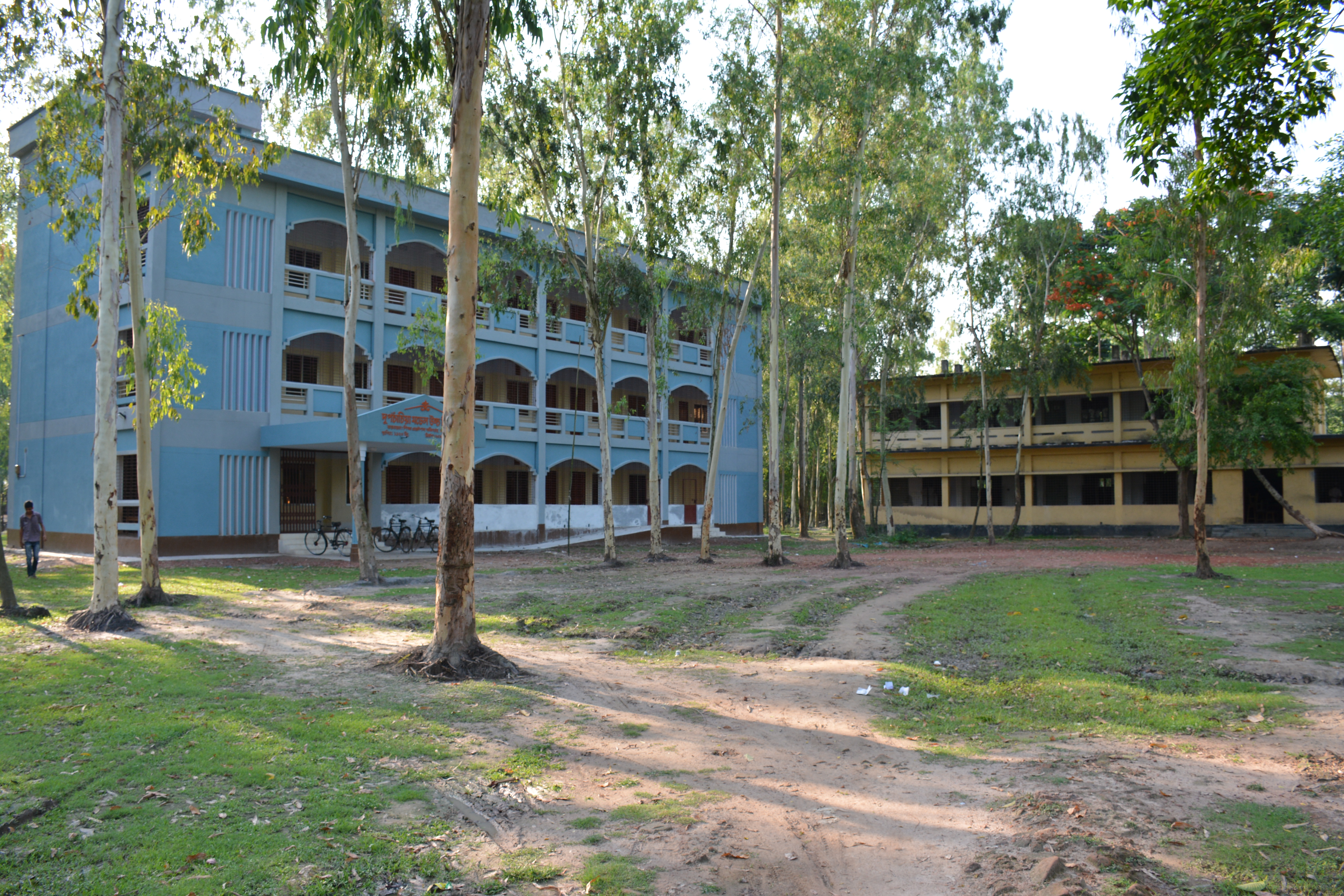
School's Academics

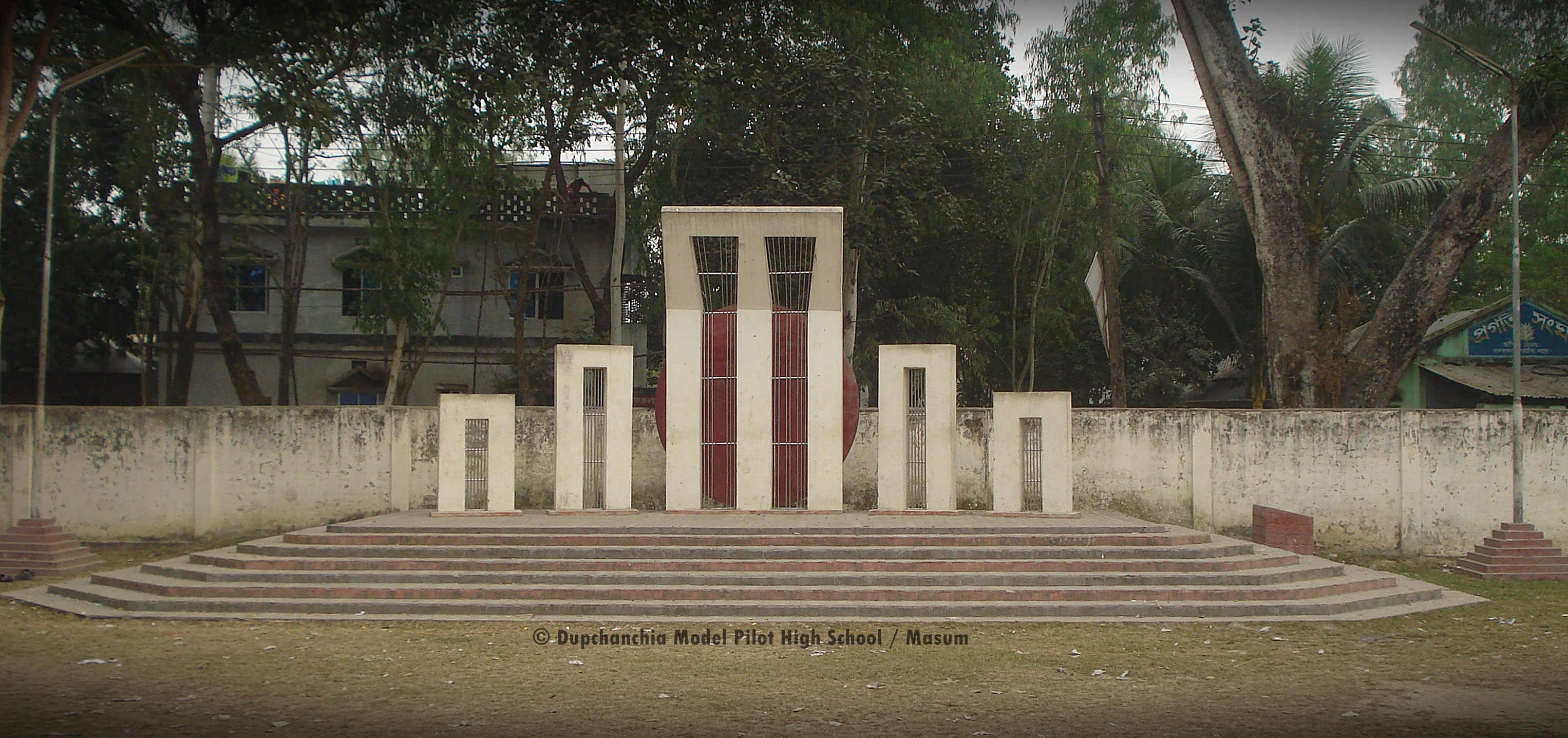
Shahid Minar
