= Kahaloo Upazila =

Kahaloo কাহালু
- Upazila
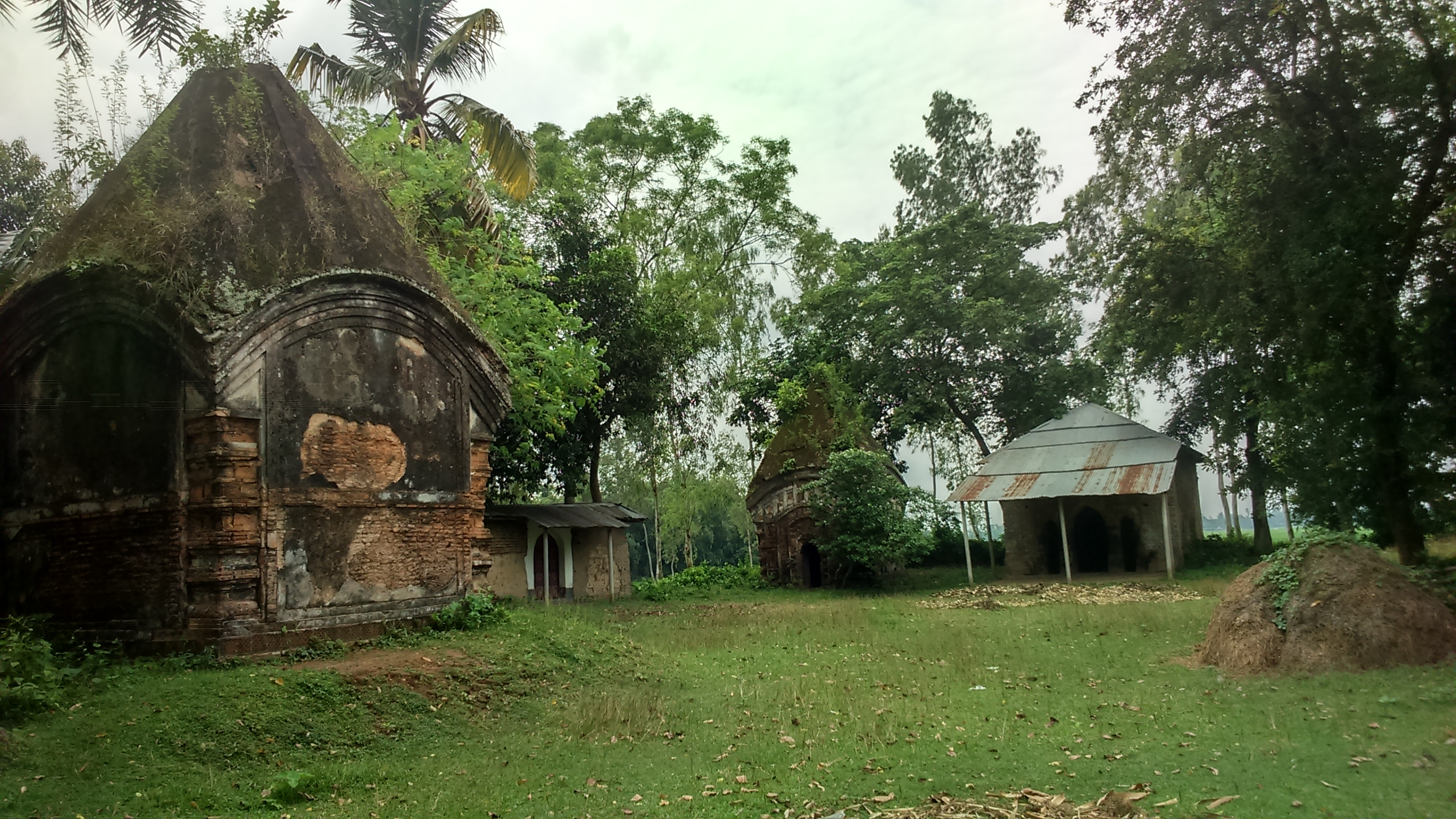
- Jugir Bhaban

- Coordinates: 24°49′N 89°16′E
- Country: Bangladesh
- Division: Rajshahi
- District: Bogra

Area
  - Total: 240.42 km^{2} (92.83 sq mi)

Population (2022)
  - Total: 234,585
  - Density: 975.73/km^{2} (2,527.1/sq mi)
- Time zone: UTC+6 (BST)
- Postal code: 5870
- Website: kahaloo.bogra.gov.bd(in Bengali)

Kahaloo Upazila mauza geocode map

Kahaloo Upazila (Bengali: কাহালু উপজেলা) is an upazila of Bogra District in the Division of Rajshahi, Bangladesh. Kahaloo Thana was established in 1928 and was converted into an upazila in 1983. It is named after its administrative center, the town of Kahaloo.

== Geography ==
Kahaloo Upazila has a total area of 240.42 square kilometres (92.83 sq mi). It is bounded on the west by the Nagar River (across which lies Dhupchanchia Upazila). It borders Shibganj Upazila to the north, Bogra Sadar and Shajahanpur upazilas to the east, Nandigram Upazila to the southwest, and Adamdighi Upazila to the west.

== Demographics ==
Historical population
Year	Pop. (000)	±%
1981	146	—
1991	183	+25.3%
2001	196	+7.1%
2011	222	+13.3%
2022	235	+5.9%
Source: Bangladesh Bureau of Statistics

Religions in Kahaloo Upazila (2022)
Religion	Percent
Islam	93.95%
Hinduism	6.05%
Other or not stated	0.00%

According to the 2022 Bangladeshi census, Kahaloo Upazila had 65,285 households and a population of 234,585. 7.68% of the population were under 5 years of age. Kahaloo had a literacy rate (age 7 and over) of 74.96%: 77.91% for males and 72.09% for females, and a sex ratio of 98.12 males for every 100 females. 27,359 (11.66%) lived in urban areas.

According to the 2011 Census of Bangladesh, Kahaloo Upazila had 58,261 households and a population of 222,376. 43,958 (19.77%) were under 10 years of age. Kahaloo had a literacy rate (age 7 and over) of 52.07%, compared to the national average of 51.8%, and a sex ratio of 1009 females per 1000 males. 13,887 (6.24%) lived in urban areas.

The total number of voters in Kahalu upazila is 1,46,786. Of these, 71,501 are male voters and 85,265 are female voters.

== Administration ==
Kahaloo Upazila is divided into Kahaloo Municipality and nine union parishads: Bir Kedar, Durgapur, Jamgaon, Kahaloo, Kalai Majh Para, Malancha, Murail, Narahatta, and Paikar. The union parishads are subdivided into 161 mauzas and 264 villages.

Kahaloo Municipality is subdivided into 9 wards and 19 mahallas.

== Transport ==
Railway stations Panchpir Mazar and Kahaloo are on the branch line connecting Santahar and Kaunia . In July 2014 they were served by six or eight intercity and six mail trains a day.

== Education ==
There are four colleges in the upazila. They include Azizul Haque Memorial Degree College, Dargahat Degree College, and Kahaloo Adarsha Women's Degree College. Kahaloo Degree College is the only honors level college in the upazila.

The madrasa education system here includes five fazil madrasas.

== See also ==
- Upazilas of Bangladesh
- Districts of Bangladesh
- Divisions of Bangladesh
