= Nandigram Upazila =

Nandigram নন্দীগ্রাম
- Upazila
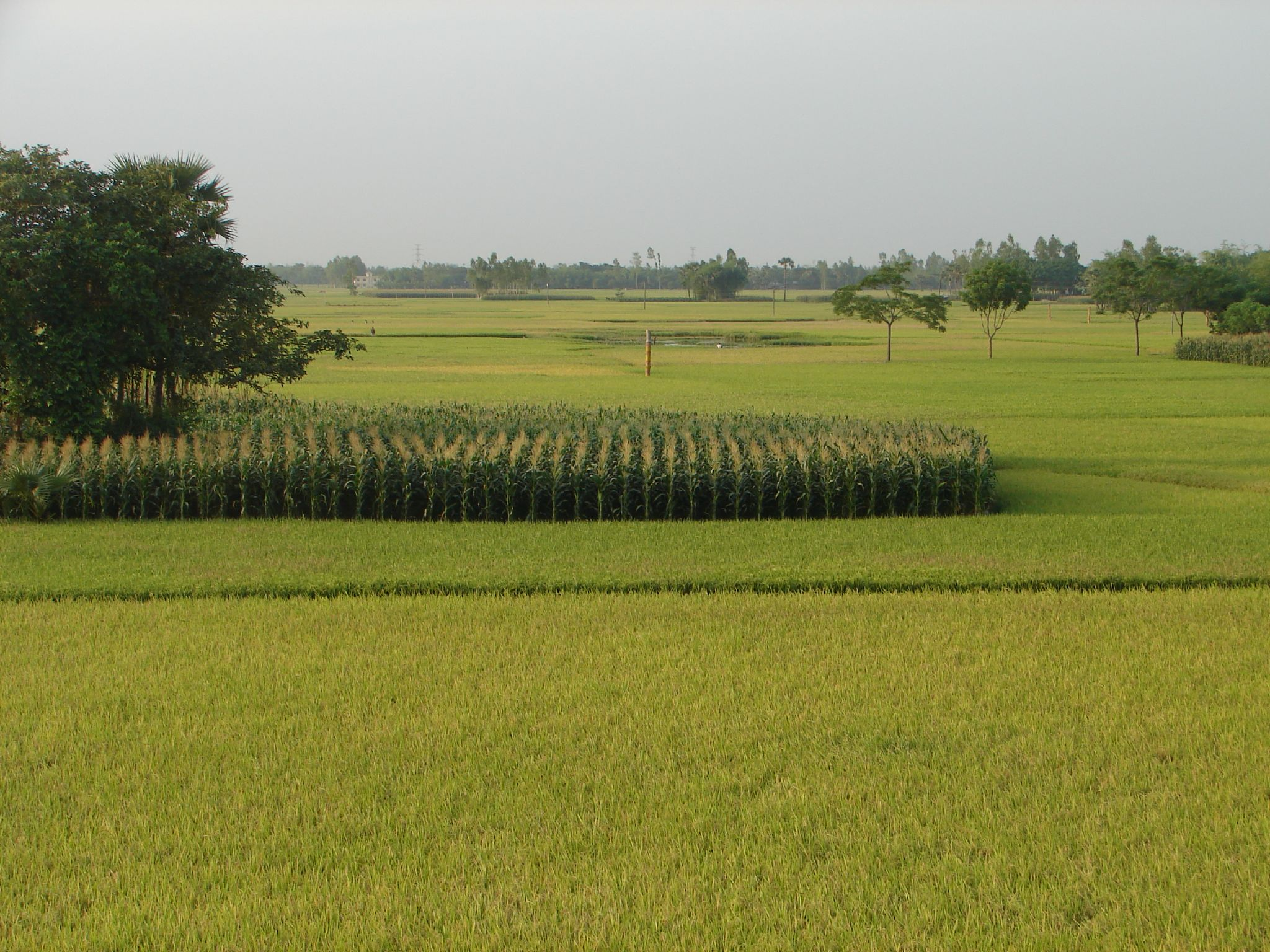
- Crop Fields in Nandigram Upazila

- Coordinates: 24°40′N 89°14′E
- Country: Bangladesh
- Division: Rajshahi
- District: Bogra

Area
  - Total: 265.22 km^{2} (102.40 sq mi)

Population (2022)
  - Total: 200,294
  - Density: 755.20/km^{2} (1,956.0/sq mi)
- Time zone: UTC+6 (BST)
- Postal code: 5860
- Area code: 051
- Website: nondigram.bogra.gov.bd(in Bengali)

Nandigram Upazila mauza geocode map

Nandigram Upazila (Bengali: নন্দীগ্রাম উপজেলা) is an upazila of Bogra District in the Division of Rajshahi, Bangladesh. Nandigram Thana was established in 1932 and was converted into an upazila in 1983. It is named after its administrative center, the town of Nandigram.

== Geography ==
Nandigram Upazila has a total area of 265.22 square kilometres (102.40 sq mi). It is bounded on the west by the Nagar River (across which lies Naogaon District). It borders Kahaloo and Shajahanpur upazilas to the north, Sherpur Upazila to the east, Natore District to the south and west, and Adamdighi Upazila to the west.

== Demographics ==
Historical population
Year	Pop. (000)	±%
1981	125	—
1991	148	+18.4%
2001	168	+13.5%
2011	181	+7.7%
2022	200	+10.5%
Source: Bangladesh Bureau of Statistics

Religions in Nandigram Upazila (2022)
Religion	Percent
Islam	88.28%
Hinduism	11.71%
Other or not stated	0.01%

According to the 2022 Bangladeshi census, Nandigram Upazila had 53,818 households and a population of 200,294. 7.57% of the population were under 5 years of age. Nandigram had a literacy rate (age 7 and over) of 72.02%: 75.68% for males and 68.41% for females, and a sex ratio of 99.12 males for every 100 females. 28,874 (14.42%) lived in urban areas.

According to the 2011 Census of Bangladesh, Nandigram Upazila had 45,853 households and a population of 180,802. 35,156 (19.44%) were under 10 years of age. Nandigram had a literacy rate (age 7 and over) of 47.51%, compared to the national average of 51.8%, and a sex ratio of 1000 females per 1000 males. 18,496 (10.23%) lived in urban areas. Ethnic population was 1,906 (1.05%), of which Barman were 881, Oraon 401 and Santal 189.

== Administration ==
Nandigram Upazila is divided into Nandigram Municipality and five union parishads: Bhatgram, Bhatra, Burail, Nandigram, and Thalta Majhgram. The union parishads are subdivided into 192 mauzas and 228 villages.

Nandigram Municipality is subdivided into 9 wards and 22 mahallas.

== Education ==
There are four colleges in the upazila. They include Hat Karai Degree College, Monsur Hossain Degree College, and Nandigram Mohilla College.and Nimaidighi adarsha college.

The madrasa education system includes four fazil madrasas and the Jamur Islamia Senior Alim Madrasah.

== See also ==
- Upazilas of Bangladesh
- Districts of Bangladesh
- Divisions of Bangladesh
