= Bogura District Jail =

Prison in Bangladesh

- Interactive map of Bogura District Jail
- Location: Jaleshwari Tala and Maltinagar, Bogura, Bogura District, Bangladesh; 24.8452°N 89.3785°E
- Security class: Medium
- Opened: 1883
- Managed by: Bangladesh Jail
- Website: prison.bogra.gov.bd/en

Bogura District Jail, formerly known as Bogra Jail, is the central jail of Bogura District which has a population of 3.4 million people. Faruk Ahmed is the jailer in charge of Bogura District Jail.

== History ==
Bogura District Jail was established by the British Colonial administration in 1883 on the banks of Karatoya River in Jaleshwari Tala and Maltinagar of Bogura. The town was established in 1850 and became a municipality in 1884. The colonial administration described the jail as the cheapest one to operate in its category. In 1907, a decision was taken to increase the size of Bogura District Jail. In the early 20th century, the jail opened a night school for the inmates.

In 1966, Sheikh Mujibur Rahman, detained in Dacca Central Jail, wrote a letter to Nurul Islam Chowdhury, detained in Bogura District Jail. The letter was seized by the Special Branch of the Pakistan Police.

During the 1977 Bogra mutiny, soldiers attacked the Bogura District Jail to release 17 soldiers who were detained after a previous mutiny.

Former Minister, Abdul Latif Siddiqui, was sent to this jail here in June 2019 in a corruption case.

During the COVID-19 pandemic in Bangladesh, the jail released 99 prisoners to stop the spread of COVID-19 behind bars.

In February 2024, a man accused of rape killed himself inside the prison by hanging. In June 2024, four death row convicts escaped from Bogura District Jail only to be detained within a couple of hours of their escape. Four guards were suspended, a departmental case was filed against three guards, and Jailer Faridur Rahman Rubel was closed over the escape.

Following the fall of the Sheikh Hasina led Awami League government, Awami League leaders were imprisoned here. Shahidul Islam Ratan, the 55 year old general secretary of Bogura Ward No 15 unit of Awami League, and Abdul Latif, treasurer of Shibganj Upazila unit of Awami League, and Shahadat Alam Jhunu, former principal of Bogura Police Lines School and College and organising secretary of Bogura District unit of Awami League, died in Bogura District Jail in November 2024. Former chairman of Durgahata Union Parishad, Abdul Matin Mithu, died in pre-trial custody. In total four Awami League leaders died in the prison and former member of parliament Ragebul Ahsan Ripu had a cardiac arrest at the jail. The Daily Star called on the prison authorities to respect basic human rights and ensure prisoners have access to healthcare.

== Infrastructure and capacity ==
While the prison has a capacity 720 inmates it houses 1700 inmates. The Condemned cell is housed in Jaflong which is the oldest building in the prison complex. According to the additional inspector general of prisons Colonel Sheikh Sujaur Rahman, in charge of Bogura Jail, reported that the roof was leaking in Jaflong but no steps had been taken to renovate the building despite repeated requests of the prison authorities in June 2024.

The trash and sewage from the prison is directly dumped into Karatoya River polluting it. The Jail Super Anwar Hossain defended it saying not just the jail but the whole city is dumping in the river.
