= Bogra District =

Bogura District বগুড়া জেলা
- District of Bangladesh
- Bogura District
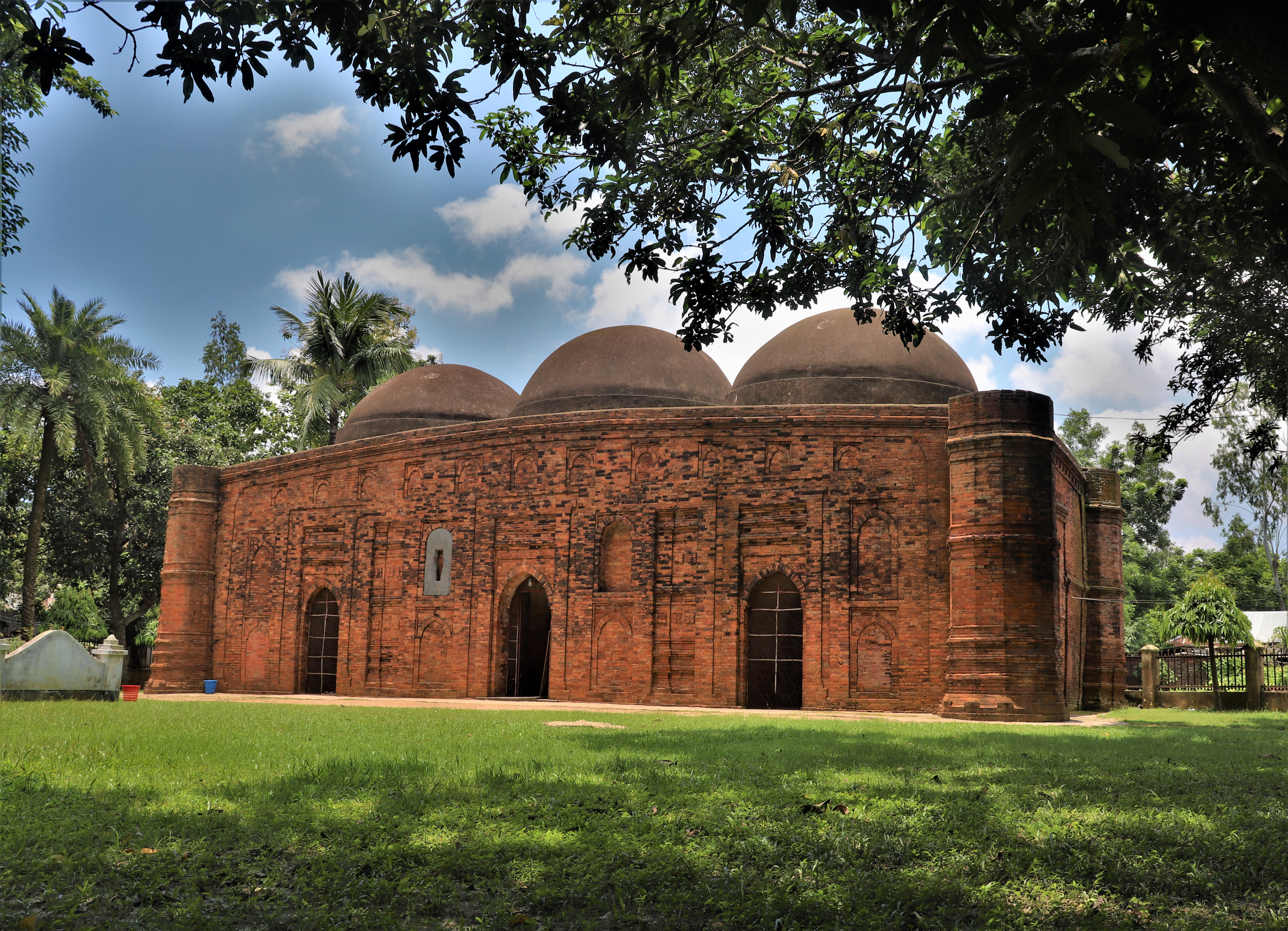
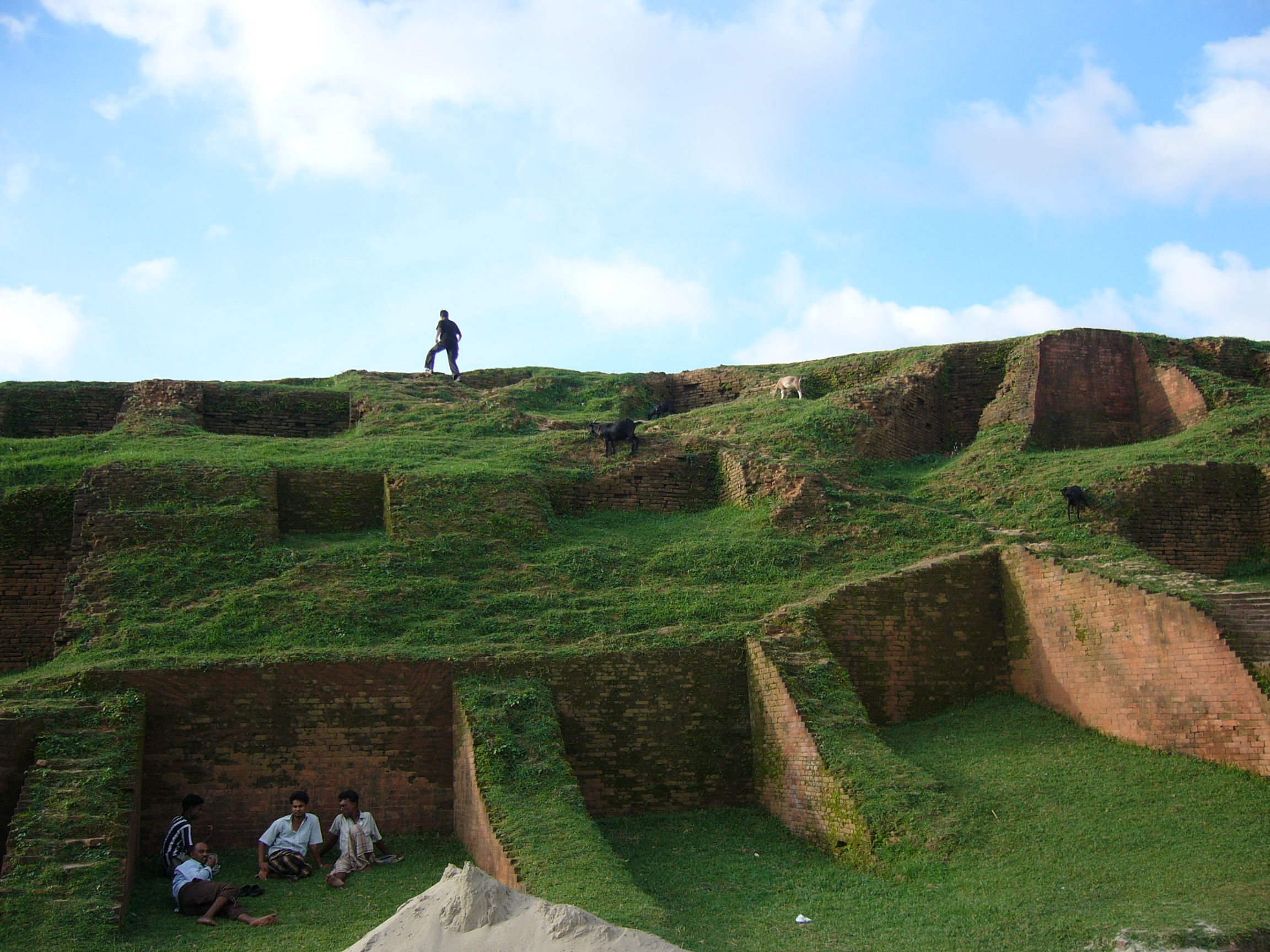
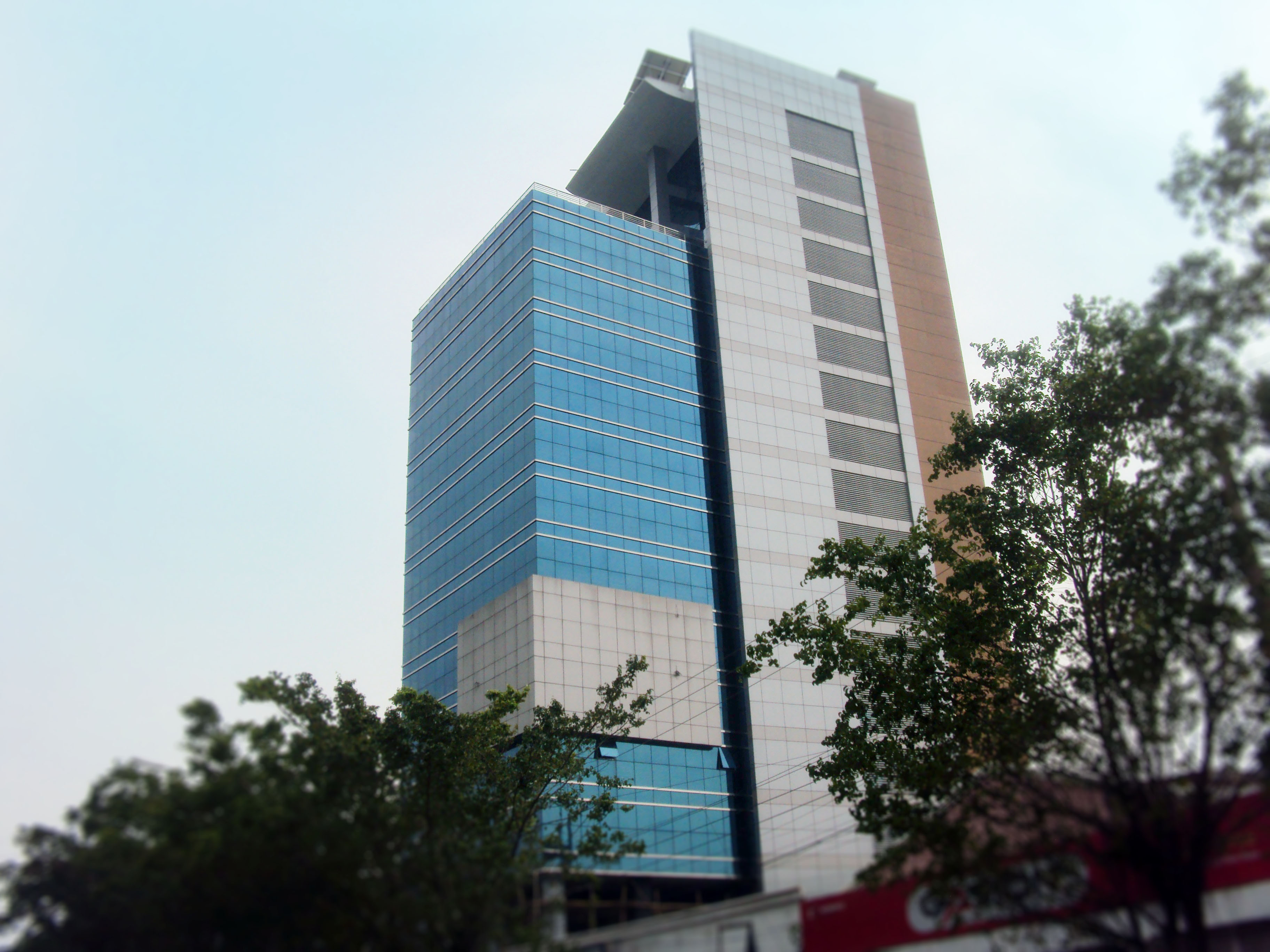
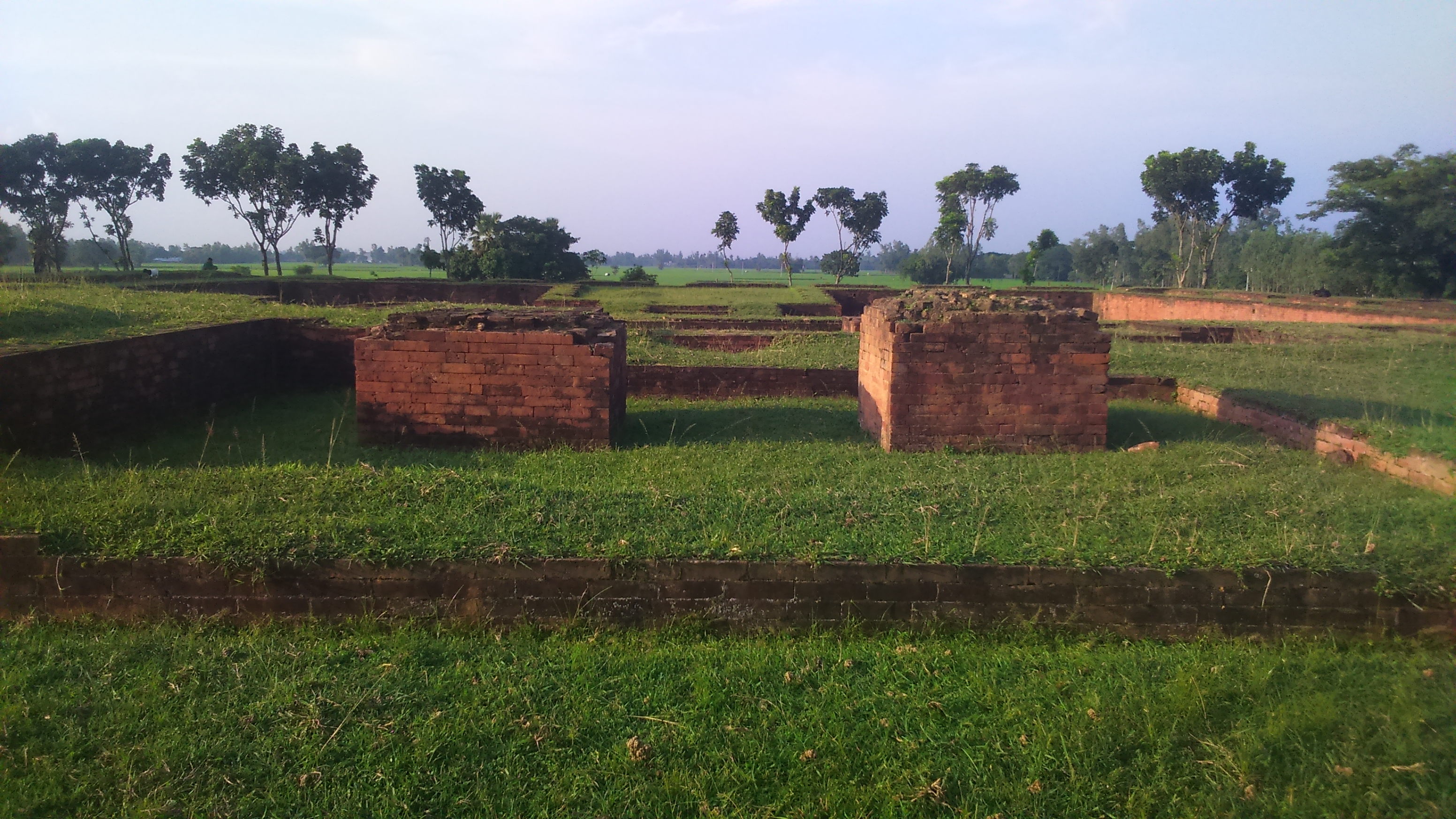
- Clockwise from top-left: Kherua Mosque in Sherpur Upazila, Street in Bogra, Sannasir Vita in Vasu Vihara, Gokul Medh in Mahasthangarh
- Interactive map of Bogura District
- Coordinates: 24.78°N 89.35°E
- Country: Bangladesh
- Division: Rajshahi Division
- Established: 1821
- Headquarters: Bogra

Government
  - Deputy Commissioner: Md Toufikur Rahman

Area
  - Total: 2,898.68 km^{2} (1,119.19 sq mi)

Population (2022)
  - Total: 3,734,297
  - Density: 1,288.28/km^{2} (3,336.62/sq mi)
- Time zone: UTC+06:00 (BST)
- Postal code: 5800
- Area code: 051
- ISO 3166 code: BD-03

Bogra District, officially Bogura District (Bengali: বগুড়া জেলা), is a district in the northern part of Bangladesh, in Rajshahi Division. Bogra is an industrial city where many small and mid-sized companies are sited. Bogra was a part of the Pundravardhana territory of ancient Bengal and the ruins of its capital can be found in northern Bogra. Bogra is named after the independent sultan of Bengal Nasiruddin Bughra Khan (1287–1291).

== History ==
=== Ancient history ===
In the ancient period, Bogra District was a part of the territory of the Pundras or Paundras, which were known by the name of Pundravardhana, one of the kingdoms of ancient Bengal region and was separated by the Karatoya River from the more easterly kingdom of Prag-Jyotisha or Kamrupa. The name Pundravardhana frequently occurs in the Mahabharata, Ramayana, and the Puranas. According to the Mahabharata and the Puranas, Vasudeva, a powerful prince of the Pundra family, ruled over Pundravardhana as far back as 1280 BC. The claims of the district to antiquity, however, mostly rely on an association with the old, fortified town that is now known as Mahasthangarh.

The district was under the rule of the Mauryas in the 4th and 3rd centuries BC. This is evidenced by the presence of pillars of Ashoka in many parts of Pundravardhana and the discovery of an ancient Brahmi inscription at Mahasthangarh in this district. Bhadra Bahu, a high monk of the Jain religion and the son of a Brahmin of Kotivarsha, was the Jain-Guru of Chandra Gupta Maurya. Ashoka was a firm believer in Buddhism and put to death and many naked sectarians, presumably the Jains, were in Pundravardhana.

The Gupta authority of the third-to-fifth centuries AD over this district is revealed by the discovery of several inscriptions of that period from Pundravardhana, which was a Bhukti under the rule of Guptas till the end of the fifth century.

Bogra was the part of Gauda Kingdom of ancient Bengal, after the rule of Guptas in Bengal. At the beginning of the seventh century, King Shashanka came upon the throne of Gauda and exercised his authority over Pundravardhana, including this district. After the death of Shashanka, the region fell under the rule of Harshavardhana (626–647). This is evident from the account of a Chinese pilgrim Xuanzang, who may have visited Pundravardhana in 640 AD.

=== Medieval period ===
By the middle of the eighth century, Gopala I assumed control over the affairs of North Bengal, establishing a royal house known as the Pala Dynasty. After Gopal was elected king, he took his seat in Pundravardhana and ruled over the region up to c. 780 and was succeeded by his son Dharmapala (c. 781–821). The Pala Kings had peaceful possession of this district until the end of their rule over Bengal in the twelfth century. Dharmapala was the son of and successor to Gopala, extended his power beyond Pundravardhana. Like his father, he was a Buddhist and founded the Buddhist Vihara at Somapura Mahavihara in Varendra, the ruins of which in Naogaon District have been discovered.

The Senas originally came from the Deccan Plateau and settled in West Bengal. Vijayasena was the first ruler of the dynasty. He defeated the last Pala king Madanapala and established his authority over the district. He was succeeded by his son Vallal Sena (1160–1178), who was in possession of the district. He built his capital at Bhabanipur Shaktipeeth, a Shakti Peeth in this district.

In the early 13th century, Pundravardhana along with the rest of the Senas fell to Turkic invaders from the Delhi Sultanate, who began governing the territory as part of Bengal. Nasiruddin Bughra Khan, for whom Bogra is named, declared his independence from the Delhi Sultanate. The Bengal Sultans built a large number of mosques in Bogra district. In the late 16th century, the region was largely governed by Afghan warlords settled on rent-free land. When the Mughals invaded, these supported the Baro-Bhuiyans, but were defeated. Bogra then became part of the Sarkar of Bazuha.

=== British Era ===
The present Bogra District was first formed in 1821 during British rule. The British Raj built the Bogura District Jail in 1883 on the Karatoa River bank. In the 1901 census, the population of the district on a reduced area was around 854,533, an increase of 11% over the past decade, and it also revealed there was no town with a population above 10,000. The famous Prafulla Chaki (1888–1908) was born in this district.

=== Post-independence ===
During the Bangladesh War of Independence of 1971, fighting occurred in the Bogra district during the Battle of Bogra between the allied troops of Mukti Bahini and Indian Army against the Pakistan Army. Captain Gias Uddin Ahmed led a group of students to attack the Pakistan Army unit in Bogra killing 23 soldiers on 29 March. The Pakistan Army killed 16 Bamacharan Mozumder family members on 4 April. The Pakistan Army killed Manmath Chandra Kundu and eight of his family members on 11 April. The Mukti Bahini raided State Bank of Pakistan in Bogura and looted 40 million Pakistani rupee which they deposited in the Mujibnagar government. Pakistan Army launched an attack on Dhunat Police Station killing one. On 23 April, Pakistan Air Force bombed Bogra City while the Pakistan Army entered the city with artillery support. 20 soldiers and 150 Bengalis were killed in the battle. Pakistan Army detained 32 from Baghra Colony and executed 25 of them at the Itkhola mass killing site. Pakistan Army killed 333 at Ghoga Bridge and Elangi Bandar. It killed 26 at Darimukanda village. On 27 April, Pakistan Army attacked Dhunat Thana and killed five police constables. The Army killed 157 at Baman village in Nandigram upazila. The Army killed three at Sonatala Rail Station Bazar.

Pakistan Army killed 100 Kallani village in Sherpur Upazila and three in Kalerpara union. Mukti Bahini killed in three soldiers, one police officer, and number of personnel of the Razakar unit in a battle on 16 August. The Army killed three at Sonatala Bandar and the Mukti Bahini destroyed a bridge at Sariakandi. A mine killed six soldiers of Pakistan Army near the bridge. Mukti Bahini killed six constables of Pakistan Police in Fulbarighat. The Army killed and buried 17 near Dhunat Police Station. On 19 September a battle took place between the Mukti Bahini and Pakistan Army at Tajurpara village. Pakistan Army raided Narchi and Ganakpara villages killing local villagers. On 11 November, Pakistan Army killed 14 and buried them in Bibirpukur of Shajahanpur Upazila. The Pakistan Army killed two Mukti Bahini personnel on 28 November. Mukti Bahini attacked Sariakandi Police Station killing 18 soldiers and Razakar personnel while taking three casualties. A battle in Dhunat resulted in the death of five.

Bogra District holds five mass graves located at Padmapukur (near Talore-Dhupchanchia Road), Bibirpukur (Shajahanpur), Baman Gram (Nandigram), Hariakandi (Sonatala), and near Dhunat Police Station. A mass killing site exists in Baghra Colony, Sherpur. Memorial monuments have been erected at Kahaloo High School, Adamdighi cremation site, and Dhunat.

In 2018, the government of Bangladesh changed the spelling of the district's name from Bogra to Bogura.

== Geography and climate ==
=== Formation of land ===
The area consisting of Sariakandi Upazila, Gabtali Upazila, Sonatala Upazila, and the majority of Dhunat is called the eastern alluvial tract. It is fertilized by silt from floodwaters. The eastern alluvion is one of the most fertile and prosperous areas in Bogra; jute, aman paddy, sugarcane and pulses are locally grown. Sometimes, as many as three cycles of crops are grown on one field in a year with little diminution in productivity.

The western portion of the district is well-wooded with dense, shrub jungles in Upazilas of Sherpur and in parts of Sibganj, which has a large portion of cultivable wasteland. This part of the district is slightly higher than the eastern parts and is mostly above flood level. The soil of this part is generally suited to the growth of paddy. Adamdighi is well known for the fine qualities of rice, which is also grown to some extent in the Shibganj Upazila.

The tract to the east of the Karatoya is a part of the valley of the Brahmaputra River; it is generally low-lying and intersected by numerous khals (canals, shallow swamps and marshes). It is subject to yearly inundation from the overflow of the Brahmaputra and gets a rich deposit of silt. There is very little jungle and almost the entire area is under cultivation.

=== Rivers ===
There are many rivers in the Bogra District. The Karatoya is the central divider of the water channel in the district. The other rivers may be classified into the eastern and western systems. Some of the major rivers in this district are:

- The Bangali
- The Karatoya
- The Jamuna
- The Nagar
- The Tulshiganga
- The Isamoti
- The Vodraboti River at Sahajahanpur

=== Climate ===
The district has a humid subtropical climate. The average annual rainfall in this part of the country varies from 1400 mm to 1600 mm.

Climate data for Bogra
Month	Jan	Feb	Mar	Apr	May	Jun	Jul	Aug	Sep	Oct	Nov	Dec	Year
Mean daily maximum °C (°F)	23.0 (73.4)	27.3 (81.1)	32.6 (90.7)	35.1 (95.2)	33.5 (92.3)	32.0 (89.6)	31.4 (88.5)	31.4 (88.5)	31.5 (88.7)	31.0 (87.8)	28.9 (84.0)	25.5 (77.9)	30.3 (86.5)
Daily mean °C (°F)	16.4 (61.5)	20.0 (68.0)	25.2 (77.4)	28.8 (83.8)	28.8 (83.8)	28.7 (83.7)	28.7 (83.7)	28.7 (83.7)	28.5 (83.3)	27.1 (80.8)	23.2 (73.8)	19.0 (66.2)	25.3 (77.5)
Mean daily minimum °C (°F)	9.8 (49.6)	12.7 (54.9)	17.9 (64.2)	22.5 (72.5)	24.1 (75.4)	25.5 (77.9)	26.1 (79.0)	26.1 (79.0)	25.6 (78.1)	23.2 (73.8)	17.6 (63.7)	12.6 (54.7)	20.3 (68.6)
Average precipitation mm (inches)	9 (0.4)	13 (0.5)	21 (0.8)	61 (2.4)	210 (8.3)	326 (12.8)	396 (15.6)	303 (11.9)	257 (10.1)	145 (5.7)	15 (0.6)	6 (0.2)	1,762 (69.3)
Average relative humidity (%)	44	34	36	45	63	74	74	74	72	68	50	46	57
Source: National newspapers

== Demographics ==
Historical population
Year	Pop.	±% p.a.
1974	1,723,262	—
1981	2,108,622	+2.93%
1991	2,669,287	+2.39%
2001	3,013,056	+1.22%
2011	3,400,874	+1.22%
2022	3,734,297	+0.85%

According to the 2022 Census of Bangladesh, Bogra District has 1,025,200 households and a population of 3,734,297 with an average 3.58 people per household. Among the population, 612,661 (16.41%) inhabitants are under 10 years of age. The population density is 1,288 people per km^{2}. Bogra District has a literacy rate (age 7 and over) was 72.55%, compared to the national average of 74.80%, and a sex ratio of 98.52 males per 100 females. Approximately, 25.74% (961,354) of the population live in urban areas. The ethnic population was 5,994.

Religion in Bogra District (2022)
Religion	Percent
Islam	94.16%
Hinduism	5.80%
Other or not stated	0.04%

Religion in present-day Bogra District
Religion	1941 (Note: Bogra district excluding thanas of Joypurhat, Khetlal and Panchbibi)		1981		1991		2001		2011		2022	
Religion	Pop.	%	Pop.	%	Pop.	%	Pop.	%	Pop.	%	Pop.	%
Islam	892,627	86.21%	1,946,056	92.29%	2,472,019	92.61%	2,819,432	93.57%	3,192,728	93.88%	3,516,157	94.16%
Hinduism	139,868	13.51%	160,495	7.61%	187,973	7.04%	191,528	6.36%	205,333	6.04%	216,657	5.80%
Others (Note: Including Jainism, Buddhism, Zoroastrianism, Judaism, Ad-Dharmis, or not stated)	2,968	0.29%	2,071	0.10%	9,295	0.35%	2,096	0.07%	2,813	0.08%	1,483	0.04%
Total Population	1,035,463	100%	2,108,622	100%	2,669,287	100%	3,013,056	100%	3,400,874	100%	3,734,297	100%

The main language of the district is Bengali; a Northern Bengali dialect is commonly used.

== Administration ==
- Administrator of Zila Porishod: Mokbul Hossain
- Deputy Commissioner (DC): Md. Saiful Islam

=== Upazilas ===
Bogra District upazila geocode map

Bogra has 13 upazilas (subdistricts):

- Adamdighi
- Bogra Sadar
- Sherpur
- Dhunat
- Dhupchanchia
- Gabtali
- Kahaloo
- Nandigram
- Shajahanpur
- Sariakandi
- Shibganj
- Sonatala
- Mokamtola

== Education ==
- University of Bogura
- Bogura Zilla School
- Bogura Cantonment Public School and College
- Bogra Polytechnic Institute
- Government Azizul Haque College
- Government Mustafabia Alia Madrasha
- Shaheed Ziaur Rahman Medical College
- Bogra Govt. College
- Govt. Shah-Sultan College
- Bogra Govt. Mujibur Rahman Mahila College
- Kahaloo University College
- Bogra Govt. Girls' High School
- Bogra Armed Police Battalion Public School And college
- Police Lines School and College, Bogra
- BIAM Model School and College, Bogura
- Pundra University of Science & Technology
- International Hope School, Bogura Branch, Sheujgari, Bogura
- Millennium Scholstic School & College, Jahangirabad Bogra

== Notable residents ==
- Mohammad Ali Bogra (1909–1963), Prime Minister of Pakistan (1953–1955)
- Prafulla Chaki (1888–1908), revolutionary and nationalist
- Mafiz Ali Chowdhury (1919–1994), cabinet minister
- Tarun Majumdar (1931–2022), Indian Bengali film director
- M. R. Akhtar Mukul (1929–2004), author and journalist

== See also ==
- Majhira Cantonment
- Jahangirabad Cantonment
- Districts of Bangladesh
- Divisions of Bangladesh
- Upazila
- Administrative geography of Bangladesh
