= Shibganj Upazila =

Shibganj Upazila may refer to:

- Shibganj Upazila, Bogura
- Shibganj Upazila, Nawabganj
