= Gabtali Upazila =

Gabtali গাবতলী
- Upazila
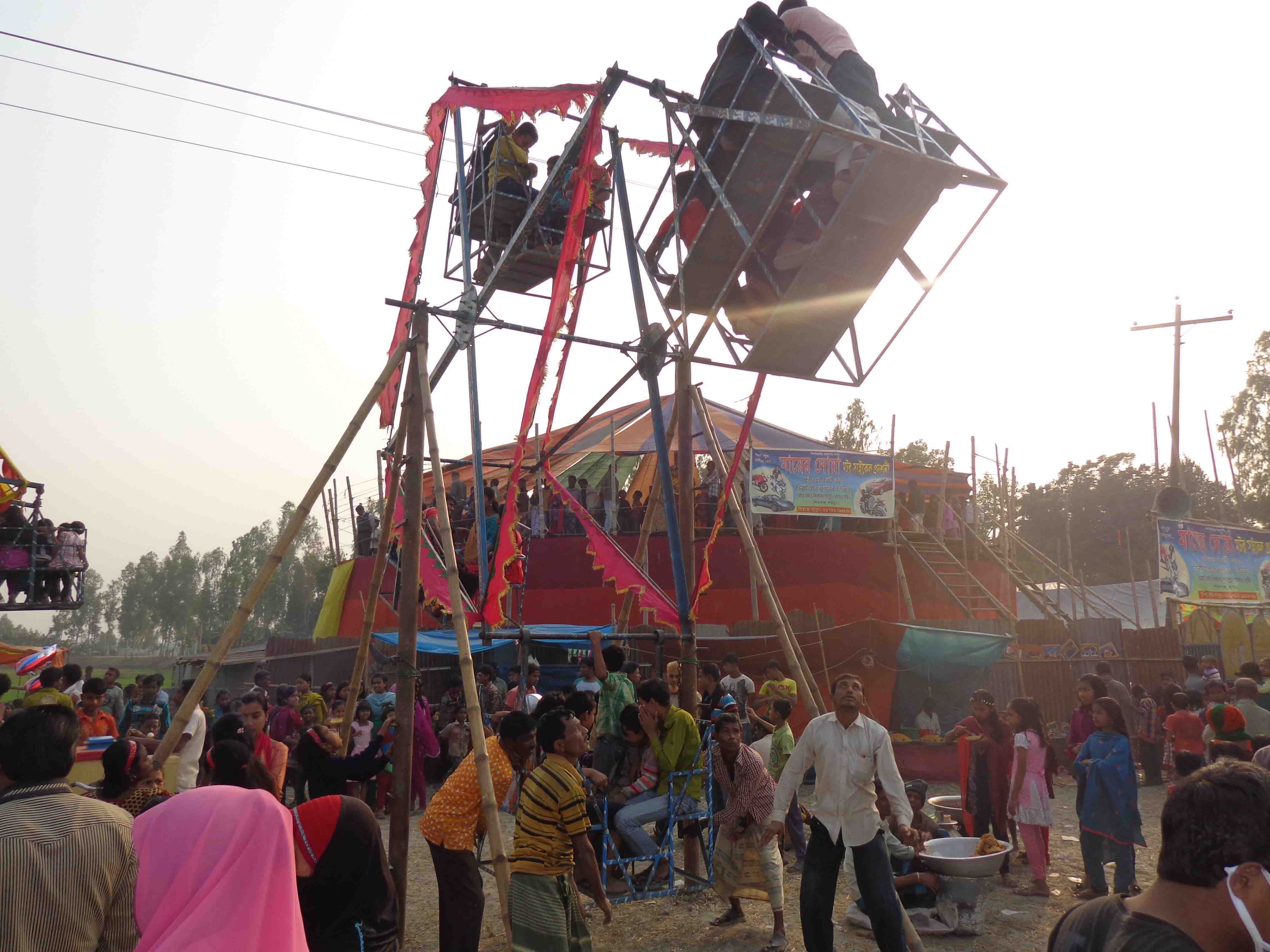
- Poradoho Mela in Gabtali

- Coordinates: 24°53′N 89°27′E
- Country: Bangladesh
- Division: Rajshahi
- District: Bogra
- Thana: 1914
- Upazila: 1983
- Headquarters: Gabtali

Government
  - MP (Bogra-7): Rezaul Karim Bablu
  - Upazila chairman: Rofi Nawas Khan Robin

Area
  - Total: 239.61 km^{2} (92.51 sq mi)

Population (2022)
  - Total: 344,902
  - Density: 1,439.4/km^{2} (3,728.1/sq mi)
- Time zone: UTC+6 (BST)
- Postal code: 5820
- Area code: 051
- Website: gabtali.bogra.gov.bd

Gabtali Upazila mauza geocode map

Gabtali (Bengali: গাবতলী, romanized: Gabtoli) is an upazila of the Bogra District, located in Bangladesh's Rajshahi Division. It is named after its administrative centre, the town of Gabtali and is best known as the home upazila of Ziaur Rahman, the late President of Bangladesh. Gabtali town is 7 km north of Bogra.

== Etymology ==
Local proverb

গাছের গাব লায়ের তলী
Gachher gab, laayer toli
The tree's gaub, the boat's underside
এ্যাই লিয়া গাবতলী
Ei liya Gabtoli
Together that makes Gabtali

—

There are numerous theories on how Gabtali got its name. According to Najmul Huda, the history of the naming of this place is unknown and possible theories are mere folklore.

In the Gabtali Fables by Mubarak Ali Akhand, he mentions an incident which took place in circa 1932 when he was 10–12 years old. It was the day of Eid and the Dakshinpara villagers, including Akhand, set off to offer prayers in the Madhyapara eidgah. In the middle of the village, to the left of the road, stood an enormous shaky Gaub tree. The local worshippers there informed them that the village was named after this Gaub tree. The area is known to have many Gaub trees, and historically in northwestern Gabtali, there were forests and dense vegetation which the locals called ‘Ara’. Gaub trees were abundant in the Ara forests, and were said to have been born naturally. In the early 1900s, large jute-laden boats (known as lao in the local dialect) drove from the low lands at the rear of Gabtali Sadar across many towns. The wood from the underside of the boat, known in Bengali as toli, could be found across the Gabtoli area. Many people found the underside wood digging the wells, and this wood continues to be found when the soil is dug. Some believe that this is probably also a factor as to why Gabtoli is an impoverished area.

== Administrative area ==
This upazila has 1 municipality (Gabatli municipality), 12 unions, 104 mauzas and 211 villages, one police station (Gabatli Model Thana) and one police outpost (Bagbari). It falls under Bogra-7 parliamentary constituency.

== History ==
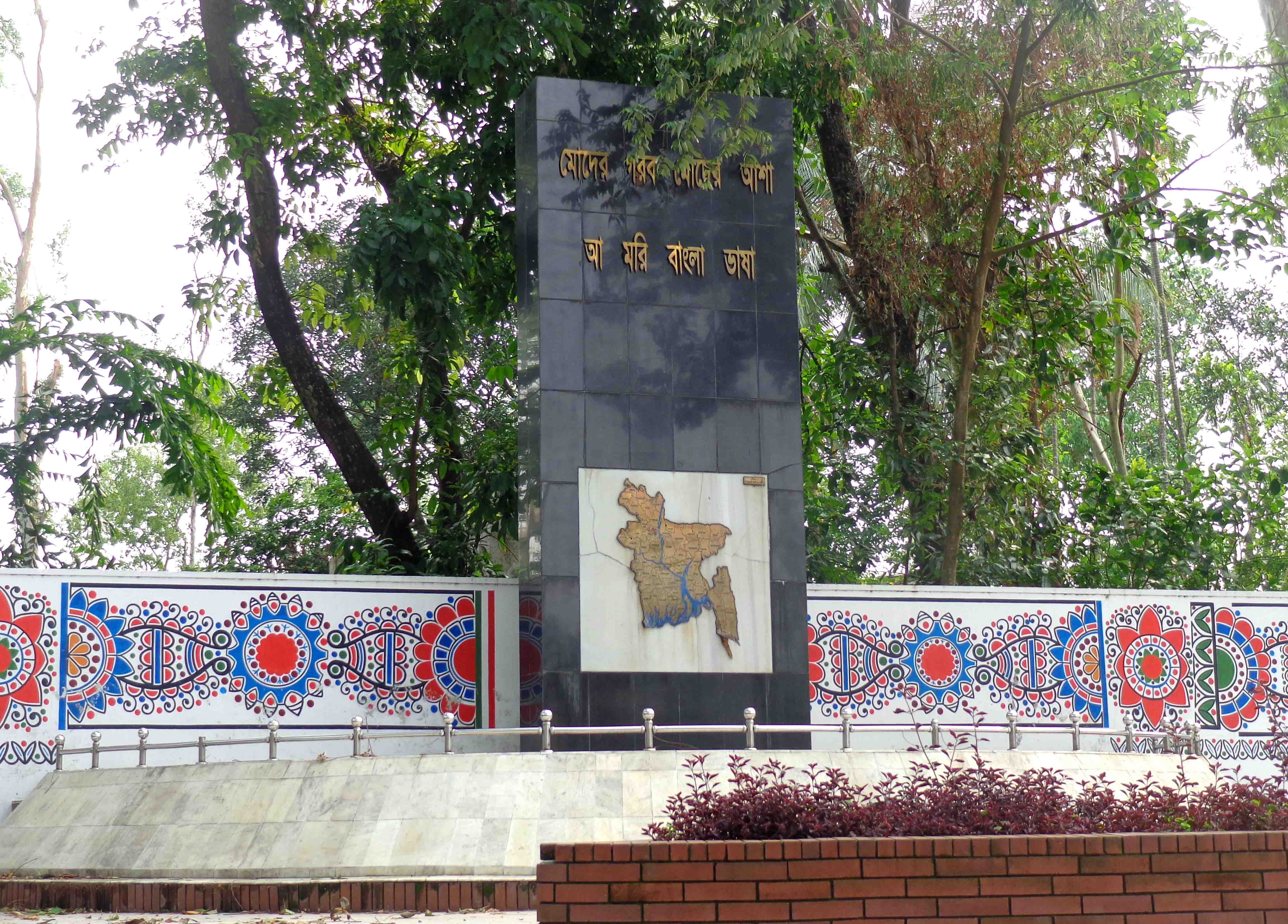
A Shaheed Minar (Martyr's Monument) in Gabtali, commemorating those killed in the 1971 war.

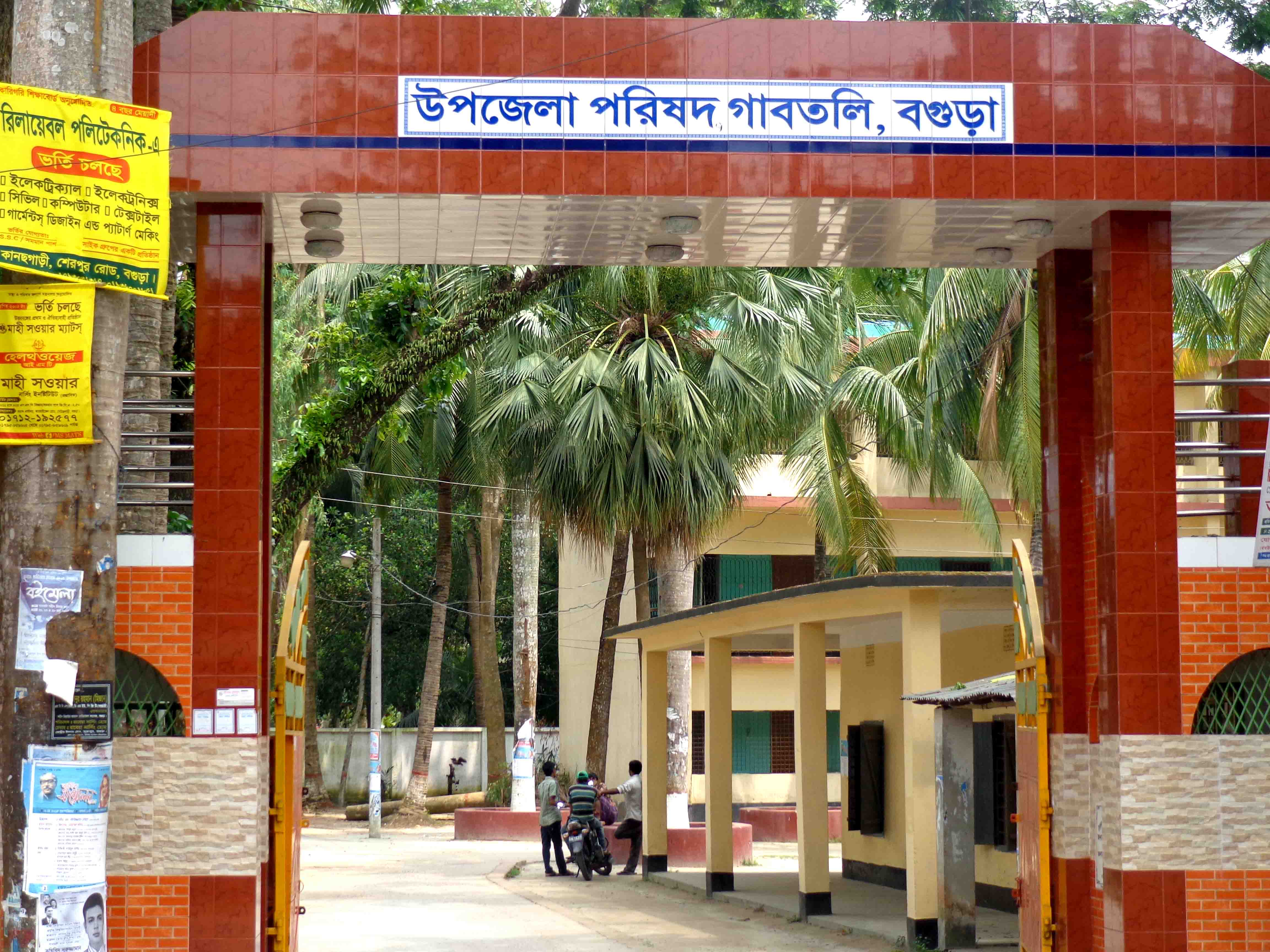
The Gabtali Upazila council premises.

Modern-day Gabtali Upazila was historically known as a stronghold for Muslim revivalist campaigns such as the 19th-century Tariqah-i-Muhammadiya movement and the early 20th-century Khilafat Movement. In 1914, Gabtali was established as a thana.

During the Bangladesh Liberation War of 1971, the Pakistan Army set up a military camp in Gabtali. On November 15, a commander of the Bengali freedom fighters was killed during a brawl between the two sides in the village of Daripara in Balia Dighi Union. Civilians were also killed when the Pakistani army attempted to take control of Jaybhoga's Railway Bridge. The army retreated on December 13, murdering two civilians on the way, leading to another brawl with freedom fighters killing a Pakistani soldier. The final encounter was when four soldiers were caught hiding behind bushes in Kshudraperi on December 16. This encounter resulted in the deaths of all four soldiers and a freedom fighter.

In 1983, the Gabtali thana was upgraded to an upazila (sub-district).

== Geography ==
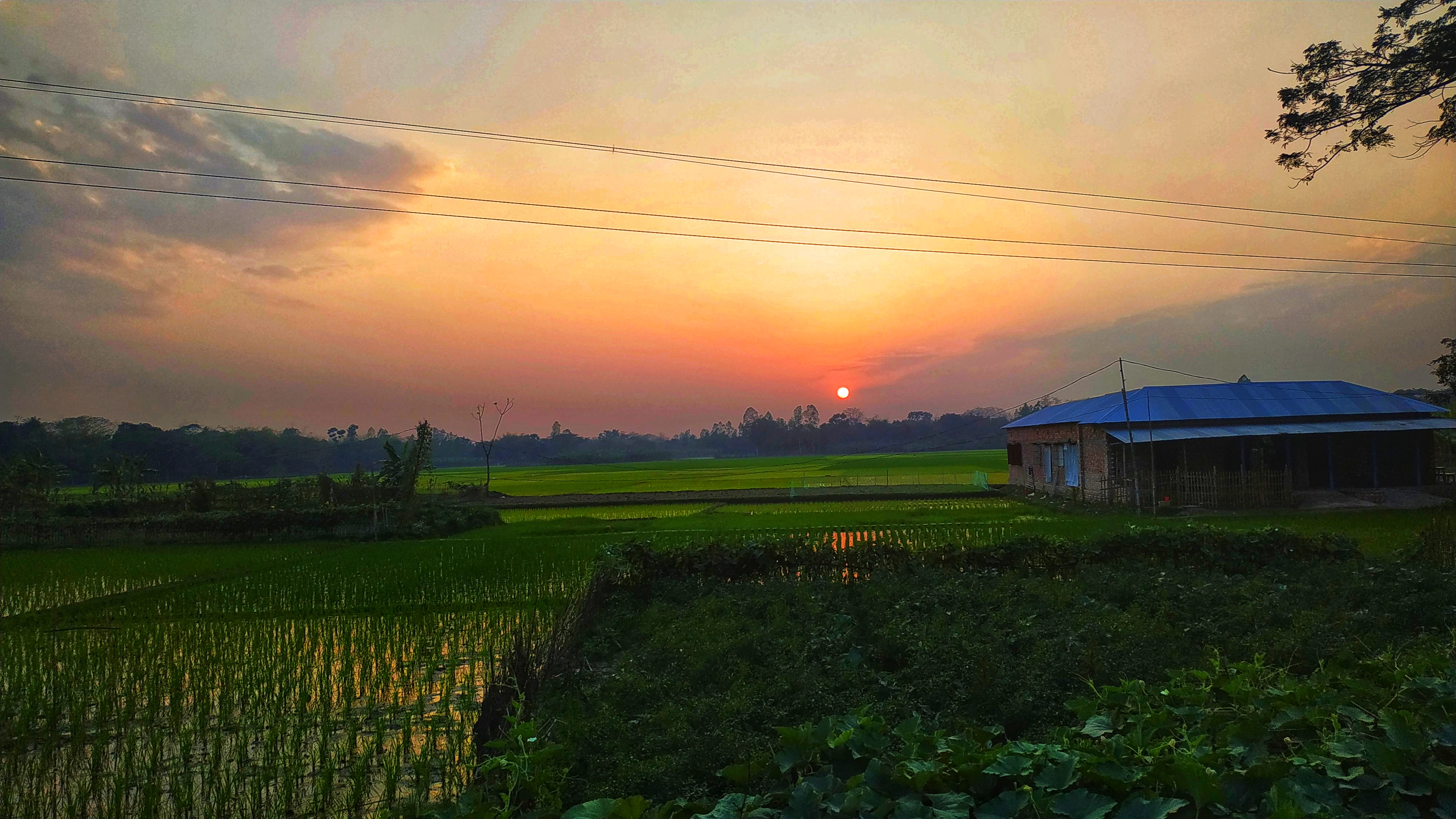
Sunset in the village of Kagail.

Gabtali Upazila has a total area of 239.61 square kilometres (92.51 sq mi). It borders Shibganj Upazila to the north, Sonatala Upazila to the north and east, Sariakandi Upazila to the east, Dhunat Upazila to the south, and Shajahanpur and Bogra Sadar upazilas to the west.

== Demographics ==
Historical population
Year	Pop. (000)	±%
1981	229	—
1991	266	+16.2%
2001	290	+9.0%
2011	320	+10.3%
2022	345	+7.8%
Source: Bangladesh Bureau of Statistics

Religions in Gabtali Upazila (2022)
Religion	Percent
Islam	94.16%
Hinduism	5.83%

According to the 2022 Bangladeshi census, Gabtali Upazila had 93,282 households and a population of 344,902. 8.88% of the population were under 5 years of age. Gabtali had a literacy rate (age 7 and over) of 69.48%: 71.72% for males and 67.33% for females, and a sex ratio of 96.87 males for every 100 females. 45,572 (13.21%) lived in urban areas.

According to the 2011 Census of Bangladesh, Gabtali Upazila had 83,411 households and a population of 319,588. 67,581 (21.15%) were under 10 years of age. Gabtali had a literacy rate (age 7 and over) of 46.58%, compared to the national average of 51.8%, and a sex ratio of 1008 females per 1000 males. 21,455 (6.71%) lived in urban areas.

== Administration ==
Gabtali Upazila is divided into Gabtali Municipality and 12 union parishads: Balia Dighi, Dakshinpara, Durgahata, Gabtali, Kagail, Mahishaban, Naruamala, Nasipur, Nepaltali, Rameshwarpur, Sonarai and Shunkhanpukur. The union parishads are subdivided into 103 mauzas and 211 villages.

Gabtali Municipality is subdivided into 9 wards and 21 mahallas.

== Transport ==
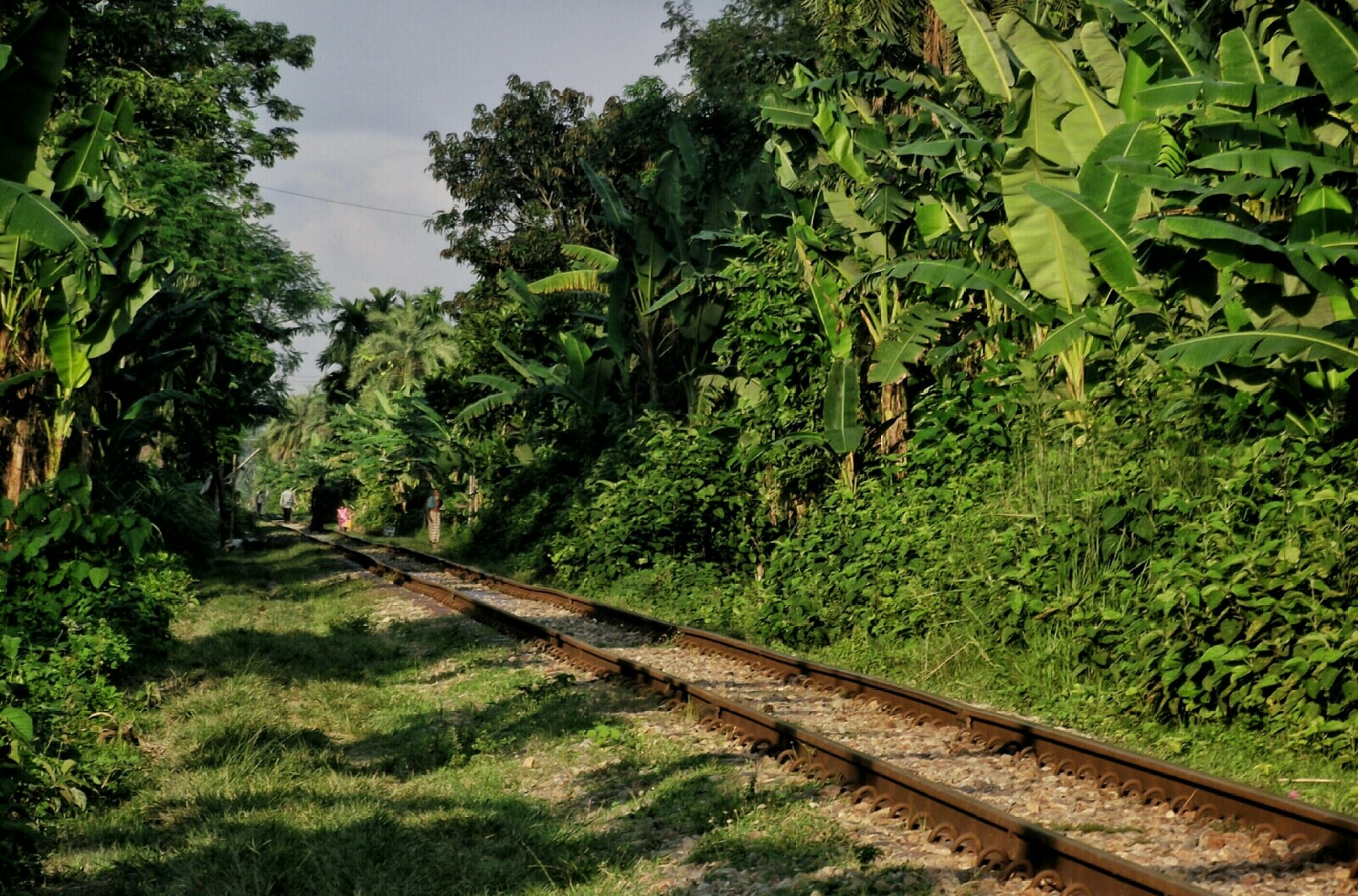
Railroad tracks at Chokbochai village in Gabtoli union

Railway stations Gabtali and Sukanpukur are on the branch line connecting Santahar and Kaunia. In July 2014 they were served by six or eight intercity and six mail trains a day.

== Education ==
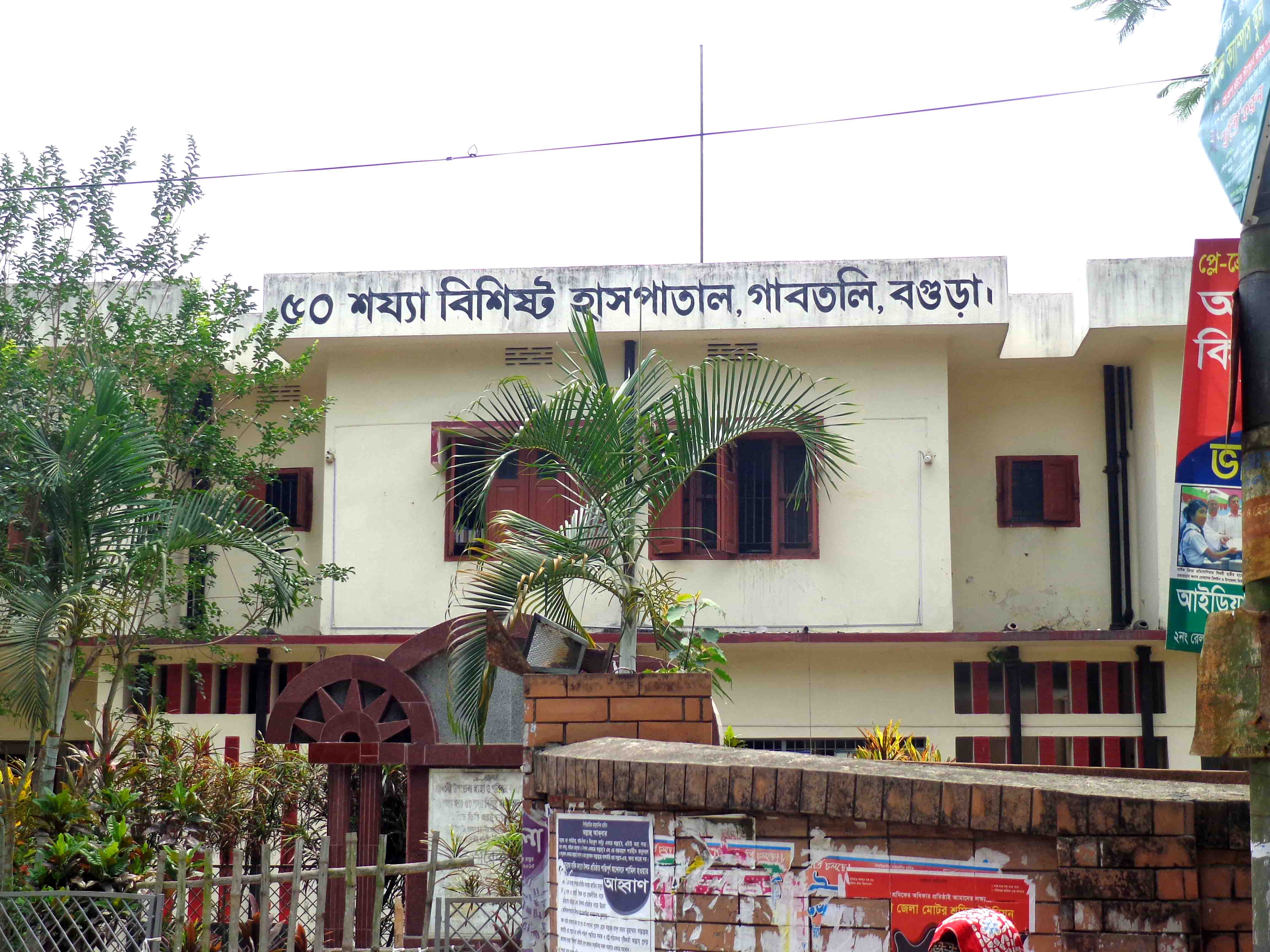
The Gabtali Hospital.

There are nine colleges in the upazila. Gabtali Government College is the only public one. Private colleges include Durgahatta Degree College, Shahid Zia Degree College, Taranir Hat Degree College, and Taslim Uddin Tarafder Degree College. Syed Ahmmed College in Sukhan Pukur is the only honors level college in the upazila.

The madrasa education system includes three fazil madrasas. The Darul Hadith Rahmaniyyah in Sondabari dates back to the early 1700s.

== Economy and tourism ==
Out of Gabtali's 455 mosques, the historic mosque of Madar Shah Ghazi in Bagbari is quite notable. The area is quite notable for Hadudu, having historically being national champions in the seventies. In Poradaha Battla, Golabari, Mahishaban, there is the annual historic Poradoho fish fair (mela).

== Notable people ==
- Ziaur Rahman, President of Bangladesh (1977–1981), spent part of his childhood in Bagbari village.
- Tarique Rahman, politician; current acting chairman of Bangladesh Nationalist Party (BNP).
- Arafat Rahman, cause célèbre.

== See also ==
- Upazilas of Bangladesh
- Districts of Bangladesh
- Divisions of Bangladesh
