= Bogra Sadar Upazila =

Bogura Sadar বগুড়া সদর
- Upazila
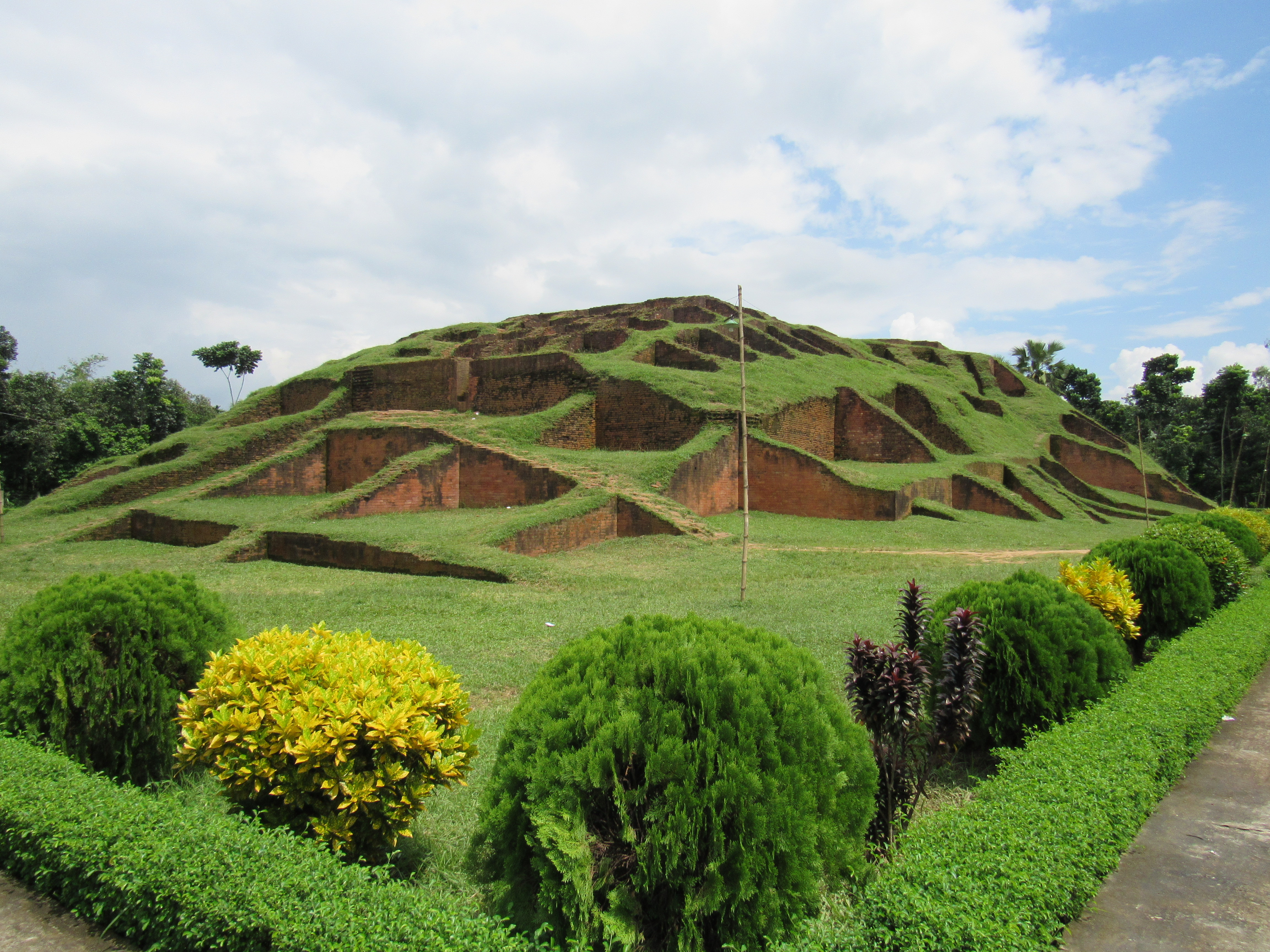
- Gokul Medh, part of Mahasthangarh

- Coordinates: 24°51′N 89°22′E
- Country: Bangladesh
- Division: Rajshahi
- District: Bogra
- Seat: Bogra

Area
  - Total: 176.58 km^{2} (68.18 sq mi)

Population (2022)
  - Total: 657,790
  - Density: 3,725.2/km^{2} (9,648.1/sq mi)
- Time zone: UTC+6 (BST)
- Postal code: 5800
- Area code: 051
- Website: sadar.bogra.gov.bd(in Bengali)

Bogra Sadar Upazila mauza geocode map

Bogra Sadar Upazila officially Bogura Sadar Upazila (Bengali: বগুড়া সদর উপজেলা) is an upazila of Bogra District in Rajshahi Division, Bangladesh. Bogra Thana was established in 1821 and was converted into an upazila in 1983. The upazila takes its name from the district and the Bengali word sadar (headquarters). It is the subdistrict where the district headquarters, Bogra town, is located.

== Geography ==
Bogra Sadar Upazila has a total area of 176.58 square kilometres (68.18 sq mi). It borders Shibganj Upazila to the north, Gabtali Upazila to the east, Shajahanpur Upazila to the south, and Kahaloo Upazila to the west. The Karatoya River flows south through the upazila.

== Demographics ==
Historical population
Year	Pop. (000)	±%
1981	454	—
1991	589	+29.7%
2001	694	+17.8%
2011	555	−20.0%
2022	658	+18.6%
2011 population declined because upazila boundaries were redrawn to create Shajahanpur Upazila; Source: Bangladesh Bureau of Statistics

Religions in Bogra Sadar Upazila (2022)
Religion	Percent
Islam	94.35%
Hinduism	5.56%
Other or not stated	0.09%

According to the 2022 Bangladeshi census, Bogura Sadar Upazila had 172,009 households and a population of 657,790. 7.67% of the population were under 5 years of age. Bogura Sadar had a literacy rate (age 7 and over) of 83.63%: 85.62% for males and 81.57% for females, and a sex ratio of 103.46 males for every 100 females. 446,281 (67.85%) lived in urban areas.

According to the 2011 Census of Bangladesh, Bogra Sadar Upazila had 131,862 households and a population of 555,014. 101,626 (18.31%) were under 10 years of age. Bogra Sadar had a literacy rate (age 7 and over) of 65.70%, compared to the national average of 51.8%, and a sex ratio of 927 females per 1000 males. 350,397 (63.13%) lived in urban areas.

The boundaries of the upazila were redrawn in 2003 to create a new upazila, Shajahanpur. The combined population of the two in 2011 was 844,818, a 21.7% increase from 2001.

== Administration ==
Bogra Sadar Upazila is divided into 11 union parishads: Erulia, Fapore, Gokul, Lahiri Para, Namuja, Nishindara, Noongola, Rajapur, Sekherkola, Shabgram, and Shakharia. The union parishads are subdivided into 92 mauzas and 122 villages.

== Education ==
There are 13 colleges in the upazila, most located in Bogra town. Those outside the town include Adarsha Mohabiddyalaya in Puran Bogra, Jahidur Rahman Women's College in Erulia, Govt. Shah Sultan College, Namuza Degree College in Namuja, and Noon Gola Degree College.

== See also ==
- Bogra town
- Upazilas of Bangladesh
- Districts of Bangladesh
- Divisions of Bangladesh
- Bogra Cantonment
- Administrative geography of Bangladesh
