= Adamdighi Upazila =

Adamdighi আদমদিঘী
- Upazila
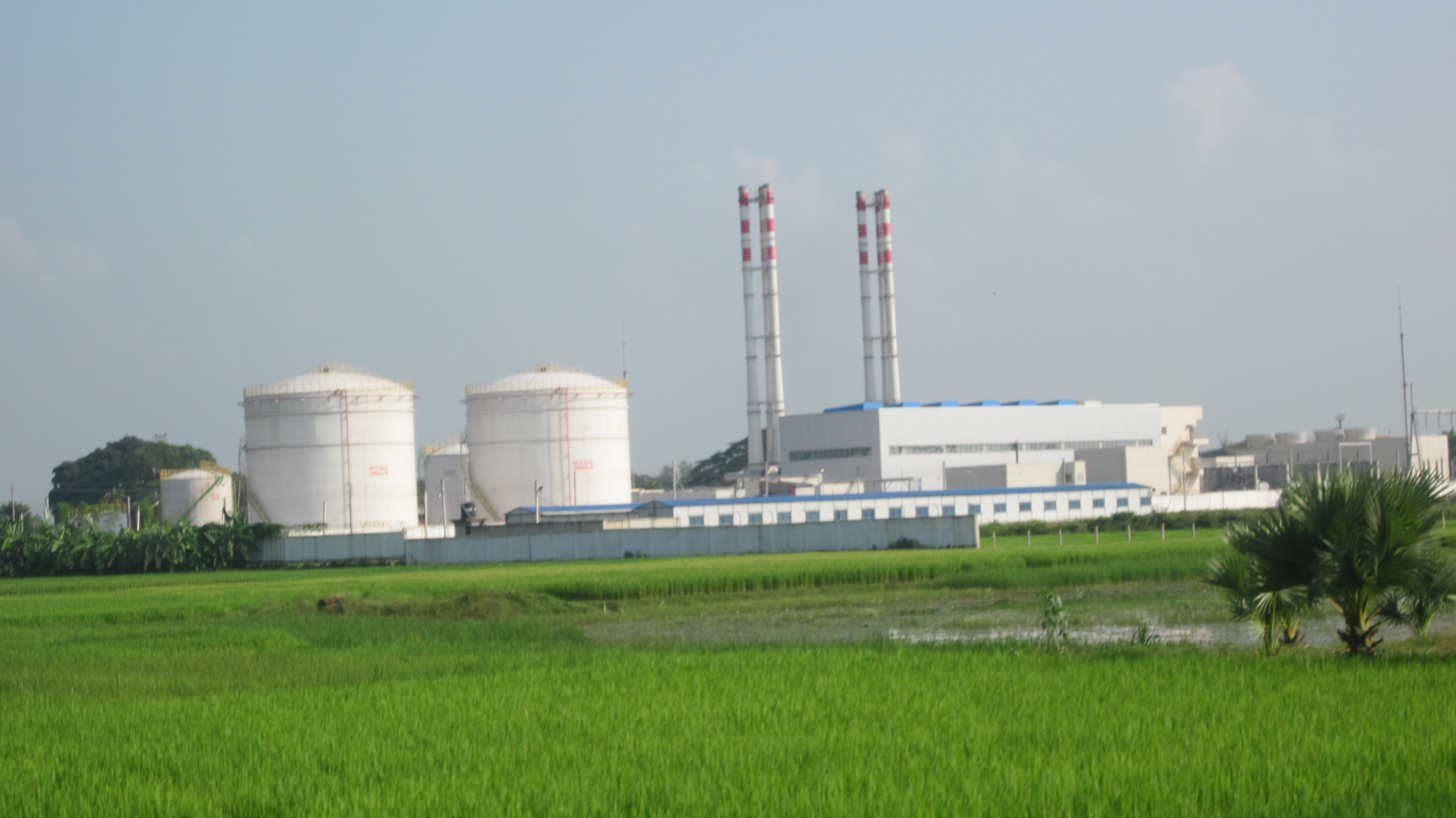
- Shantahar Peaking Power Plant

- Coordinates: 24°49′N 89°2′E
- Country: Bangladesh
- Division: Rajshahi
- District: Bogra

Area
  - Total: 168.83 km^{2} (65.19 sq mi)

Population (2022)
  - Total: 206,797
  - Density: 1,224.9/km^{2} (3,172.4/sq mi)
- Time zone: UTC+6 (BST)
- Postal code: 5890
- Website: adamdighi.bogra.gov.bd(in Bengali)

Adamdighi Upazila mauza geocode map

Adamdighi Upazila (Bengali: আদমদিঘী উপজেলা) is an upazila of Bogra District in the Division of Rajshahi, Bangladesh. Adamdighi Thana was established in 1821 and was converted into an upazila in 1983. It is named after its administrative center, the town of Adamdighi. Local legend has it that its name came from a Muslim saint, Baba Adam, who visited and dug a dighi (tank) for water storage.

== Geography ==
Adamdighi Upazila has a total area of 168.83 square kilometres (65.19 sq mi). It is the westernmost upazila of Bogra District. It borders Joypurhat District to the north, Dhupchanchia Upazila to the north and east, Kahaloo and Nandigram upazilas to the east, and Naogaon District to the south and west.

== Demographics ==
Historical population
Year	Pop. (000)	±%
1981	137	—
1991	170	+24.1%
2001	187	+10.0%
2011	195	+4.3%
2022	207	+6.2%
Source: Bangladesh Bureau of Statistics

Religions in Adamdighi Upazila (2022)
Religion	Percent
Islam	91.78%
Hinduism	8.20%
Other or not stated	0.02%

According to the 2022 Bangladeshi census, Adamdighi Upazila had 57,199 households and a population of 206,797. 7.61% of the population were under 5 years of age. Adamdighi had a literacy rate (age 7 and over) of 76.73%: 79.33% for males and 74.28% for females, and a sex ratio of 94.75 males for every 100 females. 51,925 (25.11%) lived in urban areas.

According to the 2011 Census of Bangladesh, Adamdighi Upazila had 49,600 households and a population of 195,186. 36,157 (18.52%) were under 10 years of age. Adamdighi had a literacy rate (age 7 and over) of 54.57%, compared to the national average of 51.8%, and a sex ratio of 1005 females per 1000 males. 39,946 (20.47%) lived in urban areas.

== Points of interest ==
- Kaboi Rajbari (palace)
- Kalachand Temple

== Administration ==
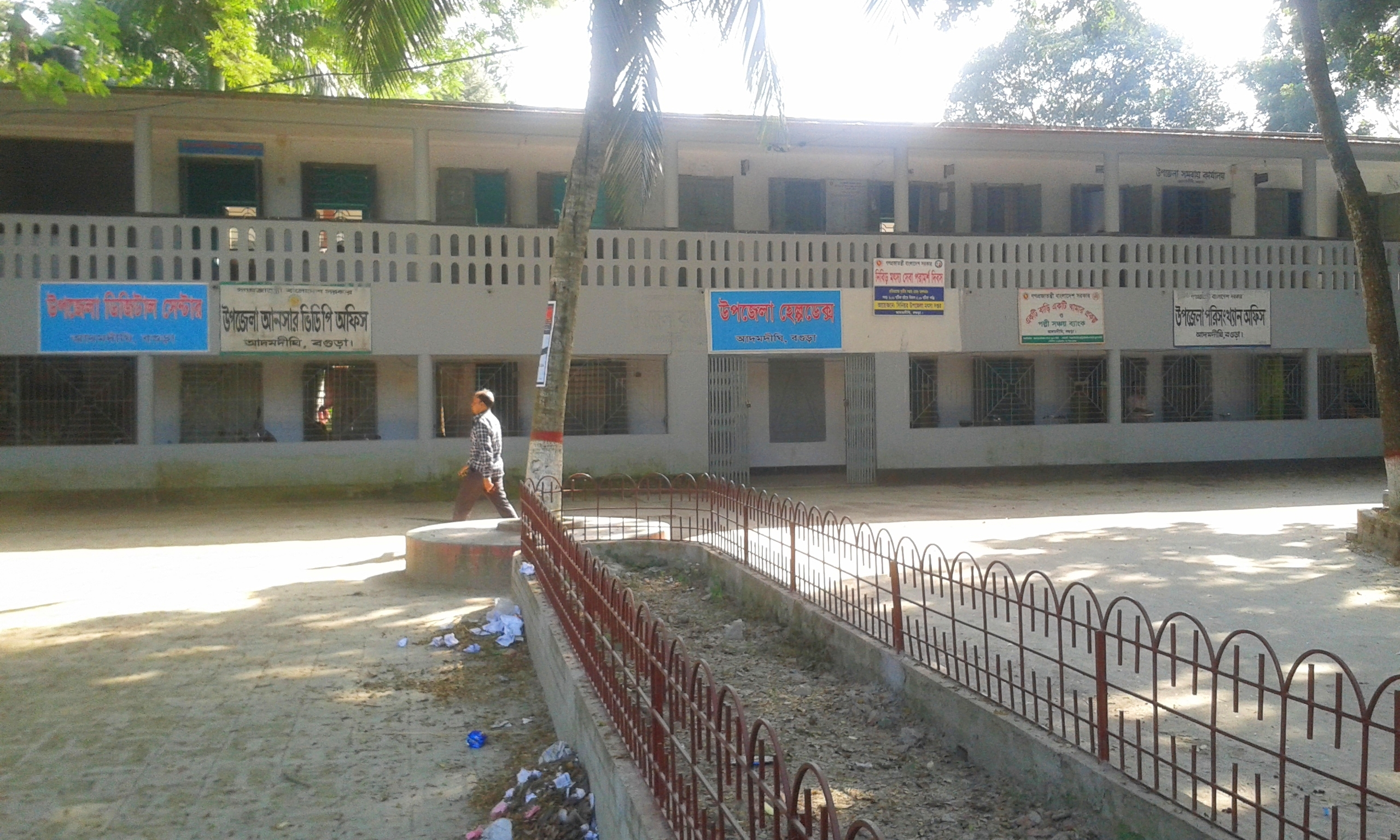
Adomdighi Upazila Office

Adamdighi Upazila is divided into Santahar Municipality and six union parishads: Adamdighi Sadar, Chapapur, Chhatiangram, Kundugram, Nashratpur, and Santahar. The union parishads are subdivided into 100 mauzas and 179 villages.

Santahar Municipality is subdivided into 9 wards and 35 mahallas.

== Transport ==
Santahar railway station is a rail junction between the main line connecting Darshana and Chilahati and the branch line connecting Santahar and Kaunia. In July 2014 between 15 and 20 intercity and 7 mail trains a day departed from Santahar.

Rail station Chhatiangram is on the main line connecting Darshana and Chilahati. In July 2014 it was served by between 10 and 14 intercity and 4 mail trains a day.

Rail stations Adamdighi and Nashratpur are on the branch line connecting Santahar and Kaunia. In July 2014 they were served by six or eight intercity and six mail trains a day.

== Education ==
There are seven colleges in the upazila. Santahar Government College is the only public one. Private colleges include Adamdighi Rahim Uddin Degree College, Nasratpur Degree College, and Shahid Ahsanul Haque Degree College.

The madrasa education system includes one fazil madrasa.

== Notable residents ==
- Kasim Uddin Ahmed, member of parliament, served as the upazila Awami League president for 44 years.
- Rani Bhabani, zamindar, was born at Chhatiangram in 1716.
- SM Farooq, member of parliament, was born at Kamargari in 1951.
- Khan Muhammad Saifullah Al Mehdi (born 1988), member of Parliament

== See also ==
- Upazilas of Bangladesh
- Districts of Bangladesh
- Divisions of Bangladesh
