= Dhupchanchia Upazila =

Dhupchanchia দুপচাঁচিয়া
- Upazila
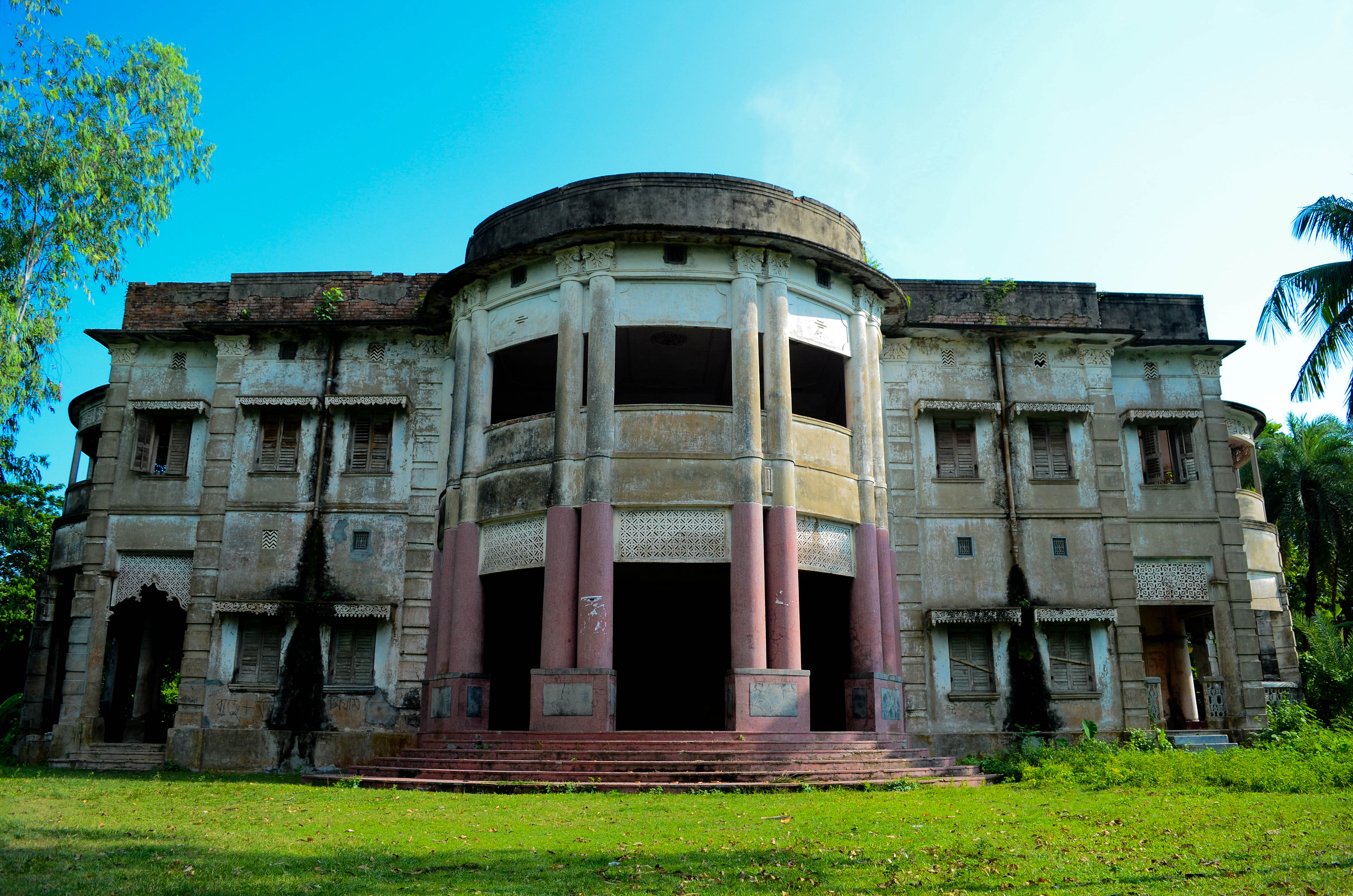
- Gunahar Zamindar Bari

- Coordinates: 24°52′N 89°10′E
- Country: Bangladesh
- Division: Rajshahi
- District: Bogra

Area
  - Total: 162.44 km^{2} (62.72 sq mi)

Population (2022)
  - Total: 195,075
  - Density: 1,200.9/km^{2} (3,110.3/sq mi)
- Time zone: UTC+6 (BST)
- Postal code: 5880
- Area code: 05024
- Website: dupchanchia.bogra.gov.bd(in Bengali)

Dhupchanchia Upazila mauza geocode map

Dhupchanchia Upazila (Bengali: দুপচাঁচিয়া উপজেলা) is an upazila of Bogra District in the Division of Rajshahi, Bangladesh. Dhupchanchia Thana was established in 1880 and was converted into an upazila in 1983. It is named after its administrative center, the town of Dhupchanchia.

== Geography ==
Dhupchanchia Upazila has a total area of 162.44 square kilometres (62.72 sq mi). It is bounded on the east by the Nagar River (across which lies Kahaloo Upazila). It borders Adamdighi Upazila to the south and west, Joypurhat District to the west and north, and Shibganj Upazila to the northeast.

Dhupchanchia Municipality has an area of 10.21 square kilometres (3.94 sq mi). It is situated about 20 km (12 mi) from the principal town of the District, Bogra.

== Demographics ==
Historical population
Year	Pop. (000)	±%
1981	122	—
1991	149	+22.1%
2001	161	+8.1%
2011	177	+9.9%
2022	195	+10.2%
Source: Bangladesh Bureau of Statistics

Religions in Dhupchanchia Upazila (2022)
Religion	Percent
Islam	92.50%
Hinduism	7.49%
Other or not stated	0.01%

According to the 2022 Bangladeshi census, Dupchachia Upazila had 54,921 households and a population of 195,075. 7.58% of the population were under 5 years of age. Dupchachia had a literacy rate (age 7 and over) of 73.53%: 76.62% for males and 70.70% for females, and a sex ratio of 93.18 males for every 100 females. 54,610 (27.99%) lived in urban areas.

According to the 2011 Census of Bangladesh, Dhupchanchia Upazila had 45,390 households and a population of 176,678. 33,157 (18.77%) were under 10 years of age. Dhupchanchia had a literacy rate (age 7 and over) of 51.69%, compared to the national average of 51.8%, and a sex ratio of 1029 females per 1000 males. 22,406 (12.68%) lived in urban areas.

== Economy ==
=== Hats and bazar ===
Hats and bazars are 15, the most noted of which are Dhap sultangonj Hat, Taluch Hat, Zianagar Hat, Talora Hat, and Saharpukur Hat, Chowmohoni Hat and Bazar. And bazars are open every day, the most noted bazar are tematha puraton bazar, c.o office bazar etc.

=== Main exports ===
Paddy, rice, potato, biscuit, fish, milk, wood, vegetables etc.

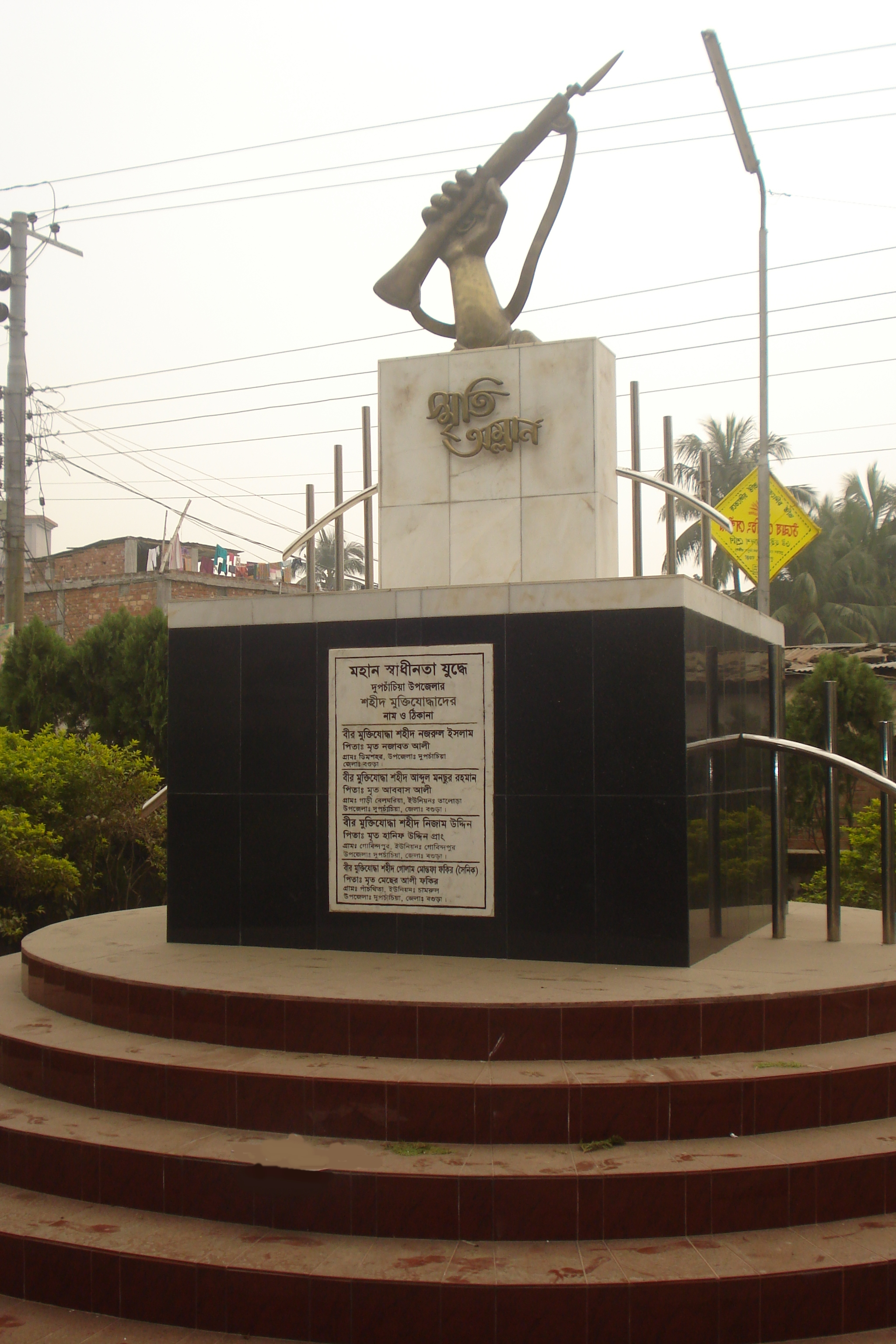
Smriti Omlan

== Points of interest ==
- Dargah of Sultan Shahi Sawar Dhap
- Gobindapur Temple
- Goyabandh Mazar
- Mazar of Pir Ziauddin
- Bhathanda Syed Mir Shaheb Mazar
- It is said that the Mazar of Mir Shaheb of Bhathanda village has a strange fruit tree called Khiri tree.

== Administration ==
Dhupchanchia Upazila is divided into two municipalities and six union parishads: Chamrul, Dhupchanchia, Gobindapur, Gunahar, Talora, and Zianagar. The union parishads are subdivided into 108 mauzas and 212 villages.

Dupchanchia Municipality was established in 2000. It has 9 wards and 37 mahallas. Md. Jahangir Alom (Bangladesh Nationalist Party) was elected mayor in 2008. Upazila Nirbahi Officer (UNO) Shahrukh Khan assumed office as the Municipal Administrator on January 19, 2025.

Talora Municipalicity was established in 2013.

== Infrastructure ==
=== Transport ===
Railway stations Altafnagar and Talora are on the branch line connecting Santahar and Kaunia. In July 2014 they were served by six or eight intercity and six mail trains a day.

=== Health centres ===
Upazila health complex 1, rural health centre 1, satellite clinic 1, family welfare centre 5.

== Education ==
According to Banglapedia, Talora Altaf Ali High School, founded in 1918, Dupchanchia Pilot High School, founded in 1923, and Dupchanchia Pilot Girls' High School, founded in 1910, are notable secondary schools. There are six colleges in the upazila. They include Dupchanchia J.K. Degree College, and Shahid M Monsur Ali College. Dupchanchia Mohila Degree College, founded in 1993, is the only honors level college in the upazila.

The madrasa education system includes four fazil madrasas.

== See also ==
- Upazilas of Bangladesh
- Districts of Bangladesh
- Divisions of Bangladesh
