= BIAM Model School and College, Bogura =

Educational institution in Bogra, Bangladesh

Coordinates: 24.8622°N 89.3611°E

- Uposhohor, Nishindara; Bogra, Bangladesh, Rajshahi, 5800

Information
- School type: Private Model School
- Motto: The toughest task for a human is to humanise
- Opened: 2006; 20 years ago
- School board: Board of Intermediate and Secondary Education, Rajshahi
- School code: EIIN: 132097
- Principal: Md. Mustafizur Rahman
- Language: Bengali
- Website: biammodelbogra.edu.bd

BIAM Model School and College is an educational institution located in Bogra District, Bangladesh. It operates under the Bangladesh Institute of Administration and Management (BIAM) Foundation. The educational institution is located in the Nishindara suburb of Bogra. The institute started its educational activities in 2006.

In 2014, it ranked among the top 20 schools under the Board of Intermediate and Secondary Education, Rajshahi in terms of results.

On 11 February 2019, a teacher and three students were stabbed during the annual sports competition at BIAM Model School and College.

== Criticism ==
Reports of extra fees being paid in the name of session fees and development fees during admissions to several schools and colleges in Bogra in defiance of the High Court order came up in various media, including BIAM Model High School and College.
