= SM Farooq =

Bangladeshi politician

- এস এম ফারুক

Member of the Bangladesh Parliament for Bogra-9
- In office 18 February 1979 – 12 February 1982
- Preceded by: Hashem Ali Khan

Personal details
- Born: 27 February 1951 (age 75) Kamargari, Adamdighi thana, East Pakistan
- Party: Bangladesh Nationalist Party

SM Farooq is a Bangladeshi politician. He was elected a member of parliament from Bogra-9 in the 1979 Bangladeshi general election as the Bangladesh Nationalist Party candidate.

== Biography ==
SM Farooq was born on 27 February 1951 in Kamargari village of what is now Adamdighi Upazila, Bogra District, Bangladesh.

SM Farooq was elected a member of parliament from Bogra-9 constituency as a Bangladesh Nationalist Party candidate in the 1979 Bangladeshi general election.
