= Shajahanpur Upazila =

Shajahanpur শাজাহানপুর
- Upazila
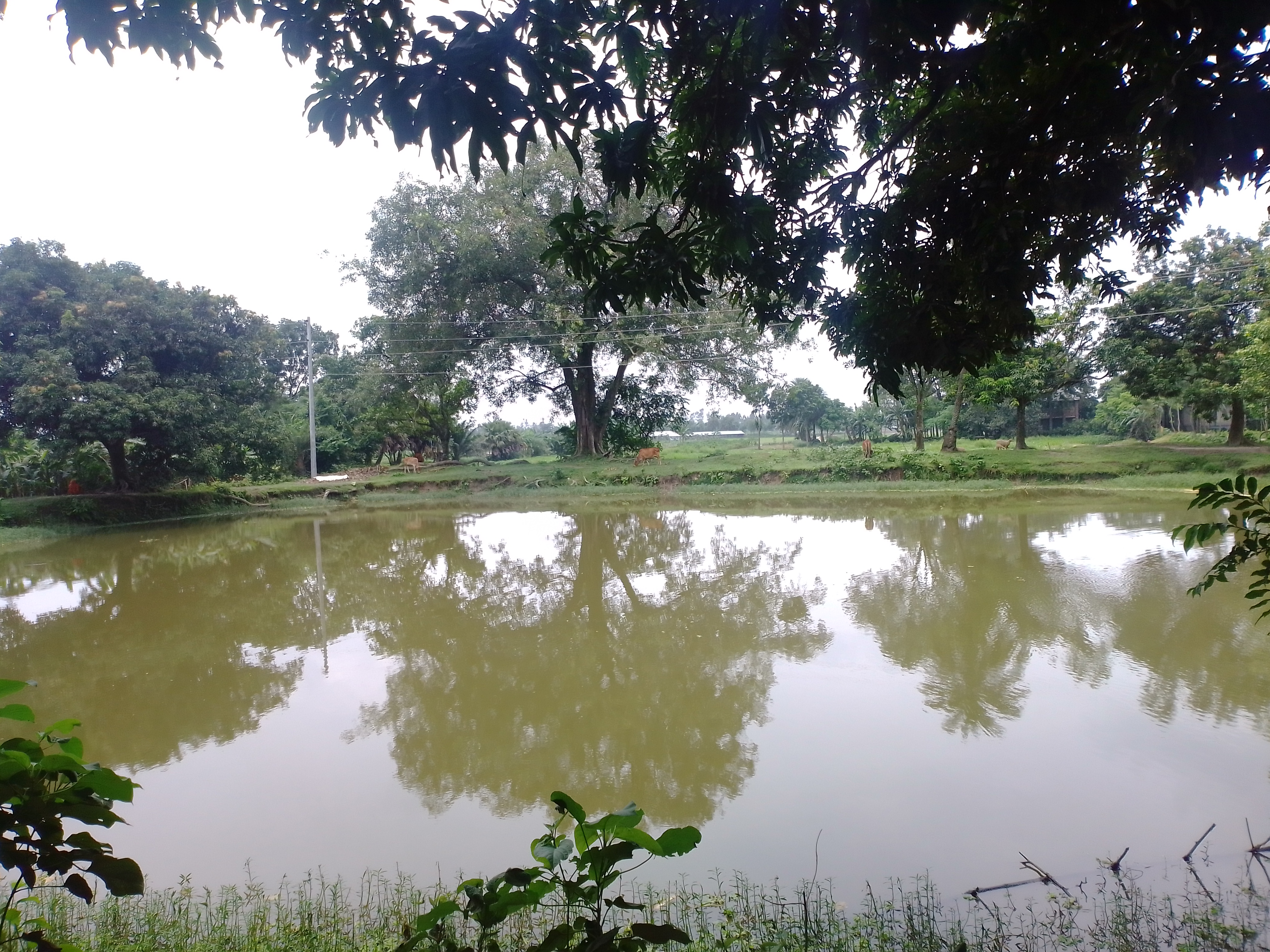
- Pond in Shoshankandi

- Coordinates: 24°46′N 89°24′E
- Country: Bangladesh
- Division: Rajshahi Division
- District: Bogra District

Area
  - Total: 221.69 km^{2} (85.59 sq mi)

Population (2022)
  - Total: 333,676
  - Density: 1,505.1/km^{2} (3,898.3/sq mi)
- Time zone: UTC+6 (BST)
- Website: shajahanpur.bogra.gov.bd(in Bengali)

Shajahanpur Upazila mauza geocode map

Shajahanpur Upazila (Bengali: শাজাহানপুর উপজেলা) is an upazila of Bogra District in Rajshahi Division, Bangladesh. Created in 2003, it is the newest upazila in the District.

== Geography ==
Shajahanpur Upazila has a total area of 221.69 square kilometres (85.59 sq mi). It borders Bogura Sadar Upazila to the north, Gabtali and Dhunat upazilas to the east, Sherpur Upazila to the south, Nandigram Upazila to the southwest, and Kahaloo Upazila to the west. The Karatoya River flows south through the upazila.

== Demographics ==
Historical population
Year	Pop. (000)	±%
1981	-	—
1991	-	—
2001	-	—
2011	290	—
2022	334	+15.2%
The upazila was created in 2003, prior to that the population was part of Bogra Sadar Upazila; Source: Bangladesh Bureau of Statistics

Religions in Shajahanpur Upazila (2022)
Religion	Percent
Islam	96.32%
Hinduism	3.63%
Other or not stated	0.05%

According to the 2022 Bangladeshi census, Shajahanpur Upazila had 88,736 households and a population of 333,676. 8.10% of the population were under 5 years of age. Shajahanpur had a literacy rate (age 7 and over) of 78.85%: 80.95% for males and 76.70% for females, and a sex ratio of 103.34 males for every 100 females. 86,919 (26.05%) lived in urban areas.

According to the 2011 Census of Bangladesh, Shajahanpur Upazila had 72,685 households and a population of 289,804. 56,145 (19.37%) were under 10 years of age. Shajahanpur had a literacy rate (age 7 and over) of 57.71%, compared to the national average of 51.8%, and a sex ratio of 939 females per 1000 males. 62,140 (21.44%) lived in urban areas.

== Administration ==
Bogra Municipality falls mainly within Bogra Sadar Upazila, but a small part of the municipality (one ward, portions of two others, Majhira Cantonment, and Jahangirabad Cantonment) lies inside Shajahanpur Upazila. These wards are divided into 18 mahallas. The remainder of the upazila is divided into nine union parishads: Amrool, Aria, Asekpur, Chopinagar, Gohail, Kharna, Khotta Para, Madla, and Majhira. The union parishads are subdivided into 120 mauzas and 166 villages.

== Education ==
There are six colleges in the upazila. There are two degree colleges- Kamaruddin Islamia College founded in 1986 and Dublagari College, founded in 1986.

Bogra Cantonment Public School and College, founded in 1979, is in Majhira Cantonment. Millennium Scholastic School & College, founded in 1998, is in Jahangirabad Cantonment.

Aria Rahimabad high school, founded in 2017, is in Nagarhat, Amrool Union. The technical and vocational education system has one college, Ranirhat Technical College, founded in 2000.

The madrasa education system includes six fazil and two kamil madrasas.

== See also ==
- Upazilas of Bangladesh
- Districts of Bangladesh
- Divisions of Bangladesh
- Administrative geography of Bangladesh
