= Nagar River (Rajshahi) =

River in Rajshahi, Bangladesh

Coordinates: 24°30′17″N 89°08′27″E

Nagar River (Bengali: নাগর নদ) begins in the Bogra District of Bangladesh and ends in Natore District.

== Early history ==
The Nagar is a branch of the Karatoya and serves as the boundary between the Shibganj and Bogra thanas, for about 11 kilometres (7 mi). It then passes between the former and the Dhupchanchia Upazila and then Adamdighi down to the village of Champapur. It then turns off westwards and passing through the Dupchanchia thana enters Rajshahi district. It falls in the Atrai, at Singra Upazila in the Natore District. It is a tortuous river, and its whole length in this district, including the windings, is about 48 kilometres (30 mi). On its banks are situated the important villages of Elahiganj and Dhupchanchia. It is one of the important rivers of Kalai Upazila in Joypurhat district.

The Nagar is navigable by boat only during the rainy season.
