= Mustafabia Alia Madrasah =

Madrasa in Bogra, Bangladesh

Government Mustafabia Alia Madrasha
- Bogra; Bangladesh

Information
- Type: Public
- Motto: Read, Knowledge is Light
- Established: 1925
- School board: Bangladesh Madrasah Education Board
- Principal: Mohammad Mokhlesur Rahman
- Grades: Class one - Kamil (M.A.)
- Sports: Football, cricket

Government Mustafabia Alia Madrasah (Bengali: সরকারি মুস্তাফাবিয়া আলিয়া মাদ্‌রাসা, Arabic: المدرسة العالية المصطفاوية الحكومية) is a government-run kamil (tertiary) madrasah in the Namazgor-Goyalgari area of Bogra in northern Bangladesh. The madrasha was established in 1925. It was named for Allama Mustafa Madani, who was the popular Islamic scholar at the time in British India. The former principal was Allama Abu Nasar Md. Nojibullah. The principal is Shaykh Mohammad Najrul Islam..
