= Shibganj Upazila, Bogra =

Shibganj শিবগঞ্জ
- Upazila
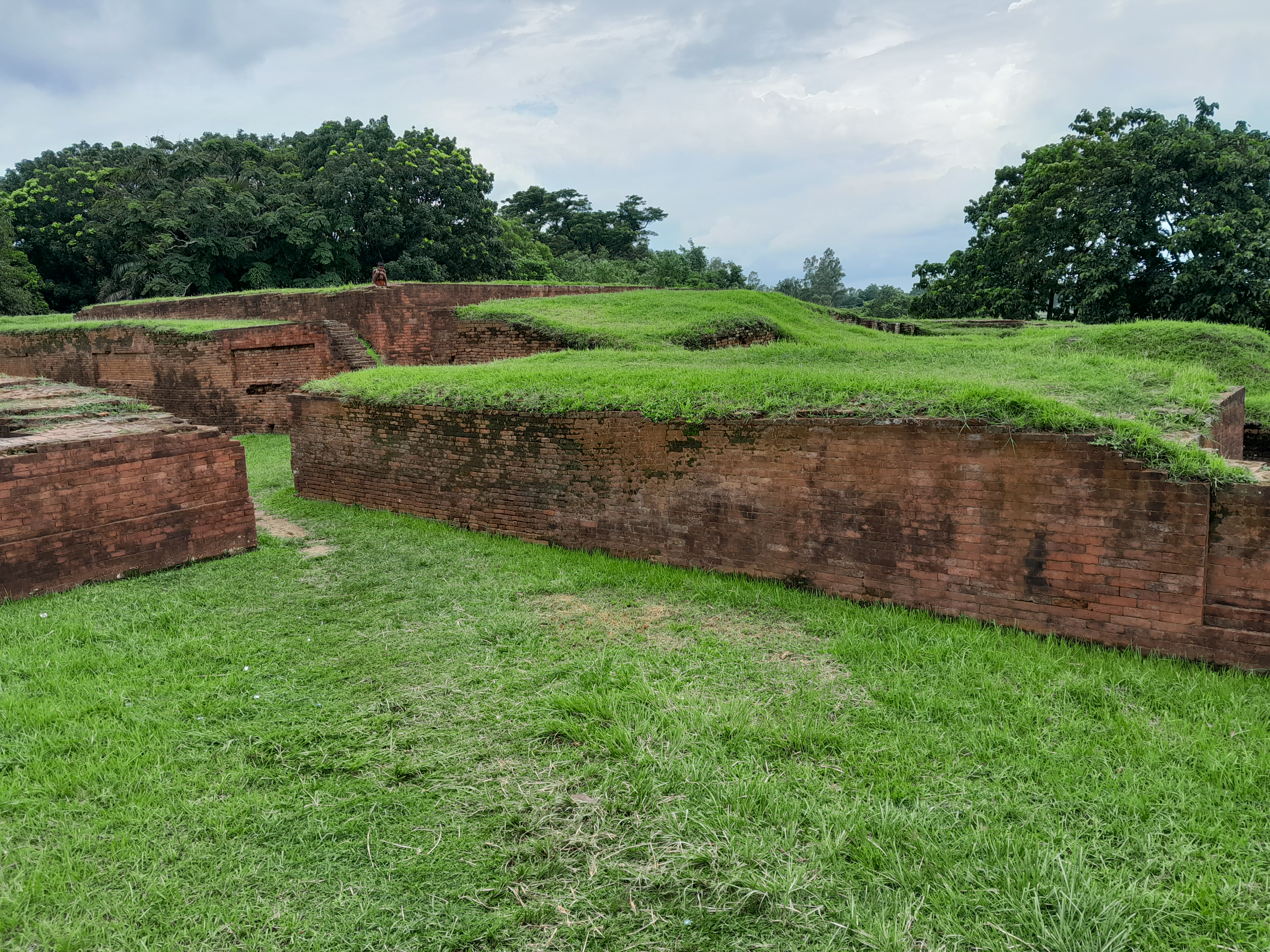
- Govinda Bhita, Mahasthangarh

- Coordinates: 25°1′N 89°19′E
- Country: Bangladesh
- Division: Rajshahi
- District: Bogra

Area
  - Total: 314.92 km^{2} (121.59 sq mi)

Population (2022)
  - Total: 400,456
  - Density: 1,271.6/km^{2} (3,293.5/sq mi)
- Time zone: UTC+6 (BST)
- Postal code: 5810
- Area code: 05020
- Website: shibganj.bogra.gov.bd (in Bengali)

Shibganj Upazila (Bengali: শিবগঞ্জ উপজেলা) is an upazila of Bogra District in the Division of Rajshahi, Bangladesh. The upazila was created in 1983. It is named after its administrative center, the town of Shibganj.

== Geography ==
Shibganj Upazila has a total area of 314.92 square kilometres (121.59 sq mi). It is the northernmost upazila of Bogra District. It borders Rangpur Division to the north, Sonatala and Gabtali upazilas to the east, Bogra Sadar and Kahaloo upazilas to the south, Dupchanchia Upazila to the southwest, and Joypurhat District to the west. The Karatoya River flows south through the upazila.

== Demographics ==
Historical population
Year	Pop. (000)	±%
1981	283	—
1991	313	+10.6%
2001	352	+12.5%
2011	379	+7.7%
2022	400	+5.5%
Source: Bangladesh Bureau of Statistics

Religions in Shibganj Upazila (2022)
Religion	Percent
Islam	95.40%
Hinduism	4.56%
Other or not stated	0.04%

According to the 2022 Bangladeshi census, Shibganj Upazila had 115,003 households and a population of 400,456. 7.97% of the population were under 5 years of age. Shibganj had a literacy rate (age 7 and over) of 67.76%: 71.27% for males and 64.40% for females, and a sex ratio of 96.68 males for every 100 females. 38,366 (9.58%) lived in urban areas.

According to the 2011 Census of Bangladesh, Shibganj Upazila had 99,242 households and a population of 378,700. 74,741 (19.74%) were under 10 years of age. Shibganj had a literacy rate (age 7 and over) of 44.09%, compared to the national average of 51.8%, and a sex ratio of 989 females per 1000 males. 21,643 (5.72%) lived in urban areas.

== Points of interest ==
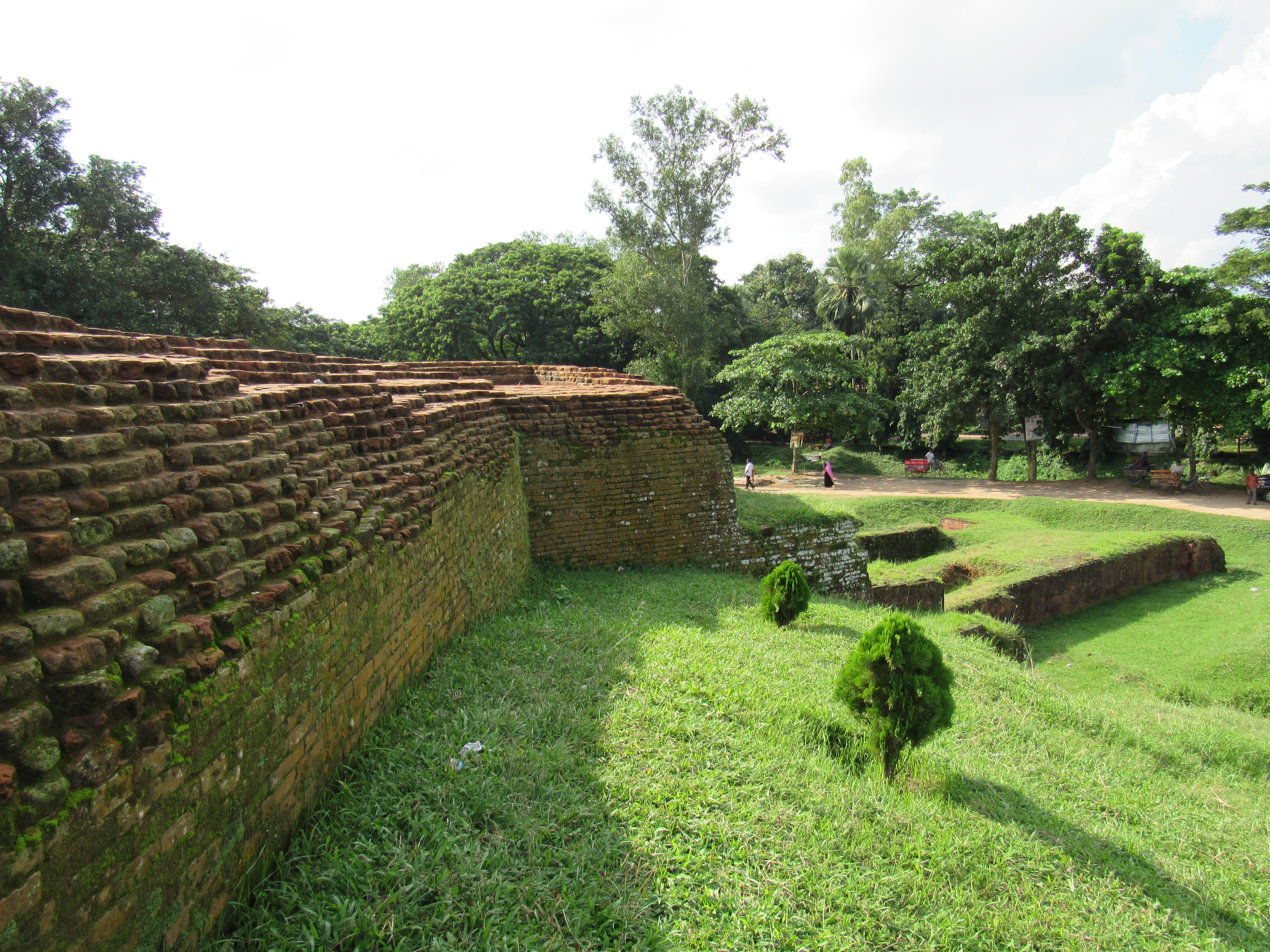
Mahasthangarh, Bogra

Mahasthangarh is the earliest urban archaeological site in Bangladesh. It's also the largest. The citadel covers more than 2 square kilometres (0.77 sq mi), and many more mounds are spread over the surrounding 100 square kilometres (39 sq mi) on the west bank of the Karatoya River. Lonely Planet describes it as one of Bangladesh's two "most famous and impressive archaeological sites." A museum exhibits artifacts excavated at the site: sculptures, inscriptions, terracotta plaques depicting scenes from daily life, beads, coins, and ceramics shards.

== Administration ==

Shibganj Upazila is divided into Shibganj Municipality and 12 union parishads: Shibganj, Bihar, Roynagar, Buriganj, Majhihatta, Pirab, Atmul, Kichak, Maidanhata, Deuli, Mokamtala, and Saidpur. The union parishads are subdivided into 233 mauzas and 409 villages.

Shibganj Municipality is subdivided into 9 wards and 31 mahallas.

== Education ==
There are seven colleges in the upazila. They include Mohasthan Mahi Sawar Degree College, Mokamtala Women's Degree College, Pirob United Degree College, Chowdhury Adarsha Mahila College and Govt. M H College, founded in 1972.

The madrasa education system in the upazila includes five fazil madrasas.

== Notable people ==
- Prafulla Chaki, revolutionary and nationalist, was born in Bihar village under the upazila in 1888.
- Mahmudur Rahman Manna, politician, stood as a Bangladesh Awami League candidate for the Bogra-2 constituency in the general election of 2001. However, he lost the poll.
- M. R. Akhtar Mukul, author and journalist, migrated to Mahasthangarh after partition in 1947.
- Fazlul Bari, politician and provincial minister of East Pakistan.

== See also ==
- Upazilas of Bangladesh
- Districts of Bangladesh
- Divisions of Bangladesh
