= Santahar–Kaunia line =

Railway line in Bangladesh

Coordinates: 25.1208°N 89.5152°E

Overview
- Status: Operational
- Owner: Bangladesh Railway
- Locale: Bangladesh
- Termini: Santahar; Kaunia
- Stations: 29

Service
- Train number(s): 20 services daily

History
- Opened: 1899-1905

Technical
- Line length: 167 kilometres (104 mi)
- Track length: 167 kilometres (104 mi)
- Number of tracks: 1; 2 in some places
- Track gauge: meter gauge (1,000 mm (3 ft 3 3/8 in)
- Electrification: None
- Operating speed: 50 kilometres per hour (31 mph) (for 1,000 mm (3 ft 3 3/8 in) gauge) & 75 kilometres per hour (47 mph) (for 1,676 mm (5 ft 6 in) gauge)
- Highest elevation: varies

Santahar–Kaunia line is a meter gauge line under Bangladesh Railway. This line is built by Bhramhaputra - Sultanpur railway company between 1899 and 1905.

== History ==
The Brahmaputra–Sultanpur Railway Company constructed the 94-kilometre-long (58 mi) metre-gauge railway track from Santahar to Fulchhari (Tistamukh) in 1899–1900. Presently the line is up to Balashi Ghat in Phulchhari Upazila. The 44-kilometre-long (27 mi) Bonarpara–Kaunia line was constructed in 1905.

== Assam Mail ==
The prestigious Assam Mail originally ran along this track in the British days from Santahar to Amingaon.

== Ferry ==
In Bangladesh, ferries are often an integrated part of the railway system. There were two major ferry points across the Jamuna, one between Bahadurabad Ghat and Tistamukh Ghat and the other between Jagannath Ghat and Sirajganj Ghat.

The ferry system had reached the limits of its capacity. While marginal capacity additions were still feasible, to cope with any significant increase in capacity or even normal traffic growth was virtually felt to be impossible.

The construction of the 4.9-kilometre-long (3.0 mi) Bangabandhu Bridge has completely changed the scope of communication systems in that part of the country. The ferry system at both the Bahadurabad Ghat–Balashi Ghat and the Jagannathganj Ghat–Sirajganj Ghat was virtually closed. Only limited freight transportation continued on the Bahadurabad Ghat–Balashi section. Even that has been closed down in 2010 because of formation of shoal in the river.
