= Rustam Ali =

Bangladeshi politician (died 2023)

- রুস্তম আলী

Member of the Bangladesh Parliament for Rangpur-21
- In office 18 February 1979 – 12 February 1982
- Preceded by: Shah Jahangir Kabir
- Succeeded by: Fazle Rabbi Miah

Personal details
- Born: Mohammad Rustam Ali Mollah c. 1920 Char Deluabari, Phulchhari, Gaibandha, British India
- Died: 6 June 2023 Bogra, Bangladesh
- Party: Bangladesh Nationalist Party
- Other political affiliations: National Awami Party (Muzaffar)

Rustam Ali who was known as Rustam Ali Mollah (c. 1920 – 6 June 2023) was a Bangladeshi politician, language warrior and organizer of the liberation war. He was elected a member of parliament from Rangpur-21 in the 1979 Bangladeshi general election.

== Early life ==
Rustam Ali was born c. 1920 in Char Deluabari village of Phulchari in Gaibandha, then British India. He lived in the western suburbs of Gaibandha. He has five sons and two daughters in his married life. His son Mahamudun Nabi Tutul is the general secretary of the Bangladesh Nationalist Party of Gaibandha District.

== Career ==
Rustam Ali started his career as a teacher and retired as principal of Shaghata Pilot Girls School and College. He was involved in politics from his student days. He was a language soldier and an organizer of the liberation war.

He first sought election to parliament, unsuccessfully, in 1973 as a National Awami Party (Muzaffar) candidate.

He was the founding convener and advisor of Gaibandha District BNP. He was elected a member of parliament from the Rangpur-21 constituency as a Bangladesh Nationalist Party candidate in the 1979 Bangladeshi general election.

== Death ==
Rustam Ali died on 6 June 2023 in TMSS Hospital in Bogra, aged 103.
