= Mahimaganj Union =

Mahimaganj Union মহিমাগঞ্জ ইউনিয়ন
- Union
- Location in Bangladesh
- Coordinates: 25.106530°N 89.488797°E
- Country: Bangladesh
- Division: Rangpur Division
- District: Gaibandha District
- Upazila: Gobindaganj Upazila

Government
  - Chairman: Md. Anowarul Islam Prodhan

Area
  - Total: 23.9 km^{2} (9.2 sq mi)

Population (2011)
  - Total: 36,791
  - Density: 1,639/km^{2} (4,240/sq mi)
- Time zone: UTC+6 (BST)
- Postal code: 5741
- Website: mahimaganjup.gaibandha.gov.bd

Mahimaganj (Bengali: মহিমাগঞ্জ) is a union parishad under Gobindaganj Upazila, Gaibandha District, Rangpur Division, Bangladesh. It is located 12 kilometres (7.5 mi) east of Gobindaganj. There is a sugar mill named Rangpur Sugar Mills Limited. There is a railway station. There are many primary schools, high schools, madrashas and colleges in Mahimaganj. Mahimaganj Alia Kamil Madrasha is one of the largest madrasha institution in North Bengal which is situated in Mahimaganj.

== Geography ==
Mahimaganj Union has a total area of 5,912 acres (2,393 ha). The Bangali River is the union's approximate eastern boundary (across which lies Saghata Upazila).

== Demographics ==
According to the 2011 Bangladesh census, Mahimaganj Union had 9,252 households and a population of 36,791. The literacy rate (age 7 and over) was 44.4%, compared to the national average of 51.8%.

== Organization ==
Sugar mills

- Rangpur Sugar Mills Limited has a daily capacity of 1,500 metric tons.

=== Prodhan Group ===
Rice mills

- M/s. Prodhan Traders (Exporter & Importer). {Est.-1988}
- M/s. Nehan Traders (Exporter & Importer). {Est.-2006}
- M/s. Prodhan Agro Food Industries has a daily capacity of 100 metric tons. {Est.-2010}
- M/s. Tania Agro Food Industries has a daily capacity of 100 metric tons. {Est.-2011}
- Prodhan Food Agro Industries Limited has a daily capacity of 350 metric tons. {Est.-2013}
- Nehan Agro Industries has a daily capacity of 150 metric tons. {Est.-2014}

Oil mills

- Prodhan Oil Mill's Limited has a daily capacity of 350 metric tons. (Rice Bran Oil). {Est.-2015}

=== Nehan Group ===
- M/s. Nehan Traders (Exporter & Importer) {Est.-2014}
- M/s. Nehan Agro Industries. {Est.-2015}

=== Sports organizations ===
- Mahimaganj Town Club XI
- Mahimaganj Kheloar Kallyan Club

Cultural Organizations:

- Mahimaganj Shilpakala Academy

== Administration ==
Mahimaganj Union is divided into 11 mauzas: Balua, Baman Hazra, Bochadaha, Jagadishpur, Jibanpur, Jirai, Khurda Gopalpur, Kumiradanga, Pantair, Panthamari, and Sreepatipur.

== Transport ==
The Mahimaganj Railway Station is the main railway station providing trains on national routes operated by the state-run Bangladesh Railway.

== Education ==
M A Motalib technical & BM College, Mahimaganj Degree College, founded in 1972 and Mahimaganj Women's College, founded in 1999 are the major college in the union.

According to Banglapedia, Rangpur Sugar Mills KG High School, founded in 1962, is a notable secondary school.

The madrasa education system includes one kamil madrasa, Mahimaganj Alia Kamil Madrasa, founded in 1937.

== Notable residents ==
- Ahmed Hossain (Chairman Rangpur District Board, Minister for Agriculture, Forest & Fisheries)
