= Md. Mahabub Elahi Ronju =

Bangladeshi freedom fighter

Md. Mahabub Elahi Ronju Bir Protik Bir Protik
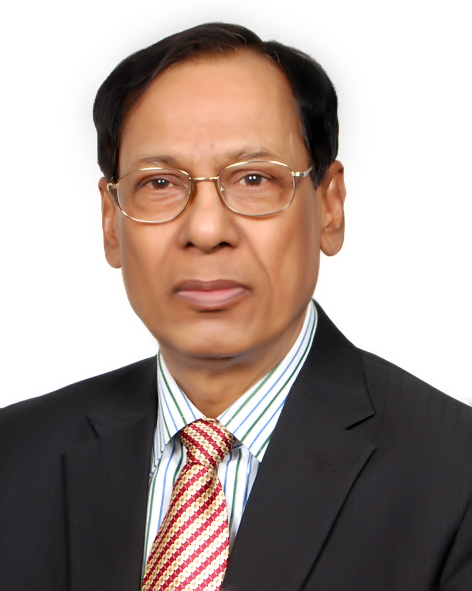
- Born: June 17, 1952 (age 74); Munshipara, Gaibandha Sadar, East Bengal, Dominion of Pakistan
- Education: Gaibandha Govt. High School (1968); Rajshahi Govt. College (1970)
- Alma mater: University of Rajshahi (B.Sc(Hons) and Masters in Statistics)
- Occupations: Freedom fighter; businessman
- Spouse: Fatema Zinat
- Children: 3 (2 sons and 1 daughter)
- Parents: Late Fazle Elahi (father); Late Meherun Nessa (mother)
- Awards: Bir Protik

Md. Mahabub Elahi Ronju Bir Protik (/ˌmɑːhɑːˈbʊb ɛˈlɑːhi ˈrɒndʒuː/ MAH-hah-BUUB el-AH-hee RON-joo; born June 17, 1952) is a heroic Bangladeshi freedom fighter, who was awarded the national gallantry award "Bir Protik" for his valor in the liberation war of 1971 against Pakistan. He is also well-known for his appearances on various media platforms. Currently, he is a businessman.

== Early life and education ==
Mahabub was born on June 17, 1952, in Munshipara, Gaibandha Sadar. He is the eldest son of the late Fazle Elahi and the late Meherun Nessa, and the second child in the family. He completed his high school in 1968 from Gaibandha Govt. High School (SSC-1968) and his college from Rajshahi Govt. College on 1970 (HSC-1970). He further pursued his B.Sc. (Hons) degree and Master's degree in Statistics from the University of Rajshahi.

== Participation in the Liberation War ==
In 1971, when Mahabub was a student of the Department of Statistics, University of Rajshahi, Bangladesh, he participated in the Liberation War of Bangladesh. After the declaration of independence of Bangladesh by the Father of the nation, Bangabandhu Sheikh Mujibur Rahman, Mahabub joined the "Mukti Bahini" as a Freedom Fighter against the Pakistan Occupation Army in the Gaibandha area. He travelled to India to enlist for his military training at Tura of Meghalaya. Upon successful completion of his training, he was selected as a platoon commander. He then commenced a guerilla war against the Pakistan Occupation Army along with his platoon under sector-11, sub-sector Mankarchar. He was awarded as the company commander of the newly formed "Ronju Company" for leading numerous successful military operations.

=== Notable battles ===
Ronju company, led by Mahabub, achieved significant victories in several battles, including the battles of Badiyakhali, Balashighat, Rasulpur Sluice Gate, Raydashbarir ghat, Konchipara, Kamarjani, Poolbandi, etc. His company also won the battle of Saporhati, Shundorganj thana area and the battle of Rotonpur and Uriaghat at Fulchari Thana area. His troops fully obliterated the bridges of Badiakhali and Dariyapur in the Gaibandha Sadar Thana area. They occupied the Kaiyar haat and Ketkir haat Razakar camp. They also arrested a large number of Razakar and recovered their weapons after a fierce exchange of gunfire. Ronju company captured a plethora of weapons owned by the Pakistan occupation Army from the field and apprehended several Pakistani soldiers. On 7 December 1971, Ronju company accomplished a monumental achievement of the Mukti Bahini by capturing the Gaibandha town.

=== Post-war recognition ===
After the liberation war, he was honoured with the national gallantry award 'Bir Protik" by the Government of the People's Republic of Bangladesh.

== Personal life ==
His father, late Fazle Elahi, who was a government officer, died due to the mental and physical atrocities and torments committed by Razakars and the Pakistani army as a result of Mahabub's inclusion in the Mukti Bahini. After his father's death in 1972, Mahabub took the responsibility of his family. In 1985, he married Mrs. Fatema Zinat, and they have two sons and a daughter.

== Later life and career ==
He is currently a businessman and is actively involved with many social organizations. He is a committed Rotarian and the past president of the Rotary Club of Mukto Swadesh, which was formed with Freedom Fighters only. He is also the vice president of the Khetab Prapto Muktijoddha Association, Gaibandha Samiti. He is also well known for his various media interactions and has been featured on numerous channels, including Shomoy, Channel I, BTV, ATN News, NTV, Nexus Tv, Mohona Tv, Ekushey, etc.

== List of activities ==
- Founder Adhunik Nirmata Construction Company (present state - dissolved)
- Proprietor Hamiro Glass (dissolved)
- Chairman Axiom Global Education
- Ex-president 2018-2019 Rotary Club Mukto Swadesh (still active in Rotary)
- Current Vice President Khetabprapto Muktijoddha Association
- Current Vice President Gaibandha Samiti

== List of media appearances ==
- Shuvo Shondha NTV
- Tritiyo Matra Channel i
- ATN News
- DBC News
- Channel 24
- DoinikBarta
