= Abdul Mannan Mandal =

Bangladeshi politician (c. 1953–2018)

- আব্দুল মান্নান মন্ডল

Member of Parliament for Gaibandha-4
- In office 15 February 1996 – 12 June 1996
- Preceded by: Lutfar Rahman Chowdhury
- Succeeded by: Lutfar Rahman Chowdhury

Personal details
- Born: c. 1953 Gaibandha District
- Died: 7 June 2018 Dhaka
- Party: Bangladesh Nationalist Party

Abdul Mannan Mandal (c. 1953-7 June 2018) was a politician of the Bangladesh Nationalist Party. He was elected a member of parliament for Gaibandha-4 in February 1996.

== Early life ==
Mandal was born in 1953 in Gaibandha District.

== Career ==
Mandal started his political career in 1974 through the Chhatra League. After that, he joined Bangladesh Jatiotabadi Chatra Dal. He was the joint secretary of BNP's Gobindaganj Thana in 1988 and the president of Gobindaganj Upazila BNP since 1992–2018.

He was elected to parliament for Gaibandha-4 as a Bangladesh Nationalist Party candidate in the 15 February 1996 Bangladeshi general election. He was defeated in the 7th Jatiya Sangsad elections on 12 June 1996 as a candidate of the Bangladesh Nationalist Party from Gaibandha-4 constituency.

He was the principal of Hakimpur Degree College in Dinajpur. He was the elected chairman of the Shakhahar Union for five consecutive terms from 1965 to 1982.

== Death ==
Mandal died on 7 June 2018.
