= Shamim Kaisar Lincoln =

Bangladeshi politician

- শামীম কায়সার লিংকন
- Shamim in 2026

Minister of State for Religious Affairs
- Incumbent
- Assumed office 21 August 2026
- President: Mirza Fakhrul Islam Alamgir
- Prime Minister: Tarique Rahman
- Preceded by: Shahjahan Mia

Member of Parliament
- Incumbent
- Assumed office 17 February 2026
- Preceded by: Abul Kalam Azad
- Constituency: Gaibandha-4

Personal details
- Born: Mohammad Shamim Kaiser; 23 February 1980 (age 46) Gobindaganj Upazila, Gaibandha, Bangladesh
- Party: Bangladesh Nationalist Party
- Occupation: Politician

Mohammad Shamim Kaiser also known as Lincoln is a Bangladesh Nationalist Party politician and a member of parliament representing Gaibandha-4. He also serves as the State Minister for Religious Affairs of Bangladesh.

== Career ==
Lincoln was elected to parliament from Gaibandha-4 as a Bangladesh Nationalist Party candidate in a May 2006 by-election following the death of incumbent Abdul Mottaleb Akanda. In the 2026 Bangladeshi general election, he won from the same constituency from BNP.
