= Pushpita Gupta =

Former British Labour Councillor and Human Rights Activist

Pushpita Gupta (born 16 January 1971) is a British Labour Party politician and human rights activist, who is the former councillor for the Seven Kings ward in the London Borough of Redbridge serving from 2021 to 2026. She lost her council seat in the 2026 United Kingdom local elections contesting Hainault ward to Reform candidate, Neil Philip Anderson, losing by 10 votes.

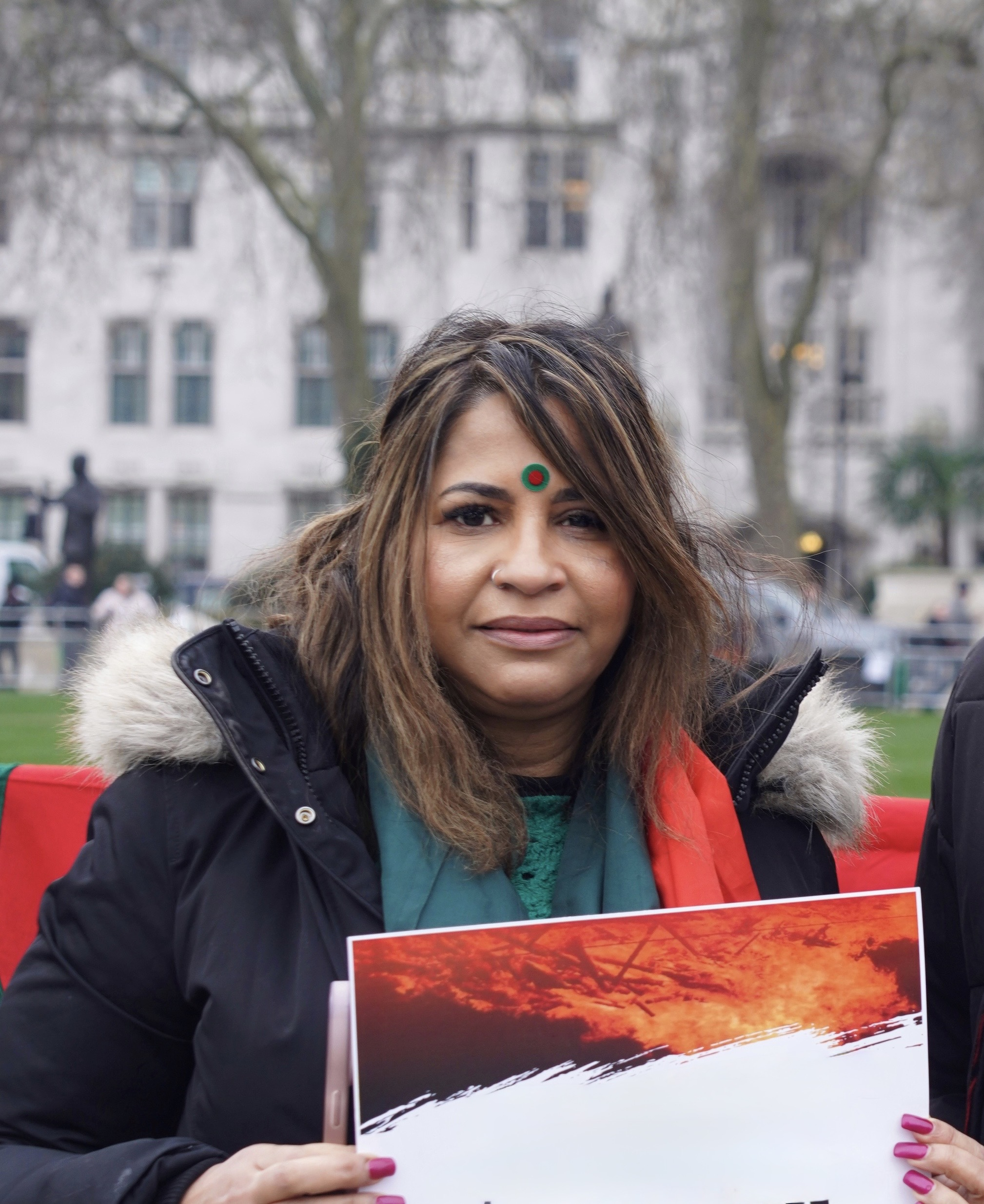
Pushpita Gupta at a UK human chain, protesting Bangladeshi Hindu persecution in 2024.

Born in Bangladesh during the Liberation War, Gupta is a vocal advocate for secularism and the protection of religious minorities in South Asia. She is the founder and president of the Secular Bangladesh Movement UK and serves in the United Hindu Alliance, where she campaigns against Islamist extremism and the persecution of Hindus in Bangladesh.

== Early life and background ==
Gupta was born in January 1971 in East Pakistan (now Bangladesh) during the early stages of the Bangladesh Liberation War. Gupta's family was involved in the independence struggle; her father and grandfathers were freedom fighters (Mukti Bahini), and several members of her extended family were killed during the conflict.

She has cited the collective trauma of the 1971 genocide—specifically the targeted extermination and displacement of Hindus—as the foundational motivation for her later human rights activism. She moved to the United Kingdom around 2006, settling in the London Borough of Redbridge.

Before entering politics, she worked in the education and business sectors, serving as a director for the London College of Media & Technology Limited and Pushpita Limited.

== Political career ==
Gupta entered British politics as a member of the Labour Party. On 6 May 2021, she contested a by-election for the Seven Kings ward in Redbridge. She won decisively, securing 2,227 votes (57.4 per cent of the vote share) and defeating the Conservative candidate by a significant margin. Her campaign focused on community safety, street accessibility, and improved policing.

She was re-elected in the 2022 London borough council elections, topping the poll in her ward with 1,707 votes. In her capacity as councillor, Gupta sits on the Planning Committee and works within the Redbridge Labour Group to represent the borough's diverse South Asian diaspora.

== Activism and advocacy ==
=== Secular Bangladesh Movement UK ===
In December 2015, Gupta founded the Secular Bangladesh Movement UK an organization established to counter the rise of religious intolerance following the 2014 Bangladesh general election.

The movement was a response to a wave of post-election violence in districts such as Jessore and Gaibandha, where Hindu homes and businesses were targeted. Gupta has led fact-finding missions to affected areas, including Shundargonj in Gaibandha, to document atrocities against minority voters.

Secular Bangladesh Movement, UK operates with a team of organisers including Nishit Sarker Mithu, a blogger and human rights activist focusing on minority rights and secularism in South Asia.

She also serves as the international secretary of the Ekattorer Ghatak Dalal Nirmul Committee (Committee for Resisting Killers and Collaborators of Bangladesh Liberation War of 1971), lobbying for the trial of war criminals and opposing the rehabilitation of Islamist political factions.

=== United Nations participation ===
In November 2015, Gupta represented the Secular Bangladesh Movement UK at the eighth session of the UN Forum on Minority Issues in Geneva. In her address, she presented data on the demographic decline of the Bangladeshi Hindu population—from over 22 per cent in 1951 to under 9 per cent in 2011—and detailed specific failures of the justice system to prosecute violence against minorities.

She called on Western governments and international bodies to link foreign aid to verifiable protections for religious minorities and urged the restoration of the 1972 constitution's secular framework.

=== Response to 2024 political crisis ===
Following the resignation of Prime Minister Sheikh Hasina in August 2024, Gupta became a critic of the interim government led by Muhammad Yunus. As the security situation for minorities deteriorated, with reports of widespread arson and looting of Hindu properties, Gupta assumed the role of member secretary for the United Hindu Alliance (UHA) in the UK.

She characterized the political shift as a boon for Islamist extremism, arguing that the removal of the secular Awami League government left minorities vulnerable to "targeted extermination". In late 2024 and early 2025, she led a delegation to New Delhi to lobby the Government of India for intervention. She has publicly expressed a lack of confidence in the Yunus administration's willingness to hold elections or protect non-Muslim citizens.
