= Ataur Rahman (Gaibandha politician) =

Bangladeshi politician

- আতাউর রহমান

Member of the Bangladesh Parliament for Gaibandha-4
- In office 1988–1990
- Preceded by: Lutfar Rahman Chowdhury
- Succeeded by: Lutfar Rahman Chowdhury

Ataur Rahman is a politician of Gaibandha district of Bangladesh and a former member of parliament for the Gaibandha-4 constituency in 1988.

== Career ==
Rahman was elected to parliament from Gaibandha-4 as an independent candidate in 1988.
