= Maqbular Rahman Sarkar =

- মকবুলার রহমান সরকার

Vice-Chancellor of the University of Rajshahi
- In office 28 February 1981 – 22 February 1982
- Preceded by: Muhammad Abdul Bari
- Succeeded by: Moslem Huda

Personal details
- Born: 1928
- Died: 19 May 1985 (aged 56–57)
- Spouse: Khujista Akhtar Fasiha
- Education: University of Liverpool; University of Dhaka; Rajshahi College; Carmichael College
- Nickname: M. R. Sarkar

Maqbular Rahman Sarkar (Bengali: মকবুলার রহমান সরকার; 1928–19 May 1985), popularly known as M. R. Sarkar, was a Bangladeshi academic who served as the tenth vice-chancellor of the University of Rajshahi.

== Early life and education ==
Sarkar was born in 1928, to a Bengali Muslim family of Sarkars in the village of Khorddakomarpur in Sadullapur, Gaibandha (formerly under Rangpur District), Bengal Province. After completing his primary education in his village, he enrolled at the Tulshighat Kashinath High School from where he passed his matriculation in 1944. He then moved on to study at the Carmichael College in Rangpur where he passed his intermediates in 1946. He completed his Bachelor of Science from Rajshahi College in 1847, and graduated as Master of Science from the University of Dhaka in 1950.

== Career ==
Sarkar joined the Department of Physics at the University of Dhaka as a lecturer in 1951. He received from the University of Liverpool his Doctor of Philosophy qualification in that year. Under the East Pakistan Education Service, he joined the Rajshahi College Physics Department and served as professor until 1963. From 1969 to 1972, he was working as a visiting professor at the University of Libya. He then returned to the University of Rajshahi, and founded the department of Applied Physics and Electronics, becoming the department's founding head professor too. From 27 February 1981 to 22 February 1982, he served as the tenth vice-chancellor of the University of Rajshahi.

== Death ==
Sarkar died on 19 May 1985.
