= Abdul Mottaleb Akanda =

Bangladeshi politician

Member of Bangladesh Parliament

Personal details
- Died: 11 March 2006
- Party: Bangladesh Nationalist Party

Abdul Mottaleb Akanda was a Bangladesh Nationalist Party politician and a former member of parliament for Gaibandha-4.

== Career ==
Mottaleb Akanda was renowned for his contributions to the education and welfare in Gobindaganj in Gaibandha District. Later, Akanda was elected to parliament from Gaibandha-4 as a Bangladesh Nationalist Party candidate in 2001. He diverted flood relief to Mahimaganj Union, even though the union voted for Abdul Latif Prodhan, a Bangladesh Awami League politician, chairman of the union parishad.

== Death ==
Akanda died on 11 March 2006 from a heart attack.
