= Abul Kalam Azad (Gaibandha politician) =

Bangladeshi politician (born 1958)

Md. Abul Kalam Azad
- আবুল কালাম আজাদ

Member of the Bangladesh Parliament for Gaibandha-4
- In office 10 January 2024 – 6 August 2024
- Preceded by: Monowar Hossain Chowdhury
- Succeeded by: Shamim Kaisar Lincoln
- In office 29 January 2014 – 28 January 2019
- Preceded by: Monowar Hossain Chowdhury
- Succeeded by: Monowar Hossain Chowdhury

Personal details
- Born: 23 August 1958 (age 68)
- Party: Bangladesh Awami League
- Education: University of Rajshahi

Md. Abul Kalam Azad (born 23 August 1958) is a Bangladesh Awami League politician and a former Jatiya Sangsad member representing the Gaibandha-4 constituency.

== Early life ==
Azad was born on 23 August 1958. He completed his master's degree in geography from the University of Rajshahi.

== Career ==
Azad rendered his valuable services as the principal of Fulpukuria College for a long period. was elected to the parliament on 5 January 2014 from Gaibandha-4 as an independent candidate. In 2016 he was accused of being involved with attacks on the indigenous Santal community.
