= Gaibandha-4 =

Constituency of Bangladesh's Jatiya Sangsad

Coordinates: 25.14°N 89.39°E

- Constituency for the Jatiya Sangsad
- District: Gaibandha District
- Division: Rangpur Division
- Electorate: 468,384 (2026)

Current constituency
- Created: 1984
- Party: Bangladesh Nationalist Party
- Member: Shamim Kaisar Lincoln
- ← 31 Gaibandha-3 33 Gaibandha-5 →

Gaibandha-4 is a constituency represented in the Jatiya Sangsad (National Parliament) of Bangladesh since 2026 by Shamim Kaisar Lincoln of the Bangladesh Nationalist Party.

== Boundaries ==
The constituency encompasses Gobindaganj Upazila.

== History ==
The constituency was created in 1984 from a Rangpur constituency when the former Rangpur District was split into five districts: Nilphamari, Lalmonirhat, Rangpur, Kurigram, and Gaibandha.

== Members of Parliament ==
Election	Member	Party
1986	Lutfar Rahman Chowdhury	Jatiya Party
1988	Ataur Rahman	Independent
1991	Lutfar Rahman Chowdhury	Jatiya Party
Feb 1996	Abdul Mannan Mandal	Bangladesh Nationalist Party
Jun 1996	Lutfar Rahman Chowdhury	Jatiya Party
2001	Abdul Mottaleb Akanda	Bangladesh Nationalist Party
2006 by-election	Shamim Kaisar Lincoln	Bangladesh Nationalist Party
2008	Monowar Hossain Chowdhury	Awami League
2014	Abul Kalam Azad	Independent
2018	Monowar Hossain Chowdhury	Awami League
2024	Abul Kalam Azad	Awami League
2026	Shamim Kaisar Lincoln	Bangladesh Nationalist Party

== Elections ==
=== Elections in the 2020s ===
General Election 2026: Gaibandha-4
Party	Candidate	Votes	%	±%
BNP	Shamim Kaisar Lincoln	142,772	49.5	N/A
Jamaat	Md. Abdur Rahim Sarkar	139,738	48.5	N/A
JP(E)	Kazi Md. Mashiur Rahman	2,360	0.8	N/A
Independent	Md. Abdur Rouf Akand	1,552	0.5	N/A
IAB	Syed Touhidul Islam Tuhin	1,373	0.5	N/A
BRWP	Md. Atwarul Islam	368	0.1	N/A
Majority		3,034	1.1	N/A
Turnout		288,163	61.5	N/A
BNP gain from AL				

=== Elections in the 2010s ===
General Election 2014: Gaibandha-4
Party	Candidate	Votes	%	±%
Independent	Abul Kalam Azad	98,546	60.4	N/A
AL	Monowar Hossain Chowdhury	64,614	39.6	−12.5
Majority		33,932	20.8	−6.1
Turnout		163,160	46.3	−43.2
Independent gain from AL				

=== Elections in the 2000s ===
General Election 2008: Gaibandha-4
Party	Candidate	Votes	%	±%
AL	Monowar Hossain Chowdhury	145,201	52.1	
Jamaat	Abdur Rahim Sarkar	70,111	25.1	
JP(E)	Mohammad Ali Mahbub Talukdar	49,040	17.6	
Independent	Shamim Kaisar Lincoln	12,720	4.6	
Bangladesh Kalyan Party	Md. Mozibor Rahman	906	0.3	
LDP	Md. Abu Taleb Mondal	903	0.3	
Majority		75,090	26.9	
Turnout		278,881	89.5	
AL gain from BNP				

Abdul Mottaleb Akanda died in March 2006. Shamim Kaisar Lincoln of the BNP was elected in a May 2006 by-election.

General Election 2001: Gaibandha-4
Party	Candidate	Votes	%	±%
BNP	Abdul Mottaleb Akanda	96,108	41.0	+29.5
AL	Md. Mozammel Hossain Pradhan	75,106	32.0	+3.8
IJOF	Lutfar Rahman Chowdhury	63,296	27.0	N/A
Majority		21,002	9.0	−1.7
Turnout		234,510	80.5	+6.0
BNP gain from JP(E)				

=== Elections in the 1990s ===
General Election June 1996: Gaibandha-4
Party	Candidate	Votes	%	±%
JP(E)	Lutfar Rahman Chowdhury	67,419	38.9	+2.9
AL	Md. Tozammal Hossain Prodhan	48,919	28.2	+11.3
Jamaat	A. K. Afaz Uddin Ahmed	25,278	14.6	−7.9
BNP	Md. Abdul Mannan Mondal	19,860	11.5	+5.3
Independent	Md. Mazibur Rahman	4,272	2.5	N/A
JSD	Abul Kalam Azad	3,720	2.1	+0.2
Independent	Ferdaus Alam	1,225	0.7	N/A
Zaker Party	Enamul Kabir Torab	1,079	0.6	−0.9
Independent	Sheikh Sadek	427	0.2	N/A
Independent	Md. Majibur Rahman	407	0.2	N/A
Jatiya Samajtantrik Dal-JSD	Md. Abdus Samad	360	0.2	−0.3
Gano Forum	Md. Nurul Islam Sarkar	254	0.1	N/A
Majority		18,500	10.7	−2.7
Turnout		173,220	74.5	+19.1
JP(E) hold				

General Election 1991: Gaibandha-4
Party	Candidate	Votes	%	±%
JP(E)	Lutfar Rahman Chowdhury	44,784	36.0	
Jamaat	Afaz Uddin Ahmed	28,052	22.5	
AL	Shah Jahangir Kobir	21,006	16.9	
BNP	Sirajul Islam	7,724	6.2	
Independent	Jamalur Rahman Pradan	6,195	5.0	
Independent	Abdur Rahman	4,212	3.4	
JSD	Abul Kalam Azad	2,418	1.9	
Independent	Ataur Rahman	2,370	1.9	
Independent	Nurul Islam	2,088	1.7	
Zaker Party	Enamul Kabir Torab	1,895	1.5	
FP	Muklasur Rahman	894	0.7	
BAKSAL	Md. Abdur Razzak	874	0.7	
Jatia Mukti Dal	Mohammad Hossain Foku	794	0.6	
Jatiya Samajtantrik Dal-JSD	Entazur Rahman	583	0.5	
NAP (Muzaffar)	Md. Nurul Islam	338	0.3	
JSD (S)	Khalilur Rahman	205	0.2	
NDP	Khandakar Abu Taher	56	0.0	
Majority		16,732	13.4	
Turnout		124,488	55.4	
JP(E) gain from				
