= Gobindaganj Multilateral High School =

School in Bangladesh

Gobindaganj Government High School (GGHS) is a secondary school in Rangpur Division, Bangladesh. It stands on the central town area of Gobindaganj, Gobindaganj Upazila, Gaibandha District. It was established in 1912.

EIIN: 121195

== History ==
Gobindaganj Government High School (GGHS) was most likely established in 1884 as Gobindaganj Middle School (ME School) under the greater district of Rangpur, Subdivision: Gaibandha, P.S: Gobindaganj, Mauja: Buzruk Boalia. It is located in the heart of Golapbag Bandar, on the western side of the Dhaka-Rangpur Highway. At that time, the Jamindar of Babanpur, Mr. S. N. Roy Chudhury, established the school. In 1912, it was recognized as a Higher Secondary (H.S) School under Kolkata University. Jamindar Mr. Proddut Kumar Tagore of Sundarganj donated 1.59 acres of land for the school. Later, an additional 2.10 acres of land was purchased by the school authority, bringing the total land area to 3.69 acres, where the main school building is situated. Additionally, 2.35 acres of land were purchased on the north-east side of Gobindaganj Women's College, located beside the Rangpur-Dhaka Highway.

The school building was constructed as a one-story pucca building in 1940. In recognition of its contributions, the government declared it a Model School. The school also has a semi-pucca hostel with 74 seats.

In 1966, the Science group was introduced, and in 1968, with the introduction of the Agriculture group, the school was renamed Gobindaganj Bahumukhi (M.L) High School. In 1969, the Board selected the school as an S.S.C. Examination Center. Since its establishment, the results of the Entrance, Matriculation, and S.S.C. exams have been highly satisfactory. In some years, the results reached 100%, with some students placing in the merit list (1–20) under the Dhaka and Rajshahi Boards. The school is one of the oldest educational institutions in Bangladesh.

Over the years, students of the school have actively participated in social and national activities. Notable alumni include the first Speaker of the Bangladesh National Assembly, Late Shah Abdul Hamid; the Army Chief of India, Late J.N. Roy Chowdhary; and the famous agriculturist Mr. Kaji Badruddoza. Many alumni have pursued successful careers as doctors, engineers, university teachers, judges, army officers, police officers, and businessmen. Some former students also served as freedom fighters.

Headmasters:

1. Mr. Shital Kumar Majumder (1912–1928)

2. Mr. Khirod Lal Chowdhary (1928–1948)

3. Mr. Mohammad Ali (1948–1973)

4. Mr. Wazed Ali Khandker (1973–1991)

5. Mr. Abdur Rashid Akand (1991–2001)

6. Mr. A.B.M Kamrul Hoda (2003–2019)

7. Mr. Mokarram Hossain (Incharge) (2019–2020)

8. Mst. Rumila Yasmin Sathi (2020–2024)

9. Mr. Mokarram Hossain (2024–Present)

---
