= Dhaperhat Union =

Coordinates: 25.3452°N 89.3427°E

Dhaperhat Union is a union parishad under Sadullapur Upazila of Gaibandha District, Bangladesh. According to the 2011 Bangladesh census, Dhaperhat Union had 7,695 households and a population of 30,597. The union is a major producer of turmeric.
