= Gaibandha Sadar Upazila =

Gaibandha Sadar গাইবান্ধা সদর
- Upazila
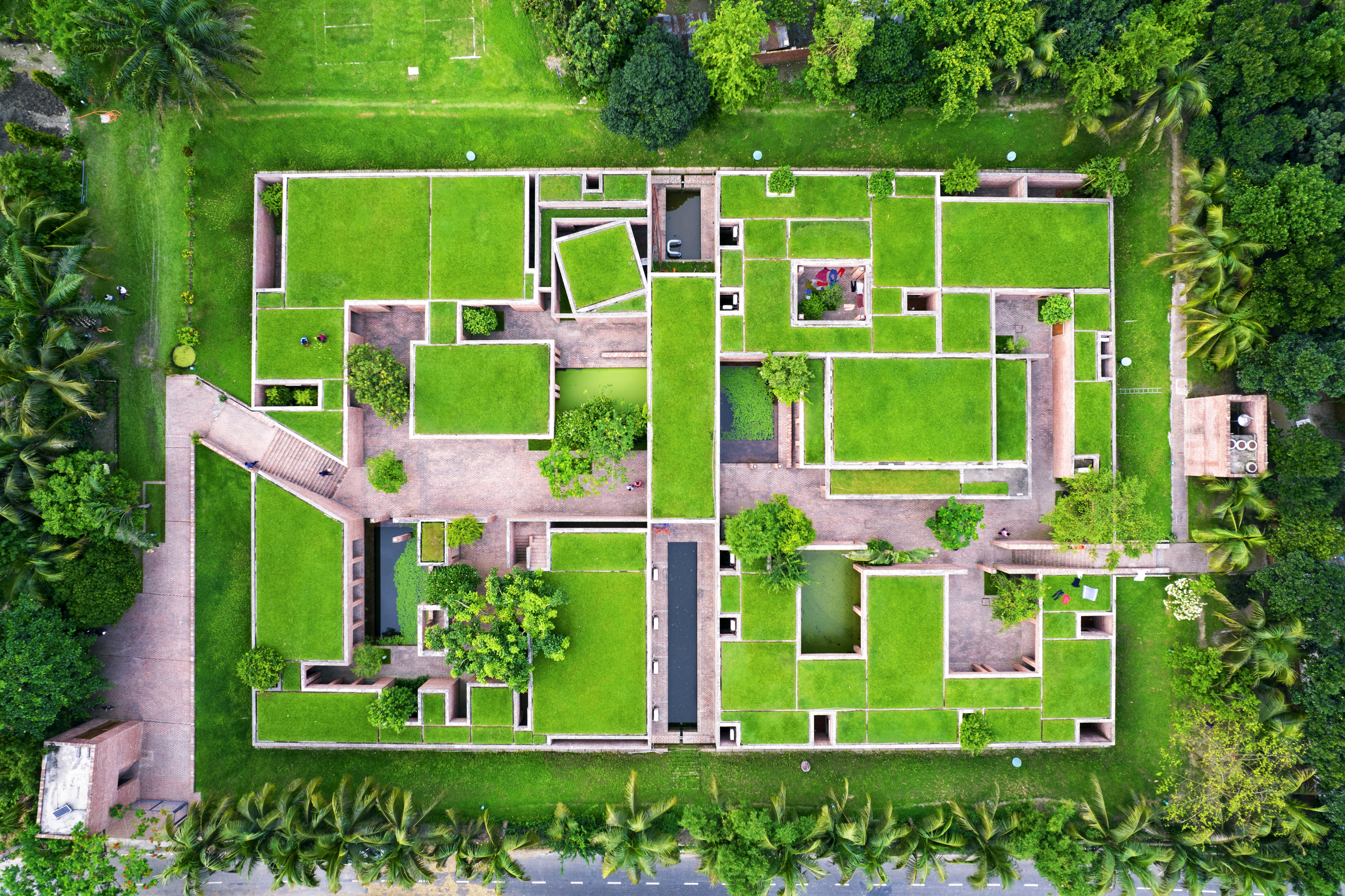
- Friendship Center Gaibandha

- Coordinates: 25°19.5′N 89°37.7′E
- Country: Bangladesh
- Division: Rangpur
- District: Gaibandha
- Headquarters: Gaibandha

Area
  - Total: 324.05 km^{2} (125.12 sq mi)

Population (2022)
  - Total: 499,196
  - Density: 1,540.5/km^{2} (3,989.9/sq mi)
- Time zone: UTC+6 (BST)
- Postal code: 5700
- Area code: 0541
- Website: Official Map of Gaibandha Sadar

Gaibandha Sadar Upazila mauza geocode map

Gaibandha Sadar (Bengali: গাইবান্ধা সদর) is an upazila of Gaibandha District in Rangpur Division, Bangladesh.

== Geography ==
Gaibandha Sadar is located at 25.3250°N 89.6278°E. It has 109,628 households and a total area of 324.05 km^{2}.

== Demographics ==
Religions in Gaibandha Sadar Upazila (2022)
Religion	Percent
Islam	92.85%
Hinduism	7.13%
Other or not stated	0.02%

According to the 2022 Bangladeshi census, Gaibandha Sadar Upazila had 131,599 households and a population of 499,196. 9.73% of the population were under 5 years of age. Gaibandha Sadar had a literacy rate (age 7 and over) of 70.30%: 73.10% for males and 67.72% for females, and a sex ratio of 93.25 males for every 100 females. 131,891 (26.42%) lived in urban areas.

According to the 2011 Census of Bangladesh, Gaibandha Sadar Upazila had 109,628 households and a population of 437,268. 105,798 (24.20%) were under 10 years of age. Gaibandha Sadar had a literacy rate (age 7 and over) of 47.50%, compared to the national average of 51.8%, and a sex ratio of 1,045 females per 1,000 males. 94,089 (21.52%) lived in urban areas.

According to the 1991 Bangladesh census, Gaibandha Sadar had a population of 359,226, of whom 172,249 were aged 18 or over. Males constituted 50.6% of the population, and females 49.4%. Gaibandha Sadar had an average literacy rate of 28.2% (7+ years), against the national average of 32.4% .

== Administration ==
Gaibandha Sadar Upazila is divided into Gaibandha Municipality and 13 union parishads: Badiakhali, Ballamjhar, Boali, Ghagoa, Gidari, Kamarjani, Kholahati, Kuptola, Laxmipur, Malibari, Mollarchar, Ramchandrapur, and Shahapara. The union parishads are subdivided into 130 mauzas and 144 villages.

Gaibandha Municipality is subdivided into 9 wards and 35 mahallas.

== Education ==
According to Banglapedia, Gaibandha Government Boys' High School, founded in 1885, is a notable secondary school.

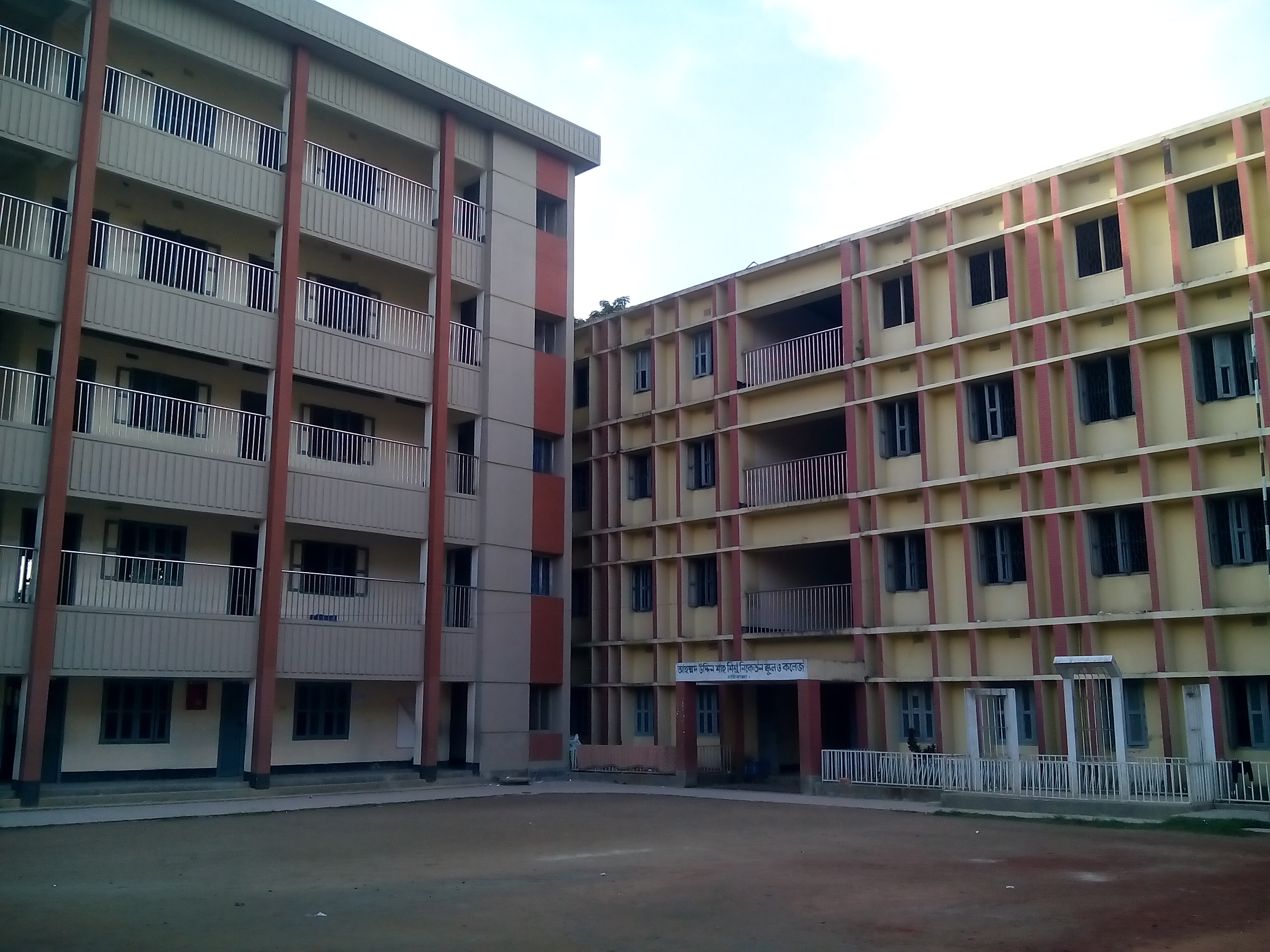
Ahammad Uddin Shah Shishu Niketon School & College started as a kindergarten in 1982.

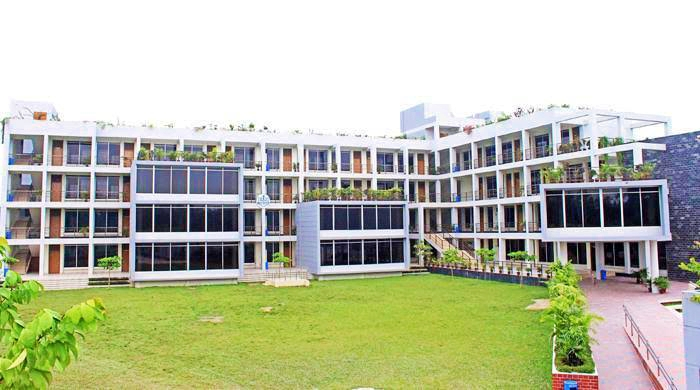
SKS School & College in Ramchandrapur Union inaugurated its academic activities in 2017.

== See also ==
- Administrative geography of Bangladesh
- Upazila
- Upazila Nirbahi Officer
- Districts of Bangladesh
- Divisions of Bangladesh
