= Sadullapur Upazila =

KHONIKER NIBASH

Sadullapur সাদুল্লাপুর
- Upazila
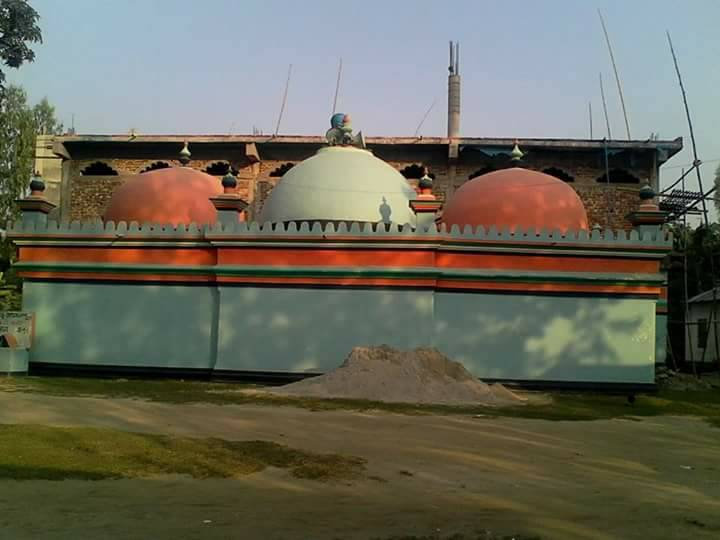
- Jamalpur Shahi Mosque

- Coordinates: 25°23′N 89°28′E
- Country: Bangladesh
- Division: Rangpur
- District: Gaibandha

Area
  - Total: 230.12 km^{2} (88.85 sq mi)

Population (2022)
  - Total: 313,628
  - Density: 1,362.9/km^{2} (3,529.9/sq mi)
- Time zone: UTC+6 (BST)
- Postal code: 5710
- Website: Official Map of Sadullapur

Sadullapur Upazila mauza geocode map

Sadullapur (Bengali: সাদুল্লাপুর) is an upazila of Gaibandha District in the Division of Rangpur, Bangladesh.

== Geography ==
Sadullapur is located at 25.3833°N 89.4667°E. It has 75,235 homes and a total area of 230.12 km^{2}.

== Demographics ==
Religions in Sadullapur Upazila (2022)
Religion	Percent
Islam	91.60%
Hinduism	8.37%
Other or not stated	0.03%

According to the 2022 Bangladeshi census, Sadullapur Upazila had 88,018 households and a population of 313,628. 9.33% of the population were under 5 years of age. Sadullapur had a literacy rate (age 7 and over) of 66.87%: 70.10% for males and 63.89% for females, and a sex ratio of 93.86 males for every 100 females. 29,178 (9.30%) lived in urban areas.

According to the 2011 Census of Bangladesh, Sadullapur Upazila had 75,235 households and a population of 287,426. 67,631 (23.53%) were under 10 years of age. Sadullapur had a literacy rate (age 7 and over) of 44.07%, compared to the national average of 51.8%, and a sex ratio of 1047 females per 1000 males. 12,291 (4.28%) lived in urban areas.

As of the 1991 Bangladesh census, Sadullapur has a population of 243,012. Males constitute 50.4% of the population, and females 49.6%. The upazila's adult population, over 18 years, is 117,347. Sadullapur has an average literacy rate of 25.1% (7+ years), below the national average of 32.4%. The literacy rate of this upazila is 89.3.

== Administration ==
Sadullapur Upazila is divided into 11 union parishads: Bongram, Damodorpur, Dhaperhat, Faridpur, Idilpur, Jamalpur, Kamarpara, Khodkomor, Noldanga, Rasulpur, and Vatgram. The union parishads are subdivided into 166 mauzas and 169 villages.

== Notable people ==
- Maqbular Rahman Sarkar (1928–1985), academic and tenth vice-chancellor of Rajshahi University

== See also ==
- Dhaperhat Union
- Districts of Bangladesh
- Divisions of Bangladesh
- Upazilas of Bangladesh
