= Ahmed Hossain =

Indian politician (1896–1961)

Ahmed Hossain Mian
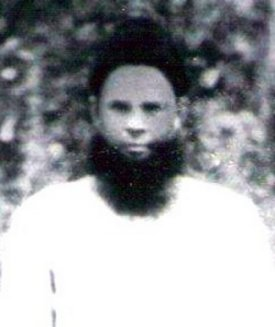
- Ahmed Hossain

Member of the Bengal Legislative Assembly
- In office 1937–1947
- Constituency: Gaibandha South

Personal details
- Born: 7 March 1896 Jalaltair, Gaibandha, Rangpur district, Bengal Presidency
- Died: May 19, 1961 (aged 65) East Pakistan
- Education: Sonatala High School
- Alma mater: Aligarh Muslim University

Ahmed Hossain (7 March 1896 – 19 May 1961), minister for agriculture, forest and fisheries department in Huseyn Shaheed Suhrawardy's cabinet 1946/47, chairman of Rangpur District Board (Undivided Bengal), minister for agriculture in East Pakistan in Abu Hossain Sarkar's cabinet 1955–56. Represented his Shagata and Fulchari constituency, of Gaibandha District as MLA and MP from 1937 to 1958.

== Early life ==
Ahmed Hossain was born in Jalaltair village, Mahimaganj, Rangpur district on 7 March 1896. Hossain passed his matriculation examination from Sonatola High School and obtained a law degree from the Aligarh Muslim University.

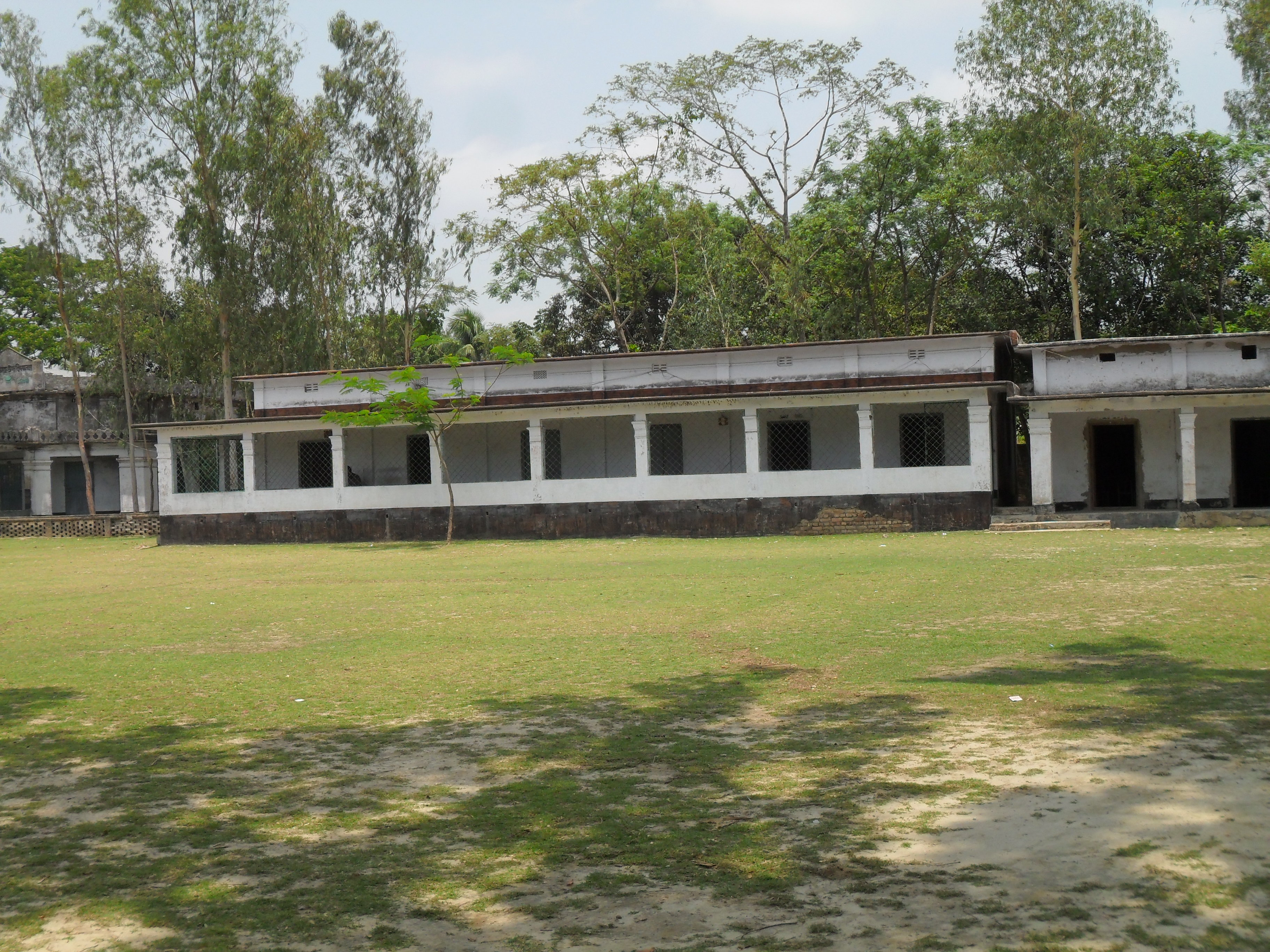
Mahimaganj High School built in 1946

== Independence movement ==
Hossain joined the All India Congress Party and was fully committed to Mahatma Gandhi's non-cooperation movement (1920), canvassing support for the Congress Agenda all over north Bengal, particularly in the Rangpur district. When the Muslim League was formed, he joined it and contested the 1937 general election as a Muslim League candidate and became an elected member of the Bengal Legislative Assembly.

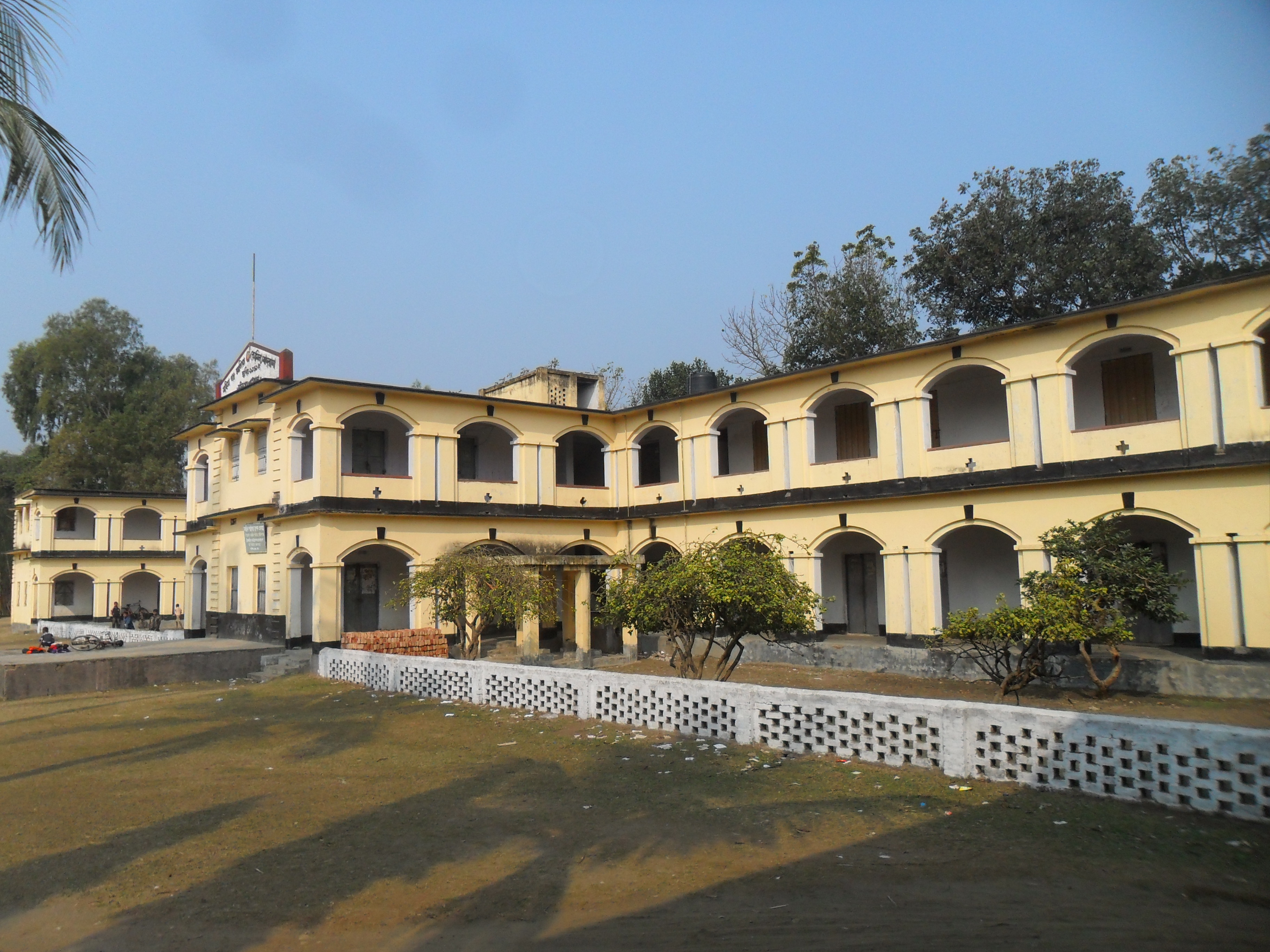
Mahimaganj Alia Kamil Madrasha built by Hossain in 1939

He ran in the Indian general election of 1946 as a Muslim League candidate and was re-elected as a member of the Bengal Legislative Assembly. He was given the ministerial post for the Agriculture, Forest and Fisheries department under the Chief Minister-ship of Huseyn Shaheed Suhrawardy. In 1947 Bengal was partitioned in the partition of Bengal along religious lines. The Muslim majority East Bengal joined with Pakistan. Khawaja Nazimuddin and Nurul Amin formed a Muslim government in Dhaka, East Pakistan. Hossain remained a Muslim League MLA.

During the 1952 language movement Hossain resigned from the Muslim League and joined the newly formed United Front Party led by Fazlul Huq, Maulana Bhashani and Hueyn Shaheed Suhrawardy. In 1954, Hossain was elected to the East Pakistan national assembly as a United Front Member.

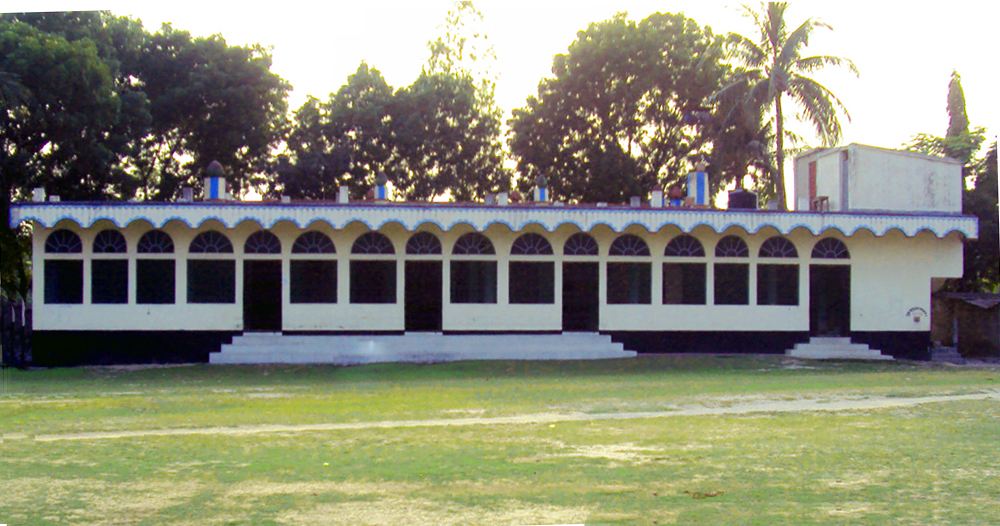
Mahimaganj Madrasha Mosque in 1945

Hossain was a philanthropist and interested in promoting Muslim education in Rangpur. He established an Alia Madrasa at Mahimaganj in 1939, which was particularly significant as at the time there were only three other Alia madras in the whole of undivided Bengal. A newly built student hall, the "Ahmed Hossain Student Hall" has been dedicated in his honour. Hossain was also responsible for building a high school and a mosque in Mahimaganj in 1939 and 1945 respectively. In 1950 Hossain introduced laws against catching fish eggs, small and spawning fish to provide for the conservation and development of propagation of fish stock. Hossain continued to represent his constituency as an MP until Ayub Khan declared Martial Law in Pakistan in 1958.

== Death ==
Hossain died at the age of 65 on Friday 19 May 1961.
