= Palashbari Upazila =

Palashbari পলাশবাড়ী
- Upazila
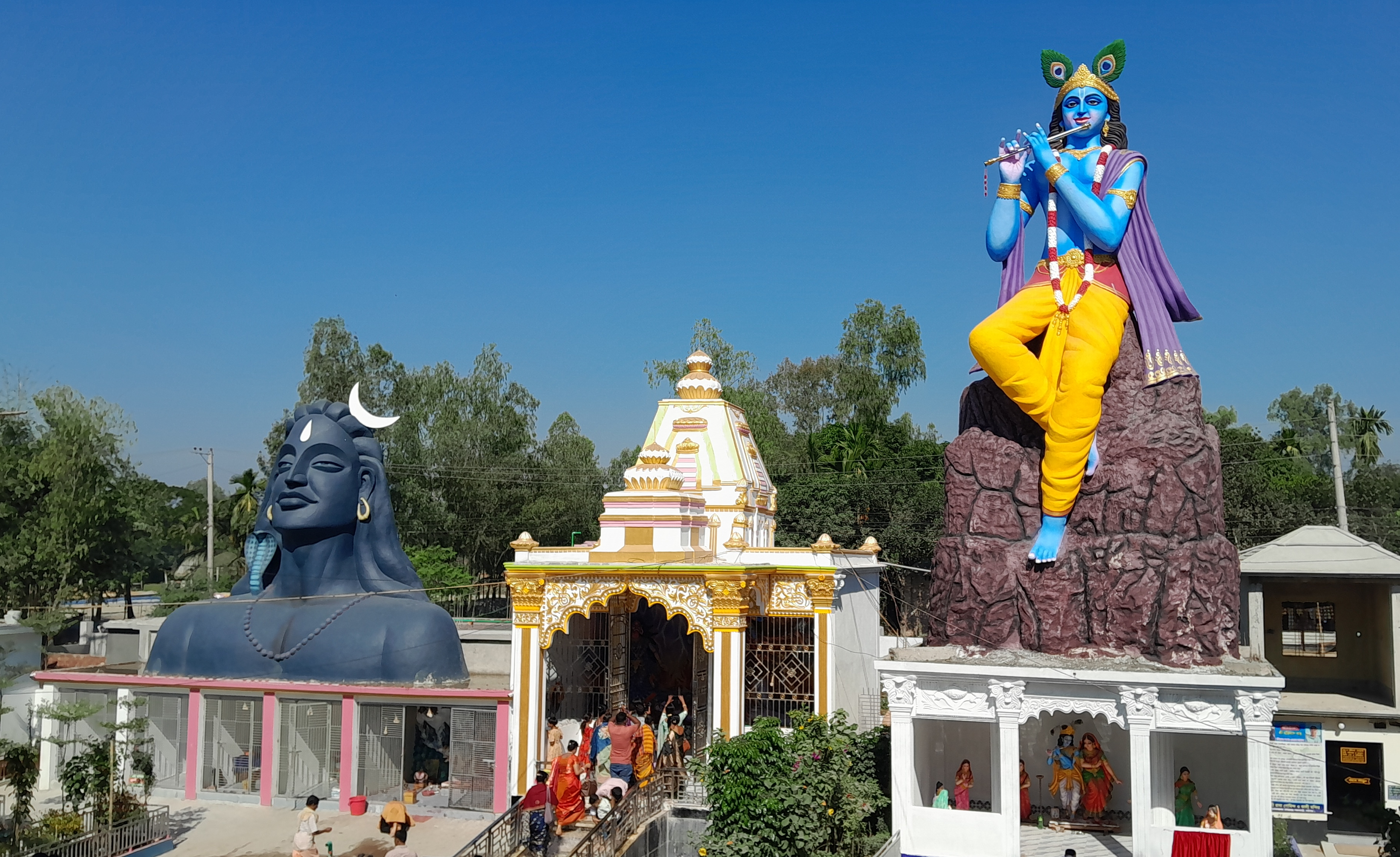
- Sri Sri Radha Govinda and Kali Temple, Palashbari

- Coordinates: 25°17′N 89°21′E
- Country: Bangladesh
- Division: Rangpur
- District: Gaibandha

Area
  - Total: 185.24 km^{2} (71.52 sq mi)

Population (2022)
  - Total: 267,438
  - Density: 1,443.7/km^{2} (3,739.3/sq mi)
- Time zone: UTC+6 (BST)
- Postal code: 5730
- Area code: 05424
- Website: Official Map of Palashbari

Palashbari Upazila mauza geocode map

Palashbari (Bengali: পলাশবাড়ী) is an upazila of Gaibandha District in the Division of Rangpur, Bangladesh.

== Geography ==
Palashbari Upazila is located at 25.2833°N 89.3500°E. It has a total area of 185.24 km^{2}.

== Demographics ==
Religions in Palashbari Upazila (2022)
Religion	Percent
Islam	93.76%
Hinduism	6.23%
Other or not stated	0.01%

According to the 2022 Bangladeshi census, Palashbari Upazila had 73,267 households and a population of 267,438. 9.96% of the population were under 5 years of age. Palashbari had a literacy rate (age 7 and over) of 69.77%: 73.37% for males and 66.52% for females, and a sex ratio of 91.96 males for every 100 females. 57,518 (21.51%) lived in urban areas.

According to the 2011 Census of Bangladesh, Palashbari Upazila had 63,307 households and a population of 244,792. 59,878 (24.46%) were under 10 years of age. Palashbari had a literacy rate (age 7 and over) of 47.62%, compared to the national average of 51.8%, and a sex ratio of 1040 females per 1000 males. 22,659 (9.26%) lived in urban areas.

As of the 1991 Bangladesh census, Palashbari Upazila has a population of 210806. Males constitute 50.54% of the population, and females 49.46%. This Upazila's eighteen up population is 102892. Palashbari Upazila has an average literacy rate of 26.4% (7+ years), and the national average of 32.4% literate.

== Administration ==
Palashbari Upazila is divided into Palashbari Municipality and eight union parishads: Barisal, Betkapa, Harinathpur, Hossainpur, Kishoregari, Mohdipur, Monohorpur and Pobnapur. The union parishads are subdivided into 161 mauzas and 160 villages.

Palashbari Municipality is subdivided into 8 wards and 24 mahallas.

== Education ==
According to Banglapedia, Palashbari S.M. Pilot High School, founded in 1911, is a notable secondary school. Founded in 1964, Palashbari Government College is one of the first government co-education colleges of this region.

== Notable people ==
- TIM Fazle Rabbi Chowdhury, politician and six-time MP

== See also ==
- Upazilas of Bangladesh
- Districts of Bangladesh
- Divisions of Bangladesh
