= Palashbari S.M. Pilot High School =

Secondary school in Gaibandha, Bangladesh

Palashbari Suti Mahmud Model Pilot Government High School
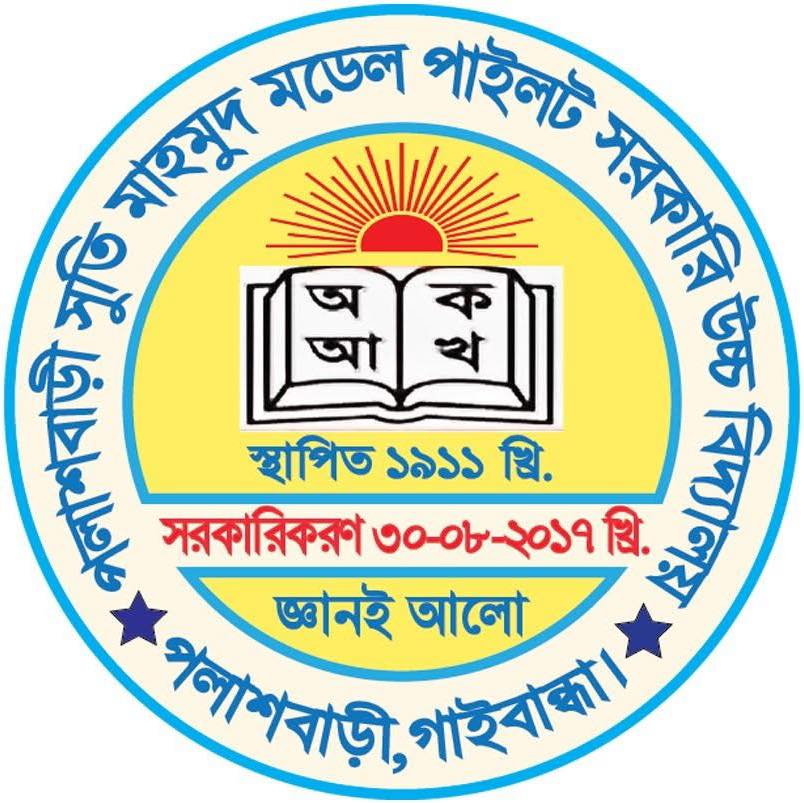
- Institute logo

Location
- Dhaka-Rangpur Highway; Palashbari Upazila, Gaibandha District; Bangladesh; 25.2817°N 89.3519°E

Information
- School type: Secondary School
- Motto: Knowledge is light
- Established: 1911; 115 years ago (Nationalized in 2017)
- School board: Board of Intermediate and Secondary Education, Dinajpur
- Principal: Abdul Bari Sarkar (Acting)
- Grades: 6th-10th
- Gender: Co-educational
- Age: 11 to 16
- Language: Bengali
- Campus type: Suburban
- Colours: Boys: White & Khaki: Girls: Blue & White
- EIIN: 121358
- Website: psmpghs.edu.bd

Palashbari S.M. (Suti Mahmud) Model Pilot Government High School known as (PSMMPGHS).Located in the Palashbari Upazila of Gaibandha District, is one of the oldest and most prestigious educational institutions in the district.Established in 1911.The institution has been following the co-educational system since its inception to the present,where both boys and girls can pursue their education.In recognition of its long-standing academic excellence and significant contributions to society, the Government of Bangladesh nationalized the school in 2017.

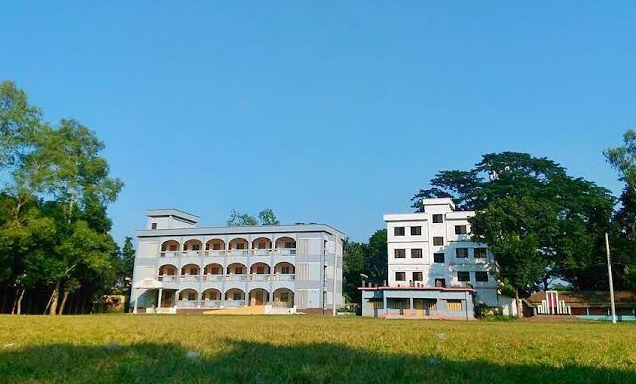
PSMMPGHS (Model building)

== History ==
Palashbari Suti Mahmud (S.M.) Model Pilot Government High School, located in the Palashbari Upazila headquarters of Gaibandha district, is one of the oldest and most traditional educational institutions in this region. The school was established in 1911 through the special initiative of Suti Mahmud, a local education enthusiast and philanthropist, along with the cooperation of other education-loving people in the area. Suti Mahmud donated the necessary land for the establishment of the school, and the institution was named after him. Initially, it began its journey as a Middle English (M.E.) school and was later converted into a high school. After being managed as a private educational institution for a long time, the Government of the People's Republic of Bangladesh nationalized the school in 2017. Currently, it is known as an important government secondary school in the Subdistrict, continues to serve as a beacon of knowledge in the region through its high quality of instruction and disciplined academic environment.
