= Shah Jahangir Kabir =

Bangladeshi politician

Member of Parliament for Rangpur-21
- In office 1973–1976
- Succeeded by: Rustam Ali

Personal details
- Party: Awami League

Shah Jahangir Kabir (1935 – 9 June 2013) was an Awami League politician and a member of parliament for Rangpur-21.

== Career ==
Kabir was elected to parliament from Rangpur-21 as an Awami League candidate in 1973.

== Death ==
Kabir died on 9 June 2013 at Rangpur Medical College.
