= Monowar Hossain Chowdhury =

Bangladeshi politician (1948–2026)

Monuwar Hussain Chowdhury
- মনোয়ার হোসেন চৌধুরী

Member of the Bangladesh Parliament for Gaibandha-4
- In office 30 January 2019 – 2 November 2023
- In office 25 January 2009 – 4 January 2014

Personal details
- Born: 16 March 1948
- Died: 8 September 2026 (aged 78) Dhaka, Bangladesh
- Party: Awami League
- Education: BUET (BSc)
- Occupation: Politician

Monowar Hossain Chowdhury (16 March 1948 – 8 September 2026) was a Bangladeshi Awami League politician who was a two-term member of the Jatiya Sangsad from the Gaibandha-4 constituency.

== Early life and career ==
Chowdhury was born on 16 March 1948. He participated in the 2008 and 2014 elections as an Awami League candidate. He was elected to represent Gaibandha-4 in 2008 but failed in 2014. He was chief engineer of the Local Government Engineering Department (LGED). He was elected to parliament from Gaibandha-4 as an Awami League candidate on 30 December 2018.

== Death ==
Chowdhury died of a heart attack on 8 September 2026, while undergoing treatment at Square Hospital in Dhaka. He was 78. His death was confirmed by his brother, Jewel Chowdhury.
