= Gaibandha Government Boys' High School =

Location
- Gaibandha; 5700; Bangladesh; 25.25°N 89.50°E

Information
- Type: Secondary school
- Established: 1885 (Became public in 1968)
- School district: Gaibandha
- School code: 121101
- Principal: Sushant Kumar Dev
- Grades: 6-10
- Gender: Boys
- Enrollment: 1,200
- Language: Bengali
- Campus type: Urban
- Sports: Football, cricket, volleyball
- Website: ggbhs.edu.bd

Gaibandha Government Boys' High School is a secondary school located in Gaibandha, Bangladesh. It is one of the oldest schools of Bangladesh, established in 1885 and became public in 1968. Although it was set up for children of surrounding areas, students now come from most parts of Bangladesh. The school is under the direct control of the Ministry of Education.
