= Saghata Upazila =

Saghata সাঘাটা
- Upazila
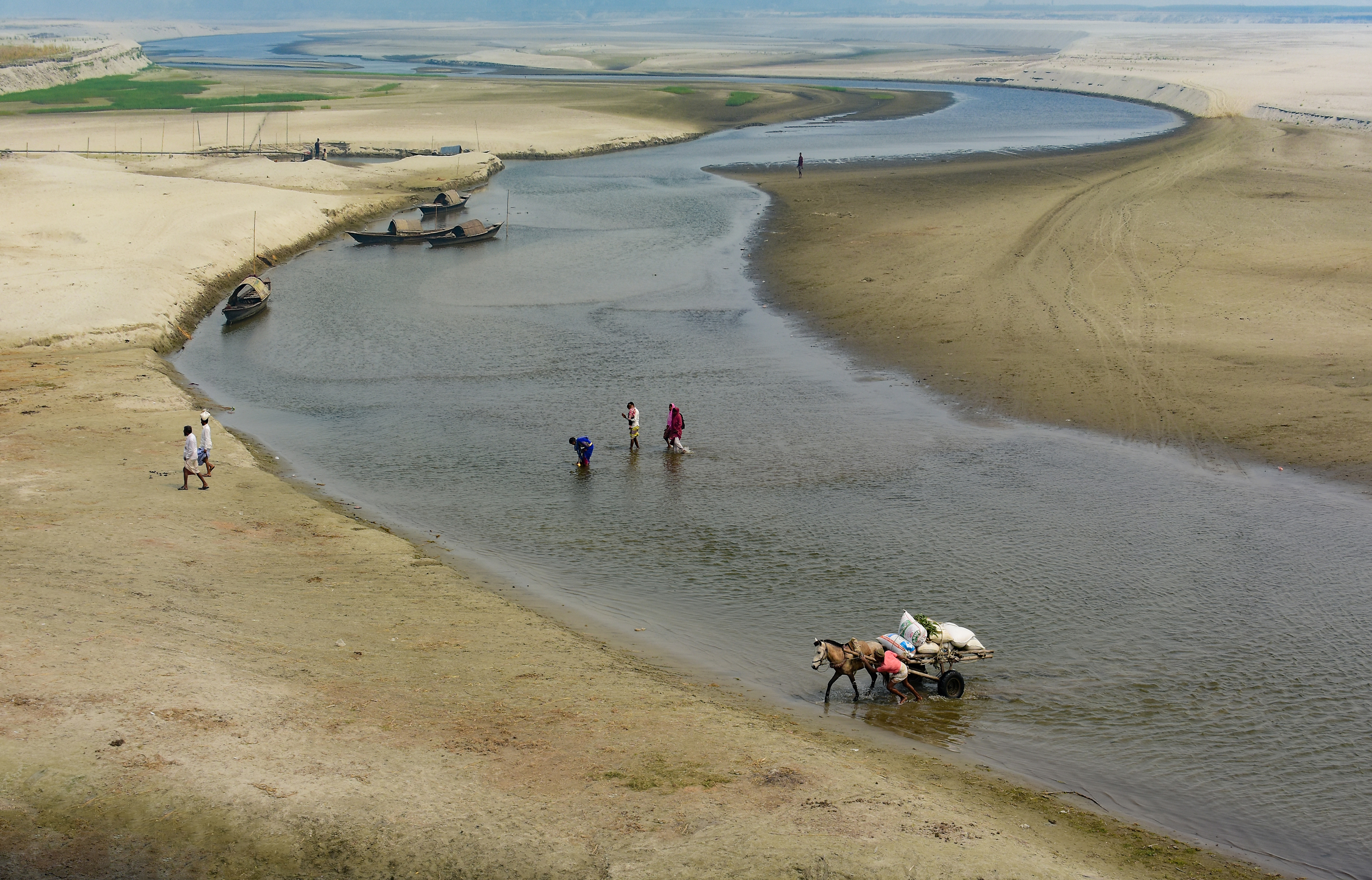
- View of Saghata

- Coordinates: 25°6.3′N 89°35.2′E
- Country: Bangladesh
- Division: Rangpur
- District: Gaibandha

Area
  - Total: 231.02 km^{2} (89.20 sq mi)

Population (2022)
  - Total: 289,628
  - Density: 1,253.7/km^{2} (3,247.0/sq mi)
- Time zone: UTC+6 (BST)
- Postal code: 5750
- Area code: 05426
- Website: Official Map of Saghata

Saghata (Bengali: সাঘাটা) is an upazila of Gaibandha District in the Division of Rangpur, Bangladesh.

== Geography ==
Saghata is located at Rangpur division 25.1056°N 89.5861°E. It has 68,954 households and total area 231.02 km^{2}.

== Demographics ==
Religions in Saghata Upazila (2022)
Religion	Percent
Islam	93.32%
Hinduism	6.67%
Other or not stated	0.01%

According to the 2022 Bangladeshi census, Saghata Upazila had 79,700 households and a population of 289,628. 10.11% of the population were under 5 years of age. Saghata had a literacy rate (age 7 and over) of 66.08%: 69.97% for males and 62.62% for females, and a sex ratio of 91.27 males for every 100 females. 23,787 (8.21%) lived in urban areas.

According to the 2011 Census of Bangladesh, Saghata Upazila had 68,954 households and a population of 267,819. Of this population, 66,649 (24.89%) were under 10 years of age. Saghata had a literacy rate of 40.59% (for individuals aged 7 and over), which is below the national average of 51.8%. The sex ratio was 1,051 females per 1,000 males. A total of 15,883 (5.93%) people lived in urban areas.

As per the 1991 Bangladesh Census, Saghata had a population of 232,118. Males constituted 50.73% of the population, while females made up 49.27%. The population of Saghata’s rural areas was 105,508. The average literacy rate for this Upazila was 22.1% (for individuals aged 7 and over), compared to the national average of 32.4%.

== Administration ==
Saghata Upazila is divided into ten union parishads: Bonarpara, Ghuridah, Holdia, Jumarbari, Kachua, Kamalerpara, Muktinagar, Padumsahar, Saghata, and Varotkhali. The union parishads are subdivided into 117 mauzas and 130 villages.

== Notable residents ==
1. Ahmed Hossain -Ex. Minister of Undivided Bengal.
2. Advocate Fazle Rabbi Miah -EX MP, EX Deputy speaker.
3. Dr. Mizanur Rahman -Ex. Chairman of Human rights Commission
4. Mahmud Hasan Ripon -Ex. President of Bangladesh Chattra League, EX MP
5. Shishir Kumar Shaha (Opu) -Cultural Activist, Announcer-Bangladesh Betar

== See also ==
- Upazilas of Bangladesh
- Districts of Bangladesh
- Divisions of Bangladesh
