= Phulchhari Upazila =

Fulchhari ফুলছড়ি
- Upazila
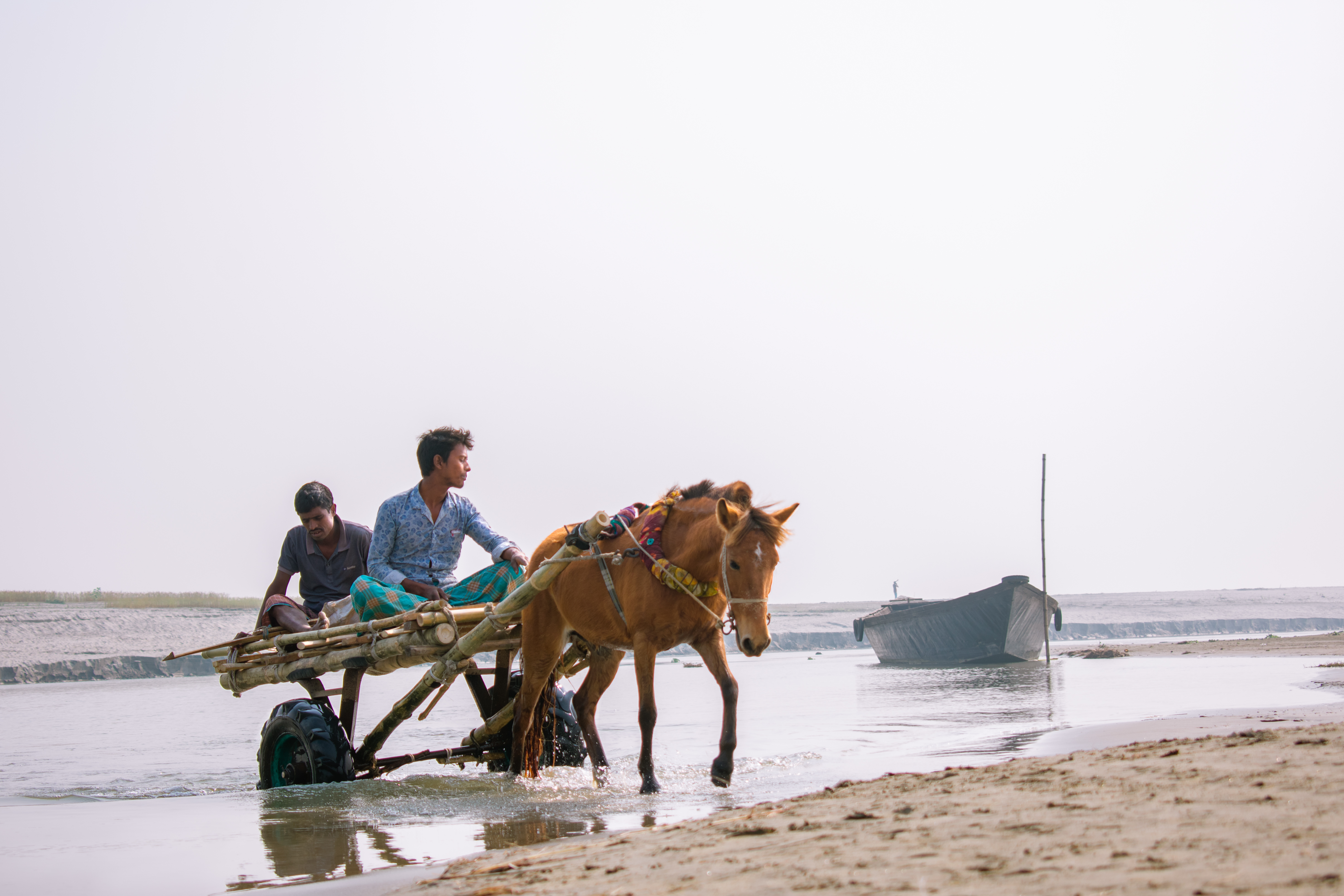
- Balasighat

- Coordinates: 25°11.5′N 89°37′E
- Country: Bangladesh
- Division: Rangpur
- District: Gaibandha

Area
  - Total: 314.03 km^{2} (121.25 sq mi)

Population (2022)
  - Total: 166,662
  - Density: 530.72/km^{2} (1,374.6/sq mi)
- Time zone: UTC+6 (BST)
- Postal code: 5760
- Website: Official Map of Phulchhari

Phulchhari Upazila mauza geocode map

Phulchhari or Fulchhari (Bengali: ফুলছড়ি) is an upazila of Gaibandha District in the Division of Rangpur, Bangladesh.

== Geography ==
Phulchhari is located at 25.1917°N 89.6167°E. It has 40,489 households and total area 314.03 km^{2}.

== Demographics ==
Religions in Phulchhari Upazila (2022)
Religion	Percent
Islam	96.37%
Hinduism	3.60%
Other or not stated	0.03%

According to the 2022 Bangladeshi census, Fulchhari Upazila had 44,910 households and a population of 166,662. 11.45% of the population were under 5 years of age. Fulchhari had a literacy rate (age 7 and over) of 59.99%: 62.79% for males and 57.30% for females, and a sex ratio of 97.20 males for every 100 females. 25,102 (15.06%) lived in urban areas.

According to the 2011 Census of Bangladesh, Phulchhari Upazila had 40,489 households and a population of 165,334. 46,512 (28.13%) were under 10 years of age. Phulchhari had a literacy rate (age 7 and over) of 31.25%, compared to the national average of 51.8%, and a sex ratio of 1003 females per 1000 males. 6,401 (3.87%) lived in urban areas.

As of the 1991 Bangladesh census, Phulchhari has a population of 128845. Males constitute 50.82% of the population, and females 49.18%. This Upazila's eighteen up population is 54806. Phulchhari has an average literacy rate of 16.5% (7+ years), and the national average of 32.4% literate.

== Administration ==
Phulchhari Upazila is divided into seven union parishads: Erendabari, Fazlupur, Phulchari, Gazaria, Kanchipara, Udakhali, and Uria. The union parishads are subdivided into 80 mauzas and 85 villages.

== See also ==
- Upazilas of Bangladesh
- Districts of Bangladesh
- Divisions of Bangladesh
