= Sundarganj Upazila =

Sundarganj সুন্দরগঞ্জ
- Upazila
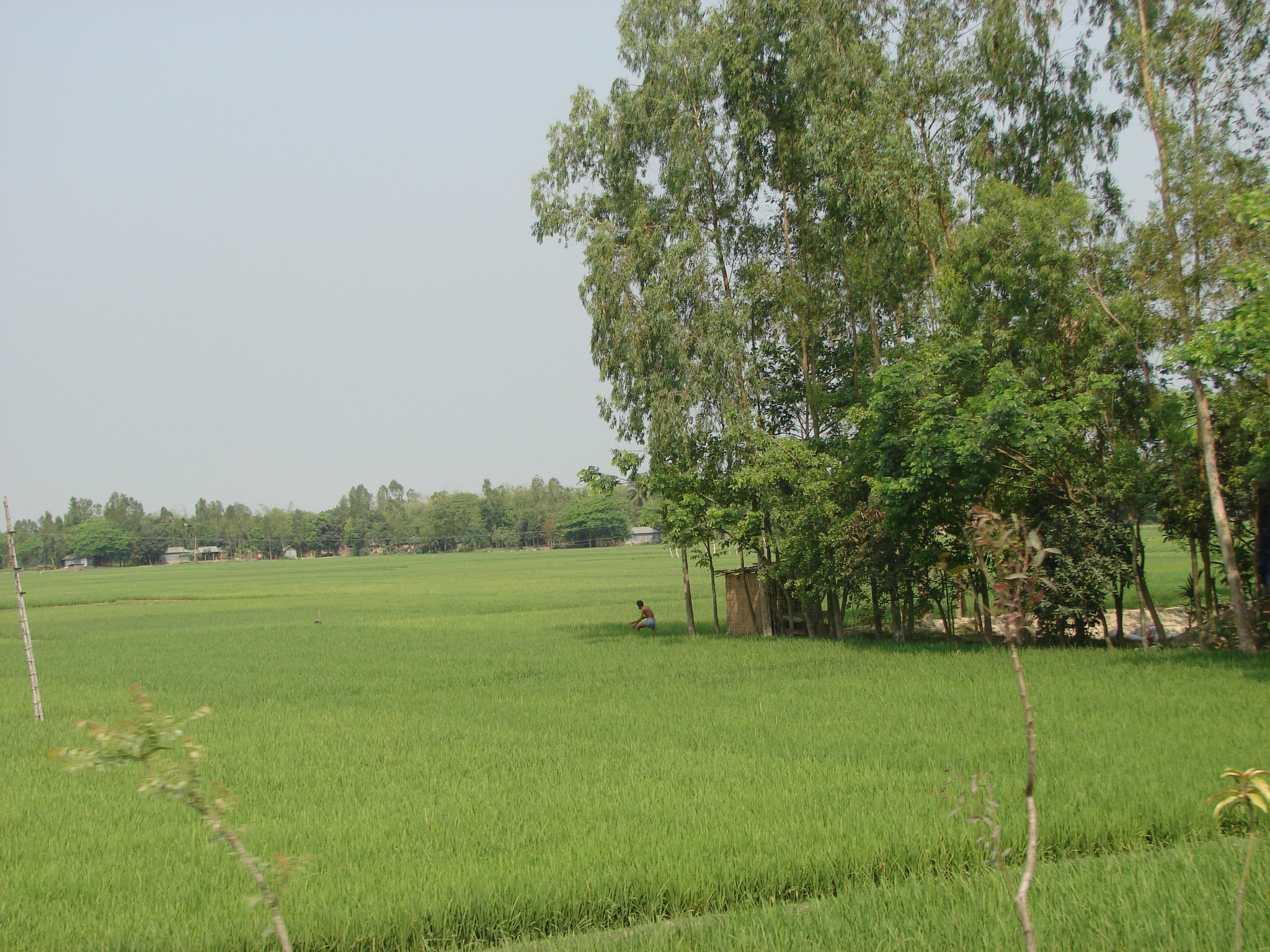
- Fields in Chandipur village

- Coordinates: 25°33.5′N 89°30′E
- Country: Bangladesh
- Division: Rangpur
- District: Gaibandha

Area
  - Total: 369.85 km^{2} (142.80 sq mi)

Population (2022)
  - Total: 482,537
  - Density: 1,304.7/km^{2} (3,379.1/sq mi)
- Time zone: UTC+6 (BST)
- Postal code: 5720
- Website: www.bangladesh.gov.bd/maps/images/gaibandha/Sundarganj.gif

Sundarganj Upazila mauza geocode map

Sundarganj (Bengali: সুন্দরগঞ্জ) is an upazila of Gaibandha District in the division of Rangpur, Bangladesh.

== Geography ==
Sundarganj is on the banks of the river Teesta. It had an area of 369.85 square kilometres (142.80 square miles)

== Demographics ==
Religions in Sundarganj Upazila (2022)
Religion	Percent
Islam	91.61%
Hinduism	8.37%
Other or not stated	0.02%

According to the 2022 Bangladeshi census, Sundarganj Upazila had 132,780 households and a population of 482,537. 9.60% of the population were under 5 years of age. Sundarganj had a literacy rate (age 7 and over) of 64.81%: 68.32% for males and 61.57% for females, and a sex ratio of 93.70 males for every 100 females. 59,592 (12.35%) lived in urban areas.

According to the 2011 Census of Bangladesh, Sundarganj Upazila had 122,098 households and a population of 461,920. 115,339 (24.97%) were under 10 years of age. Sundarganj had a literacy rate (age 7 and over) of 40.56%, compared to the national average of 51.8%, and a sex ratio of 1043 females per 1000 males. 20,786 (4.50%) lived in urban areas.

Sundarganj has a population of 4,61,920 (2011 census). It has 70165 households. Males comprise 2,26,118 of the population, and females 2,35,802. The population density is 572.23. Sundarganj has an average education rate of 78.13%.

== Administration ==
Sundarganj Upazila is divided into Sundarganj Municipality and 15 union parishads: Bamondanga, Belka, Chandipur, Chaporhati, Dohbond, Dhopadanga, Haripur, Konchibari, Kapasia, Ramjibon, Shantiram, Sorbanondo, Sonaroy, Sreepur, and Tarapur. The union parishads are subdivided into 110 mauzas and 189 villages.

Sundarganj Municipality is subdivided into 9 wards and 17 mahallas.

== Colleges ==
- Sundarganj D.W Govt. College (Sundarganj)
- Sundarganj Degree Women's College (Sundarganj)
- Belka Degree College (Belka, Sundarganj)
- Dharmapur Abdul Jabbar Degree College (Dharmapur, Sundarganj)
- Dharmapur Women's College (Dharmapur, Sundarganj)
- Dhubni Mohila College (Dhubni, Sundarganj)
- Shobhaganj Degree College (Shobhaganj, Sundarganj)
- Shobhaganj Women's Model College (Shobhaganj, Sundarganj)
- Bamandanga Abdul Haque College ( Bamandanga, Sundarganj)
- Dhubni Kanchibari College (Dhubni, Sundarganj)
- Ramdeb Shaikh Khabir Uddin College (Ramdeb, Sundarganj)
- Bazarpara College (Bazarpara, Sundarganj)

== Health centers ==
- Sundarganj Upazila Health Complex (Sundarganj)
- Bamdanga sub-health center (Bamandanga)
- Shobhaganj Sub-Health Center (Chaparhatti)
- Belka Sub-Health Center (Belka)
- Kanchibari Sub-Health Center (Kanchibari)
- Haripur sub-health center (Haripur)
- Chandipur sub-health center (Chandipur)
- Dharmapur Sub-Health Center (Dharmapur)

== High schools ==
- Sundargonj Abdul Majid Govt. Boys High School
- Sundarganj Amina Govt. Girls High School
- Sundarganj Abdul Mazid Mondal High School
- Sibram Alhaj md. Hossain srity school and college
- Shibram School And College
- Teani Moniram High School
- Ramjiban High School
- Bazar Para High School
- Fazlul Haque High School
- Shovagonj High School
- Belka M C High School
- Belka Monika Girls High School
- Dhubni Kanchibari High School
- Mirganj Adarsha High School
- Falgachha High School
- Ramdeb High School
- Khamar Moniram High School
- Khamar Moniram Girls High School
- Kamarpara Girl's High School
- Nazimabad B.L High School
- Dhaniar Kura High School
- Paran Adarsha High School
- Dharmapur D.D.M. High School
- Bamandanga Girls High School
- Sreepur Changmari M.L High School
- Ghagoa High School

== Notable places ==
- Bamondanga Zamidar Bari, a palace, was built in 1252 A.D.
- Teesta bridge

== See also ==
- Upazilas of Bangladesh
- Districts of Bangladesh
- Divisions of Bangladesh
