= Lutfar Rahman Chowdhury =

Bangladeshi politician

Member of Parliament

Personal details
- Party: Jatiya Party (Ershad)

Lutfar Rahman Chowdhury is a Jatiya Party (Ershad) politician and a former member of parliament for Gaibandha-4.

== Career ==
Chowdhury was elected to parliament from Gaibandha-4 as a Jatiya Party candidate in 1986, 1991, and 1996.
