= Gobindaganj Upazila =

Gobindaganj Upazila গোবিন্দগঞ্জ উপজেলা
- Upazila
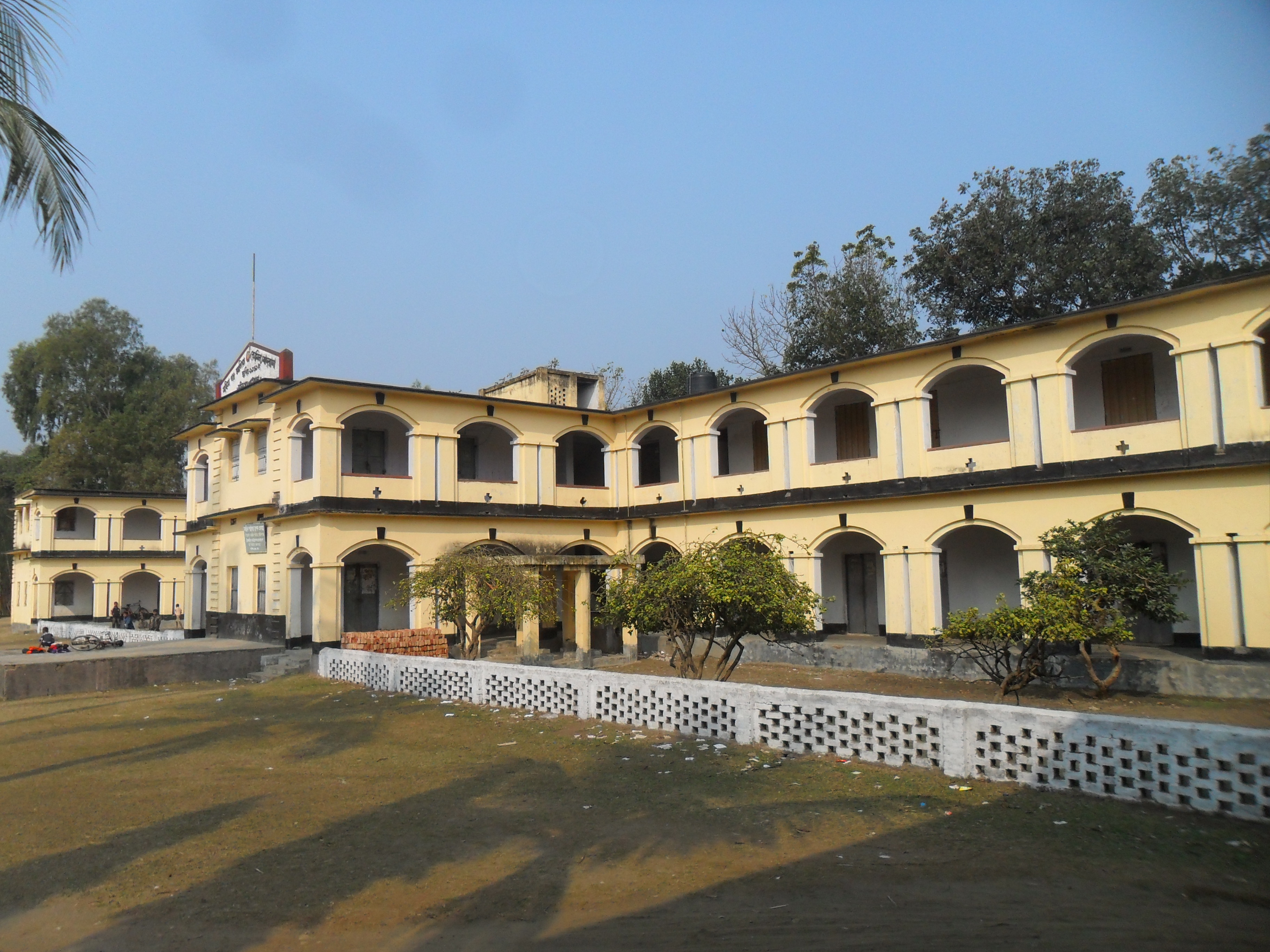
- Mahimaganj Alia Kamil Madrasha, Mahimaganj, Gobindaganj

- Coordinates: 25°8′N 89°23.5′E
- Country: Bangladesh
- Division: Rangpur
- District: Gaibandha

Area
  - Total: 460.42 km^{2} (177.77 sq mi)

Population (2022)
  - Total: 543,144
  - Density: 1,179.7/km^{2} (3,055.3/sq mi)
- Time zone: UTC+6 (BST)
- Postal code: 5740
- Area code: 0541
- Website: gobindaganj.gaibandha.gov.bd

Gobindaganj Upazila mauza geocode map

Gobindaganj (Bengali: গোবিন্দগঞ্জ) is an upazila of Gaibandha District and the Division of Rangpur. It is one of the largest upazila in Bangladesh including 17 unions and 1 municipality.

== Geography ==
Gobindaganj is located at 25.1333°N 89.3917°E. It has a total area of 460.42 km^{2}.

== Demographics ==
Religions in Gobindaganj Upazila (2022)
Religion	Percent
Islam	93.10%
Hinduism	6.15%
Christianity	0.62%
Other or not stated	0.13%

According to the 2022 Bangladeshi census, Gobindaganj Upazila had 149,955 households and a population of 543,144. 9.01% of the population were under 5 years of age. Gobindaganj had a literacy rate (age 7 and over) of 67.24%: 70.60% for males and 64.06% for females, and a sex ratio of 96.37 males for every 100 females. 69,667 (12.83%) lived in urban areas. Ethnic population was 3834 (0.71%), of which Santal were 3103.

According to the 2011 Census of Bangladesh, Gobindaganj Upazila had 132,572 households and a population of 514,696. Of this population, 119,767 (23.27%) were under 10 years of age. Gobindaganj had a literacy rate of 42.59% (for individuals aged 7 and over), which is lower than the national average of 51.8%. The sex ratio was 1,013 females per 1,000 males. A total of 38,415 (7.46%) people lived in urban areas. The ethnic population was 3,351 (0.65%), with the Santal making up 3,086 of that number.

As per the 1991 Bangladesh Census, Gobindaganj had a population of 414,591. Males constituted 50.89% of the population, while females made up 49.11%. The population of Gobindaganj's rural areas was 205,204. The average literacy rate for this Upazila was 23.1% (for individuals aged 7 and over), compared to the national average of 32.4%.

== Administration ==
Gobindaganj Upazila is divided into Gobindaganj Municipality and 17 union parishads: Kamdia, Katabari, Shakhahar, Razahar, Sapmara, Darbosta, Taluk Kanupur, Nakai, Harirampur, Rakhalbururz, Fulbari, Gumanigonj, Kamardaha, Kocha Shahar, Shibpur, Mahimaganj, Shalmara. The union parishads are subdivided into 339 mauzas and 375 villages.

Gobindaganj Municipality is subdivided into 9 wards and 22 mahallas.

In terms of total area and number of unions, it is the second largest upazila in Bangladesh. It is called the nucleus of Rangpur Division. It has 13 branches of different banks and 11 colleges as well.

== Economy ==
1. Small Cottage Industries (Kocha Shahar).

2. Rangpur Sugar Mills Limited (Mahimaganj).

3. Agriculture (Rice & paddy, sugarcane, fisheries, and cattle rearing)

4. Business and others. 5. 001

== Education ==
According to Banglapedia, Gobindagonj Multilateral High School, founded in 1912, is a notable secondary school.

Literacy rate and educational institutions Average literacy 37.8%; male 42.9%, female 32.5%. Educational institutions: college 13, technical college 1, law college 1, teachers training college 1, secondary school 72, primary school 239, madrasa 153. Noted educational institutions: Gobindaganj Degree College (1965), Kamdia Nurul Haque Degree College (1972), Mahimaganj Degree College (1972), Gobindaganj Mahila College (1991), Nakaihat College, Mahimaganj Women College, Phulpukuria College, Shamim & Shakil Technical College, Akramul Haque Computer and ideal College, Shohorgachhi Adarsa Degree College, Gobindaganj Multilateral High School (1912), Kamdia Bilateral High School (1921), Gobindaganj BM Girls' High School (1940), Rangpur Sugar Mills High School (1962), Birat High School (1964), Shahargachhi Girls' High School (1971), Mahimaganj Alia Madrasa (1937), Mahimagonj high School (1945), Chandpara Alim Madrasa (1963), Chandpara Bi-Lateral High School (1965), Kocha Shahar Bi-Lateral High School (1962), Kocha Shahar Shilpanagori College o Goveshona Kendra (2002).
