= Gaibandha =

Town and district headquarters in Gaibandha district, Bangladesh

Gaibandha গাইবান্ধা
- Municipality
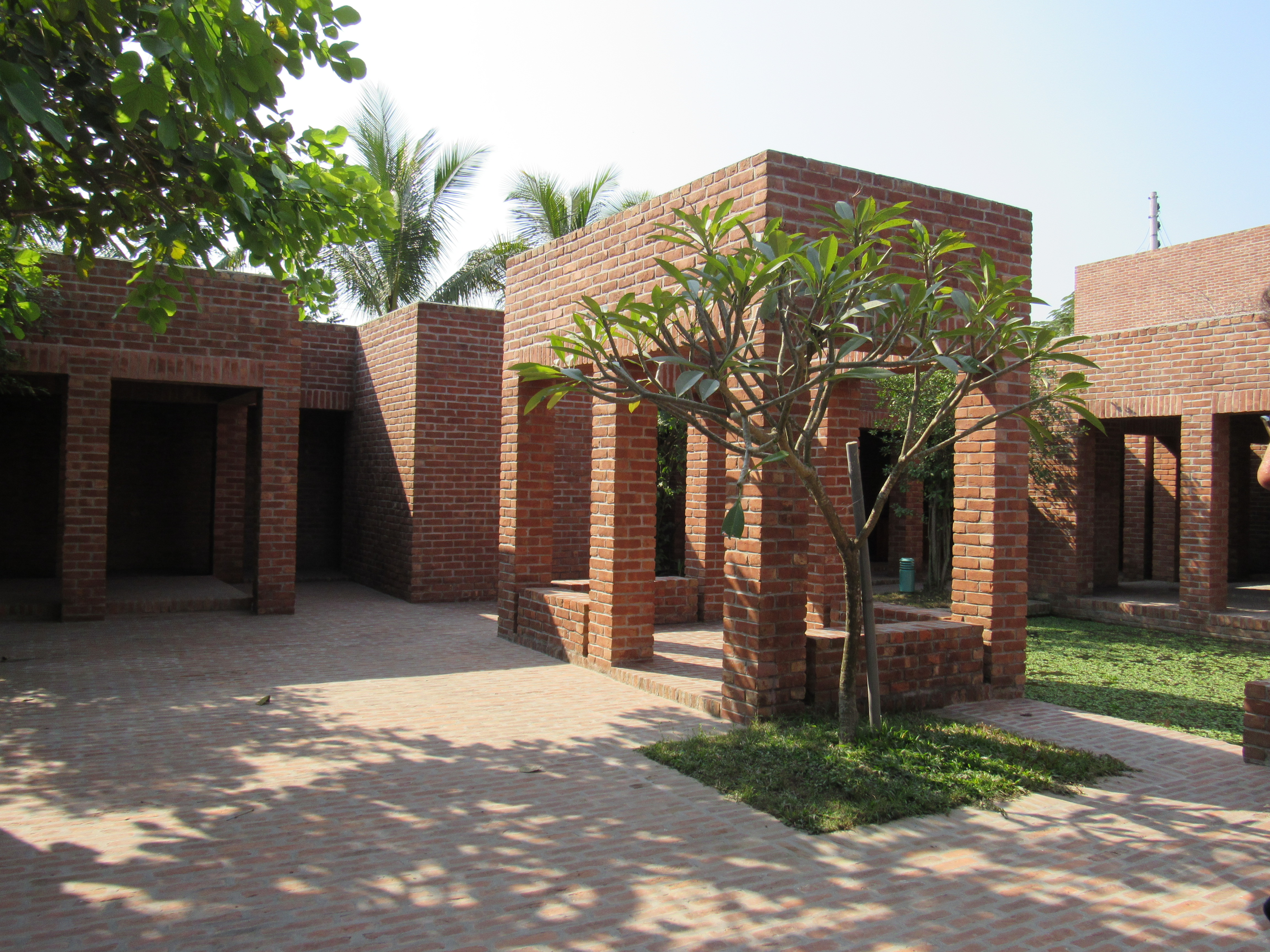

- Location within Rangpur division Location within Bangladesh
- Coordinates: 25°19′44″N 89°32′29″E
- Country: Bangladesh
- Region: Rangpur
- District: Gaibandha
- Upazila: Gaibandha Sadar

Area
  - Total: 32.60 km^{2} (12.59 sq mi)

Population (2022)
  - Total: 79,237
  - Density: 2,431/km^{2} (6,295/sq mi)
- Time zone: UTC+6 (BST)

Gaibandha Municipality mahallah geocode map

Gaibandha (Bengali: গাইবান্ধা) is a municipal town and district headquarters of Gaibandha District in northern Bangladesh. It is a centre of commerce and trade of the Gaibandha District and is located under the Rangpur Division. The area of the city is approximately 10.54 square kilometres (4.07 sq mi). To its north is the neighbouring city of Rangpur.

It consists of nine wards. It is certified as a "ka" (A) category Paurasava (municipality).

== Etymology ==
The city is named after its eponymous district. There are two opinions about the name of Gaibandha. The most famous opinion is: around five thousand years ago, capital of Matsya Kingdom of King Birat was in Gobindaganj area. "Matsa" means fish and "desh" means country(মাছের দেশ). Fishes were abundant in his kingdom so the term "Matsa Desh" was created. According to Mahabharata, king Birat had 60,000 cows which were frequently robbed by robbers. To protect his cattle from robbers, king Birat established a huge cattle-shed. The cattle were tied up alongside the rivers of this area. "Gai" means "cow" and "Bandha" means "to tie up". From this reason the area was called Gaibandha.

== Demographics ==
Religions in Gaibandha (2011)
Religion	Percent
Islam	88.78%
Hinduism	11.20%
Other or not stated	0.02%

According to the 2022 Bangladesh census, Gaibandha city had a population of 79,237 and a literacy rate of 87.66%.

According to the 2011 Bangladesh census, Gaibandha city had 15,430 households and a population of 67,833. 12,736 (18.78%) were under 10 years of age. Gaibandha had a literacy rate (age 7 and over) of 74.48%, compared to the national average of 51.8%, and a sex ratio of 996 females per 1000 males.

== Nearby sites ==
- Shah Sultan Gazi's Mosque
- Balashi Ghat
- Mirer Bagan Zam-E Mosque
- Bardhan Kuthi
- Varatkhali Kastho Mandir
- Naldanga Zamindar Bari
