= Gaibandha District =

District of Rangpur Division in Bangladesh

Gaibandha District গাইবান্ধা জেলা
- District
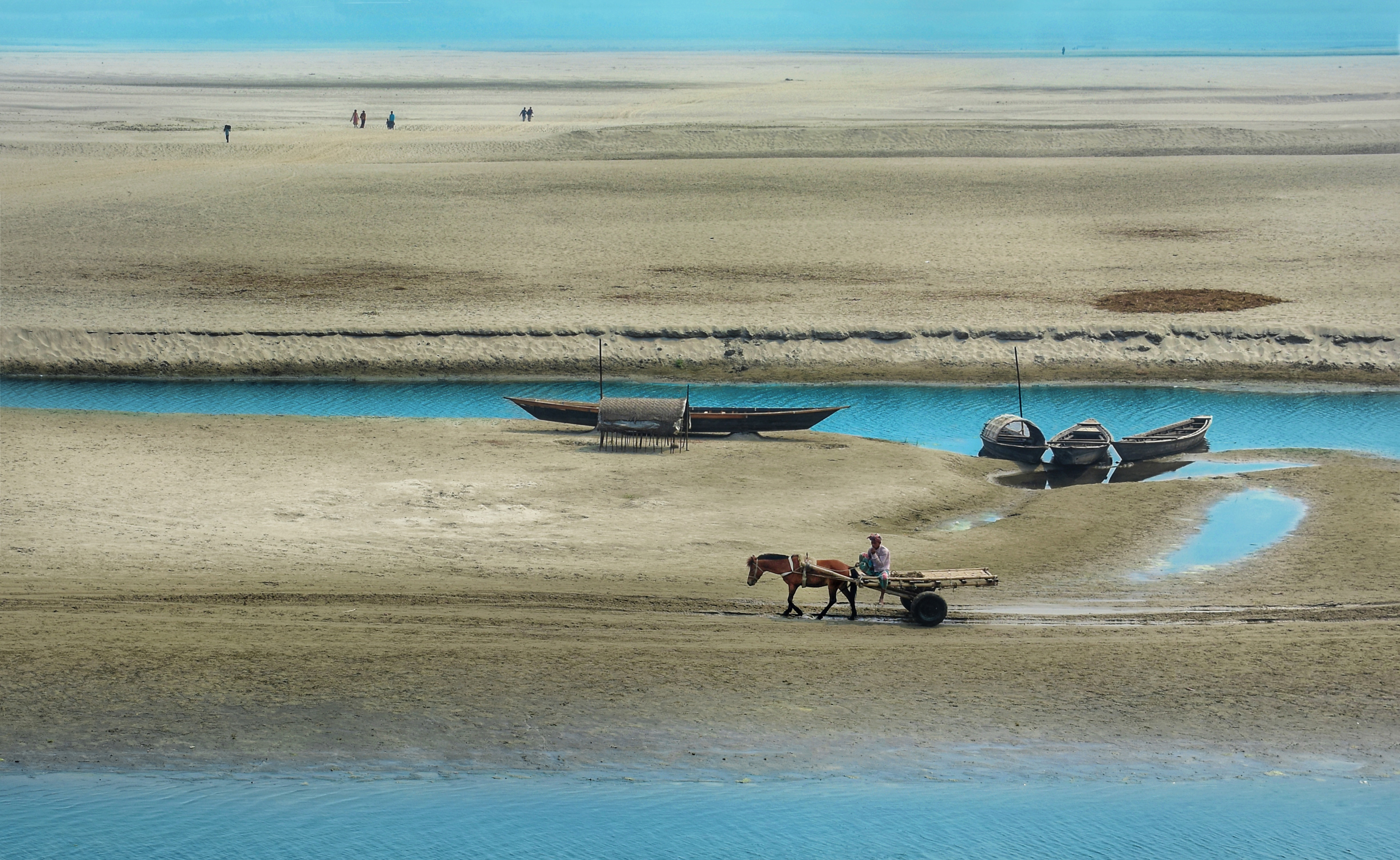
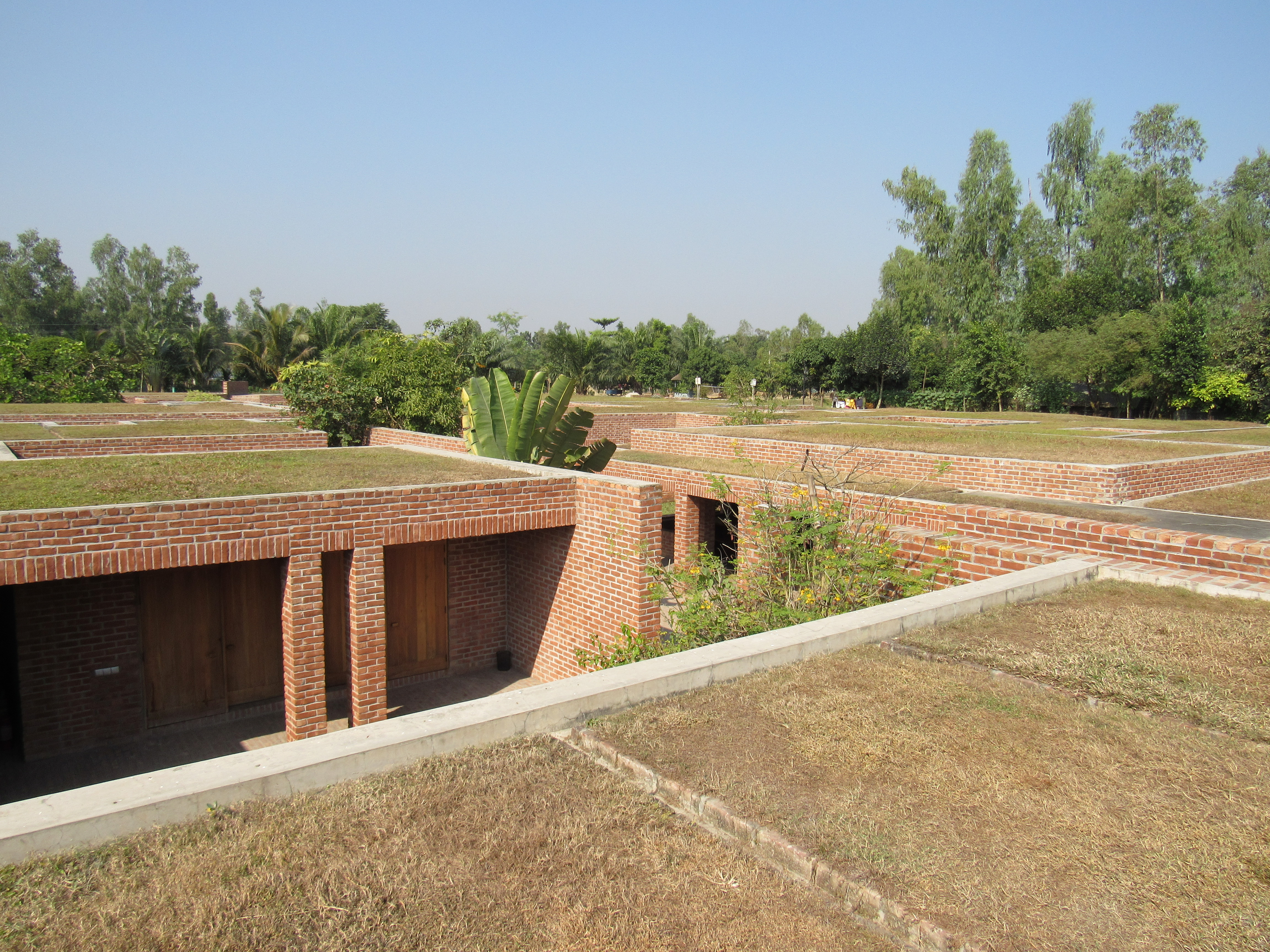
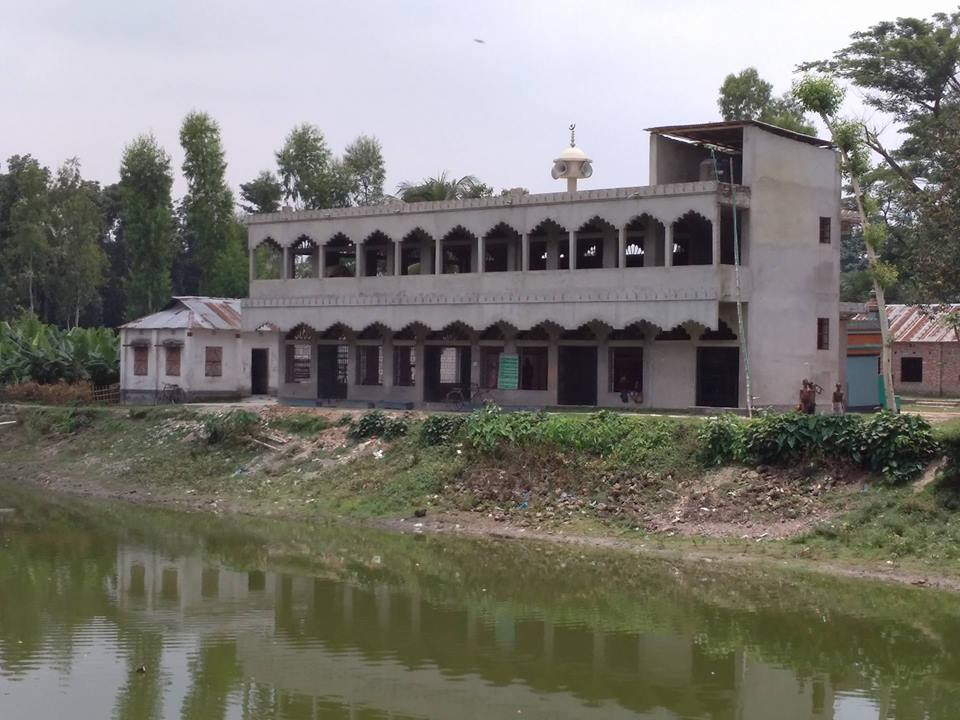
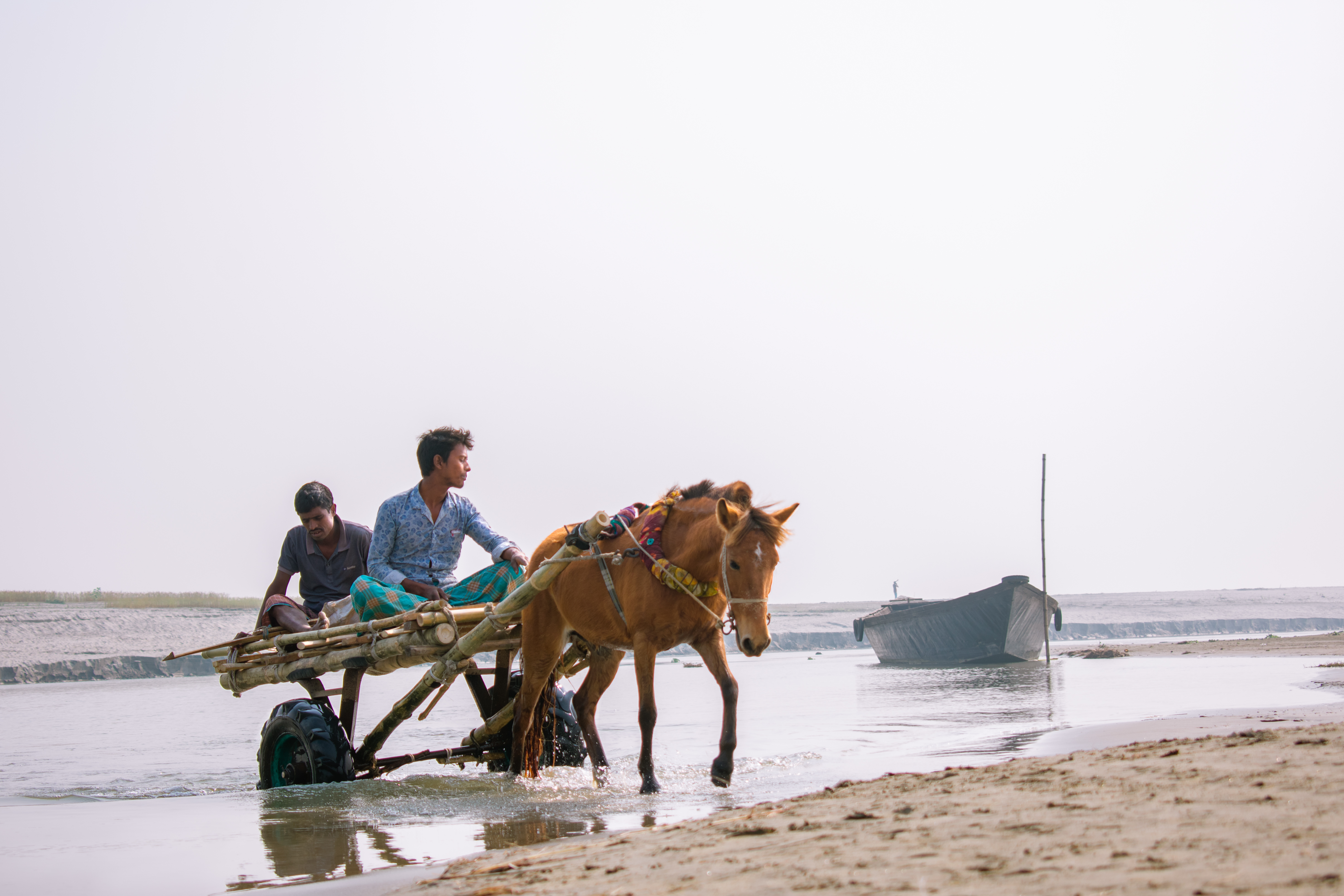
- Clockwise from top-left: Jamuna river, Jamalpur Shahi Mosque, Fulchari Ghat, Friendship Centre

- Location of Gaibandha in Bangladesh
- Interactive map of Gaibandha District
- Coordinates: 25.25°N 89.50°E
- Country: Bangladesh
- Division: Rangpur Division
- Established: 15 February 1984

Government
  - Deputy Commissioner: Mohammad Masudur Rahman Molla

Area
  - Total: 2,114.77 km^{2} (816.52 sq mi)
- Elevation: 27 m (89 ft)

Population (2022)
  - Total: 2,562,233
  - Density: 1,175.73/km^{2} (3,045.1/sq mi)
- Time zone: UTC+06:00 (BST)
- Postal code: 5700
- Area code: 0541
- ISO 3166 code: BD-19
- Website: www.gaibandha.gov.bd

Gaibandha District (Bengali: গাইবান্ধা জেলা) is a district in northern Bangladesh, located within Rangpur Division. Covering an area of 2,179.27 square kilometers (841.42 sq mi), it had a population of 2,562,232 as of the 2022 census. The district's administrative headquarters and largest urban center is Gaibandha town. Originally established as a subdivision in 1875 under the name Bhabaniganj, it was renamed Gaibandha in the same year. On February 15, 1984, Gaibandha was officially upgraded to district status. The district is known for its agricultural production, particularly rice, jute, and vegetables, and is situated at the confluence of several major rivers, including the Jamuna, Teesta, and Brahmaputra.

== Etymology ==
There are two prevailing theories regarding the origin of the name Gaibandha. The more widely accepted theory dates back around five thousand years to the time of King Birat, ruler of the Matsya Kingdom, which had its capital in the Gobindaganj area. The term Matsya Desh (Bengali: মৎস্য দেশ) translates to "land of fish" (Matsya meaning "fish" and Desh meaning "country" in Bengali), as the kingdom was rich in fish. According to the Mahabharata, King Birat owned 60,000 cows that were often targeted by robbers. To protect them, he built a large cattle-shed along the rivers in the area. The Bengali word Gai (গাই) means "cow," and Bandha (বান্ধা) means "to tie up." Thus, the area where the cattle were tied came to be known as Gaibandha.

== History ==
In ancient times, this region was submerged under water, gradually filled by the silt deposits of the Teesta, Brahmaputra, and Jamuna rivers. Historical references to this can be found in the writings of the renowned Chinese traveler Xuanzang, as well as in the astronomical works of Ptolemy. Significant natural events, such as the 1787 flood and the 1898 earthquake, dramatically altered the area's landscape, redirecting the flow of the Teesta River. These changes filled a vast 15-mile stretch between Ghoraghat Upazila in Dinajpur and Tulshighat in Gaibandha, leading to the formation of smaller rivers like the Kartoa, Ghaghot, and Katakhali.

During the British colonial period, Governor Warren Hastings established 24 police outposts (thanas) under the Rangpur district collectorate in 1793. According to a report by E.G. Glazier, the collector of Rangpur in 1873, three of these thanas were located in what is now Gaibandha. Two of them, Gobindaganj and Sadullapur, were established in the Idrakpur pargana, while the third, Bhabaniganj, was set up in the Patildaho pargana.

The Indian Rebellion of 1857 made it difficult to contain rebel activities in Rangpur, prompting the establishment of Bhabaniganj thana along the banks of the Brahmaputra River for better administrative control. Bhabaniganj was officially designated a subdivision (mahakuma) on May 27, 1858. Initially, it comprised only two thanas: Sadullapur and Bhabaniganj. Gobindaganj, which had been part of the Bogra district since April 13, 1821, was incorporated into Bhabaniganj on August 12, 1871. Other areas like Saghata, Phulchari, Palashbari, and finally Sundarganj (in 1870) were also added to Bhabaniganj.

In 1872, river erosion began on the eastern side of the Brahmaputra River, prompting the relocation of the mahakuma (subdivision) from its original site to Gaibandha, 12 kilometers away from Bhabaniganj. The administrative center, or sadar, was under the control of three prominent landlords. The Patiladaho pargana was governed by the Tagore family, reportedly related to the renowned poet Rabindranath Tagore. The Baharbondo pargana was controlled by landlord Manindra Chandra Nandy and his wife, Maharani Swarnamoyee of Kasim Bazar, while the Muktipur pargana was under the Lahiri family of Thanshinghopur.

There was a dispute among the landlords over the location of the new mahakuma headquarters. Eventually, through government intervention, the administrative building and courthouse were established in the Baharbondo pargana, on land donated by Queen Swarnamoyee. As the Bhabaniganj mouza (land area) began to deteriorate due to river erosion, the name of the mahakuma was officially changed from Bhabaniganj to Gaibandha. In the 1980s, when mahakumas were reorganized into districts, Gaibandha mahakuma was elevated to district status.

== Geography ==
Gaibandha District spans an area of 2,179.27 square kilometers (841.42 square miles). It is bordered by Kurigram and Rangpur districts to the north, Bogra District to the south, and Joypurhat, Dinajpur, and Rangpur districts to the west. To the east, the district shares boundaries with Jamalpur and Kurigram districts, as well as the mighty Jamuna River. Administratively, Gaibandha is divided into seven upazilas (sub-districts) and 82 unions (local councils).

The district is rich in water resources, with five main rivers flowing through it. These include the Jamuna, Teesta, Kartoa, Brahmaputra, and Ghaghot rivers, covering a total river area of 107.71 square kilometers (41.59 square miles). The Brahmaputra, Teesta, and Ghaghot are particularly significant due to their contribution to agriculture, transportation, and fisheries in the region.

Historically, Gaibandha had some forest coverage, as noted by Francis Buchanan-Hamilton in his 1808–09 report. However, today there are no remaining forests. The district's soil composition is varied: around 20% of the land in Gobindaganj upazila, specifically the Khiar area, has clay soil, while the rest of the district has a mix of sandy, peat, and loam soils, which are crucial for the district's agricultural productivity.

Gaibandha experiences a monsoonal climate, characterized by heavy rainfall and high humidity during the rainy season. Gaibandha's climate, part of the tropical monsoon system, leads to periodic flooding, which significantly impacts agriculture and infrastructure. Improved flood management projects have been initiated in collaboration with local and international organizations. However, no significant mineral resources have been discovered in the district as of now.

=== Climate ===
Climate data for Gaibandha
Month	Jan	Feb	Mar	Apr	May	Jun	Jul	Aug	Sep	Oct	Nov	Dec	Year
Mean daily maximum °C (°F)	24.8 (76.6)	28.3 (82.9)	33.0 (91.4)	34.6 (94.3)	34.3 (93.7)	32.1 (89.8)	31.3 (88.3)	31.4 (88.5)	31.5 (88.7)	30.1 (86.2)	27.5 (81.5)	25.0 (77.0)	30.5 (86.9)
Mean daily minimum °C (°F)	12.8 (55.0)	16.0 (60.8)	21.0 (69.8)	24.5 (76.1)	25.3 (77.5)	26.1 (79.0)	26.3 (79.3)	26.4 (79.5)	25.6 (78.1)	23.5 (74.3)	18.0 (64.4)	13.8 (56.8)	21.7 (71.1)
Average precipitation mm (inches)	15 (0.6)	20 (0.8)	32 (1.3)	78 (3.1)	160 (6.3)	370 (14.6)	530 (20.9)	400 (15.7)	270 (10.6)	115 (4.5)	12 (0.5)	5 (0.2)	2,007 (79.0)
Average relative humidity (%)	71	65	61	65	74	83	85	84	83	79	72	70	76

== Demographics ==
Historical population
Year	Pop.	±% p.a.
1974	1,339,045	—
1981	1,576,536	+2.36%
1991	1,949,274	+2.14%
2001	2,138,181	+0.93%
2011	2,379,255	+1.07%
2022	2,562,233	+0.68%

According to the 2022 Census of Bangladesh, the population of Gaibandha District was recorded at 2,562,233, comprising 1,241,113 males, 1,320,967 females, and 153 individuals identifying as third gender. 19.04% of the population was under 10 years of age. The district remains predominantly rural, with 2,165,498 residents (84.52%) living in rural areas and 396,735 (15.48%) residing in urban centers. The high rural population in Gaibandha is consistent with other districts in northern Bangladesh, which remain heavily dependent on agriculture. This rural-to-urban ratio mirrors national trends where urbanization is gradual but significant. The literacy rate for individuals aged 7 and above stood at 67.00%, with a higher rate for males (70.31%) compared to females (63.96%).

In terms of religious composition, Muslims form the majority, making up 92.89% of the population, followed by Hindus at 6.93%. A small minority of Christians (0.14%) and other religious groups (0.04%) also reside in the district, mainly from the ethnic communities. The district's population is ethnically homogenous, with 99.75% identifying as Bengali. Minority communities make up 0.25% of the population, totaling 4,150 individuals (2,044 males and 2,106 females), who mainly live in Gobindaganj Upazila.

Religions in Gaibandha District (2022)
Religion	Percent
Muslims	92.89%
Hindus	6.93%
Other or not stated	0.18%

Religion in present-day Gaibandha District
Religion	1941 (Note: Gaibandha subdivision of Rangpur district)		1991		1991		2001		2011		2022	
Religion	Pop.	%	Pop.	%	Pop.	%	Pop.	%	Pop.	%	Pop.	%
Islam	606,904	78.82%	1,438,923	91.27%	1,779,493	91.29%	1,977,778	92.50%	2,205,539	92.70%	2,380,128	92.89%
Hinduism	158,666	20.61%	131,613	8.35%	151,768	7.79%	153,614	7.18%	167,897	7.06%	177,593	6.93%
Tribal religion	4,004	0.52%	—N/a	—N/a	—N/a	—N/a	—N/a	—N/a	—N/a	—N/a	—N/a	—N/a
Others (Note: Including Jainism, Christianity, Buddhism, Zoroastrianism, Judaism, Ad-Dharmis, or not stated)	404	0.05%	6,000	0.38%	18,013	0.92%	6,789	0.32%	5,819	0.24%	4,512	0.18%
Total Population	769,978	100%	1,576,536	100%	1,949,274	100%	2,138,181	100%	2,379,255	100%	2,562,233	100%

=== Language ===
The majority of Gaibandha's population speaks dialects of Bengali that belong to the Rangpur linguistic group, commonly referred to as Rangpuriya. This dialect is prominent throughout the district due to its cultural and geographic connections with Rangpur Division. In the southern areas, specifically Shaghata and Gobindaganj upazilas, the accent is more similar to the North Central Bengali dialect spoken in Bogra, influenced by the neighboring Bogra District. Residents of the chars—the temporary river islands formed by the shifting Jamuna River—speak Eastern Bengali dialects closely related to those from the Dhaka and Mymensingh regions, a result of the historic migrations of communities along the riverbanks.

== Economy ==
Agriculture is the primary occupation in Gaibandha District, engaging 44.45% of the population. Additionally, 27.72% work as agricultural laborers, 2.58% as wage laborers, 1.89% in transportation, 9.11% in commerce, and 4.49% in public and private services, while 9.76% are employed in other sectors. The district has 2,123 small industries, five medium industries, and one large industry.

In the agricultural sector, Gaibandha is home to 4,046 poultry farms, 10,730 dairy farms, 245 fisheries, 18 hatcheries, 16 plant nurseries, and eight artificial cattle breeding centers. The total land area is 217,040 hectares, of which 160,397 hectares are arable, 139,640 hectares are irrigated, and 56,643 hectares are fallow. Water reservoirs cover 5,050.30 hectares. The cropping pattern is diverse, with 20.5% of land producing a single crop, 58.5% producing double crops, and 21% yielding treble crops. Irrigated land accounts for 27.16% of the cultivated area.

The district's main crops include paddy, wheat, jute, sugarcane, potatoes, eggplant, mustard, chili, onions, garlic, and various vegetables. Jute is predominantly grown in the upazilas of Gobindaganj, Palashbari, and northern Gaibandha. While the production of aush rice and tobacco has declined in recent years, banana cultivation has increased significantly, particularly in Gobindaganj and Palashbari.

== Notable places ==
- Rajbirat Prasad, a palace, built in (743-800 A.D) by Samtat Deb
- Naldanga Zamidar Bari
- Bamondanga Zamidar Bari
- Bardhan Kuthi
- Shah Sultan Gazi's Mosque

== Administration ==
Gaibandha District upazila geocode map

Gaibandha District is divided into 7 upazilas, which are further divided into 82 union parishads. The upazilas of the district are:

upazila	Area (km^{2})	No. of unions	population (2022)
Fulchhari Upazila	306.53	7	166,662
Gaibandha Sadar Upazila	320.25	13	499,155
Gobindaganj Upazila	481.66	17	543,101
Palashbari Upazila	190.67	9	267,434
Sadullapur Upazila	227.97	11	313,616
Sundarganj Upazila	426.52	15	482,515
Saghata Upazila	225.67	10	289,597

Included in these upazilas are 4 municipalities, which have a total of 18 wards and 56 mahallas. The municipalities are Gaibandha city, Gobindaganj and Sundarganj.

== Infrastructure ==
=== Health ===
Gaibandha district has one general hospital, Gaibandha Sadar Hospital, which is the only government general hospital serving the district and is located in Gaibandha Sadar. In addition, there are six government hospitals, 46 private hospitals/clinics, 54 family welfare centers, six Upazila health complexes, three maternity and childcare centers, and one tuberculosis clinic. Approximately 89% of the population has access to basic sanitation facilities, which marks significant progress in healthcare infrastructure.

=== Transport ===
Gaibandha has an extensive road network comprising 1,719 kilometers of paved (concrete) roads and 2,638 kilometers of unpaved (dirt) roads. The district is also connected by 56 kilometers of railway lines, served by 14 railway stations, including notable stations like Gaibandha, Bonarpara Junction, and Bamandanga. Additionally, the district features one central bus station and seven helipads. Gaibandha has 5,890 bridges and culverts, playing a critical role in transportation, particularly in rural areas. The national highway runs for 32.8 kilometers, the regional highway spans 42.37 kilometers, and the district highway covers 208.95 kilometers. Although there is no airport in Gaibandha, the railway and road networks ensure connectivity to major cities.

The railway infrastructure dates back to 1875 when the Eastern Bengal Railway established the first railway line in the area. Today, the district is served by intercity trains such as the Kartoa Express, Dolonchapa Express, Lalmoni Express, and Rangpur Express, along with mail trains like Uttarbanga Mail, Bogra Express, Padmarag Express, and Ramsagar Express.

For bus travel, several major operators, including Alhamra Travels, Hanif Travels, Shyamoli Travels, Orin Travels, and S.R. Travels, provide inter-division services. Regular bus services also connect Gaibandha with neighboring districts such as Bogra and Rangpur.

While the Ghaghot River runs through Gaibandha, river transportation is not widely used. Limited boat services are available, offering short trips along the river, though road and rail remain the preferred modes of travel .

== Education ==
The literacy rate in Gaibandha District is approximately 54.03%. The district is home to a variety of educational institutions, including eight government colleges and 48 non-government colleges. In terms of secondary education, there are nine government high schools, 361 non-government high schools, and 44 junior high schools. Religious education is also prominent, with 466 madrasas operating in the district. Additionally, Gaibandha has 1,466 government primary schools and 196 kindergartens.

The district also hosts several specialized institutions, including one Primary Teachers' Training Institute, an Agricultural Training Institute, and an Institute of Livestock Science & Technology.Some of the notable educational institutions in the district include:

Universities and Colleges

- Gaibandha Government College
- Gaibandha Government Women's College
- Ahammad Uddin Shah Shishu Niketan School & College
- Palashbari Government College
- Agricultural Training Institute
- Institute of Livestock Science & Technology

Secondary Schools

- Gaibandha Government Boys' High School
- Gaibandha Government Girls' High School
- Palashbari S.M. Pilot High School

== Notable people ==
- Shah Abdul Hamid, first speaker of Jatiya Sangsad
- Ahmed Hossain, chairman of Rangpur District Board, minister for agriculture, forest & fisheries
- Abu Hussain Sarkar, chief minister of East Pakistan in 1955, health minister of Pakistan in 1956
- Md. Mahabub Elahi Ronju Bir Protik, valiant freedom fighter and company commander of 'Ronju Company of Mukti Bahini' at Gaibandha area during the liberation war of Bangladesh in 1971
- Kazi M. Badruddoza, agronomist
- Badiul Alam, fighter, Bir Uttam
- Tulsi Lahiri, Bengali actor, director, and playwright

== Members of Jatiyo Sangsad ==
Area	Elected MP	Party
Gaibandha-1	Vacant	Vacant
Gaibandha-2	Vacant	Vacant
Gaibandha-3	Vacant	Vacant
Gaibandha-4	Vacant	Vacant
Gaibandha-5	Vacant	Vacant

== See also ==
- Districts of Bangladesh
- Divisions of Bangladesh
- Upazila
- Administrative geography of Bangladesh
