= List of affiliated colleges and institutions to the National University, Bangladesh =

Affiliated colleges and institutions to the National University, Bangladesh

The National University of Bangladesh, the country’s largest public affiliating university, oversees and accredits a wide range of higher education institutions, including government and non-government degree colleges, honours colleges, government colleges, law colleges, and physical education colleges. Spread across all eight administrative divisions, more than two thousand institutions operate under its affiliation, offering undergraduate and postgraduate education to millions of students. This extensive academic network not only ensures the wider availability of higher education but also plays a vital role in the overall development of the nation’s human resources.

According to official data from the National University, a total of 2,275 colleges and institutions are currently affiliated with it. Of these, 1,922 are general education institutions, most of which primarily offer Bachelor (Pass) programs. Meanwhile, 353 institutions provide professional education. It is also noteworthy that within the colleges offering Bachelor (Pass) education, 881 offer Bachelor (Honours) programs, 115 conduct Preliminary to Master’s courses, and 178 institutions run full Master’s programs.

== Dhaka Region ==
| College Code | College Name | District | College Type | EIIN | Address |
|---|---|---|---|---|---|
| 6401 | SAVAR GOVT. COLLEGE | DHAKA | Govt. | 108453 | SAVAR |
| 6402 | DHAMRAI GOVT. COLLEGE | DHAKA | Govt. | 107953 | Dhamrai |
| 6403 | NABOJUG COLLEGE | DHAKA | Non Govt. | 107954 | KUSHURA |
| 6404 | JOYPARA COLLEGE | DHAKA | Non Govt. | 108010 | DOHAR |
| 6405 | GOVT. DOHAR NAWABGANJ COLLEGE | DHAKA | Govt. | 108318 | SHAMSABAD |
| 6406 | ISPAHANI COLLEGE, RAMERKANDA | DHAKA | Govt. | 108116 | RAMERKANDA |
| 6407 | KERANIGANJ MAHILA COLLEGE | DHAKA | Non Govt. | 108117 | AMBAGICHA |
| 6408 | DHAKA CITY COLLEGE | DHAKA | Non Govt. | 107975 | DHANMONDI |
| 6409 | MIRPUR GIRLS IDEAL COLLEGE | DHAKA | Non Govt. | | MIRPUR-10 |
| 6410 | NEW MODEL DEGREE COLLEGE | DHAKA | Non Govt. | 108250 | SUKRABAD |
| 6411 | GOVT. MUSIC COLLEGE | DHAKA | Govt. | 108249 | SHER-E-BANGLA NAGOR |
| 6413 | ADAMJEE CANTONMENT COLLEGE | DHAKA | Non Govt. | 107855 | DHAKA CANTONMENT |
| 6414 | DR. MALEKA COLLEGE | DHAKA | Non Govt. | 107972 | 7/A, DHANMONDI |
| 6415 | PALLABI MOHILA DEGREE COLLEGE | DHAKA | Non Govt. | 108334 | 12/E, PALLABI |
| 6416 | SIDDHESWARI COLLEGE | DHAKA | Non Govt. | 108353 | MOGHBAZAR |
| 6417 | UTTARA ANWARA MODEL COLLEGE | DHAKA | Non Govt. | 108565 | DAKHANKHAN |
| 6418 | GOVT. BIGGYAN COLLEGE | DHAKA | Govt. | 108535 | Farmgate-Tejturi Bazar Rd |
| 6421 | IDEAL COLLEGE | DHAKA | Non Govt. | 107971 | Dhanmondi |
| 6422 | TEJGAON COLLEGE | DHAKA | Non Govt. | 108533 | 16, INDIRA ROAD |
| 6424 | AHSANULLAH INSTITUTE OF INFORMATION & COMMUNICATION TECH. | DHAKA | Non Govt. | | Pallabi |
| 6425 | SK. BORHANUDDIN COLLEGE | DHAKA | Non Govt. | 108137 | 62, NAZIMUDDIN ROAD |
| 6428 | RAMPURA EKRAMUNNESSA COLLEGE | DHAKA | Non Govt. | 108034 | 463, DIT ROAD |
| 6430 | RIZAUL KARIM CHOWDHURY COLLEGE | DHAKA | Non Govt. | 107910 | 10/F, SAIDABAD |
| 6431 | T & T COLLEGE | DHAKA | Non Govt. | 108585 | MOTIJHEEL |
| 6432 | NOTRE DAME COLLEGE | DHAKA | Non Govt. | 108274 | MOTIJHEEL |
| 6433 | KHILGAON MODEL COLLEGE | DHAKA | Non Govt. | 108385 | KHILGAON CHOWRASTA |
| 6434 | SALIMULLAH COLLEGE | DHAKA | Non Govt. | 108510 | TIPU SULTAN ROAD |
| 6438 | DHAKA COMMERCE COLLEGE | DHAKA | Non Govt. | 108207 | MIRPUR |
| 6439 | ABUDHARR GHIFARI COLLEGE | DHAKA | Non Govt. | 108272 | MALIBAGH |
| 6442 | TEJGAON MAHILA COLLEGE | DHAKA | Non Govt. | 108536 | TEJGAON |
| 6443 | CENTRAL WOMENS COLLEGE | DHAKA | Non Govt. | 108512 | ABHOY DAS LANE |
| 6444 | UNIVERSITY WOMENS FED. COLLEGE | DHAKA | Non Govt. | 107976 | DHANMONDI |
| 6446 | MOHAMMADPUR MAHILA COLLEGE | DHAKA | Non Govt. | 108255 | NOORJAHAN ROAD |
| 6447 | LALMATIA GOVT. MAHILA COLLEGE | DHAKA | Govt. | 108251 | LALMATIA |
| 6448 | SIDDHESWARI GIRLS COLLEGE | DHAKA | Non Govt. | 108352 | 148, NEW BAILY ROAD |
| 6449 | SHEIKH FAZILATUNNESSA GOVT. MOHILA COLLEGE | DHAKA | Govt. | 108212 | SECTION-2, MIRPUR |
| 6450 | MIRZA ABBAS MOHILA COLLEGE | DHAKA | Non Govt. | 108275 | 83/1, SHAHJAHANPUR |
| 6451 | DHAKA WOMENS COLLEGE | DHAKA | Non Govt. | 108563 | SECTOR NO-7 |
| 6455 | FAZLUL HAQUE MAHILA COLLEGE | DHAKA | Non Govt. | 108511 | 12- AKHAYA DAS LANE |
| 6456 | DANIA COLLEGE | DHAKA | Non Govt. | 107909 | DANIA, JATRABARI |
| 6457 | MIRPUR COLLEGE | DHAKA | Non Govt. | 108206 | SECTION-2, MIRPUR |
| 6458 | MOHAMMADPUR KENDRIYA COLLEGE | DHAKA | Non Govt. | 108254 | NOORJAHAN ROAD |
| 6459 | HABIBULLAH BAHAR COLLEGE | DHAKA | Non Govt. | 108351 | 7/8 NOW RATUN COLLONY |
| 6460 | HAZI SALIM DEGREE COLLEGE | DHAKA | Non Govt. | 108156 | HAJI BALLU ROAD, RAHMATGONJ |
| 6462 | KOLATIA COLLEGE | DHAKA | Non Govt. | 108115 | KALATIA, KERANIGONG |
| 6464 | DHAKA MOHANAGAR MOHILA COLLEGE | DHAKA | Non Govt. | 108509 | 6 NO SUVASH BOSH AVENUE |
| 6465 | B. D. R. COLLEGE | DHAKA | Non Govt. | | Pillkhana, Newmarket |
| 6466 | SARDAR SURUZZAMAN MAHILA COLLEGE | DHAKA | Non Govt. | 108568 | DAKHINKHAN |
| 6467 | KANCHKURA COLLEGE | DHAKA | Non Govt. | 108566 | KANCHKURA, UTTARKHAN |
| 6468 | T & T ADARSHA MAHILA COLLEGE | DHAKA | Non Govt. | 108036 | MOHAKHALI |
| 6469 | INSTITUTE OF SCIENCE & TECHNOLOGY, DHANMONDI | DHAKA | Non Govt. | | Dhanmondi R/A |
| 6471 | INSTITUTE OF SCIENCE TRADE & TECHNOLOGY, PANTHAPATH | DHAKA | Non Govt. | | MIRPUR |
| 6476 | BHUIYAN ACADEMY | DHAKA | Non Govt. | | Dhanmondi |
| 6477 | A. K. M. RAHMATULLAH COLLEGE | DHAKA | Non Govt. | 108031 | BERAID |
| 6479 | BANGLADESH INSTITUTE OF SCIENCE & TECHNOLOGY | DHAKA | Non Govt. | | NEW KAKRAIL ROAD |
| 6480 | B. K. S. P. COLLEGE | DHAKA | Non Govt. | 134131 | ZIRANI, SAVAR |
| 6482 | ASIAN INSTITUTE OF BUSINESS & TECHNOLOGY | DHAKA | Non Govt. | | ROAD # 15 |
| 6484 | DAFFODIL INSTITUTE OF INFORMATION TECHNOLOGY | DHAKA | Non Govt. | | 64/3, LAKE CIRCUS KALABAGAN |
| 6485 | GOVT. BANGABANDHU COLLEGE | DHAKA | Govt. | 108211 | SHAHIDBAG |
| 6486 | ALHAJ MOCKBUL HOSSAIN DEGREE COLLEGE | DHAKA | Non Govt. | 108252 | MOHAMMADPUR |
| 6487 | DHAKA IMPERIAL COLLEGE | DHAKA | Non Govt. | 107974 | JAHURUL ISLAM CITY |
| 6489 | PALLABI COLLEGE | DHAKA | Non Govt. | 108335 | DUARIPARA |
| 6490 | HAZRAT SHAH ALI MAHILA DEGREE COLLEGE | DHAKA | Non Govt. | 108209 | MIRPUR-1 |
| 6495 | DHAKA STATE COLLEGE | DHAKA | Non Govt. | 107981 | NOORJAHAN ROAD |
| 6497 | NORTHERN COLLEGE BANGLADESH (NCB) | DHAKA | Non Govt. | | MOHAMMADPUR |
| 6505 | UTTARA TOWN COLLEGE | DHAKA | Non Govt. | 108564 | UTTARA |
| 6509 | BGMEA INSTITUTE OF FASHION & TECHNOLOGY | DHAKA | Non Govt. | | SR TOWER, SECTOR-7 |
| 6510 | ALHAJ ABDUL MANNAN COLLEGE | DHAKA | Non Govt. | 108449 | GOHAIL BARI, BKSP |
| 6511 | TOFAZZAL HOSSAIN CHOWDHURY COLLEGE | DHAKA | Non Govt. | 108317 | SHIKARIPARA |
| 6512 | CENTRAL LAW COLLEGE, BIJOYNAGOR | DHAKA | Non Govt. | | BIJOYNAGOR |
| 6513 | DHAKA LAW COLLEGE | DHAKA | Non Govt. | | MOTIJHEEL |
| 6514 | CITY LAW COLLEGE | DHAKA | Non Govt. | | 24 Agomoni Lane |
| 6515 | MIRPUR LAW COLLEGE | DHAKA | Non Govt. | | Mirpur 10 |
| 6516 | JATIYA LAW COLLEGE | DHAKA | Non Govt. | | Maghbazar, Ramna |
| 6517 | GREEN VIEW LAW COLLEGE | DHAKA | Non Govt. | | Master Para Road |
| 6518 | MOHAMMADPUR LAW COLLEGE | DHAKA | Non Govt. | | 8/A/9 Tajmahol Road |
| 6519 | FATEMA LAW COLLEGE | DHAKA | Non Govt. | | Imam Ali Road, Gigatala |
| 6520 | METTROPOLIS IDEAL LAW COLLEGE | DHAKA | Non Govt. | | 22, Indira Rd |
| 6521 | BANGABANDHU LAW COLLEGE | DHAKA | Non Govt. | | Motijheel, Dhaka |
| 6522 | DEMRA LAW COLLEGE | DHAKA | Non Govt. | | Doni Kazla Noyanogor Damra |
| 6523 | JAN-E-ALAM SARKAR LAW COLLEGE | DHAKA | Non Govt. | | KhilKhet, Dhaka |
| 6524 | RUPNAGAR LAW COLLEGE | DHAKA | Non Govt. | | 15/47, Rd No. 15 |
| 6526 | DHANMONDI LAW COLLEGE | DHAKA | Non Govt. | | Kalabagan 2nd Ln, Dhaka |
| 6527 | MAHANAGAR LAW COLLEGE | DHAKA | Non Govt. | | 27/4 Topkhana Road, Segunbagicha |
| 6528 | BANGLADESH LAW COLLEGE | DHAKA | Non Govt. | | 14 no school street |
| 6529 | IDEAL LAW COLLEGE | DHAKA | Non Govt. | | Farmgate |
| 6530 | SHAHEED RAMIZ UDDIN COLLEGE | DHAKA | Non Govt. | 107857 | DHAKA CANTONMENT |
| 6531 | DHAKA MODEL COLLEGE | DHAKA | Non Govt. | 133798 | 14-D, MIRPUR, KAFRUL |
| 6533 | SHER-E-BANGLA TEACHERS TRAINING COLLEGE, MIRPUR | DHAKA | Non Govt. | 133882 | SECTION-A |
| 6534 | IDEAL TEACHERS' TRAINING COLLEGE | DHAKA | Non Govt. | | Sector-5, Uttara Model Town |
| 6535 | GOVT. TEACHERS' TRAINING COLLEGE | DHAKA | Govt. | 133815 | NEWMARKET |
| 6536 | DHAKA MODERN TEACHERS' TRAINING COLLEGE, MOWCHAK | DHAKA | Non Govt. | 133627 | NEW CIRCULAR ROAD |
| 6538 | KHAN BAHADUR AHSAN ULLAH TEACHERS' TRAINING COLLEGE, SHAMOLY | DHAKA | Non Govt. | | 3/D, ROAD-1, SHAYMOLI |
| 6541 | COLLEGE OF EDUCATION RESEARCH AND TRAINING | DHAKA | Non Govt. | | MOTIJHEEL, DHAKA |
| 6543 | SAVAR TEACHERS' TRAINING INSTITUTE, SAVAR | DHAKA | Non Govt. | 134164 | Radio Colont B. P. A. T. C |
| 6544 | NEW RAJDHANI TEACHERS' TRAINING COLLEGE, NILKHET | DHAKA | Non Govt. | | Nilkhet |
| 6545 | SHEIKH FAZILATUNNESSA TEACHERS' TRAINING COLLEGE, 627 KAZIPARA | DHAKA | Non Govt. | | 627 KAZIPARA, DHAKA |
| 6547 | MAHANAGAR TEACHERS' TRAINING COLLEGE | DHAKA | Non Govt. | 133649 | NEW PALTAN LINE |
| 6548 | VICTORIA TEACHERS' TRAINING COLLEGE, LUXMIBAZAR | DHAKA | Non Govt. | 132750 | LUXMIBAZAR |
| 6549 | BIAM TEACHERS' TRAINING COLLEGE | DHAKA | Non Govt. | | 36 New Iskaton, Ramna |
| 6550 | SAIC TEACHERS' TRAINING COLLEGE | DHAKA | Non Govt. | | MIRPUR, BLOCK-B |
| 6552 | NATIONAL TEACHERS' TRAINING INSTITUTE, KHILKHAT | DHAKA | Non Govt. | 133398 | Road No-1/A, Nikunjo Ah/A |
| 6553 | LIBERTY LAW COLLEGE | DHAKA | Non Govt. | | Santinagar, Mouchak |
| 6554 | DEWAN IDRIS LAW COLLEGE, SAVAR | DHAKA | Non Govt. | | SAVAR |
| 6555 | CAPITAL LAW COLLEGE | DHAKA | Non Govt. | | Road-5/A, Mohakhali |
| 6557 | GOVT. PHYSICAL EDUCATION COLLEGE | DHAKA | Govt. | | Mohammadpur, Dhaka |
| 6559 | DEMRA COLLEGE | DHAKA | Non Govt. | 107908 | DEMRA |
| 6560 | INSTITUTE OF LIBRARY AND INFORMATION SCIENCE (ILIS), NILKHET | DHAKA | Non Govt. | | NILKHET |
| 6561 | INSTITUTE FOR LIBRARY AND INFORMATION MANAGEMENT (ILIM) | DHAKA | Non Govt. | | SHANKAR |
| 6563 | SAVAR PHYSICAL EDUCATION | DHAKA | Non Govt. | | Scout Bhaban, Thana Road |
| 6566 | BANGLADESH INSTITUTE OF SPECIAL EDUCATION | DHAKA | Non Govt. | | WEST MALIBAG |
| 6567 | TEACHERS TRAINING COLLEGE FOR SPECIAL EDUCATION | DHAKA | Non Govt. | | Mirpur Dhaka |
| 6568 | PRESS INSTITUTE BANGLADESH (PIB) | DHAKA | Non Govt. | 656819 | 3 Circuit House Road |
| 6571 | ICHAMOTI COLLEGE | DHAKA | Non Govt. | 108319 | GALIMPUR |
| 6572 | PADMA GOVT. COLLEGE | DHAKA | Govt. | 108009 | MUKSUDPUR |
| 6573 | SWID SPECIAL EDUCATION TEACHER'S TRAINING COLLEGE | DHAKA | Non Govt. | | RAMNA |
| 6574 | PRIME TEACHERS' TRAINING COLLEGE | DHAKA | Non Govt. | | House No-57, Road No A/1 |
| 6575 | SHEIKH BAZLUR RAHMAN COLLEGE | DHAKA | Non Govt. | 108256 | sadar Ghat, Gabtali Road |
| 6577 | INTERNATIONAL EDUCATION COLLEGE | DHAKA | Non Govt. | 135357 | HOUSE-39/A, ROAD-8 |
| 6578 | HASHEM UDDIN B. ED. COLLEGE | DHAKA | Non Govt. | | Nobabgong, Dhaka-1230 |
| 6579 | NEW ERA LAW COLLEGE | DHAKA | Non Govt. | | Laxibazar, Dhaka |
| 6580 | DHAKA ART COLLEGE | DHAKA | Non Govt. | | 26 Jafrabad, Rayer Bazar |
| 6582 | SAFS BUSINESS INSTITUTE | DHAKA | Non Govt. | | HOUSE # 105, ROAD # 9/A |
| 6583 | BUSINESS EDUCATION AND MANAGEMENT COLLEGE | DHAKA | Non Govt. | | 15/A, AZIMPUR ROAD |
| 6584 | DHAKA BUSINESS INSTITUTE | DHAKA | Non Govt. | | Green Rd, Dhaka |
| 6585 | ARCHBISHOP T. A. GANGULY TEACHERS TRAINING COLLEGE | DHAKA | Non Govt. | | 97 ASAD AVENU, MOHAMMADPUR |
| 6586 | NATIONAL INSTITUTE OF FASHION TECHNOLOGY | DHAKA | Non Govt. | | G.P.JA-146 |
| 6587 | INSTITUTE OF PROGRESSIVE MERITOCRACY (IPM) | DHAKA | Non Govt. | | Dhaka |
| 6588 | POLICE STAFF COLLEGE, BANGLADESH | DHAKA | Govt. | | Section 14, Mirpur |
| 6589 | SIKDER COLLEGE OF TEXTILE AND FASHION TECHNOLOGY | DHAKA | Non Govt. | | Malibugh |
| 6590 | COLLEGE OF FASHION TECHNOLOGY & MANAGEMENT | DHAKA | Non Govt. | | ROAD: 12, SECTOR:6 |
| 6591 | SHER-E-BANGLA NAGAR ADARSHA MOHILA COLLEGE | DHAKA | Non Govt. | 108534 | SHER-E-BANGLA NAGAR |
| 6592 | NAYABAZAR DEGREE COLLEGE | DHAKA | Non Govt. | 108113 | ATI, KERANIGANJ |
| 6593 | DCCI BUSINESS INSTITUTE | DHAKA | Non Govt. | | MOTIJHEEL |
| 6594 | PROFESSIONAL INSTITUTE OF SCIENCE AND FASHION TECHNOLOGY | DHAKA | Non Govt. | | Rd No 3C |
| 6596 | NATIONAL INSTITUTE OF DESIGN | DHAKA | Non Govt. | | HOUSE-38/1, ROAD-02 |
| 6597 | UNITED COLLEGE OF AVIATION SCIENCE & MANAGEMENT | DHAKA | Non Govt. | | SECTOR- 3, UTTARA |
| 6598 | MATUAIL HAZI ABDUL LATIF BHUIYAN COLLEGE | DHAKA | Non Govt. | 107911 | MATUAIL |
| 6599 | IDEAL INSTITUTE OF BUSINESS & SCIENCE | DHAKA | Non Govt. | | PALLABI, MIRPUR |
| 6601 | STAMFORD COLLEGE | DHAKA | Non Govt. | 107973 | Road-9/A, Dhanmondi |
| 6602 | DHAKA MOHILA (DEGREE) COLLEGE | DHAKA | Non Govt. | 107980 | DHANMODI, DHAKA |
| 6603 | DHAKA INSTITUTE OF FASHION AND TECHNOLOGY | DHAKA | Non Govt. | | MIRPUR, DHAKA |
| 6604 | INSTITUTE OF BUSINESS & TECHNOLOGY (IBT) | DHAKA | Non Govt. | | MIRPUR ROAD, DHAKA-1207 |
| 6605 | UTTARA INSTITUTE OF BUSINESS AND TECHNOLOGY. (UIBT) | DHAKA | Non Govt. | | UTTARA, DHAKA-1230 |
| 6606 | CROWN INSTITUTE OF BUSINESS AND TECHNOLOGY | DHAKA | Non Govt. | 134566 | AMTOLI, MOHAKHALI C/A |
| 6607 | SHYAMOLI IDEAL COLLEGE | DHAKA | Non Govt. | | |
| 6608 | SHAHEED PRESIDENT ZIAUR RAHMAN COLLEGE | DHAKA | Non Govt. | 108114 | HAZRUTPUR, ITAVARA |
| 6609 | GULSHAN COLLEGE | DHAKA | Non Govt. | 108032 | Lichu Bagan Rd, Dhaka |
| 6610 | SHURER DHARA COLLEGE OF MUSIC | DHAKA | Non Govt. | | LAMATIA, DHAKA |
| 6611 | DR. M. MIZANUR RAHMAN PROFESSIONAL COLLEGE | DHAKA | Non Govt. | 137806 | Mohammadpur-Adabor Dhaka |
| 6612 | BHALUM ATAUR RAHMAN KHAN COLLEGE | DHAKA | Non Govt. | 107957 | Dhaka - Kusura Rd, Kalampur |
| 6613 | EMINENCE COLLEGE | DHAKA | Non Govt. | 137594 | Gareeb-e-Nawaz Ave |
| 6614 | HAJI ABDUL AWAL COLLEGE | DHAKA | Non Govt. | 108057 | Munsir Hat Masjid Rd |
| 6615 | UPDATE COLLEGE | DHAKA | Non Govt. | | UTC Building 8 Panthapath |
| 6616 | UTTARA ADHUNIK LAW COLLEGE | DHAKA | Non Govt. | | sector-6, uttara |
| 6617 | ABDULLAH AL MAMUN THEATRE SCHOOL | DHAKA | Non Govt. | | road no-25/a, banani |
| 6618 | APPARELS INSTITUTE OF FASHION & TECHNOLOGY (AIFT) | DHAKA | Non Govt. | 136179 | |
| 6619 | INSPIRATION INSTITUTE OF DESIGN & TECHNOLOGY | DHAKA | Non Govt. | | Progati sarani, Dhaka |
| 6620 | COLLEGE OF AVIATION TECHNOLOGY | DHAKA | Non Govt. | | Road-2, Sector-11, Uttara |
| 6621 | ROKEYA AHSAN COLLEGE | DHAKA | Non Govt. | 107912 | Paradagar, Matuail Jatrabari |
| 6622 | COUNTER FOTO A CENTER FOR VISUAL ARTS | DHAKA | Non Govt. | | MIRPUR |
| 6623 | DHAKA PROFESSIONALS COLLEGE (DPC) | DHAKA | Non Govt. | | SUTRAPUR, DHAKA |
| 6624 | SHAHID S. A. MEMORIAL FASHION DESIGN & TEXTILE COLLEGE | DHAKA | Non Govt. | | DHAKA |
| 6625 | MOFAZZAL - MOMENA CHAKLADAR MOHILA COLLEGE | DHAKA | Non Govt. | 108452 | DHAKA |
| 6626 | GULSHAN COMMERCE COLLEGE | DHAKA | Non Govt. | 131904 | DHAKA |
| 6627 | NATIONAL INSTITUTE OF SCIENCE AND TECHNOLOGY (NIST) | DHAKA | Non Govt. | | DHAKA |
| 6628 | Daffodil Institute of Science and Technology (DIST) | DHAKA | Non Govt. | | Uttara, Dhaka |
| 6629 | MIRZA GOLAM HAFIZ COLLEGE | DHAKA | Non Govt. | 108450 | ASHULIA |
| 6630 | HARUN MOLLAH COLLEGE | DHAKA | Non Govt. | 131878 | DHAKA |
| 6631 | FIRE RESEARCH AND TRAINING INSTITUTE (FRTI) | DHAKA | Govt. | | MIRPUR, DHAKA |
| 6632 | DHAKA INSTITUTE OF TECHNOLOGY (DIT) | DHAKA | Non Govt. | | Uttara Sector-8 |
| 6633 | H R MEMORIAL COLLEGE | DHAKA | Non Govt. | 108386 | |
| 6634 | CODERSTRUST BANGLADESH | DHAKA | Non Govt. | | BLOCK C, BANANI |
| 6001 | GOVT. RAJENDRA COLLEGE | FARIDPUR | Govt. | 108797 | FARIDPUR |
| 6002 | GOVT. SARDA SUNDARI MAHILA COLLEGE | FARIDPUR | Govt. | 108794 | JHILTULI |
| 6003 | GOVT. YASIN COLLEGE | FARIDPUR | Govt. | 108795 | TAPAKHOLA |
| 6004 | CHARBHADRASAN GOVT. COLLEGE | FARIDPUR | Govt. | 108728 | FARIDPUR |
| 6005 | GOVT. KAZI MAHBUBULLAH (K. M.) COLLEGE | FARIDPUR | Govt. | 108659 | BHANGA |
| 6006 | NAGARKANDA COLLEGE | FARIDPUR | Non Govt. | 108900 | FARIDPUR, 7840 |
| 6007 | BOALMARI GOVT. COLLEGE | FARIDPUR | Govt. | 108708 | KAMAR GRAM |
| 6008 | KADIRDI DEGREE COLLEGE | FARIDPUR | Non Govt. | 108710 | KADIRDI |
| 6009 | ALFADANGA ADARSHA COLLEGE | FARIDPUR | Non Govt. | 108620 | KAMARGRAM |
| 6010 | ALFADANGA GOVT. COLLEGE | FARIDPUR | Govt. | 108618 | ALFADANGA, FARIDPUR |
| 6011 | GOVT. BIRSRESTHA ABDUR ROUF COLLEGE | FARIDPUR | Govt. | 108854 | KAMARKHALI, MADHUKHALI |
| 6012 | GOVT. AINUDDIN COLLEGE | FARIDPUR | Govt. | 108853 | MADHUKHALI, FARIDPUR |
| 6013 | SADARPUR GOVT. COLLEGE | FARIDPUR | Govt. | 108933 | SADARPUR, FARIDPUR. |
| 6014 | KAZI SHIRAJUL ISLAM MOHILA COLLEGE | FARIDPUR | Non Govt. | 108709 | BOALMARI |
| 6015 | NABOKAM PALLY COLLEGE | FARIDPUR | Non Govt. | 108901 | JADUNANDI |
| 6016 | BHANGA MOHILA COLLEGE | FARIDPUR | Non Govt. | 108660 | BHANGA, FARIDPUR |
| 6017 | FARIDPUR LAW COLLEGE | FARIDPUR | Non Govt. | | Jiltoli, Sadar, faridpur |
| 6018 | FARIDPUR CITY COLLEGE | FARIDPUR | Non Govt. | 108798 | STATION ROAD FARIDPUR |
| 6019 | J. M. MODEL TEACHERS' TRAINING COLLEGE | FARIDPUR | Non Govt. | | West Khabaspur, Faridpur |
| 6020 | SUNFLOWER TEACHERS' TRAINING COLLEGE | FARIDPUR | Non Govt. | | 2 NO SAROK WEST GOALCHAMOT |
| 6021 | GOVT. TEACHERS' TRAINING COLLEGE | FARIDPUR | Govt. | 133293 | Sadar, Faridpur |
| 6022 | ENGINEER KHANDAKER MOSHARRAF HOSSAIN COLLEGE | FARIDPUR | Non Govt. | 108796 | GOALCHAMOT, FARIDPUR |
| 6023 | HAZI ABDUR RAHMAN ABDUL KARIM COLLEGE | FARIDPUR | Non Govt. | 108856 | KURANEARCHAR |
| 6024 | AKHCHASI MAHILA DEGREE COLLEGE | FARIDPUR | Non Govt. | 108855 | MADHUKHALI, FARIDPUR |
| 6025 | BANGABANDHU GOVT. COLLEGE | FARIDPUR | Govt. | 108711 | BOALMARI, FARIDPUR |
| 6026 | MAHILA COLLEGE | FARIDPUR | Non Govt. | 108934 | SADARPUR |
| 6027 | ALHAJ ABDUL KHALEQUE COLLEGE | FARIDPUR | Non Govt. | 108803 | FARIDPUR |
| 5501 | BHAWAL BADRE ALAM GOVT. COLLEGE | GAZIPUR | Govt. | 109031 | CHANDONA CHOWRASTA |
| 5502 | BHAWAL MIRZAPUR COLLEGE | GAZIPUR | Non Govt. | 109035 | BHAWAL MIRZAPUR |
| 5503 | PEAR ALI COLLEGE | GAZIPUR | Non Govt. | 109422 | MAWNA, SREEPUR |
| 5504 | ROVAR POLLY COLLEGE | GAZIPUR | Non Govt. | 109034 | BAHADURPUR ROVERPALLI |
| 5505 | KAZI AZIMUDDIN COLLEGE | GAZIPUR | Non Govt. | 109032 | JOYDEBPUR GAZIPUR |
| 5506 | KAPASIA COLLEGE | GAZIPUR | Non Govt. | 109323 | KAPASIA |
| 5507 | SREEPUR MUKTIJODDHA RAHMOT ALI GOVT. COLLEGE | GAZIPUR | Govt. | 109423 | SREEPUR |
| 5508 | KALIAKOIR DEGREE COLLEGE | GAZIPUR | Non Govt. | 109110 | BARDAL |
| 5509 | GOVT. KALIGANJ SRAMIK COLLEGE | GAZIPUR | Govt. | 109180 | TUMULIA |
| 5510 | JAMALPUR COLLEGE | GAZIPUR | Non Govt. | 109181 | VOWAL JAMALPUR |
| 5511 | TONGI GOVT. COLLEGE | GAZIPUR | Govt. | 109061 | AUCHPARA, TONGI |
| 5512 | GAZIPUR CANTONMENT COLLEGE | GAZIPUR | Non Govt. | 109033 | BANGLADESH ORDNANCE FACTORIES |
| 5513 | MODEL INSTITUTE OF SCIENCE & TECHNOLOGY | GAZIPUR | Non Govt. | | WEST VURULIA, DUET |
| 5514 | SHAHID TAJUDDIN AHMAD DEGREE COLLEGE | GAZIPUR | Govt. | 109321 | RAYED, BHORMI, KAPASIA |
| 5515 | BORMI COLLEGE | GAZIPUR | Non Govt. | 109421 | BORMI |
| 5516 | MIZANUR RAHMAN KHAN DEGREE MOHILA COLLEGE | GAZIPUR | Non Govt. | 109420 | SREEPUR, GAZIPUR |
| 5518 | JATIR PITA BANGABANDHU GOVT. COLLEGE | GAZIPUR | Govt. | 109112 | CHANDRA, KALIAKOIR |
| 5519 | GAZIPUR LAW COLLEGE | GAZIPUR | Non Govt. | | JOYDEBPUR, GAZIPUR |
| 5520 | PUBAIL ADARSHA COLLEGE | GAZIPUR | Non Govt. | 109036 | 41 NO WORD, PUBAIL |
| 5521 | GAZIPUR TEACHERS' TRAINING COLLEGE | GAZIPUR | Non Govt. | | Chandona Chowrasta |
| 5522 | GAZIPUR PHYSICAL EDUCATION COLLEGE | GAZIPUR | Non Govt. | | Bowel Mirzapur, Gazipur |
| 5523 | GAZIPUR GOVT. MOHILA COLLEGE | GAZIPUR | Govt. | 109030 | COLLEGE ROAD, JOYDEBPUR |
| 5524 | BARAIBARI ADARSHA DEGREE COLLEGE | GAZIPUR | Non Govt. | 109111 | BARAI BARI |
| 5525 | ABDUL AWAL COLLEGE | GAZIPUR | Non Govt. | 109425 | ABDER, TELEHATY, SREEPUR |
| 5526 | BGIFT INSTITUTE OF SCIENCE AND TECHNOLOGY (BIST) | GAZIPUR | Non Govt. | | CHANDANA, CHOWRASTA |
| 5527 | GAZIPUR CENTRAL PUBLIC MANAGEMENT INSTITUTE | GAZIPUR | Non Govt. | | Sadar, Gazipur |
| 5528 | KONABARI DEGREE COLLEGE | GAZIPUR | Non Govt. | 109037 | KONABARI |
| 5529 | BANGATAJ COLLEGE | GAZIPUR | Non Govt. | 109322 | KHIRATI, KAPASIA |
| 5530 | BANGLADESH MADRASA TEACHER'S TRAINING INSTITUTE | GAZIPUR | Non Govt. | | Sain Board, Gazipur |
| 5531 | SHARIF MOMTAJ UDDIN AHMED DEGREE COLLEGE | GAZIPUR | Non Govt. | 109325 | TOKE NAYAN BAZAR, KAPASIA |
| 5532 | MUKTIJODDHA COLLEGE | GAZIPUR | Non Govt. | 109029 | BHABANIPUR |
| 5533 | DHALADIA DEGREE COLLEGE | GAZIPUR | Non Govt. | 109426 | DHALADIA, BHAWAL RAJABARI |
| 5534 | KALIGONJ MOHILA DEGREE COLLEGE | GAZIPUR | Non Govt. | 109182 | KALIGONG |
| 5535 | GAZIPUR LIBRARY SCIENCE & PROFESSIONAL INSTITUTE | GAZIPUR | Non Govt. | | |
| 5536 | GAZIPUR CITY INSTITUTE | GAZIPUR | Non Govt. | | sadar, gazipur |
| 5537 | GAZIPUR MATROPOLITAN INSTITUTE (GMI) | GAZIPUR | Non Govt. | 135793 | GAZIPUR |
| 6101 | GOVT. BANGABANDHU COLLEGE | GOPALGONJ | Govt. | 109481 | GOVT. BANGABANDHU COLLEGE |
| 6102 | SK. FAZILATUNNESSA MAHILA COLLEGE | GOPALGONJ | Govt. | 109483 | 62, SISUBAN ROAD, GOPALGONJ |
| 6103 | GOVT. NAZRUL COLLEGE, SATPAR | GOPALGONJ | Govt. | 109484 | SATPAR |
| 6104 | BANGA RATNA COLLEGE, GOPALGANJ | GOPALGONJ | Non Govt. | | KALIGRAM, JALIRPAR |
| 6105 | GOVT. MUKSUDPUR COLLEGE | GOPALGONJ | Govt. | 109654 | GOPINATHPUR |
| 6106 | SK. LUTFAR RAHMAN ADARSHA GOVT. COLLEGE | GOPALGONJ | Govt. | 109591 | KOTALIPARA, GOPALGONJ |
| 6107 | KAZI MANTU COLLEGE, BHANGARHAT | GOPALGONJ | Non Govt. | 109592 | BHANGARHAT, KOTALIPARA |
| 6108 | M. A. KHALEQ COLLEGE | GOPALGONJ | Non Govt. | 109538 | KASHIANI |
| 6109 | JOYNAGAR YAR ALI KHAN DEGREE COLLEGE | GOPALGONJ | Non Govt. | 109536 | JONASUR, KASHIANI |
| 6110 | RAMDIA GOVT. SREEKRISHNA COLLEGE | GOPALGONJ | Govt. | 109539 | RAMDIA |
| 6111 | GOVT. SHEIKH MUJIBUR RAHMAN COLLEGE | GOPALGONJ | Govt. | 109678 | PATGATI, TUNGIPARA |
| 6113 | RAJPAT COLLEGE | GOPALGONJ | Non Govt. | 109535 | RAJPAT |
| 6114 | LALMIA CITY COLLEGE | GOPALGONJ | Non Govt. | 109482 | GOPALGONJ |
| 6115 | M. H. KHAN DEGREE COLLEGE | GOPALGONJ | Non Govt. | 109485 | P.O- ULPUR, GOPALGONJ |
| 6116 | SHEIKH FAZLUL KARIM SELIM LAW COLLEGE | GOPALGONJ | Non Govt. | | Jhanapara road, Sadar |
| 6117 | M A ROUF TEACHERS' TRAINING COLLEGE | GOPALGONJ | Non Govt. | 133404 | Hira Bari Road, Gopalgong |
| 6119 | DR. IMDADUL HUQ MEMORIAL COLLEGE | GOPALGONJ | Non Govt. | 130645 | BASHBARIA |
| 6120 | N. HAQUE COLLEGE OF BUSINESS & TECHNOLOGY (NCBT) | GOPALGONJ | Non Govt. | 135303 | MANIKDAH |
| 6121 | GOVT. SHEIKH RASEL COLLEGE | GOPALGONJ | Govt. | 109590 | Gopalganj - Kotalipara Road |
| 6122 | RAMSHIL COLLEGE | GOPALGONJ | Non Govt. | 109589 | gopalgong |
| 6123 | UJANI B.K.B UNION DEGREE COLLEGE | GOPALGONJ | Non Govt. | 109653 | UJANI |
| 6124 | SHEIKH HASINA ADARSHA MAHABIDYALAYA | GOPALGONJ | Non Govt. | 109593 | KOTALIPARA |
| 4901 | GOVT. GURUDAYAL COLLEGE | KISHOREGANJ | Govt. | 110496 | HARUA, KISHOREGANJ |
| 4902 | KARIMGANJ GOVERNMENT COLLEGE | KISHOREGANJ | Govt. | 110382 | KARIMGANJ, KISHOREGANJ |
| 4903 | KISHOREGANJ GOVT. MAHILA COLLEGE | KISHOREGANJ | Govt. | 110494 | PURATON COURT ROAD |
| 4904 | WALI NEWAZ KHAN COLLEGE | KISHOREGANJ | Non Govt. | 110495 | NEWTOWN, KISHOREGONJ |
| 4905 | KATHIADI GOVT. COLLEGE | KISHOREGANJ | Govt. | 110434 | KATIADI KISHOREGANJ |
| 4906 | HAZI ASMAT GOVERNMENT COLLEGE | KISHOREGANJ | Govt. | 110290 | BHAIRAB, BHAIRAB |
| 4907 | BAJITPUR GOVT. COLLEGE | KISHOREGANJ | Govt. | 110259 | BASANTAPUR |
| 4908 | KULIARCHAR GOVERNMENT COLLEGE | KISHOREGANJ | Govt. | 110512 | KULIARCHAR |
| 4909 | PAKUNDIA GOVERNMENT COLLEGE | KISHOREGANJ | Govt. | 110615 | PAKUNDIA |
| 4910 | HOSSAINPUR GOVERNMENT COLLEGE | KISHOREGANJ | Govt. | 110325 | ARAIBARIA, HOSSAINPUR |
| 4911 | GOVT. ROTARY COLLEGE | KISHOREGANJ | Govt. | 110239 | AUSTAGRAM |
| 4912 | DR. ABDUL MANNAN MAHILA COLLEGE | KISHOREGANJ | Non Govt. | 110433 | KATIADI PURBO PARA |
| 4913 | MUKTIJODDHA ABDUL HAQUE GOVT. COLLEGE | KISHOREGANJ | Govt. | 110528 | MITHAMOIN, MITHAMOIN |
| 4914 | GOVT. ZILLUR RAHMAN MAHILA COLLEGE | KISHOREGANJ | Govt. | 110289 | BHAIRAB BAZAR |
| 4915 | HAJI ZAFAR ALI COLLEGE | KISHOREGANJ | Non Govt. | 110617 | MOTKHOLA, PAKUNDIA |
| 4916 | SAYED ASHRAFUL ISLAM POURA MOHILA DEGREE COLLEGE | KISHOREGANJ | Non Govt. | 110493 | KISHOREGANJ |
| 4917 | PAKUNDIA ADARSHA MOHILA COLLEGE | KISHOREGANJ | Non Govt. | 110616 | PAKUNDIA |
| 4918 | INSTITUTE OF BUSINESS AND INFORMATION TECHNOLOGY | KISHOREGANJ | Non Govt. | | 1004, NILLGANJ ROAD |
| 4919 | TEACHERS' TRAINING COLLEGE | KISHOREGANJ | Non Govt. | 133585 | Mohamoddi Mension |
| 4920 | BHAIRAB TEACHERS' TRAINING COLLEGE | KISHOREGANJ | Non Govt. | | Bhairab, Kishorgong |
| 4921 | RAFIQUL ISLAM WOMENS COLLEGE | KISHOREGANJ | Non Govt. | 110288 | BHAIRABPUR NORTH PARA |
| 4922 | HOSSAINPUR ADARSHA MOHILA COLLEGE | KISHOREGANJ | Non Govt. | 110326 | ARAIBARIA, HOSSAINPUR |
| 4923 | RAHIM SATTER IDEAL DEGREE COLLEGE | KISHOREGANJ | Non Govt. | 110497 | KALTIA BINATI KISHOREGANJ |
| 4924 | HOSSAINDI ADARSHA DEGREE COLLEGE | KISHOREGANJ | Non Govt. | 110614 | HOSSAINDI |
| 4925 | MUKTI JODDHA ADARSHA GOVT. COLLEGE | KISHOREGANJ | Govt. | 110544 | NIKLI |
| 4926 | RASHTRAPATI ABDUL HAMID GOVT. COLLEGE | KISHOREGANJ | Govt. | 110345 | ITNA, KISHOREGONJ |
| 4927 | TARAIL MUKTIZUDHA GOVT. COLLEGE | KISHOREGANJ | Govt. | 110637 | SOHILATI, TARAIL |
| 4928 | SHIMULKANDI COLLEGE | KISHOREGANJ | Non Govt. | 110291 | Bhairab, Kishoreganj |
| 6301 | MADARIPUR GOVT. COLLEGE | MADARIPUR | Govt. | 110785 | MADARIPUR |
| 6302 | MADARIPUR GOVT. SUFIA MAHILA COLLEGE | MADARIPUR | Govt. | 110786 | DAGHA SHARIF ROAD, MADARIPUR |
| 6303 | CHARMUGURIA COLLEGE | MADARIPUR | Non Govt. | 110784 | NEW TOWN, MADARIPUR |
| 6304 | BORHAMGANJ GOVT. COLLEGE | MADARIPUR | Govt. | 111088 | GOATOLA |
| 6305 | SYED ABUL HOSSAIN COLLEGE | MADARIPUR | Non Govt. | 110716 | PANGASHIA |
| 6306 | SHAHID SMRITI COLLEGE, SASHIKAR | MADARIPUR | Non Govt. | 110717 | SASHIKAR, KALKINI |
| 6307 | GOVT. RAJOIR COLLEGE | MADARIPUR | Govt. | 110818 | RAJOIR COLLEGE |
| 6308 | RIZIA BEGUM MAHILA COLLEGE | MADARIPUR | Non Govt. | 110881 | SHIBCHAR |
| 6309 | NURUL AMIN DEGREE COLLEGE | MADARIPUR | Non Govt. | 110882 | UMEDPUR |
| 6310 | BANGABANDHU LAW COLLEGE | MADARIPUR | Non Govt. | | NEW TOWN, MADARIPUR |
| 6311 | MADARIPUR TEACHERS' TRAINING COLLEGE | MADARIPUR | Non Govt. | | Bakultolla, Khulpaddi |
| 6312 | SHAHEBRAMPUR KABI NAZRUL ISLAM COLLEGE | MADARIPUR | Non Govt. | 110715 | SHAHEBRAMPUR |
| 6313 | ABCK SYED ABUL HOSSAIN COLLEGE | MADARIPUR | Non Govt. | 131881 | DATTA KANDUA |
| 6314 | ELIAS AHMED CHOWDHURY COLLEGE | MADARIPUR | Non Govt. | 110879 | DATTAPARA, SHIBCHAR |
| 6315 | GOVT. SHEIKH HASINA ACADEMY & WOMEN'S COLLEGE | MADARIPUR | Govt. | 110719 | DASAR, KALKINI |
| 6316 | SYED ABUL HOSSAIN COLLEGE | MADARIPUR | Non Govt. | 110787 | KHOAJPUR TAKERHAT |
| 6317 | D.K. IDEAL SYED ATAHAR ALI ACADEMY AND COLLEGE | MADARIPUR | Non Govt. | 110718 | DASAR, KALKINI |
| 6318 | KABIRAJPUR SAIFUDDIN DEGREE COLLEGE | MADARIPUR | Non Govt. | 110817 | Rajoir |
| 6320 | CHILARCHAR BALIKANDI SHEIKH FAZILATUNNESA MUJIB COLLEGE | MADARIPUR | Govt. | 110762 | Madaripur Sadar, Madaripur |
| 6321 | SHEIKH RASEL GOVT. COLLEGE | MADARIPUR | Govt. | 110820 | LUNDI |
| 6322 | INSTITUTE OF LIBRARY AND INFORMATION SCIENCE | MADARIPUR | Non Govt. | | MADARIPUR SADAR |
| 5801 | GOVT. DEBENDRA COLLEGE | MANIKGANJ | Govt. | 111000 | MANIKGANJ |
| 5802 | MANIKGANJ MAHILA COLLEGE | MANIKGANJ | Govt. | | SHAHID RAFIQ ROAD |
| 5803 | MOTILAL COLLEGE | MANIKGANJ | Govt. | 110905 | Chakmirpur, DAULATPUR |
| 5804 | TALUKNAGAR COLLEGE | MANIKGANJ | Non Govt. | 110907 | TALUKNAGAR, TALUKNAGAR |
| 5805 | SINGAIR GOVT. COLLEGE | MANIKGANJ | Govt. | 111084 | SINGAIR, Singair |
| 5806 | GHIOR GOVT. COLLEGE | MANIKGANJ | Govt. | 110930 | GHIOR, MANIKGANJ |
| 5807 | TEROSREE COLLEGE | MANIKGANJ | Non Govt. | 110929 | TEROSREE |
| 5808 | M. A. RAUF COLLEGE | MANIKGANJ | Non Govt. | 110949 | CHALA, GALA |
| 5809 | MAHADEBPUR UNION GOVT. COLLEGE | MANIKGANJ | Govt. | 111053 | SHIBALAYA |
| 5810 | VIKU MEMO. GOVT. COLLEGE, DARGRAM | MANIKGANJ | Govt. | 111025 | DARGRAM |
| 5812 | KHAN BAHADUR AWLAD HOSSAIN KHAN COLLEGE | MANIKGANJ | Non Govt. | 110998 | PORRA, MANIKGANJ POURA AREA |
| 5814 | ADARSHA MAHABIDDALAYA | MANIKGANJ | Non Govt. | 111002 | BALIRTEK |
| 5815 | JHITKA KHAJA RAHMAT ALI DEGREE COLLEGE | MANIKGANJ | Non Govt. | 110947 | BASUDEBPUR, JHITKA |
| 5816 | BEGUM JARINA COLLEGE | MANIKGANJ | Non Govt. | 110999 | WEST DASHORA, MANIKGANJ |
| 5817 | SATURIA SYED KALU SHAH COLLEGE | MANIKGANJ | Non Govt. | 111027 | SATURIA |
| 5818 | KHONDOKAR NURUL HOSSAIN LAW ACADEMY | MANIKGANJ | Non Govt. | | SHAHID SARONI ROAD, MANIKGANJ |
| 5819 | IDEAL TEACHERS' TRAINING COLLEGE | MANIKGANJ | Non Govt. | 133290 | Bawtha Road, Manikgong |
| 5820 | BICHARPATI NURUL ISLAM DEGREE COLLEGE | MANIKGANJ | Govt. | 110948 | JATRAPUR |
| 5821 | SHIBALAYA SADARUDDIN DEGREE COLLEGE | MANIKGANJ | Non Govt. | 111054 | SHIBALAYA |
| 5822 | BACHAMARA BAGUTIA CHARKATARY (B B C) COLLEGE | MANIKGANJ | Non Govt. | 110906 | Daulatpur, Manikgong |
| 5823 | RAJIBPUR ADARSHA COLLEGE | MANIKGANJ | Non Govt. | 111003 | MANIKGANJ |
| 5824 | BAIRA COLLEGE | MANIKGANJ | Non Govt. | 111085 | BAIRA, SINGAIR |
| 5701 | GOVT. HARAGANGA COLLEGE | MUNSHIGANJ | Govt. | 111160 | COLLEGE ROAD |
| 5702 | GOVT. SREENAGAR COLLEGE | MUNSHIGANJ | Govt. | 111231 | SREENAGAR |
| 5703 | GOVT. BIKRAMPUR K. B. COLLEGE | MUNSHIGANJ | Govt. | 111200 | ICCHAPURA, SIRAJDIKHAN |
| 5704 | GAJARIA GOVT. COLLEGE | MUNSHIGANJ | Govt. | 111108 | GAJARIA, MUNSHIGANJ |
| 5705 | BIKRAMPUR ADARSHA COLLEGE | MUNSHIGANJ | Non Govt. | 111201 | KUCHIAMORA |
| 5706 | ADARSHA MAHABIDDALAYA | MUNSHIGANJ | Non Govt. | 111230 | KHARRA, CHURAIN |
| 5707 | MUNSHIGANJ LAW COLLEGE | MUNSHIGANJ | Non Govt. | | Sadar |
| 5708 | GOVT. LOHAJANG MAHABIDHALAYA | MUNSHIGANJ | Govt. | 111127 | BARANOWPARA |
| 5709 | RAMPAL COLLEGE | MUNSHIGANJ | Non Govt. | 111161 | RAMPAL |
| 5710 | GAZARIA KALIMULLAH COLLEGE | MUNSHIGANJ | Non Govt. | 111107 | BHABER CHAR, GAZARIA |
| 5711 | MIRKADIM HAJI AMJAD ALI COLLEGE | MUNSHIGANJ | Non Govt. | 132058 | ANAYET NAGAR, MIRKADIM |
| 5712 | MALKHANAGAR COLLEGE | MUNSHIGANJ | Non Govt. | 111202 | MALKHANAGAR |
| 5713 | BIKRAMPUR TONGIBARI GOVERNMENT COLLEGE | MUNSHIGANJ | Govt. | 111255 | RANGMEHAR |
| 5714 | ALI ASGAR AND ABDULLAH DEGREE COLLEGE | MUNSHIGANJ | Non Govt. | 111199 | GOPALPUR |
| 5601 | GOVT. TOLARAM COLLEGE | NARAYANGANJ | Govt. | 112478 | ALLAH MA IQBAL ROAD |
| 5602 | NARAYANGANJ MAHILA COLLEGE | NARAYANGANJ | Govt. | 112479 | 261, B. B. ROAD, CHASHARA |
| 5603 | NARAYANGANJ COLLEGE | NARAYANGANJ | Non Govt. | 112480 | 16 SIRAJDULLA ROAD |
| 5604 | GOVT. SAFAR ALI COLLEGE | NARAYANGANJ | Govt. | 112327 | ARAIHAZAR |
| 5605 | SONARGAON GOVT. COLLEGE | NARAYANGANJ | Govt. | 112369 | MOGRAPARA |
| 5606 | GOVT. MURAPARA COLLEGE | NARAYANGANJ | Govt. | 112535 | P/O: MURAPARA |
| 5607 | SONARGAON KAZI FAZLUL HAQUE WOMENS COLLEGE | NARAYANGANJ | Non Govt. | 112370 | BARANAGAR, SONARGAON |
| 5608 | SALIMUDDIN CHOWDHURY COLLEGE | NARAYANGANJ | Non Govt. | 112534 | KANCHAN, RUPGANJ |
| 5609 | HAJEE BALAYET HOSSION COLLEGE | NARAYANGANJ | Non Govt. | 112328 | UCHITPURA |
| 5610 | ROKANUDDIN MOLLA GIRLS' COLLEGE | NARAYANGANJ | Non Govt. | 112326 | CHOTTO BAROIPARA |
| 5611 | HAZI MISIR ALI DEGREE COLLEGE | NARAYANGANJ | Non Govt. | 112482 | DELPARA, KUTUBPUR |
| 5612 | NAZIMUDDIN BHUIYAN COLLEGE | NARAYANGANJ | Non Govt. | 112400 | MADANPUR, BANDAR |
| 5613 | NARAYANGANJ LAW COLLEGE | NARAYANGANJ | Non Govt. | | Sree Alladi Bibi Rd |
| 5614 | BANGLADESH COLLEGE OF PHYSICAL EDUCATION | NARAYANGANJ | N | | PUBERGAON, ATLAPUR BAZAR |
| 5615 | NARAYANGANJ FINE ART INSTITUTE | NARAYANGANJ | N | | MOMOTAJ BEGUM ROAD |
| 5616 | GOVT. KADAM RASUL DEGREE COLLEGE | NARAYANGANJ | Govt. | 112401 | BANDAR, NARAYANGANJ |
| 5617 | FATIMA RAHMAN TEACHERS' TRAINING COLLEGE | NARAYANGANJ | Non Govt. | 133607 | CHITTAGONGROAD |
| 5618 | HOSSAINPUR S.P. UNION COLLEGE | NARAYANGANJ | Non Govt. | 112371 | HOSSAINPUR, HOSSAINPUR |
| 5619 | BANGLADESH INSTITUTE OF BUSINESS & TECHNOLOGY (BIBT) | NARAYANGANJ | Non Govt. | | 2/4, ALLAMA IQBAL ROAD |
| 5620 | COLLEGE OF TECHNOLOGY (COT) | NARAYANGANJ | Non Govt. | 131882 | LINK ROAD |
| 5621 | PANCHRUKHI BEGUM ANOWARA COLLEGE | NARAYANGANJ | Non Govt. | 112329 | Panchrukhi, Arihazar |
| 5622 | SHANARPAR ROWSHAN ARA COLLEGE | NARAYANGANJ | Non Govt. | 112473 | NARAYANGANJ |
| 5623 | GOPALDI NAZRUL ISLAM BABU COLLEGE | NARAYANGANJ | Non Govt. | 134245 | ARAIHAZAR, NARAYANGANJ |
| 5401 | NARSINGDI GOVT. COLLEGE | NARSINGDI | Govt. | 112719 | BRAHMONDI, NARSINGDI |
| 5402 | NARSINGDI GOVT. MAHILA COLLEGE | NARSINGDI | Govt. | 112718 | WEST KANDA PARA |
| 5403 | MADHABDI COLLEGE | NARSINGDI | Non Govt. | 112715 | MADHABDI, NARSINGDI |
| 5404 | SHAHID ASAD GOVT. COLLEGE | NARSINGDI | Govt. | 112881 | DHANOA |
| 5405 | MONOHARDI GOVT. COLLEGE | NARSINGDI | Govt. | 112655 | MONOHARDI, NARSINGDI |
| 5406 | RAIPURA GOVERNMENT COLLEGE | NARSINGDI | Govt. | 112817 | RAIPURA |
| 5407 | PORADIA WASIM UDDIN KHAN DEGREE COLLEGE | NARSINGDI | Non Govt. | 112576 | PORADIA, BELABO |
| 5408 | NARAYANPUR RABEYA COLLEGE | NARSINGDI | Non Govt. | 112573 | NARAYANPUR |
| 5409 | PALASH SHILPANCHAL GOVERNMENT COLLEGE | NARSINGDI | Govt. | 112758 | PALASH |
| 5410 | HATIRDIA RAZIUDDIN COLLEGE | NARSINGDI | N | 112657 | HATIRDIA |
| 5411 | JOYNAGAR COLLEGE | NARSINGDI | Non Govt. | 112882 | JOYNAGAR |
| 5412 | AFAZUDDIN MAHILA COLLEGE | NARSINGDI | Non Govt. | 112653 | KATABARIA |
| 5413 | BARA CHAPA UNION ADARSHA COLLEGE | NARSINGDI | Non Govt. | 112654 | NOANAGAR |
| 5414 | PANCHKANDI DEGREE COLLEGE | NARSINGDI | Non Govt. | 112659 | PANCHKANDI, MONOHARDI |
| 5415 | GHORASHAL MUSA BIN HAKIM DEGREE COLLEGE | NARSINGDI | Non Govt. | 112757 | GHORASAL, PALASH |
| 5417 | NARSINGDI LAW COLLEGE | NARSINGDI | Non Govt. | | Vola Nagar, Narsindi |
| 5418 | NATIONAL COLLEGE OF EDUCATION | NARSINGDI | Non Govt. | | 205/3 WEST BRAHMONDI |
| 5419 | ABDUL MANNAN BHUIYAN COLLEGE | NARSINGDI | Non Govt. | 112883 | Bhurburia, Shibpur |
| 5420 | SHAHID SMRITY DEGREE COLLEGE | NARSINGDI | Non Govt. | 112759 | CHARNAGARDI |
| 5421 | BAROICHA COLLEGE | NARSINGDI | Non Govt. | 112574 | BAROICHA, DEWANER CHAR |
| 5422 | SARDAR ASMAT ALI MAHILA COLLEGE | NARSINGDI | Non Govt. | 112656 | MONOHARDI |
| 5423 | SABUJ PAHAR COLLEGE | NARSINGDI | Non Govt. | 112880 | Shibpur |
| 5424 | HAZI ABED ALI COLLEGE | NARSINGDI | Non Govt. | 112717 | EAST BRAHMONDI |
| 5425 | BARACHAPA COLLEGE | NARSINGDI | Non Govt. | 112652 | Monohardi |
| 5426 | KHIDIRPUR COLLEGE | NARSINGDI | Non Govt. | 112658 | MANOHARDI, NARSINGDI |
| 5427 | GOVT. HOSSAIN ALI COLLEGE | NARSINGDI | Govt. | 112575 | Belabo, Narsindi |
| 5901 | RAJBARI GOVT. COLLEGE | RAJBARI | Govt. | 113488 | RAJBARI |
| 5902 | GOVT. GOALONDA KAMRUL ISLAM COLLEGE | RAJBARI | Govt. | 113318 | UTTAR UJANCHAR |
| 5903 | RAJBARI GOVT. ADARSHA MAHILA COLLEGE | RAJBARI | Govt. | 113490 | SAJJANKANDA |
| 5904 | BALIAKANDI GOVT. COLLEGE | RAJBARI | Govt. | 113297 | BALIAKANDI, RAJBARI |
| 5905 | PANGSHA GOVT. COLLEGE | RAJBARI | Govt. | 113416 | PANGSA, RAJBARI |
| 5906 | MACHHPARA COLLEGE | RAJBARI | Non Govt. | 113418 | MACHPARA, RAMKOL |
| 5907 | MRIGI SHAHEED DIANAT COLLEGE | RAJBARI | Non Govt. | 113422 | MRIGI BAZAR, KALUKHALI |
| 5908 | KALUKHALI GOVT. COLLEGE | RAJBARI | Govt. | 113419 | RATANDIA |
| 5909 | MIR MOSHAROF HOSSAIN COLLEGE | RAJBARI | Non Govt. | 113298 | SONAPUR, BALIAKANDI |
| 5910 | MAJHBARI JAHANARA BEGUM COLLEGE | RAJBARI | Non Govt. | 113415 | MAJBARI, KALUKHALI |
| 5911 | MUNSUR ALI COLLEGE | RAJBARI | Non Govt. | 113282 | BAKSHADANGI, NARUA |
| 5912 | DR. ABUL HOSSAIN COLLEGE | RAJBARI | Non Govt. | 113489 | SAJJANKANDA |
| 5913 | RAJBARI TEACHERS'TRAINING COLLEGE | RAJBARI | Non Govt. | | South Bhabanipur |
| 5914 | MOHILA COLLEGE | RAJBARI | Non Govt. | 113421 | MAGURADANGI, PANGSHA |
| 5915 | RABEYA IDRIS MAHILA COLLEGE | RAJBARI | Non Govt. | 113319 | NASARUDDIN SARDER PARA |
| 5916 | DR. KAZI MOTAHAR HOSSAIN COLLEGE | RAJBARI | Non Govt. | 113414 | HABASHPUR |
| 5917 | ALHAZ AMZAD HOSSAIN DEGREE COLLEGE | RAJBARI | Non Govt. | 113413 | KASHBAMAJAIL |
| 5920 | JAMALPUR COLLEGE | RAJBARI | Non Govt. | 113296 | DANGAHATIMOHON |
| 5921 | BAHARPUR COLLEGE | RAJBARI | Non Govt. | 113299 | Bohor Pur, Baliakandi |
| 5922 | JATIR JANAK BANGABANDHU GOVT. COLLEGE | RAJBARI | Govt. | 113420 | Pangsha, Rajbari |
| 6201 | JATIR PITA BANGABANDHU SHEIKH MUJIBUR RAHMAN COLLEGE | SHARIATPUR | Govt. | 113647 | DHanuka, Palong |
| 6202 | NARIA GOVT. COLLEGE | SHARIATPUR | Govt. | 113608 | NARIA, SHARIATPUR |
| 6203 | GOVT. M. A. REZA COLLEGE, BHEDERGANJ | SHARIATPUR | Govt. | 113530 | BHEDERGANJ |
| 6204 | GOVT. PURBO MADARIPUR COLLEGE, DAMUDYA | SHARIATPUR | Govt. | 113552 | DAMUDYA |
| 6205 | JAZIRA COLLEGE | SHARIATPUR | Non Govt. | 113676 | DOKHIN BAIKSHA |
| 6206 | HAZI SHARIATULLAH COLLEGE | SHARIATPUR | Non Govt. | 113529 | SAKHIPUR |
| 6207 | DR. MOSLEM UDDIN KHAN COLLEGE | SHARIATPUR | Non Govt. | 113677 | JOYNAGAR, JAZIRA |
| 6208 | BHOJESWAR UPASY MAHABIDDALAYA | SHARIATPUR | Non Govt. | 113609 | UPASHI |
| 6209 | GOVT. SHAMSUR RAHMAN COLLEGE | SHARIATPUR | Govt. | 113575 | DASHARJONGLE |
| 6210 | GOVT. B.K. NAGAR BANGABANDHU COLLEGE | SHARIATPUR | Govt. | 113675 | B.K. NAGAR |
| 6211 | SIRAJ SIKDER COLLEGE | SHARIATPUR | Non Govt. | 113528 | D.M.KHALI |
| 6212 | GOVT. GOLAM HAIDER KHAN MOHILA COLLEGE | SHARIATPUR | Govt. | 113646 | PALONG |
| 6213 | HABIB ULLAH COLLEGE | SHARIATPUR | Non Govt. | 113531 | Bhedarganj, Shariatpur |
| 5301 | GOVT. SAADAT COLLEGE | TANGAIL | Govt. | 114747 | KARATIA |
| 5302 | GOVT. M. M. ALI COLLEGE | TANGAIL | Govt. | 114744 | KAGMARI, TANGAIL |
| 5303 | GOVT. SYED MOHABBAT ALI COLLEGE | TANGAIL | Govt. | 114105 | DELDUAR |
| 5304 | LION NAZRUL ISLAM DEGREE COLLEGE | TANGAIL | Non Govt. | 114741 | |
| 5306 | SHAMSHER FAKIR COLLEGE | TANGAIL | Non Govt. | 114063 | NIKRAIL |
| 5307 | GOVT. KUMUDINI COLLEGE | TANGAIL | Govt. | 114743 | MYMENSHING ROAD |
| 5308 | GHATAIL BRAHMANSHASON GOVT. COLLEGE | TANGAIL | Govt. | 114197 | GHATAIL |
| 5309 | NAGARPUR GOVT. COLLEGE | TANGAIL | Govt. | 114591 | TANGAIL |
| 5310 | GOPALPUR GOVT. COLLEGE | TANGAIL | Govt. | 114273 | GOPALPUR |
| 5311 | HEMNAGAR COLLEGE | TANGAIL | Non Govt. | 114270 | HEMNAGAR |
| 5312 | KALIHATI SHAJAHAN SIRAJ COLLEGE | TANGAIL | Non Govt. | 114351 | KALIHATI, TANGAIL |
| 5313 | GOVT. SHAMSUL HAQUE COLLEGE, ELENGA | TANGAIL | Govt. | 114352 | ELENGA |
| 5314 | MIRZAPUR GOVERNMENT COLLEGE | TANGAIL | Govt. | 114525 | MIRZAPUR |
| 5315 | ALAUDDIN SIDDIQUI COLLEGE | TANGAIL | Non Govt. | 114353 | AULIABAD |
| 5316 | MADHUPUR GOVT. COLLEGE | TANGAIL | Govt. | 114455 | MADHUPUR |
| 5317 | DHANBARI GOVT. COLLEGE | TANGAIL | Govt. | 114456 | DHANBARI |
| 5318 | ASYA HASAN ALI MAHILA COLLEGE | TANGAIL | Non Govt. | 114454 | DHANBARI, TANGAIL |
| 5319 | BASAIL DEGREE COLLEGE | TANGAIL | Non Govt. | 114012 | BASAIL |
| 5320 | IBRAHIM KHAN GOVT. COLLEGE | TANGAIL | Govt. | 114064 | BHUAPUR |
| 5321 | GOVERNMENT MUJIB COLLEGE, SAKHIPUR | TANGAIL | Govt. | 114674 | KADER NAGAR |
| 5322 | MAJ. GEN. MAHMUDUL HASAN ADARSHA COLLEGE | TANGAIL | Non Govt. | 114107 | ADALOT ROAD |
| 5323 | NAGARPUR MAHILA COLLEGE | TANGAIL | Non Govt. | 114588 | NAGARPUR |
| 5324 | MOWLANA ABDUL HAMID KHAN BHASANI COLLEGE | TANGAIL | Non Govt. | 114106 | ELASHIN |
| 5325 | MAJ. GEN. MAHMUDUL HASAN DEGREE COLLEGE | TANGAIL | Non Govt. | 114748 | ANUHALA |
| 5326 | SHAKHIPUR RESIDENTIAL MAHILA COLLEGE | TANGAIL | Non Govt. | 114675 | SAKHIPUR |
| 5327 | LOKMAN FAKIR MAHILA DEGREE COLLEGE | TANGAIL | Non Govt. | 114065 | BHUAPUR |
| 5328 | GLOBAL INSTITUTE OF INFORMATION TECHNOLOGY | TANGAIL | Non Govt. | | GIIT |
| 5329 | MAHERUNNESHA MOHILA COLLEGE, GOPALPUR | TANGAIL | Non Govt. | 114271 | AVUNGI, GOPALPUR |
| 5330 | SHAHID ZIA MOHILA COLLEGE | TANGAIL | Non Govt. | 114067 | BHUAPUR, TANGAIL |
| 5331 | HAJI ABUL HOSSAIN INSTITUTE OF TECHNOLOGY (HABHIT) | TANGAIL | Non Govt. | | HOSSAIN COMPLEX |
| 5332 | TANGAIL LAW COLLEGE | TANGAIL | Non Govt. | | Victoria Road |
| 5333 | TANGAIL TEACHERS' TRAINING COLLEGE | TANGAIL | Non Govt. | | KAGMARI ROAD |
| 5334 | B. C. R. G. COLLEGE, PAKUTIA | TANGAIL | Non Govt. | 114589 | PAKUTIA |
| 5335 | SHEHAB UDDIN DEGREE COLLEGE | TANGAIL | Non Govt. | 114066 | FALDA |
| 5336 | PANCHPOTAL DEGREE COLLEGE | TANGAIL | Non Govt. | 114457 | PANCHPOTAL |
| 5337 | ARFAN KHAN MEMORIAL COLLEGE, LOWHATI | TANGAIL | Non Govt. | 114104 | LOWHATI |
| 5338 | GOVT. SHEIKH FAZILATUN NESA MUJIB MOHILA COLLEGE | TANGAIL | Govt. | 114742 | ZELLA SADER ROAD |
| 5339 | KHANDAKER FAZLUL HAQUE COLLEGE | TANGAIL | Non Govt. | 114269 | Gopalpur |
| 5340 | KHALILUR RAHMAN COLLEGE | TANGAIL | Non Govt. | 114524 | Mirzapur |
| 5341 | UKHARIABARI COLLEGE | TANGAIL | Non Govt. | 114453 | Dhanbari |
| 5342 | HATIA COLLEGE | TANGAIL | Non Govt. | 114672 | Hatea, Hatea Rajabai |
| 5343 | SHAHID RAUSHAN ALI KHAN COLLEGE | TANGAIL | Non Govt. | 114014 | BASAIL |
| 5344 | JANATA COLLEGE | TANGAIL | Non Govt. | 114587 | Nagarpur |
| 5345 | LUTFOR RAHMAN MATIN MOHILA DEGREE COLLEGE | TANGAIL | Non Govt. | 114350 | Rajabari, Kalihati |
| 5346 | BARACHOWNA KUTUBPUR COLLEGE | TANGAIL | Non Govt. | 114671 | Sakhipur |
| 5347 | BHAIGHAT IDEAL COLLEGE | TANGAIL | Non Govt. | 114458 | DHANBARI |
| 5348 | RAZABARI COLLEGE | TANGAIL | Non Govt. | 114528 | Mirzapur |
| 5349 | MIRZAPUR MOHILA COLLEGE | TANGAIL | Non Govt. | 114526 | MIRZAPUR |
| 5350 | BOALI COLLEGE | TANGAIL | Non Govt. | 114670 | Boali, Tangail |
| 5351 | BRAHMON SHASHON MOHILA COLLEGE | TANGAIL | Non Govt. | 114198 | TANGAIL |
| 5352 | SHAHEED SHAHED HAZARI COLLEGE | TANGAIL | Non Govt. | 131690 | KALIHATI, SATIHATI |
| 5353 | MAWLANA BHASHANI ADARSHA COLLEGE | TANGAIL | Non Govt. | 114745 | Tangail Sadar |
| 5354 | SHOLAKURI COLLEGE | TANGAIL | Non Govt. | 135305 | Modhupur |

== Rangpur Region ==
| College Code | College Name | District | College Type | EIIN | Address |
|---|---|---|---|---|---|
| 3401 | DINAJPUR GOVT. COLLEGE | DINAJPUR | Govt. | 120818 | SUIHARI |
| 3402 | PARBATIPUR ADARSHA COLLEGE | DINAJPUR | Non Govt. | 121058 | NUTONBAZAR |
| 3403 | DINAJPUR GOVT. MAHILA COLLEGE | DINAJPUR | Govt. | 120822 | SOUTH BALUBARI |
| 3404 | NAWABGANJ MAHILA COLLEGE | DINAJPUR | Non Govt. | 120943 | NAWABGONJ |
| 3405 | K. B. M. COLLEGE | DINAJPUR | Non Govt. | 120816 | PULHAT |
| 3406 | ADARSHA COLLEGE | DINAJPUR | Non Govt. | 120820 | GASHIPARA |
| 3407 | DAUDPUR COLLEGE | DINAJPUR | Non Govt. | 120938 | DAUDPUR, NAWABGANJ |
| 3408 | PARBATIPUR DEGREE COLLEGE | DINAJPUR | Govt. | 121058 | ABBASPARA |
| 3409 | BIROL GOVT. COLLEGE | DINAJPUR | Govt. | 120197 | Thana- Birol |
| 3410 | PHOOLBARI GOVT. COLLEGE | DINAJPUR | Govt. | 120451 | PHOOLBARI |
| 3411 | BIRAMPUR GOVT. COLLEGE | DINAJPUR | Govt. | 120021 | BIRAMPUR |
| 3412 | AFTABGANJ DEGREE COLLEGE, NAWABGANJ | DINAJPUR | Govt. | 120942 | Non Govt.AWAB GANJ |
| 3413 | NAWABGANJ COLLEGE | DINAJPUR | Non Govt. | 120941 | Non Govt.AWABGONJ |
| 3414 | HAKIMPUR DEGREE COLLEGE | DINAJPUR | Govt. | 120538 | BANGLAHILI |
| 3415 | GHORAGHAT GOVT. COLLEGE | DINAJPUR | Govt. | 120499 | OSMANPUR |
| 3416 | RANIGANJ MAHILA COLLEGE | DINAJPUR | Non Govt. | 120500 | SINGRA, HATSHYAMGANJ |
| 3417 | BIRGANJ GOVT. COLLEGE | DINAJPUR | Govt. | 120127 | BIRGANJ, DINAJPUR |
| 3418 | SETABGANJ GOVT. COLLEGE | DINAJPUR | Govt. | 120267 | SETABGANJ |
| 3419 | ICHHAMATI COLLEGE, RANIRBANDAR | DINAJPUR | Non Govt. | 120393 | RANIRBANDAR |
| 3420 | CHIRIBANDER GOVT. COLLEGE | DINAJPUR | Govt. | 120392 | CHIRIRBANDAR |
| 3421 | PAKERHAT GOVERNMENT COLLEGE | DINAJPUR | Govt. | 120696 | PAKERHAT, KHANSHAMA |
| 3422 | BHABANIPUR COLLEGE, PARBATIPUR | DINAJPUR | Non Govt. | 121061 | BHABANIPUR BAZAR |
| 3423 | AMBARI COLLEGE | DINAJPUR | Non Govt. | 121060 | AMBARI, PARBATIPUR |
| 3424 | MOGARPARA DEGREE COLLEGE | DINAJPUR | Non Govt. | 120940 | POST. MOGARPARA |
| 3425 | BIRAMPUR MAHILA COLLEGE | DINAJPUR | Non Govt. | 120022 | BIRAMPUR |
| 3426 | GHORAGHAT MAHILA COLLEGE | DINAJPUR | Non Govt. | 120501 | GHORAGHAT, DINAJPUR |
| 3427 | PANCHBARI MOKHLESUR RAHMAN COLLEGE | DINAJPUR | Non Govt. | 120823 | PANCHBARI |
| 3428 | PHOOLBARI MAHILA COLLEGE | DINAJPUR | Non Govt. | 120452 | PHULBARI |
| 3429 | SHAHID SMRITI ADARSHA COLLEGE | DINAJPUR | Non Govt. | 120450 | PHULBARI, DINAJPUR |
| 3430 | MAINUL HASSAN MAHABIDDALAYA | DINAJPUR | Non Govt. | 120199 | MANGALPUR, BIRAL |
| 3431 | KHOLAHATI COLLEGE | DINAJPUR | Non Govt. | 121056 | SHENANIBAS |
| 3432 | PARBATIPUR MAHILA COLLEGE | DINAJPUR | Non Govt. | 121062 | PARBATIPUR |
| 3433 | HAKIMPUR WOMEN'S COLLEGE | DINAJPUR | Non Govt. | 120539 | BANGLA HILI |
| 3434 | JOYNANDA DEGREE COLLEGE | DINAJPUR | Non Govt. | 120601 | JOYNANDA HAT |
| 3435 | DINAJPUR SANGEET COLLEGE | DINAJPUR | Non Govt. | 120821 | CHAKBAZAR |
| 3436 | MONMATHPUR IDEAL COLLEGE | DINAJPUR | Non Govt. | 121057 | MONMATHPUR |
| 3437 | ICHHAMOTI WOMEN'S COLLEGE | DINAJPUR | Non Govt. | 120388 | RANIRBANDAR |
| 3438 | KAHAROL WOMENS DEGREE COLLEGE | DINAJPUR | Non Govt. | 120602 | |
| 3439 | KATLA DEGREE COLLEGE | DINAJPUR | Non Govt. | 120023 | KATLAHAT |
| 3440 | HOSENPUR COLLEGE | DINAJPUR | Non Govt. | 120700 | HOSENPUR |
| 3441 | DINAJPUR LAW COLLEGE | DINAJPUR | Non Govt. | | Sadar |
| 3442 | PARBATIPUR B.ED. COLLEGE | DINAJPUR | Non Govt. | | Parbatipur |
| 3443 | DINAJPUR SHIKKHAK PROSHIKHAN COLLEGE | DINAJPUR | Non Govt. | | Bawbari |
| 3444 | CHANDGANG DEGREE COLLEGE | DINAJPUR | Non Govt. | 120824 | MUJAHIDPUR |
| 3445 | KHANSAMA DEGREE COLLEGE | DINAJPUR | Non Govt. | 120697 | GOBINDOPUR |
| 3446 | KAHAROL GOVT. COLLEGE | DINAJPUR | Govt. | 120600 | MOHARAJGONJ |
| 3447 | BIRGONJ MOHILA COLLEGE | DINAJPUR | Non Govt. | 120125 | BIRGANJ, DINAJPUR |
| 3448 | BIRAL MOHILA COLLEGE | DINAJPUR | Non Govt. | 120201 | BIROL, DINAJPUR |
| 3449 | GOLAPGONJ DEGREE COLLEGE | DINAJPUR | Non Govt. | 120128 | GOLAPGONJ HAT |
| 3450 | KARENTHAT DEGREE COLLEGE | DINAJPUR | Non Govt. | 120394 | CHIRIRBANDOR |
| 3451 | DEOGAON BOKULTALA COLLEGE | DINAJPUR | Non Govt. | 120268 | BATASON, MURARIPUR |
| 3452 | KHANSAMA WOMENS COLLEGE | DINAJPUR | Non Govt. | 120699 | KHANSAMA |
| 3453 | PURBA MOLLIKPUR WOMENS COLLEGE | DINAJPUR | Non Govt. | 120604 | SUNDARPUR |
| 3454 | KANCHAN NEW MODEL COLLEGE | DINAJPUR | Non Govt. | | KANCHAN, BIROL |
| 3455 | JAGATPUR COLLEGE | DINAJPUR | Non Govt. | | boznapur, birol |
| 3456 | AFTABGANJ MOHILA COLLEGE | DINAJPUR | Non Govt. | 120939 | CHAKMOHON, AFTABGANJ |
| 3457 | BANGABANDHU GOVT. COLLEGE | DINAJPUR | Govt. | 120449 | Betdighi, Fulbari |
| 3458 | HATRAMPUR COLLEGE | DINAJPUR | Non Govt. | 120269 | Bochaganj |
| 3459 | DAXMIN KOTOALI COLLEGE | DINAJPUR | Non Govt. | 120817 | DINAJPUR SADAR |
| 3460 | S. F LIBRARY & INFORMATION SCIENCE COLLEGE | DINAJPUR | Non Govt. | | SADAR, DINAJPUR |
| 3461 | CHIRIRBANDAR WOMEN'S COLLEGE | DINAJPUR | Non Govt. | 120392 | |
| 3301 | GAIBANDHA GOVT. COLLEGE | GAIBANDHA | Govt. | 121184 | THANA PARA |
| 3302 | GAIBANDHA GOVT. MAHILA COLLEGE | GAIBANDHA | Govt. | 121183 | D.B ROAD |
| 3303 | GAIBANDHA ADARSHA COLLEGE | GAIBANDHA | Non Govt. | 121185 | POUROSHOVA |
| 3304 | BONARPARA GOVT. COLLEGE | GAIBANDHA | Govt. | 121610 | BONARPARA |
| 3305 | SUNDARGANJ DEED WRITER GOVT. COLLEGE | GAIBANDHA | Govt. | 121755 | SUNDARGANJ |
| 3306 | KAMDIA NURUL HAQUE DEGREE COLLEGE | GAIBANDHA | Non Govt. | 121351 | KAMDIA, KAMDIA |
| 3307 | GOVINDAGANJ MAHILA COLLEGE | GAIBANDHA | Non Govt. | 121349 | GOBINDAGANJ |
| 3308 | GOBINDAGANJ GOVERNMENT COLLEGE | GAIBANDHA | Govt. | 121347 | BORDHANKUTI |
| 3309 | SADULLAPUR GOVT. COLLEGE | GAIBANDHA | Govt. | 121539 | SADULLAPUR |
| 3310 | NOLDANGA COLLEGE | GAIBANDHA | Non Govt. | 121538 | NALDANGA |
| 3311 | PALASHBARI GOVT. COLLEGE | GAIBANDHA | Govt. | 121426 | PALASHBARI |
| 3312 | POLASH BARI ADARSHA COLLEGE | GAIBANDHA | Non Govt. | 121425 | PALASHBARI |
| 3313 | SHAH AJGAR ALI COLLEGE | GAIBANDHA | Non Govt. | 121537 | DHAPERHAT |
| 3314 | SUNDARGANJ MAHILA COLLEGE | GAIBANDHA | Non Govt. | 121757 | SUNDARGANJ |
| 3315 | DHARMAPUR ABDUL JABBAR COLLEGE | GAIBANDHA | Non Govt. | 121754 | DHARMAPUR |
| 3316 | BELKA COLLEGE | GAIBANDHA | Non Govt. | 121759 | BELKA |
| 3317 | SAGHATA COLLEGE | GAIBANDHA | Non Govt. | 121609 | SAGHATA |
| 3318 | PHOOLCHHARI GOVT. COLLEGE | GAIBANDHA | Govt. | 121099 | BHARATKHALI |
| 3319 | SHAHARGACHI ADARSHA DEGREE COLLEGE | GAIBANDHA | Non Govt. | 121352 | SHAHARGACHI |
| 3320 | TULSHI GHAT SHAMSOL HAQUE DEGREE COLLEGE | GAIBANDHA | Non Govt. | 121182 | TULSHIGHAT |
| 3321 | SOBHAGANJ DEGREE COLLEGE | GAIBANDHA | Non Govt. | 121758 | SOBHAGANJ |
| 3322 | KONCHIPARA MAHABIDYALAY | GAIBANDHA | Non Govt. | 121098 | KONCHIPARA, BHOWANIGONJ |
| 3323 | GAIBANDHA LAW COLLEGE | GAIBANDHA | Non Govt. | 133391 | |
| 3324 | SADULLAPUR GIRL'S COLLEGE | GAIBANDHA | Non Govt. | 121542 | SADULLAPUR |
| 3325 | GOBINDAGANJ SHIKKHAK PROSHIKHAN COLLEGE | GAIBANDHA | Non Govt. | 133761 | SHAPTABARNA |
| 3326 | SAFIA-ASAB B. P. ED. & LIBRARY & INFORMATION SCIENCE COLLEGE | GAIBANDHA | Non Govt. | | MOHIMAGONJ ROAD |
| 3327 | FAKIRHAT SHAHID SMRITI DEGREE COLLEGE | GAIBANDHA | Non Govt. | 121427 | BALABAMUNIA |
| 3328 | HAJI OSMAN GANI COLLEGE | GAIBANDHA | Non Govt. | 121186 | HAT DARIAPUR |
| 3329 | MOHIMAGONJ COLLEGE | GAIBANDHA | Non Govt. | 121350 | MOHIMAGONJ |
| 3330 | DHUBNI KANCHIBARI DEGREE COLLEGE | GAIBANDHA | Non Govt. | 121676 | DHUBNI BAZAR |
| 3331 | BAMANDANGA ABDUL HAQUE COLLEGE | GAIBANDHA | Non Govt. | 121756 | MONMOTH |
| 3332 | MOHIPUR BAZAR COLLEGE | GAIBANDHA | Non Govt. | | MOHIPUR BAZAR, SADULLAPUR |
| 3333 | UDAYAN WOMENS COLLEGE | GAIBANDHA | Non Govt. | 121608 | PUTIMARI, KHAMAR DHANARUHA |
| 3334 | PALASHBARI WOMENS COLLEGE | GAIBANDHA | Non Govt. | | PALASHBARI |
| 3335 | JUMARBARI ADARSHA COLLEGE | GAIBANDHA | Non Govt. | 121611 | SAGHATA |
| 3336 | NAKAIHAT COLLEGE | GAIBANDHA | Non Govt. | 121344 | GOBINDAGANJ |
| 3001 | KURIGRAM GOVT. COLLEGE | KURIGRAM | Govt. | 122331 | KURIGRAM |
| 3002 | ULIPUR GOVT. COLLEGE | KURIGRAM | Govt. | 122707 | ULIPUR |
| 3003 | RAJIBPUR DEGREE COLLEGE | KURIGRAM | Govt. | 122146 | BORAY DANGI |
| 3004 | ULIPUR MAHILA COLLEGE | KURIGRAM | Non Govt. | 122708 | ULIPUR |
| 3005 | KURIGRAM GOVT. MAHILA COLLEGE | KURIGRAM | Govt. | 122330 | SADOR |
| 3006 | GOVT. MIR ISMAIL HOSSAIN COLLEGE | KURIGRAM | Govt. | 122534 | RAJARHAT |
| 3007 | NAGESHWARI GOVT. COLLEGE | KURIGRAM | Govt. | 122452 | PASCHIM NAGESWARI |
| 3008 | NAGESWARI MAHILA COLLEGE | KURIGRAM | Non Govt. | 122453 | NAGESWARI |
| 3009 | BHURUNGAMARI GOVT. COLLEGE | KURIGRAM | Govt. | 122122 | DEWANAR KHAMAR |
| 3010 | ROWMARI GOVT. COLLEGE | KURIGRAM | Govt. | 122579 | ROWMARI |
| 3011 | CHILMARI COLLEGE | KURIGRAM | Govt. | 122177 | CHILMARI, CHILMARI |
| 3012 | PHOOLBARI COLLEGE | KURIGRAM | Non Govt. | 122238 | FULBARI, KURIGRA |
| 3013 | MAJIDA ADARSHA DEGREE COLLEGE | KURIGRAM | Non Govt. | 122332 | MOLLAPARA |
| 3014 | BHETERBANDH COLLEGE | KURIGRAM | Non Govt. | 122454 | BHITARBANDH |
| 3015 | CHILMARI MAHILA COLLEGE | KURIGRAM | Non Govt. | 122178 | CHILMARI, KURIGRAM |
| 3016 | GOLAM HABIB MAHILA COLLEGE | KURIGRAM | Non Govt. | 122178 | SABUJ PARA, CHILMARI |
| 3017 | KOTCHAKATA COLLEGE | KURIGRAM | Non Govt. | 122455 | KOCHAKATA |
| 3018 | PULLBARI MAHILA COLLEGE | KURIGRAM | Non Govt. | 122240 | FUBARI |
| 3019 | RAIGONJ COLLEGE | KURIGRAM | Non Govt. | 122456 | RAYGONJ |
| 3020 | PANCHPIR DEGREE COLLEGE | KURIGRAM | Non Govt. | 122709 | PANCHPIR |
| 3021 | BHURUNGAMARI MOHILA DEGREE COLLEGE | KURIGRAM | Non Govt. | 122123 | DEWANAR KHAMAR |
| 3022 | RAJARHAT MOHILA DEGREE COLLEGE | KURIGRAM | Non Govt. | 122536 | RAJARHAT |
| 3023 | KURIGRAM LAW COLLEGE | KURIGRAM | Non Govt. | | KURIGRAM-CHILMARI ROAD |
| 3024 | KANTHAL BARI COLLEGE | KURIGRAM | Non Govt. | 122333 | KANTHAL BARI |
| 3025 | KURIGRAM TEACHERS' TRAINING COLLEGE | KURIGRAM | Non Govt. | 133653 | Sadar, Kurigram |
| 3026 | ROWMARI WOMEN'S COLLEGE | KURIGRAM | Non Govt. | 122580 | ROWMARI |
| 3027 | KASHIPUR DEGREE COLLEGE | KURIGRAM | Non Govt. | 122239 | GONGERHAT, FULBARI |
| 3028 | SHONAHAT COLLEGE | KURIGRAM | Non Govt. | 122124 | BHURUNGAMARI |
| 3029 | CHARSHOULMARI DEGREE COLLEGE | KURIGRAM | Non Govt. | 122581 | CHAR SHOUL MARI |
| 3030 | GUNAIGACHH DEGREE COLLEGE | KURIGRAM | Non Govt. | 122710 | Gunaigachh, Ulipur |
| 3031 | BOZRA L K AMIN DEGREE COLLEGE | KURIGRAM | Non Govt. | 137002 | BOZRA HAT, Ulipur |
| 3032 | JADURCHAR DEGREE COLLEGE | KURIGRAM | Non Govt. | 122583 | Jadur Char, Rowmari |
| 3033 | JADUR CHAR MODEL DEGREE COLLEGE | KURIGRAM | Non Govt. | 122582 | Rawmari, Kurigram |
| 3034 | BALDIA COLLEGE | KURIGRAM | Non Govt. | 137757 | |
| 2901 | LALMONIRHAT GOVT. COLLEGE | LALMONIRHAT | Govt. | 122988 | TALUK, KHUTAMARA |
| 2902 | MAJIDA KHATUN MAHILA COLLEGE | LALMONIRHAT | Govt. | 122989 | LALMONIRHAT |
| 2903 | ADITMARI GOVT. COLLEGE | LALMONIRHAT | Govt. | 122767 | ADITMARI, LALMONIRHAT. |
| 2904 | GOVT. KARIMUDDIN PUBLIC COLLEGE | LALMONIRHAT | Govt. | 122892 | KARIMPUR, KALIGONJ |
| 2905 | JASUMUDDIN KAZI A. GHANI COLLEGE | LALMONIRHAT | Govt. | 123027 | RASULGONJ |
| 2906 | HATIBANDHA ALIMUDDIN COLLEGE | LALMONIRHAT | Govt. | 122829 | |
| 2907 | UTTAR BANGLA COLLEGE, KAKINA | LALMONIRHAT | Non Govt. | 122891 | Kakina, kaligonj |
| 2908 | SHAMSUDDIN KAMARUDDIN COLLEGE | LALMONIRHAT | Non Govt. | 122893 | CHAPARHAT, KALIGONJ |
| 2909 | SAPTIBARI COLLEGE | LALMONIRHAT | Non Govt. | 122768 | SAPTIBARI |
| 2910 | TEESTA COLLEGE | LALMONIRHAT | Non Govt. | 122985 | TEESTA |
| 2911 | HATIBANDHA WOMEN'S COLLEGE | LALMONIRHAT | Non Govt. | 122830 | SIGGIMARI |
| 2912 | LALMONIRHAT ADARSHA DEGREE COLLEGE | LALMONIRHAT | Non Govt. | 122990 | SAPTANA ROAD |
| 2913 | PATGRAM ADARSHA DEGREE COLLEGE | LALMONIRHAT | Non Govt. | 123026 | PATGRAM |
| 2914 | PATGRAM WOMEN'S COLLEGE | LALMONIRHAT | Non Govt. | 123028 | PATGRAM |
| 2915 | LALMONIRHAT LAW COLLEGE | LALMONIRHAT | Non Govt. | 133756 | Sadar |
| 2916 | SHAHED ABUL KASHEM COLLEGE | LALMONIRHAT | Non Govt. | 122991 | BARABARI |
| 2917 | BEGUM KAMRUNNESSA COLLEGE | LALMONIRHAT | Non Govt. | 122987 | DURAKUTI, Bhelabari |
| 2918 | DAIKHAWA ADERSHA COLLEGE | LALMONIRHAT | Non Govt. | 122827 | DAIKHAWA |
| 2919 | BARAKHATA DEGREE COLLEGE | LALMONIRHAT | Non Govt. | 122826 | BARAKHATA |
| 2920 | UTTRAN COLLEGE | LALMONIRHAT | Non Govt. | 122890 | BHOTMARI |
| 2921 | TUSHBHANDAR MOHILA COLLEGE | LALMONIRHAT | Non Govt. | 122894 | KALIGANJ |
| 3101 | NILPHAMARI GOVT. COLLEGE | NILPHAMARI | Govt. | 125189 | HAROWA |
| 3102 | CHILAHATI GOVT. COLLEGE | NILPHAMARI | Govt. | 124893 | CHILAHATI |
| 3103 | NILPHAMARI GOVT. MAHILA COLLEGE | NILPHAMARI | Govt. | 125188 | NILPHAMARI |
| 3104 | DOMAR GOVT. COLLEGE | NILPHAMARI | Govt. | 124892 | DOMAR |
| 3105 | JOLDHAKA GOVT. COLLEGE | NILPHAMARI | Govt. | 124977 | JALDHAKA |
| 3106 | SAIDPUR GOVT. COLLEGE | NILPHAMARI | Govt. | 125243 | KUNDOL, SAIDPUR |
| 3107 | DIMLA ISLAMIA COLLEGE | NILPHAMARI | Non Govt. | 124824 | SOUTH TIT PARA |
| 3108 | MASHIUR RAHMAN DEGREE COLLEGE | NILPHAMARI | Non Govt. | 125190 | SAIDPUR ROAD |
| 3109 | SHIMUL BARI BANGABANDHU GOVERNMENT COLLEGE | NILPHAMARI | Govt. | 124978 | JALDHAKA |
| 3110 | CHANDERHAT COLLEGE | NILPHAMARI | Non Govt. | 753647 | CHANDERHAT |
| 3111 | SONAROY SONGOLSHI COLLEGE | NILPHAMARI | Non Govt. | 125191 | SONGOLSHI |
| 3112 | DOMAR WOMEN'S DEGREE COLLEGE | NILPHAMARI | Non Govt. | 124896 | CHIKANMATI |
| 3113 | KAMARPUKUR COLLEGE | NILPHAMARI | Non Govt. | 125245 | KAMARPUKUR, SAIDPUR |
| 3114 | DIMLA GOVT. MOHILA COLLEGE | NILPHAMARI | Govt. | 124827 | DIMLA |
| 3115 | JANATA COLLEGE | NILPHAMARI | Non Govt. | 124825 | KHAGAKHAGRI BARI |
| 3116 | SAIDPUR MOHILA COLLEGE | NILPHAMARI | Non Govt. | 125244 | MONSHE PARA |
| 3117 | RABEYA CHAWDHURY WOMEN'S DEGREE COLLEGE | ILPHAMARI | Non Govt. | 124976 | jaldhaka |
| 3118 | KISORIGONJ DEGREE COLLEGE | NILPHAMARI | Govt. | 125053 | KISHOREGANJ |
| 3119 | NILPHAMARI TEACHERS' TRAINING COLLEGE | NILPHAMARI | Non Govt. | | SADAR |
| 3120 | TISTA COLLEGE | NILPHAMARI | Non Govt. | 124826 | DALIA |
| 3121 | MIRGONJ HAT COLLEGE | NILPHAMARI | Non Govt. | 124979 | MIRGONJHAT |
| 3122 | PALASHBARI COLLEGE | NILPHAMARI | Non Govt. | 125192 | PALASHBARI |
| 3123 | TENGONMARI COLLEGE | NILPHAMARI | Non Govt. | 135340 | KHUTAMARA |
| 3124 | RADHARANI MOHILA DEGREE COLLEGE | NILPHAMARI | Non Govt. | 125054 | KELLABARI |
| 3125 | GOMNATI MOHABIDDALAY | NILPHAMARI | Non Govt. | | domar |
| 3126 | ANORMARI DEGREE COLLEGE | NILPHAMARI | Non Govt. | | koimari, kishorigang |
| 3127 | SHAHID ZIAUR RAHMAN COLLEGE | NILPHAMARI | Non Govt. | 133764 | Chapani, Dimla |
| 3128 | IDEAL COLLEGE | Non Govt.ILPHAMARI | Non Govt. | 124981 | jaldhaka Nilphamari |
| 3601 | MOQBULAR RAHMAN GOVT. COLLEGE | PANCHAGARH | Govt. | 126147 | DOCROPARA, PANCHAGARH |
| 3602 | PANCHAGARH GOVT. MAHILA COLLEGE | PANCHAGARH | Govt. | 126148 | PANCHAGARH |
| 3603 | BHAJANPUR DEGREE COLLEGE | PANCHAGARH | Non Govt. | 126192 | P.O.BHAJANPUR |
| 3604 | PATHRAJ GOVERNMENT COLLEGE | PANCHAGARH | Govt. | 125973 | COLLEGE PARA |
| 3605 | DEBIGANJ GOVT. COLLEGE | PANCHAGARH | Govt. | 126047 | DEBIGANJ |
| 3606 | MIRZA GOLAM HAFIZ COLLEGE | PANCHAGARH | Non Govt. | 125864 | CHOTODAP, ATWARI |
| 3607 | AMLAHAR COLLEGE, PANCHAGARH | PANCHAGARH | Non Govt. | 126150 | AMLAHAR |
| 3608 | SHAHID ZIAUR RAHMAN COLLEGE | PANCHAGARH | Non Govt. | 126149 | TUNIRHAT |
| 3609 | SAKOWA COLLEGE | PANCHAGARH | Non Govt. | 125974 | SAKOWA |
| 3610 | BODA WOMEN COLLEGE | PANCHAGARH | Non Govt. | 125976 | THANAPARA, BODA |
| 3611 | BALARAMPUR ADARSHA COLLEGE | PANCHAGARH | Non Govt. | 125866 | ARAZI MONDAL HAT |
| 3612 | BARRISTER JAMIR UDDIN SIRCAR INSTITUTE | PANCHAGARH | Non Govt. | 132011 | SHINGPARA |
| 3613 | TETULIA MAHABIDALAYA | PANCHAGARH | Govt. | 126193 | TETULIA |
| 3614 | MAIDANDIGHI DEGREE COLLEGE | PANCHAGARH | Non Govt. | 125975 | MAIDANDIGHI |
| 3615 | JAGDAL COLLEGE | PANCHAGARH | Non Govt. | 126151 | JAGDAL |
| 3616 | MAJHIPARA MOHILA COLLEGE | PANCHAGARH | Non Govt. | 126194 | MAJHIPARA |
| 3617 | BAGDAHA COLLEGE | PANCHAGARH | Non Govt. | 135313 | BAGDAHA |
| 3618 | DEBIGANJ MOHILA COLLEGE | PANCHAGARH | Non Govt. | 126050 | DEBIGANJ SADAR |
| 3619 | ATWARI ADARSHA WOMENS COLLEGE | PANCHAGARH | Non Govt. | 125865 | ATWARI, PANCHAGARH |
| 3620 | BHAULAGONJ DEGREE COLLEGE | PANCHAGARH | Non Govt. | 126048 | Bhaulaganj, Debiganj |
| 3201 | CARMICHAEL COLLEGE | RANGPUR | Govt. | 127489 | MEDICAL PAKARMATHA |
| 3202 | SHYAMPUR COLLEGE | RANGPUR | Non Govt. | 127490 | SHYAMPUR |
| 3203 | GANGACHARA GOVT. COLLEGE | RANGPUR | Govt. | 127298 | Non Govt.ABONIDASH |
| 3204 | DHAPERHAT MONIKRISHNA SEN COLLEGE | RANGPUR | Non Govt. | 127940 | DHAPERHAT |
| 3206 | GOVT. BEGUM ROKEYA COLLEGE | RANGPUR | Govt. | 127485 | SHALBON |
| 3207 | RANGPUR GOVT. COLLEGE | RANGPUR | Govt. | 127484 | RANGPUR SADAR |
| 3208 | MAHIGANJ COLLEGE | RANGPUR | Non Govt. | 127482 | MAHIGONJ, SADOR |
| 3209 | ANONDALOK COLLEGE | RANGPUR | Non Govt. | 127491 | BURIRHAT |
| 3210 | GOVT. SHAH ABDUR ROUF COLLEGE, PEERGANJ | RANGPUR | Govt. | 127938 | PIRGANJ |
| 3211 | BADARGANJ GOVT. COLLEGE | RANGPUR | Govt. | 127233 | BADARGANJ |
| 3212 | KAUNIA COLLEGE | RANGPUR | Non Govt. | 127357 | KAUNIA, RANGPUR |
| 3213 | PEERGACHHA GOVT. COLLEGE | RANGPUR | Govt. | 127769 | PIRGACHHA |
| 3214 | TARAGANG WAQF ESTATE GOVT. COLLEGE | RANGPUR | Govt. | 127977 | TARAGONJ, RANGPUR |
| 3215 | MITHAPUKUR COLLEGE | RANGPUR | Non Govt. | 127664 | MITHAPUKUR |
| 3216 | HARAGACHH GOVT. COLLEGE | RANGPUR | Govt. | 127356 | HARAGACH, KAUNIA |
| 3217 | SATHIBARI COLLEGE | RANGPUR | Non Govt. | 127665 | SATHIBARI |
| 3218 | KAUNIA MAHILA COLLEGE | RANGPUR | Non Govt. | 127358 | SHAHABAJ |
| 3219 | PEERGANJ MAHILA COLLEGE | RANGPUR | Non Govt. | 127942 | PIRGANJ |
| 3220 | BADARGANJ MAHILA COLLEGE | RANGPUR | Non Govt. | 127234 | BADARGANJ |
| 3221 | RANGPUR MODEL COLLEGE | RANGPUR | Non Govt. | 127486 | CADET COLLEGE |
| 3222 | MAWLANA KERAMAT ALI COLLEGE | RANGPUR | Non Govt. | 127487 | PIRZABAD |
| 3223 | SHUKURERHAT COLLEGE | RANGPUR | Non Govt. | 127662 | SHUKURER HAT |
| 3224 | MIRZAPUR BASIRUDDIN COLLEGE | RANGPUR | Non Govt. | 127668 | DEULPARA, DEULPARA |
| 3225 | CHAWKESABPUR COLLEGE | RANGPUR | Non Govt. | 127488 | CHANDANPAT |
| 3226 | BHENDA BARI COLLEGE | RANGPUR | Non Govt. | 127941 | BHENDABARI |
| 3227 | PAIRABANDH GOVT. BEGUM ROKEYA SMRITI COLLEGE | RANGPUR | Govt. | 127666 | BEGUM ROKEYA SMRITI |
| 3228 | CHATRA COLLEGE | RANGPUR | Non Govt. | 127943 | PIRGANJ |
| 3229 | RADHAKRISHNAPUR COLLEGE | RANGPUR | Non Govt. | 127492 | RADHA KRISHNAPUR |
| 3230 | KUTUBPUR COLLEGE | RANGPUR | Non Govt. | 127235 | NATARAM, BADARGONJ |
| 3231 | PEERGACHHA MAHILA COLLEGE | RANGPUR | Non Govt. | 127770 | PEERGACHHA |
| 3232 | BALARHAT ADARSHA DEGREE COLLEGE | RANGPUR | Non Govt. | 127671 | MITHAPUKUR |
| 3233 | MIRBAGH DEGREE COLLEGE | RANGPUR | Non Govt. | 127359 | MIRBAGH |
| 3234 | DEVI CHOWDHURANI DEGREE COLLEGE | RANGPUR | Non Govt. | 127768 | CHOWDHURANI |
| 3235 | BAKSHIGANJ DEGREE COLLEGE | RANGPUR | Non Govt. | 127236 | AFTABABAD, BADARGANJ |
| 3236 | BAIRATI DEGREE COLLEGE | RANGPUR | Non Govt. | 127663 | BAIRATI HAT, MITHAPUKUR |
| 3237 | KHALASHPIR GOVT. BANGABANDHU COLLEGE | RANGPUR | Govt. | 127944 | LAXIMPUR TAKURDAS |
| 3238 | AKHIRAHAT DEGREE COLLEGE | RANGPUR | Non Govt. | 127667 | LALPUKUR, MITHAPUKUR |
| 3239 | DELTA COMPUTER SCIENCE COLLEGE | RANGPUR | Non Govt. | | R, K, ROAD, RANGPUR |
| 3240 | GANGACHARA WOMEN'S DEGREE COLLEGE | RANGPUR | Non Govt. | 127299 | GANGACHARA |
| 3241 | EKARCHALI COLLEGE | RANGPUR | Non Govt. | 127978 | EKARCHALI |
| 3242 | RANGPUR LAW COLLEGE | RANGPUR | Non Govt. | | |
| 3244 | GOVT. TEACHERS' TRAINING COLLEGE | RANGPUR | Govt. | | DHAP, LALKHUTHI |
| 3246 | RANGPUR B. P. ED. COLLEGE | RANGPUR | Non Govt. | | |
| 3247 | PAKURIA SHARIF COLLEGE | RANGPUR | Non Govt. | 132045 | PAKURIA SHARIF |
| 3248 | HARAGACH MODEL DEGREE COLLEGE | RANGPUR | Non Govt. | 127360 | HARAGACH POUROSHAVA |
| 3249 | RAHIM UDDIN BHARASA WOMEN'S COLLEGE | RANGPUR | Non Govt. | 127771 | PIRGACHHA, RANGPUR |
| 3250 | CHHARAN COLLEGE | RANGPUR | Non Govt. | 127670 | CHHARAN |
| 3251 | LALDIGHI PIRPAL COLLEGE | RANGPUR | Non Govt. | 127237 | MONDOL PARA |
| 3252 | NORTHBENGAL INSTITUTE OF DEVELOPMENT STUDIES (NIDS) | RANGPUR | Non Govt. | | NIDS Bhaban, R. K Road |
| 3253 | UPOMA INSTITUTE OF SCIENCE AND TECHNOLOGY | RANGPUR | Non Govt. | | SADAR, RANGPUR |
| 3254 | MADARGONJ DEGREE COLLEGE | RANGPUR | Non Govt. | 127939 | Badarganj |
| 3255 | RANGPUR INSTITUTE OF INFORMATION TECHNOLOGY | RANGPUR | Non Govt. | | SADAR, RANGPUR |
| 3501 | SHIBGANJ COLLEGE | THAKURGAON | Non Govt. | 129313 | SHIBGANJ, SADAR |
| 3502 | THAKURGAON GOVT. COLLEGE | THAKURGAON | Govt. | 129305 | THAKURGAON SADAR |
| 3503 | THAKURGAON GOVT. MAHILA COLLEGE | THAKURGAON | Govt. | 129308 | HAZIPARA |
| 3504 | RUHEA COLLEGE | THAKURGAON | Non Govt. | 129304 | RUHEA |
| 3506 | RANISANKAIL COLLEGE | THAKURGAON | Non Govt. | 129071 | RANISANKAIL |
| 3507 | GAREYA COLLEGE | THAKURGAON | Non Govt. | 129310 | GARHEA, GAREYA |
| 3508 | SALONDER COLLEGE | THAKURGAON | Non Govt. | 129307 | SALONDER, SALONDER |
| 3509 | PIRGANJ GOVT. COLLEGE | THAKURGAON | Govt. | 128965 | PIRGANJ, PIRGANJ |
| 3510 | BHULLI DEGREE COLLEGE | THAKURGAON | Non Govt. | 129311 | BHULLY, BHULLY |
| 3511 | ABDUR RASHID DEGREE COLLEGE | THAKURGAON | Non Govt. | 129312 | FARABARI, FARABARI |
| 3512 | D. N. COLLEGE | THAKURGAON | Non Govt. | 128967 | NARAYANPUR, PIRGANJ |
| 3513 | LAHIRI DEGREE COLLEGE | THAKURGAON | Non Govt. | 128769 | JAWNIA, LAHIRI |
| 3514 | RANISANKAIL WOMEN'S DEGREE COLLEGE | THAKURGAON | Non Govt. | 129070 | RANISANKAIL |
| 3515 | CHANDARIA DEGREE COLLEGE | THAKURGAON | Non Govt. | | KARNAI |
| 3516 | K. B. COLLEGE, HORIPUR | THAKURGAON | Non Govt. | 128889 | KATHALDANGI |
| 3517 | GAZIRHAT DEGREE COLLEGE | THAKURGAON | Non Govt. | 129073 | GAZIRHAT, BHORNIAHAT |
| 3519 | JABARHAT COLLEGE | THAKURGAON | Non Govt. | 128966 | KARNAI |
| 3520 | THAKURGAON LAW COLLEGE | THAKURGAON | Non Govt. | | Sadar, Thakurgoan |
| 3521 | SAMIRUDDIN SMRITY COLLEGE | THAKURGAON | Non Govt. | 128768 | BALIADANGI |
| 3522 | THAKURGAON ROAD COLLEGE | THAKURGAON | Non Govt. | 129309 | RAHIMANPUR, |
| 3523 | NEKMARAD BANGABANDHU GOVERNMENT COLLEGE | THAKURGAON | Govt. | 129072 | NEKMARAD, NEKMARAD |
| 3524 | MOSLEMUDDIN DEGREE MOHABIDDALOY | THAKURGAON | Govt. | 128848 | JIBONPUR |
| 3525 | PIRGONJ MAHILA COLLEGE | THAKURGAON | Non Govt. | 128968 | PIRGONJ MAHILA COLLEGE |
| 3526 | LOHAGARA COLLEGE | THAKURGAON | Non Govt. | 128970 | Pirganj, Thakurgaon |
| 3527 | ABUL HOSSAIN SARKER COLLEGE | THAKURGAON | Non Govt. | 129306 | Thakurgaon Sadar |
| 3528 | THAKURGAON SPECIAL TEACHERS TRAINING COLLEGE | THAKURGAON | Non Govt. | 2017 | THAKURGAON |

== Rajshahi Region ==
| College Code | College Name | District | College Type | EIIN | Address |
|---|---|---|---|---|---|
| 2701 | GOVT. AZIZUL HAQUE COLLEGE | BOGRA | Govt. | 119246 | KAMARGARI |
| 2702 | GABTALI COLLEGE | BOGRA | Govt. | 119546 | GABTALI |
| 2703 | GOVT. NAZIR AKHTER COLLEGE | BOGRA | Govt. | 119950 | GORFOTEPUR |
| 2704 | ADAM DIGHI RAHIMUDDIN DEGREE COLLEGE | BOGRA | Non Govt. | 119160 | ADAMDIGHI |
| 2705 | BOGRA GOVT. MUJIBUR RAHMAN MAHILA COLLEGE | BOGRA | Govt. | 119250 | FULBARI |
| 2707 | GOVT. SHAH SULTAN COLLEGE | BOGRA | Govt. | 119248 | BOGRA |
| 2708 | SHIBGANJ GOVT. MOZAFFAR HOSSAIN COLLEGE | BOGRA | Govt. | 119907 | SHIBGANJ |
| 2709 | MAHASTHAN MAHISAWAR COLLEGE | BOGRA | Non Govt. | 119908 | MAHASTHAN |
| 2710 | NAMUJA DEGREE COLLEGE | BOGRA | Non Govt. | 119253 | NAMUJA, BURIGONJ |
| 2711 | SHERPUR GOVERNMENT COLLEGE | BOGRA | Govt. | 119808 | SREERAMPUR PARA |
| 2712 | SYED AHMED COLLEGE, SUKHANPUKUR | BOGRA | Non Govt. | 119548 | SUKHANPUKUR |
| 2713 | SANTAHAR GOVT. COLLEGE | BOGRA | Govt. | 119157 | SANTAHAR |
| 2714 | NASRATPUR DEGREE COLLEGE | BOGRA | Non Govt. | 119159 | NASRATPUR |
| 2715 | KAHALU DEGREE COLLEGE | BOGRA | Govt. | 119612 | KAHALOO, KAHALOO |
| 2716 | DHUNAT DEGREE COLLEGE | BOGRA | Govt. | 119401 | DHUNAT, BOGRA |
| 2717 | SARIAKANDI COLLEGE | BOGRA | Non Govt. | 119713 | BALUAHATA |
| 2718 | CHANDAN BAISHA COLLEGE | BOGRA | Non Govt. | 119714 | CHANDANBAISHA |
| 2719 | DUP CHANCHIA MAHILA COLLEGE | BOGRA | Non Govt. | 119470 | DUPCHANCHIA |
| 2720 | BOGRA COLLEGE | BOGRA | Non Govt. | 119249 | NARULI DHAOWAPARA |
| 2721 | TOWN CLUB PUB. LIB. MAHILA COLLEGE | BOGRA | Non Govt. | 119807 | RAMCHANDRA PUR PARA |
| 2722 | MANSUR HOSSAIN COLLEGE, NANDIGRAM | BOGRA | Non Govt. | 119665 | NANDIGRAM, BOGRA |
| 2723 | JOYLAJUAN DEGREE COLLEGE | BOGRA | Non Govt. | 119806 | KALYANI |
| 2724 | GOSHAIBARI COLLEGE | BOGRA | Non Govt. | 119402 | GOSHAIBARI, DHUNAT |
| 2725 | SHAHID AHSANUL HAQUE COLLEGE | BOGRA | Non Govt. | 119161 | RATHBARI, SANTAHAR |
| 2726 | ADARSHA COLLEGE | BOGRA | Non Govt. | 119255 | PURAN BOGRA |
| 2727 | DARGAHAT COLLEGE | BOGRA | Non Govt. | 119614 | NARHATTA, KAHALOO |
| 2728 | MOKAMTALA MAHILA DEGREE COLLEGE | BOGRA | Non Govt. | 119909 | MOKAMTALA |
| 2729 | SHAHID M. MANSUR ALI DEGREE COLLEGE | BOGRA | Govt. | 119474 | ALTAFNAGAR |
| 2731 | NOONGOLA DEGREE COLLEGE | BOGRA | Non Govt. | 119254 | NOONGOLA, SADAR |
| 2732 | SHAHID ZIA DEGREE COLLEGE | BOGRA | Non Govt. | 119545 | BAGBARI, GABTALI |
| 2733 | AZIZUL HOQUE MEMORIAL DEGREE COLLEGE | BOGRA | Non Govt. | 119611 | MALONCHA, KAHALO |
| 2734 | KAHALU ADARSHA MOHILA DEGREE COLLEGE | BOGRA | Non Govt. | 119613 | LATIF BAG KAHALOO |
| 2735 | BALUAHAT DEGREE COLLEGE | BOGRA | Non Govt. | 119951 | BALUAHAT, SONATOLA |
| 2736 | DHUNAT MAHILA COLLEGE | BOGRA | Non Govt. | 119404 | DHUNAT |
| 2737 | G. M. C. DEGREE COLLEGE, MOTHURAPUR | BOGRA | Non Govt. | 119400 | MOTHURAPUR, PIRHATI |
| 2738 | DURGAHATTA DEGREE COLLEGE | BOGRA | Non Govt. | 119549 | DURGAHATTA, GABTALI |
| 2739 | CHHAIHATA DEGREE COLLEGE | BOGRA | Non Govt. | 119715 | CHHAIHATA |
| 2740 | HATKARI COLLEGE | BOGRA | Non Govt. | 119666 | HATKARAI, NANDIGRAM |
| 2741 | PIROB UNITED DEGREE COLLEGE, SHIHALI | BOGRA | Non Govt. | 119910 | SHIHALI, SHIBGANJ |
| 2742 | NANDIGRAM MOHILA DEGREE COLLEGE | BOGRA | Govt. | 119664 | Non Govt.ANDIGRAM POUROSAVA |
| 2743 | ZAHIDUR RAHMAN MOHILA COLLEGE | BOGRA | Non Govt. | 119247 | ARULIA |
| 2744 | BOGRA LAW COLLEGE | BOGRA | Non Govt. | | Non Govt.AWAB BARI ROAD |
| 2745 | RAHIMA-NAWSHER ALI DEGREE COLLEGE | BOGRA | Non Govt. | 119810 | SONKA, SHERPUR |
| 2748 | BOGRA B. ED. COLLEGE | BOGRA | Non Govt. | | SHERPUR ROAD, BANANI |
| 2749 | SHAHID MOSTAFIZUR RAHMAN B. P. ED. COLLEGE | BOGRA | Non Govt. | | Sherpur Road, Bogra Sadar |
| 2751 | BOGRA B. P. ED. COLLEGE | BOGRA | Non Govt. | | SHERPUR ROAD, BANANI |
| 2753 | BOGRA ART COLLEGE | BOGRA | Non Govt. | 133655 | Chalk Lokman |
| 2754 | BOGRA LIBRARY SCIENCE COLLEGE | BOGRA | Non Govt. | | CHALKLOKMAN, COLONY |
| 2755 | INSTITUTE OF NORTH BENGAL B. ED. COLLEGE | BOGRA | Non Govt. | | Uposhahar, Bogra |
| 2756 | DUP CHANCHIA J. K. COLLEGE | BOGRA | Non Govt. | 119471 | DUPCHANCHIA |
| 2757 | TASLIM UDDIN TARAFDER DEGREE COLLEGE | BOGRA | Non Govt. | 119550 | SONARAY |
| 2758 | SONAHATA COLLEGE | BOGRA | Non Govt. | 119403 | SONAHATA |
| 2759 | JALSUKA HABIBUR RAHMAN COLLEGE | BOGRA | Non Govt. | 119405 | PENCHIBARI, DHUNAT |
| 2760 | DUBLAGARI COLLEGE | BOGRA | Non Govt. | 119329 | SHAJAHANPUR |
| 2761 | TARANIRHAT COLLEGE | BOGRA | Non Govt. | 132059 | BALIADIGHI |
| 2762 | GOVT. KAMAR UDDIN ISLAMIA COLLEGE | BOGRA | Govt. | 119328 | DEMAJANI, SHAJAHANPUR |
| 2763 | NORTH INSTITUTE OF BUSINESS & SCIENCE (NIBS) | BOGRA | Non Govt. | | FULDIGHI, BANANI |
| 2764 | DR. ENAMUL HAQUE COLLEGE | BOGRA | Non Govt. | 119952 | Sonatola |
| 2765 | JANATA DEGREE COLLEGE | BOGRA | Non Govt. | 119257 | PANCHBARIAHAT |
| 2766 | CHOWDHURI ADARSHA WOMENS DEGREE COLLEGE | BOGRA | Non Govt. | 119912 | |
| 2767 | SONATOLA BEGUM FOJILATUNNECHHA MUJIB MOHILA COLLEGE | BOGRA | Non Govt. | 119949 | Sonatala, Bogra |
| 2768 | PROFESSIONAL COLLEGE | BOGRA | Non Govt. | | |
| 2769 | SARIAKANDI ABDUL MANNAN MOHILA DEGREE COLLEGE | BOGRA | Govt. | 119716 | SARIAKANDI |
| 2770 | GABTOLI MOHILA COLLEGE | BOGRA | Non Govt. | 119547 | Gabtali |
| 2771 | KOHINOOR BEGUM LIBRARY SCIENCE AND DIPLOMA COLLEGE | BOGRA | Non Govt. | | sadar, bogra |
| 2772 | POPULAR LIBRARY AND INFORMATION SCIENCE COLLEGE | BOGRA | Non Govt. | | BATTOLA |
| 2773 | BOGRA WOMEN'S COLLEGE | BOGRA | Non Govt. | 119256 | |
| 2774 | JAMUR ISLAMIA COLLEGE | BOGRA | Non Govt. | 119805 | |
| 2801 | JOYPURHAT GOVT. COLLEGE | JOYPURHAT | Govt. | 121897 | JOYPURHAT SADAR |
| 2802 | MAHIPUR HAJI MOHSIN GOVT. COLLEGE | JOYPURHAT | Govt. | 122068 | PANCHBIBI, JOYPURHAT |
| 2803 | JOYPURHAT GOVT. MOHILA COLLEGE | JOYPURHAT | Govt. | 121895 | JOYPURHAT SADOR |
| 2804 | GOVT. SAYEED ALTAFUNNESA COLLEGE | JOYPURHAT | Govt. | 121980 | KHETLAL |
| 2805 | AKKELPUR MUJIBAR RAHMAN GOVT. COLLEGE | JOYPURHAT | Govt. | 121801 | AKKELPUR, JOYPURHAT |
| 2806 | MONGOLBARI M. M. COLLEGE | JOYPURHAT | Non Govt. | 121892 | MONGOLBARI |
| 2807 | KALAI COLLEGE | JOYPURHAT | Non Govt. | 121943 | KALAI, JOYPURHAT |
| 2808 | AMDOI UNITED COLLEGE | JOYPURHAT | Non Govt. | 121894 | AMDAI |
| 2809 | KALAI GOVT. MOHILA COLLEGE | JOYPURHAT | Govt. | 121944 | KALAI |
| 2810 | PANCHBIBI DEGREE COLLEGE | JOYPURHAT | Non Govt. | 122070 | HORIHORPUR |
| 2811 | NURNAGAR UNITED DEGREE COLLEGE | JOYPURHAT | Non Govt. | 121803 | NURNAGAR, TILAKPUR |
| 2812 | JOYPURHAT LAW COLLEGE | JOYPURHAT | Non Govt. | 133763 | Pachbibbi Road |
| 2814 | JOYPURHAT B. ED. COLLEGE | JOYPURHAT | Non Govt. | | PuranaPoyal, Joypurhat |
| 2815 | JOYPURHAT MOHABIDYALAYA | JOYPURHAT | Non Govt. | 121896 | SADOR, JOYPURHAT |
| 2816 | AKKELPUR WOMEN'S COLLEGE | JOYPURHAT | Non Govt. | 121799 | AKKELPUR, JOYPURHAT |
| 2817 | JAMALGANJ COLLEGE | JOYPURHAT | Non Govt. | 121800 | JAMALGONJ |
| 2818 | JAIPURHAT WOMEN'S COLLEGE | JOYPURHAT | Non Govt. | 121898 | MUSLIM NOGAR |
| 2819 | TILAKPUR COLLEGE | JOYPURHAT | Non Govt. | 121802 | TILAKPUR |
| 2820 | SARAIL ADARSHA COLLEGE | JOYPURHAT | Non Govt. | 122071 | PANCHBIBI |
| 2821 | MODERN INSTITUTE OF LIBRARY & INFORMATION SCIENCE | JOYPURHAT | Non Govt. | | JOYPURHAT SADAR |
| 2401 | NAOGAON GOVT. COLLEGE | NAOGAON | Govt. | 123488 | BANGABARIA |
| 2402 | NAZIPUR GOVT. COLLEGE | NAOGAON | Govt. | 123645 | PATNITALA |
| 2403 | BANGABANDHU GOVT. COLLEGE | NAOGAON | Govt. | 123138 | BADALGACHHI |
| 2404 | GOVT. BASIR UDDIN MEMORIAL CO-OPERATIVE WOMEN'S COLLEGE | NAOGAON | Govt. | 123487 | NAOGAON SADAR |
| 2405 | MOLLAH AZAD MEMORIAL GOVERNMENT COLLEGE | NAOGAON | Govt. | 123085 | AHSANGANJ, ATRAI |
| 2406 | SAPAHAR GOVT. COLLEGE | NAOGAON | Govt. | 123825 | SAPAHAR |
| 2407 | MANDA MOMEN SAHANA GOVT. COLLEGE | NAOGAON | Govt. | 123317 | MANDA, NAOGAON |
| 2408 | NEAMATPUR GOVT. COLLEGE | NAOGAON | Govt. | 123564 | NIAMATPUR |
| 2409 | JAHANGIRPUR COLLEGE | NAOGAON | Govt. | 123407 | MOHADEVPUR |
| 2410 | PORSHA DEGREE COLLEGE | NAOGAON | Govt. | 123701 | PORSHA |
| 2411 | GOVT. DHAMOIRHAT M. M. COLLEGE | NAOGAON | Govt. | 123195 | |
| 2412 | GANGURIA DEGREE COLLEGE | NAOGAON | Non Govt. | 123702 | GANGURIA |
| 2413 | UTTARA COLLEGE | NAOGAON | Non Govt. | 123316 | KALIGRAM, MANDA |
| 2414 | CHOWDHURY CHAND MOHAMMAD MAHILA COLLEGE | NAOGAON | Non Govt. | 123827 | SAPAHAR |
| 2415 | CHAKULI COLLEGE | NAOGAON | Non Govt. | 123318 | CHAKULI, MANDA |
| 2416 | RANINAGHAR MAHILA COLLEGE | NAOGAON | Non Govt. | 123742 | RANINAGAR |
| 2417 | BANDAIKHARA DEGREE COLLEGE | NAOGAON | Non Govt. | 123084 | BANDAIKHARA, ATRAI |
| 2418 | BALIHAR DEGREE COLLEGE | NAOGAON | Non Govt. | 123486 | BALIHAR |
| 2419 | CHANDASH COLLEGE | NAOGAON | Non Govt. | 123409 | |
| 2420 | FOYEZ UDDIN MEMORIAL COLLEGE | NAOGAON | Non Govt. | 123490 | DURGAPUR |
| 2421 | CHOWRAT SHIBPUR BARANDRA COLLEGE | NAOGAON | Non Govt. | 123647 | CHOWRAT SHIBPUR |
| 2422 | NAOGAON LAW COLLEGE | NAOGAON | Non Govt. | | Sadar Natore |
| 2423 | BALATOIR SIDDIQUE HOSSAIN COLLEGE | NAOGAON | Non Govt. | 123565 | BALATOIR, BALATOIR |
| 2424 | DHAMOIRHAT WOMEN'S COLLEGE | NAOGAON | Non Govt. | 123196 | CHAKJADU |
| 2425 | BADALGACHI MOHILA COLLEGE | NAOGAON | Non Govt. | 123140 | BADALGACHHI |
| 2426 | DASHPARA COLLEGE | NAOGAON | Non Govt. | 123321 | JOKAHAT, MANDA |
| 2427 | SHER-E-BANGLA MAHAVIDYALAYA | NoAOGAON | Govt. | 123741 | RANINAGAR |
| 2428 | NAOGAON ASTAN MOLLAH COLLEGE | NAOGAON | Non Govt. | 123489 | KDMORE, NAOGAON |
| 2429 | ATRAI WOMEN'S COLLEGE | NAOGAON | Non Govt. | 123086 | ATRAI, NAOGAON |
| 2430 | GOBAR CHAPAHAT COLLEGE | NAOGAON | Non Govt. | 123137 | JABARIPURHAT |
| 2431 | RAIGOAN COLLEGE | NAOGAON | Non Govt. | 123408 | RAIGAON |
| 2432 | KOLA ADORSHO COLLEGE | Non Govt.AOGAON | Non Govt. | 123139 | KOLA HAT |
| 2433 | NAZIPUR MOHILA COLLEGE | NAOGAON | Non Govt. | 123646 | PALSHA, Patnitola |
| 2434 | TILNA COLLEGE | NAOGAON | Non Govt. | 123826 | TILNA |
| 2435 | KRISHNAPUR COLLEGE | NAOGAON | Non Govt. | 123648 | KRISHNAPUR |
| 2436 | DIGHIRHAT COLLEGE | NAOGAON | Non Govt. | 123824 | Sapahar, Naogaon |
| 2437 | PANIAL ADARSHA COLLEGE | NAOGAON | Non Govt. | 123319 | PANIAL |
| 2301 | N. S. GOVT. COLLEGE | NATORE | Govt. | 124235 | N.S GOVT. COLLEGE |
| 2302 | KHUBJIPUR MOZAMMEL HAQUE COLLEGE | NATORE | Non Govt. | 124029 | |
| 2303 | RANI BHAWANI GOVT. MAHILA COLLEGE | NATORE | Govt. | 124237 | NATORE SADAR |
| 2304 | DIGHAPATIA M. K. COLLEGE | NATORE | Non Govt. | 124236 | DIGHAPATIA |
| 2305 | GOL-E-AFROZ GOVT. COLLEGE | NATORE | Govt. | 124312 | SINGRA, NATORE |
| 2306 | BONPARA COLLEGE | NATORE | Non Govt. | 123976 | BONPARA, HAROA |
| 2307 | BAGATIPARA GOVT. COLLEGE | NATORE | Govt. | 123888 | BAGATIPARA, NATORE |
| 2308 | BILCHALAN SHAHID SHAMSUZZOHA GOVT. COLLEGE | NATORE | Govt. | 124028 | GURUDASPUR |
| 2309 | ABDULPUR GOVT. COLLEGE | NATORE | Govt. | 124115 | NATORE |
| 2310 | GOPALPUR COLLEGE | NATORE | Non Govt. | 124114 | GOPALPUR |
| 2311 | BARAIGRAM GOVERNMENT COLLEGE | NATORE | Govt. | 123970 | BARAIGRAM, NATORE |
| 2312 | SHAHID NAZMUL HAQUE DEGREE COLLEGE | NATORE | Govt. | 124239 | NALDANGA |
| 2313 | KALAM COLLEGE | NATORE | Non Govt. | 124313 | MIRZAPUR |
| 2314 | MOHORKOYA COLLEGE | NATORE | Non Govt. | 124113 | MOHORKAYA, BILMARIA |
| 2315 | TAMALTALA KRISHI & KARIGARI COLLEGE | NATORE | Non Govt. | 123886 | TAMALTALA, BAGATIPARA. |
| 2316 | JAMNAGAR COLLEGE | NATORE | Non Govt. | 123889 | JAMNAGAR, JAMNAGAR |
| 2317 | BANSHBARIA DEGREE COLLEGE | NATORE | Non Govt. | 123890 | BANSHBARIA |
| 2318 | GOPALPUR WOMEN'S DEGREE COLLEGE | NATORE | Non Govt. | 124117 | GOPALPUR |
| 2319 | ROHMOT IQBAL DEGREE COLLEGE | NATORE | Non Govt. | 124315 | BAMIHA |
| 2320 | MOUKHARA ISLAMIA WOMEN'S DEGREE COLLEGE | NATORE | Non Govt. | 123974 | MOUKHARA |
| 2321 | RAZAPUR DEGREE COLLEGE | NATORE | Non Govt. | 123978 | RAJAPUR HAT |
| 2322 | SHEIKH FAZILATUNNESA MUZIB GOVT. WOMEN'S DEGREE COLLEGE | NATORE | Govt. | 123971 | BOANPARA, HAROYA |
| 2323 | BAGATIPARA MOHILA DEGREE COLLEGE | NATORE | Non Govt. | 123885 | BAGATIPARA |
| 2324 | DATTAPARA MODEL DEGREE COLLEGE | NATORE | Non Govt. | 124238 | DATTAPARA, DHARAIL |
| 2325 | BILL HALTI TRIMOHONI DEGREE COLLEGE | NATORE | Non Govt. | 124316 | NAGRMAJGRAM |
| 2326 | NAZIRPUR DEGREE COLLEGE | NATORE | Non Govt. | 124031 | Non Govt.AZIRPUR, NAZIRPUR HAT |
| 2327 | MADHNAGAR DEGREE COLLEGE | NATORE | Non Govt. | 124240 | MADHNAGAR, NALDANGA |
| 2328 | ROSEY MOZAMMEL WOMEN'S COLLEGE | NATORE | Non Govt. | 124030 | GURUDASPUR |
| 2329 | AHAMMEDPUR DEGREE COLLEGE | NATORE | Non Govt. | 123972 | AHAMMEDPUR |
| 2330 | ZONAIL DEGREE COLLEGE | NATORE | Non Govt. | 123979 | ZONAIL, BARAIGRAM |
| 2331 | NATORE CITY COLLEGE | NATORE | Non Govt. | 124234 | NATORE |
| 2332 | SAILKONA COLLEGE | NATORE | Non Govt. | 123883 | BAGATIPARA, NATORE |
| 2333 | NATORE TEACHERS' TRAINING COLLEGE | NATORE | Non Govt. | | Natore Sadar |
| 2334 | NATORE MOHILA COLLEGE | NATORE | Non Govt. | 132044 | BONBELGHORIA |
| 2335 | SINGRA CHALANBIL WOMEN'S DEGREE COLLEGE | NATORE | Non Govt. | 124310 | SINGRA, NATORE |
| 2336 | KHALISHA DANGA DEGREE COLLEGE | NATORE | Non Govt. | 123977 | DHANAIDAH |
| 2337 | KAFURIA DEGREE COLLEGE | NATORE | Non Govt. | 124241 | KAFURIA |
| 2338 | LALPUR COLLEGE | NATORE | Non Govt. | 124116 | JATDOYBOKY |
| 2339 | AZAM ALI COLLEGE | NATORE | Non Govt. | 123975 | BARAIGRAM |
| 2340 | QADIRABAD CANTONMENT SAPPER COLLEGE | NATORE | Non Govt. | 123887 | DAYARAMPUR |
| 2341 | RAHIM UDDIN AHMED MEMORIAL COLLEGE | NATORE | Non Govt. | 124314 | SINGRA |
| 2342 | BANGABANDHU SHAIKH MUJIB COLLEGE | NATORE | Non Govt. | 124244 | CHATNI |
| 2343 | CHAMARI DEGREE COLLEGE | NATORE | Non Govt. | 124311 | CHAMARI |
| 2344 | JAHANARA & LATIFAR RAHMAN SPECIAL EDUCATION TEACHER'S TRAINING COLLEGE | NATORE | Non Govt. | | Mohorkaya, Bilmaria |
| 2601 | NAWABGANJ GOVT. COLLEGE | NAWABGONJ | Govt. | 124593 | CHPAINAWABGANJ |
| 2602 | SHAH NEAMATULLAH COLLEGE | NAWABGONJ | Non Govt. | 124592 | CHAPAI NAWABGONJ |
| 2603 | CHAPAI NAWABGANJ MAHILA COLLEGE | NAWABGONJ | Govt. | 124594 | KATHAL BAGICHA |
| 2604 | NACHOLE GOVT. COLLEGE | NAWABGONJ | Govt. | 124485 | NACHOLE |
| 2605 | ADINA FAZLUL HAQUE GOVT. COLLEGE | NAWABGONJ | Govt. | 124743 | SHIBGONJ |
| 2606 | BINODPUR COLLEGE | NAWABGONJ | Non Govt. | 124746 | BINODPUR, SHIBGONJ |
| 2607 | SHIBGANJ MAHILA COLLEGE | NAWABGONJ | Non Govt. | 124742 | COLLEGE ROAD, SHIBGANJ |
| 2608 | KANSAT SOLEMAN COLLEGE | NAWABGONJ | Non Govt. | 124744 | KANSAT |
| 2609 | SHIBGANJ COLLEGE | NAWABGONJ | Non Govt. | 124741 | SHIBGONJ |
| 2610 | KRISHNA GOBINDAPUR COLLEGE | NAWABGONJ | Non Govt. | 124600 | RAMCHANDRAPUR HAT |
| 2611 | ALLAHBAKSH MEMORIAL COLLEGE | NAWABGONJ | Non Govt. | 124737 | SATRAJITPUR |
| 2612 | ROHANPUR YUSUF ALI GOVT. COLLEGE | NAWABGONJ | Govt. | 124418 | ROHANPUR |
| 2613 | MAHIPUR COLLEGE | NAWABGONJ | Non Govt. | 124597 | MAHIPUR, MAHIPUR |
| 2614 | GOMOSTAPUR SOLEMAN MIAH COLLEGE | NAWABGONJ | Non Govt. | 124420 | GOMASTAPUR |
| 2615 | BHOLAHAT MOHBULLAH DEGREE COLLEGE | NAWABGONJ | Non Govt. | 124347 | SANNASITALA |
| 2616 | SHAHBAJPUR SONAMASHJID DEGREE COLLEGE | NAWABGONJ | Non Govt. | 124740 | SHAHBAJPUR |
| 2617 | BALUGRAM ADORSHA COLLEGE | NAWABGONJ | Non Govt. | 124598 | BALUGRAM |
| 2618 | BIRSHERSTHA CAPTAIN MOHIUDDIN JAHANGIR DEGREE COLLEGE | NAWABGONJ | Non Govt. | 124749 | SONAMOSJID |
| 2619 | BHOLAHAT GOVT. MOHILA COLLEGE | NAWABGONJ | Govt. | 124348 | BHOLAHAT |
| 2620 | RADHAKANTAPUR COLLEGE | NAWABGONJ | Non Govt. | 124747 | SHIBGANJ |
| 2621 | NACHOLE WOMEN'S COLLEGE | NAWABGONJ | Non Govt. | 124486 | NACHOLE |
| 2622 | NAMOSONKARBATI COLLEGE | NAWABGONJ | Non Govt. | 124595 | NAMOSONKARBATI |
| 2624 | ROHANPUR MOHILA COLLEGE | NAWABGONJ | Non Govt. | 124417 | ROHANPUR |
| 2625 | SHYAMPUR HAZI MOMTAJ MIAH DEGREE COLLEGE | NAWABGONJ | Non Govt. | 124739 | SHYAMPUR |
| 2626 | NAWABGANJ CITY COLLEGE | NAWABGONJ | Non Govt. | 124596 | PURATON |
| 2627 | ALHAJ ABDUS SAMAD COLLEGE | NAWABGONJ | Non Govt. | 124602 | SUNDORPUR |
| 2628 | RANIHATI COLLEGE | NAWABGONJ | Non Govt. | 124748 | RANIHATI, SHIBGANJ |
| 2629 | SHAHID SRETI COLLEGE | NAWABGONJ | Non Govt. | 124488 | |
| 2630 | JAMBARIA COLLEGE | NAWABGONJ | Non Govt. | 124349 | Bholahat, |
| 2631 | RADHANAGAR BARENDRA COLLEGE | NAWABGONJ | Non Govt. | 124421 | Gomastapur |
| 2632 | ROHANPUR P.M. IDEAL COLLEGE | NAWABGONJ | Non Govt. | 124419 | ROHANPUR |
| 2101 | GOVT. EDWARD COLLEGE | PABNA | Govt. | 125663 | PABNA |
| 2102 | SHAHID BULBUL GOVT. COLLEGE | PABNA | Govt. | 125664 | ATAIKULA ROAD |
| 2103 | BASHER BADA COLLEGE | PABNA | Non Govt. | 125556 | BANSHER BADA, ISHWARDI |
| 2104 | PABNA COLLEGE (DAY/NIGHT) | PABNA | Non Govt. | 332104 | SHA ALAM ROAD |
| 2105 | PABNA GOVT. MAHILA COLLEGE | PABNA | Govt. | 125665 | DILALPUR |
| 2106 | GOVT. HAJI JAMALUDDIN COLLEGE | PABNA | Govt. | 125371 | CHAWBARIA, BHANGOORA |
| 2107 | GOVT. MOHAMMAD YASIN COLLEGE | PABNA | Govt. | 125489 | BANWARINAGAR |
| 2108 | BERA GOVERNMENT COLLEGE | PABNA | Govt. | 125329 | BERA |
| 2109 | SANTHIA GOVT. COLLEGE | PABNA | Govt. | 125742 | BOILMARI |
| 2110 | SHAHEED NURUL HOSSAIN COLLEGE | PABNA | Non Govt. | 125744 | KASHINATHPUR |
| 2111 | MADHPUR AMENA KHATUN COLLEGE | PABNA | Non Govt. | 125745 | ATAIKULA |
| 2112 | GOVERNMENT ISWARDI COLLEGE | PABNA | Govt. | 125552 | ISHWARDI |
| 2113 | PAKSHI RAILWAY COLLEGE | PABNA | Non Govt. | 125555 | PAKSEY, ISHWARDI |
| 2114 | CHATMOHAR GOVT. COLLEGE | PABNA | Govt. | 125454 | CHATMOHAR |
| 2115 | ISWARDI MAHILA DEGREE COLLEGE | PABNA | Non Govt. | 125553 | ISHWARDI |
| 2116 | DASHURIA COLLEGE | PABNA | Non Govt. | 125554 | DASHURIA |
| 2117 | MIRZAPUR COLLEGE | PABNA | Non Govt. | 125451 | ASTOMONISHA |
| 2118 | MANJUR KADER MAHILA COLLEGE | PABNA | Non Govt. | 125330 | BERA, PABNA |
| 2119 | DEBOTTAR COLLEGE | PABNA | Non Govt. | 125298 | DEBOTTAR |
| 2120 | HAJI JASHIMUDDIN COLLEGE | PABNA | Non Govt. | 125656 | DUBLIA, PABNA |
| 2121 | CHAIKOLA DEGREE COLLEGE | PABNA | Non Govt. | 125452 | CHAIKOLA |
| 2122 | SAMSUL HUDA DEGREE COLLEGE | PABNA | Non Govt. | 125654 | TEBUNIA, MALIGACHA |
| 2123 | DR. ZAHURUL KAMAL DEGREE COLLEGE | PABNA | Govt. | 125790 | DULAI |
| 2124 | PROFESSOR BOYEN UDDIN DEGREE COLLEGE | PABNA | Non Govt. | 125453 | POST: PANCHURIA |
| 2125 | KHIDIRPUR DEGREE COLLEGE | PABNA | Non Govt. | 125303 | KHIDIRPUR BAZAR |
| 2126 | SHAHID M. MANSUR ALI COLLEGE | PABNA | Non Govt. | 125659 | SHALGARIA, PABNA |
| 2127 | PARKHIDIR PUR DEGREE COLLEGE | PABNA | Non Govt. | 125302 | PARKHIDIRPUR |
| 2128 | CHATMOHAR WOMEN'S DEGREE COLLEGE | PABNA | Non Govt. | 125455 | CHATMOHAR NBAZAR |
| 2129 | PABNA ISLAMIA (DEGREE) COLLEGE | PABNA | Non Govt. | 125660 | LASKAR PUR |
| 2130 | SANTHIA MOHILA DEGREE COLLEGE | PABNA | Non Govt. | 125743 | SANTHIA, PABNA |
| 2131 | SHAHID AMINUDDIN LAW COLLEGE | PABNA | Non Govt. | 133587 | Rupkhata Road |
| 2132 | PABNA B. ED. COLLEGE | PABNA | Non Govt. | | Bera |
| 2134 | GOVT. TEACHERS' TRAINING COLLEGE | PABNA | Govt. | | Sdaar, Pabna |
| 2135 | PAKSHI COLLEGE OF PHYSICAL EDUCATION, PAKSHI | PABNA | Non Govt. | | PAKSHI, ISHURDI |
| 2136 | SELIM REZA HABIB DEGREE COLLEGE, MALIFA | PABNA | Non Govt. | 125792 | MALIFA, SUJANAGAR |
| 2138 | DULAURI DEGREE COLLEGE | PABNA | Non Govt. | 125698 | DHULAURI |
| 2139 | CITY COLLEGE | PABNA | Non Govt. | 125655 | GOPALPUR |
| 2140 | EUNUS ALI DEGREE COLLEGE | PABNA | Non Govt. | 125491 | DHANUAGHATA |
| 2141 | ATGHORIA GOVT. COLLEGE | PABNA | Govt. | 125300 | CHANDV |
| 2142 | DENGERGRAM DEGREE COLLEGE | PABNA | Non Govt. | 125301 | EKDANTA |
| 2143 | MASHUNDIA BHAWANIPUR K. J. B. DEGREE COLLEGE | PABNA | Non Govt. | 125331 | MASHUNDIA |
| 2144 | NIZAMUDDIN ASGAR ALI COLLEGE | PABNA | Non Govt. | 125789 | SUJANAGAR |
| 2145 | JORGACHA COLLEGE | PABNA | Non Govt. | 125746 | JORGACHA |
| 2146 | KASHINATHPUR WOMENS COLLEGE | PABNA | Non Govt. | 125332 | HORIDEBPUR, KASHINATHPUR |
| 2147 | NAKALIA MONJUR KADER COLLEGE | PABNA | Non Govt. | 125328 | NAKALIA, BERA |
| 2148 | SUJANAGAR WOMENS COLLEGE | PABNA | Non Govt. | 125788 | POST. SUJANAGAR |
| 2149 | MOHILA COLLEGE BHANGOORA | PABNA | Non Govt. | | bhangoor, bhangoora |
| 2150 | SATBARIA DEGREE COLLEGE | PABNA | Non Govt. | 125791 | SATBARIA, Sujanagar |
| 2151 | SALIMPUR DEGREE COLLEGE | PABNA | Non Govt. | 125557 | MANIK NAGOR |
| 2501 | RAJSHAHI COLLEGE | RAJSHAHI | Govt. | 126490 | Boalia |
| 2502 | RAJSHAHI GOVT. CITY COLLEGE | RAJSHAHI | Govt. | 126489 | RAJAHATA, BOALIA |
| 2503 | SHAH MAKHDUM COLLEGE | RAJSHAHI | Non Govt. | 126481 | GHORAMARA |
| 2504 | ADARSHA COLLEGE, SHYAMPOR | RAJSHAHI | Non Govt. | 126930 | SHYAMPOR |
| 2505 | RAJSHAHI COURT COLLEGE | RAJSHAHI | Non Govt. | 127039 | Rajshai Court, Rajpara |
| 2506 | RAJSHAHI NEW GOVT. DEGREE COLLEGE | RAJSHAHI | Govt. | 127038 | KAZIHATA |
| 2507 | RAJSHAHI GOVT. MAHILA COLLEGE | RAJSHAHI | Govt. | 126487 | KADIRGONG, BOALIA |
| 2508 | MADARBAKSH HOME ECONOMICS COLLEGE | RAJSHAHI | Non Govt. | 127040 | PADMA R/A |
| 2509 | BHABANIGANJ GOVERNMENT COLLEGE | RAJSHAHI | Govt. | 126422 | BAGMARA |
| 2510 | TAHERPUR COLLEGE | RAJSHAHI | Non Govt. | 126424 | TAHERPUR, BAGMARA |
| 2511 | DURGAPUR COLLEGE | RAJSHAHI | Non Govt. | 126659 | SINGA, DURGAPUR |
| 2512 | DAOKANDI GOVT. COLLEGE | RAJSHAHI | Govt. | 126660 | DAOKANDI, DURGAPUR |
| 2513 | TANOR ABDUL KARIM SARKAR COLLEGE | RAJSHAHI | Govt. | 127146 | TANORE |
| 2514 | LALIT MOHAN COLLEGE | RAJSHAHI | Non Govt. | 127144 | TALANDA, TANORE |
| 2515 | GODAGARI GOVT. COLLEGE | RAJSHAHI | Govt. | 126762 | GODAGARI, RAHSHAHI |
| 2516 | MOHANPUR GOVT. COLLEGE | RAJSHAHI | Govt. | 126841 | MOHANPUR, Mohanpur |
| 2517 | BANESWAR GOVT. COLLEGE | RAJSHAHI | Govt. | 127013 | BANESWAR COLLEGE |
| 2518 | SHAHDOWLA GOVERNMENT COLLEGE | RAJSHAHI | Govt. | 126255 | BAGHA, RAJSHAHI |
| 2519 | PUTHIA LASKARPUR COLLEGE | RAJSHAHI | Non Govt. | 127014 | PUTHIA |
| 2520 | ARANI COLLEGE | RAJSHAHI | Non Govt. | 126256 | ARANI, BAGHA |
| 2521 | SARDAH GOVT. COLLEGE | RAJSHAHI | Govt. | 126582 | SARDAH, CHARGHAT |
| 2522 | PRAMTALI COLLEGE | RAJSHAHI | Non Govt. | 126761 | PREMTALI, GODAGARI |
| 2523 | NOWHATA GOVERNMENT COLLEGE | RAJSHAHI | Govt. | 126933 | NOWHATA, NOWHATA |
| 2524 | CHARGHAT M. A. HADI COLLEGE | RAJSHAHI | Non Govt. | 126583 | CHARGHAT |
| 2525 | TANOR MAHILA COLLEGE | RAJSHAHI | Non Govt. | 127136 | CHAPRA, TALANDA |
| 2526 | MACHMAIL COLLEGE | RAJSHAHI | Non Govt. | 126421 | |
| 2527 | PANIA NARDASH COLLEGE | RAJSHAHI | Non Govt. | 126420 | NORDASH |
| 2528 | GODAGARI MAHILA COLLEGE | RAJSHAHI | Non Govt. | 126759 | MOHISALBARI |
| 2529 | DHOKRAKUL COLLEGE | RAJSHAHI | Non Govt. | 127018 | DHOKRAKUL, PUTHIA |
| 2530 | PUTHIA MOHILA COLLEGE | RAJSHAHI | Non Govt. | 127016 | PUTHIA |
| 2531 | IDEAL COLLEGE | RAJSHAHI | Non Govt. | 127010 | JAMIRA |
| 2532 | PUTHIA ISLAMIA MAHILA COLLEGE | RAJSHAHI | Non Govt. | 127015 | PUTHIA |
| 2533 | HATKANPARA JOBEDA COLLEGE | RAJSHAHI | Non Govt. | 126661 | HAT KAN PARA |
| 2534 | SHOLUA COLLEGE | RAJSHAHI | Non Govt. | 126585 | SHOLUA, CHARGHAT |
| 2535 | KESHARHAT COLLEGE | RAJSHAHI | Non Govt. | 126840 | POST. KESHORHAT |
| 2536 | METROPOLITAN COLLEGE | RAJSHAHI | Non Govt. | 126486 | PABA NATUN PARA |
| 2537 | ISLAMIA COLLEGE | RAJSHAHI | Non Govt. | 126482 | BINODPUR BAZAR |
| 2538 | BANGABANDHU COLLEGE, BOALIA | RAJSHAHI | Non Govt. | 126485 | Boalia |
| 2539 | INSTITUTE OF BUSINESS ADMINSTRATION (IBA) | RAJSHAHI | Non Govt. | | KAZLA |
| 2540 | HATGANGOPARA DEGREE COLLEGE | RAJSHAHI | Non Govt. | 126426 | BAGMARA |
| 2541 | SREEPUR RAMNAGAR DEGREE COLLEGE | RAJSHAHI | Non Govt. | 126430 | SAIPARA, BAGMARA |
| 2542 | MOHONGONJ DEGREE COLLEGE | RAJSHAHI | Non Govt. | 126427 | ALIABAD |
| 2543 | MATIKATA ADARSHA DEGREE COLLEGE | RAJSHAHI | Non Govt. | 126760 | MATIKATA |
| 2544 | KALIGONJ HAT DEGREE COLLEGE | RAJSHAHI | Non Govt. | 127138 | KALIGONJ HAT |
| 2545 | NAOHATA WOMEN'S COLLEGE | RAJSHAHI | Non Govt. | 126932 | NAOHATA |
| 2546 | HAT RAMCHANDRAPUR DEGREE COLLEGE | RAJSHAHI | Non Govt. | 126935 | RAMCHANDRAPUR |
| 2547 | ATRAI AGRANI DEGREE COLLEGE | RAJSHAHI | Non Govt. | 126843 | ATRAI, GOCHA |
| 2548 | POCHAMARIA DEGREE COLLEGE | RAJSHAHI | Non Govt. | 127017 | POCHAMARIA |
| 2549 | BAKTIARPUR DEGREE COLLEGE | RAJSHAHI | Non Govt. | 126662 | BAKTIARPUR |
| 2550 | NANDANGACHHI DEGREE COLLEGE | RAJSHAHI | Non Govt. | 126584 | NANDANGACHHI |
| 2551 | SARANJAI DEGREE COLLEGE | RAJSHAHI | Non Govt. | 127141 | SARANJAI |
| 2552 | DHOPAGHATA DEGREE COLLEGE | RAJSHAHI | Non Govt. | 126850 | DHOPAGHATA |
| 2553 | BHBANIGONJ WOMEN'S DEGREE COLLEGE | RAJSHAHI | Non Govt. | 126425 | BHABANIGANJ |
| 2554 | MOZAHAR HOSSAIN MOHILA DEGREE COLLEGE | RAJSHAHI | Non Govt. | 126257 | MILIK BAGHA |
| 2555 | DAKRA DEGREE COLLEGE | RAJSHAHI | Non Govt. | 126579 | DAKRA, CHARGHAT |
| 2556 | KAMELA HAQUE DEGREE COLLEGE | RAJSHAHI | Non Govt. | 126772 | BINODPUR BAZAR |
| 2557 | MOHANPUR GIRL'S DEGREE COLLEGE | RAJSHAHI | Non Govt. | 126847 | |
| 2559 | DURGAPUR MOHILA COLLEGE | RAJSHAHI | Non Govt. | 126664 | DURGAPUR |
| 2560 | MOHABBATPUR KHANPUR COLLEGE | RAJSHAHI | Non Govt. | 126842 | KHANPUR, DHURAIL |
| 2561 | SHYAMPUR HAT DEGREE COLLEGE | RAJSHAHI | Non Govt. | 126845 | GOCHA, MOHANPUR |
| 2562 | Govt.OUSUFPUR COLLEGE | RAJSHAHI | Non Govt. | 126580 | Govt.OUSUFPUR |
| 2563 | RAJSHAHI LAW COLLEGE | RAJSHAHI | Non Govt. | | boalia, rajshahi |
| 2565 | PUNGU SHISU NIKATON SHAMONNITO ABOYTONIK COLLEGE | RAJSHAHI | Non Govt. | 122720 | SADONPUR, PUTHIA |
| 2567 | HAJI JAMIR UDDIN SHAFINA WOMEN'S COLLEGE | RAJSHAHI | Non Govt. | 127037 | LUXMIPUR VATAPARA |
| 2568 | AL-HAJ ERSHAD ALI WOMEN'S COLLEGE | RAJSHAHI | Non Govt. | 126261 | ARANI |
| 2569 | ADARSHA SHIKKHAK PROSHIKHAN COLLEGE | RAJSHAHI | Non Govt. | 133309 | HATEMKHAN |
| 2570 | GOVT. TEACHERS' TRAINING COLLEGE | RAJSHAHI | Govt. | 133604 | Sadar |
| 2572 | UTTARBANGA TEACHERS' TRAINING COLLEGE | RAJSHAHI | Non Govt. | | kazla, rajshahi |
| 2573 | CHARGHAT WOMENS DEGREE COLLEGE | RAJSHAHI | Non Govt. | 126587 | CHARGHAT |
| 2575 | GOVT. PHYSICAL EDUCATION COLLEGE | RAJSHAHI | Govt. | | VOBINYGANG BAGMARA |
| 2577 | SHAHID ZIAUR RAHMAN PHYSICAL EDUCATION COLLEGE | RAJSHAHI | Non Govt. | | Mothihar, Shampur |
| 2578 | INSTITUTE FOR LIBRARY AND INFORMATION STUDIES (ILIS) | RAJSHAHI | Non Govt. | | TALAIMARI |
| 2580 | RAJSHAHI ART COLLEGE | RAJSHAHI | Non Govt. | 133596 | Shiroil Rajshahi |
| 2581 | DHOPAPARA MEMOREAL COLLEGE | RAJSHAHI | Non Govt. | 127021 | DHOPAPARA, PUTHIA |
| 2582 | PARAGON INSTITUTE OF BUSINESS & ARTS (PIBA) | RAJSHAHI | Non Govt. | | Ramchandrapur |
| 2583 | RAJABARI DEGREE MAHABIDDALAYA | RAJSHAHI | Non Govt. | 126763 | BOJAY NAGAR |
| 2584 | SHAHID A.H.M. KAMARUZZAMAN DEGREE COLLEGE | RAJSHAHI | Govt. | 126484 | UPASHAHAR |
| 2585 | MONDUMALA WOMEN'S DEGREE COLLEGE | RAJSHAHI | Non Govt. | 127143 | SADIPUR |
| 2586 | SALEHA-EMARAT DEGREE COLLEGE | RAJSHAHI | Non Govt. | 126419 | SHANKOA, KAMARBARI |
| 2587 | KAKONHAT COLLEGE | RAJSHAHI | Non Govt. | 126757 | KAKONHAT, GODAGARI |
| 2588 | FAZAR ALI MOLLA DEGREE COLLEGE | RAJSHAHI | Non Govt. | 127140 | MUNDUMALA |
| 2589 | ALHAZ SUJAUDDAWLA COLLEGE | RAJSHAHI | Non Govt. | 126493 | TAROKHADIA |
| 2590 | BAGMARA COLLEGE | RAJSHAHI | Non Govt. | 126423 | BAGMARA |
| 2591 | NASIRGONJ DEGREE COLLEGE | RAJSHAHI | Non Govt. | 126431 | NASIRGONJ, BAGMARA |
| 2592 | SAYEDPUR MOCHMOIL WOMENS DEGREE COLLEGE | RAJSHAHI | Non Govt. | 126433 | SAYEDPUR, MOCHMOIL |
| 2593 | KRISHNAPUR ADARSHA WOMENS COLLEGE | RAJSHAHI | Non Govt. | 127145 | KRISNAPUR |
| 2594 | HAROGRAM MODEL BUSINESS INSTITUTE (HMBI) | RAJSHAHI | Non Govt. | | RAJSHAHI COURT |
| 2595 | MOHANPUR MOHILA DEGREE COLLEGE | RAJSHAHI | Non Govt. | 126846 | MOHANPUR, RAJSHAHI |
| 2596 | JHALUKA DEGREE COLLEGE | RAJSHAHI | Non Govt. | 126663 | Amghachihat, Durgapur |
| 2597 | KOYEL ADARSHA COLLEGE | RAJSHAHI | Non Govt. | 127147 | Tanore |
| 2598 | ORIENTAL INSTITUTE OF BUSINESS ADMINISTRATION (OIBA) | RAJSHAHI | Non Govt. | | |
| 2599 | BASANTOKEDAR COLLEGE | RAJSHAHI | Non Govt. | 126844 | Mohanpur |
| 7301 | ABDUL GONI COLLEGE | RAJSHAHI | Non Govt. | 126258 | Bagha |
| 7302 | VARENDRA COLLEGE | RAJSHAHI | Non Govt. | 126488 | GHORAMARA |
| 7303 | KABI KAZI NAZRUL ISLAM COLLEGE | RAJSHAHI | Non Govt. | 126926 | |
| 2201 | SIRAJGANJ GOVT. COLLEGE | SIRAJGONJ | Govt. | 128461 | SIRAJGANJ SHADAR |
| 2202 | ISLAMIA GOVT. COLLEGE | SIRAJGONJ | Govt. | 128464 | SIRAJGONJ |
| 2203 | RASHIDAZZOHA GOVT. MAHILA COLLEGE | SIRAJGONJ | Govt. | 128463 | SIRAJGONJ |
| 2204 | MAULANA BHASANI COLLEGE | SIRAJGONJ | Non Govt. | 128465 | MUJIB SARAK |
| 2205 | GOVT. HAJI KORAP ALI COLLEGE | SIRAJGONJ | Govt. | 128113 | BOIDYAJAMTOIL |
| 2206 | CHOWHALI GOVT. COLLEGE | SIRAJGONJ | Govt. | 128074 | |
| 2207 | KAZIPUR MANSUR ALI GOVT. COLLEGE | SIRAJGONJ | Govt. | 128185 | CKAZIPUR |
| 2208 | ABDULLAH AL MAHMUD DEGREE COLLEGE | SIRAJGONJ | Non Govt. | 128457 | BAGBATI, SIRAJGANJ |
| 2209 | RAFATULLAH IFAZUDDIN MEMORIAL COLLEGE | SIRAJGONJ | Non Govt. | 128188 | TENGLAHATA |
| 2210 | GOVT. AKBAR ALI COLLEGE | SIRAJGONJ | Govt. | 128676 | ULLAPARA, SIRAJGONJ |
| 2211 | HAJI WAHED MARIAM COLLEGE | SIRAJGONJ | Non Govt. | 128276 | CHANDAIKONA |
| 2212 | SALONGA COLLEGE | SIRAJGONJ | Non Govt. | 128275 | SALONGA, RAYGONJ |
| 2213 | TARASH COLLEGE | SIRAJGONJ | Non Govt. | 128544 | ARASH |
| 2214 | SHAHJADPUR GOVT. COLLEGE | SIRAJGONJ | Govt. | 128355 | SHAHZADPUR |
| 2215 | JAMIRTA COLLEGE | SIRAJGONJ | Non Govt. | 128358 | JAMIRTA |
| 2216 | BELKUCHI GOVERNMENT COLLEGE | SIRAJGONJ | Govt. | 128028 | MUKUNDAGANTI, SHOHAGPUR |
| 2217 | GOVERNMENT NURUNNAHAR TARKABAGISH COLLEGE | SIRAJGONJ | Govt. | 128274 | RAIGONJ |
| 2219 | SATBARIA DEGREE COLLEGE | SIRAJGONJ | Non Govt. | 128360 | KHASSATBARIA |
| 2220 | GHORASAL SAHITTIK BARKAT ULLAH COLLEGE | SIRAJGONJ | Non Govt. | 128359 | BETKANDI |
| 2221 | AFZAL HOSSAIN MEMORIAL COLLEGE | SIRAJGONJ | Non Govt. | 128182 | CHALITADANGA |
| 2222 | JAMUNA COLLEGE | SIRAJGONJ | Non Govt. | 128467 | SAROTIA, SAYADABAD |
| 2223 | NATUARPARA COLLEGE | SIRAJGONJ | Non Govt. | 128187 | NATUAR PARA |
| 2224 | MOWLANA SAIFUDDIN YAHIA COLLEGE | SIRAJGONJ | Non Govt. | 128356 | SHAHZADPUR |
| 2225 | CHOWBARI DR. SALAM JAHANARA COLLEGE | SIRAJGONJ | Non Govt. | 128112 | CHOWBARI |
| 2226 | KONABARI SHAHIDUL BULBUL COLLEGE | SIRAJGONJ | Non Govt. | 128114 | SHAHIDNAGAR |
| 2227 | TARASH MAHILA COLLEGE | SIRAJGONJ | Non Govt. | 128541 | TARASH |
| 2228 | GULTA BAZAR SHAHID M. MANSUR ALI COLLEGE | SIRAJGONJ | Non Govt. | 128543 | GULTA BAZAR |
| 2229 | NEEM GACHHI COLLEGE | SIRAJGONJ | Non Govt. | 128279 | NEEM GACHHI, RAYGONJ |
| 2230 | ZINDANI COLLEGE | SIRAJGONJ | Non Govt. | 128542 | SHARIFABAD, TARASH |
| 2231 | DOBILA ISLAMPUR COLLEGE | SIRAJGONJ | Non Govt. | 128540 | DOBILA, TARASH |
| 2232 | AMINA MANSUR DEGREE COLLEGE | SIRAJGONJ | Non Govt. | 128189 | HARINATHPUR |
| 2233 | SHIMLA COLLEGE | SIRAJGONJ | Non Govt. | 128462 | SHAHANGASA |
| 2234 | KAMARKHAND WOMEN'S DEGREE COLLEGE | SIRAJGONJ | Non Govt. | 128115 | BAYDA JAMTOIL |
| 2235 | ALHAJ FORHAD ALI MEMORIAL COLLEGE | SIRAJGONJ | Non Govt. | 128179 | SHARISHABARI, JAMALPUR |
| 2236 | JATIYO TARUN SANGO BARA PANGASHI COLLEGE | SIRAJGONJ | Non Govt. | 128677 | BARAPANGASHI |
| 2237 | FULJORE DEGREE COLLEGE | SIRAJGONJ | Non Govt. | 128277 | NALKA, RAIGONJ |
| 2238 | SIMANTA BAZAR MAHILA DEGREE COLLEGE | SIRAJGONJ | Non Govt. | 128466 | POST-KURALIA |
| 2239 | SHAHZADPUR WOMEN'S COLLEGE | SIRAJGONJ | Non Govt. | 128361 | SHAHZADPUR |
| 2240 | MOHAMMAD NASIM CHALITADANGA WOMEN'S COLLEGE | SIRAJGONJ | Non Govt. | 128181 | CHALITADANGA |
| 2241 | GANDHAIL IDEAL COLLEGE | SIRAJGONJ | Non Govt. | 128184 | POST OFFICE-GANDHAIL |
| 2242 | DOWLATPUR DEGREE COLLEGE | SIRAJGONJ | Non Govt. | 128027 | DOWLATPUR |
| 2243 | GOVT. BANGABONDHU COLLEGE | SIRAJGONJ | Govt. | 128183 | SONAMUKHI HAT |
| 2245 | UDGARI COLLEGE | SIRAJGONJ | Non Govt. | 128190 | UDGARI, SIRAJGONG |
| 2246 | SIRAJGONJ LAW COLLEGE | SIRAJGONJ | Non Govt. | | sadar, sirajgong |
| 2247 | SIRAJGONJ B. ED. COLLEGE | SIRAJGONJ | Non Govt. | | B.A COLLEGE ROAD |
| 2248 | RAJAB ALI MEMORIAL BIGGAN COLLEGE | SIRAJGONJ | Non Govt. | 128454 | SOYADHANGORA |
| 2249 | RAJAPUR DEGREE COLLEGE | SIRAJGONJ | Non Govt. | 128024 | RAJAPUR |
| 2250 | BELKUCHI BAHUMUKHI WOMEN'S COLLEGE | SIRAJGONJ | Non Govt. | 128025 | BELKUCHI |
| 2251 | H. T. IMAM DEGREE COLLEGE | SIRAJGONJ | Non Govt. | 128675 | ULLAPARA R.S |
| 2252 | GOVT. BANGABANDHU MOHILA DEGREE COLLEGE | SIRAJGONJ | Govt. | 128362 | SHERKHALI, SHAHZADPUR |
| 2253 | KARATOA COLLEGE | SIRAJGONJ | Non Govt. | 128357 | TALGACHI |
| 2254 | PRINCIPAL ABUL HOSSAIN COLLEGE | SIRAJGONJ | Non Govt. | 128673 | KALIAKAIR |
| 2255 | D.K.B.U COLLEGE | SIRAJGONJ | Non Govt. | 128469 | BOHULY, SIRAJGONJ |
| 2256 | GAZAIL COLLEGE | SIRAJGONJ | Non Govt. | 128680 | GAZAIL BAZAR |
| 2257 | SALAP COLLEGE | SIRAJGONJ | Non Govt. | 128672 | SALAP |
| 2258 | RAIGONJ UPAZILA SADAR DHANGRARA WOMENS DEGREE COLLEGE | SIRAJGONJ | Non Govt. | 128281 | DHANGHARA, RAIGONJ |
| 2259 | GHONA KUCHIAMARA COLLEGE | SIRAJGONJ | Non Govt. | 128678 | kuchiamara, ullapara |
| 2260 | KHAMARGRAM COLLEGE | SIRAJGONJ | Non Govt. | 128076 | Chauhali |
| 2261 | DADPUR G R COLLEGE | SIRAJGONJ | Non Govt. | 128280 | Nalka, Royganj, Sirajganj |
| 2262 | RAJMAN COLLEGE | SIRAJGONJ | Non Govt. | 128679 | Ullapara, Sirajganj |
| 2263 | GRAMPANGASHI COLLEGE | SIRAJGONJ | Non Govt. | 128278 | BELKUCHI |
| 2264 | JANNAT ARA HENRY SCIENCE & TECHNOLOGY COLLEGE | SIRAJGONJ | Non Govt. | | |
| 2265 | BELKUCHI MODEL COLLEGE | SIRAJGONJ | Non Govt. | 128026 | BELKUCHI, SIRAJGONJ |
| 2266 | BANGAMATA SHEIKH FAJILATUNNESA MUJIB IDEAL GOVERNMENT COLLEGE | SIRAJGONJ | Govt. | 134354 | Chakmirjapur, Tarash |

== Khulna Region ==
| College Code | College Name | District | College Type | EIIN | Address |
|---|---|---|---|---|---|
| 101 | GOVT. P. C. COLLEGE | BAGERHAT | Govt. | 114830 | HARINKHANA |
| 102 | SHERE BANGLA COLLEGE | BAGERHAT | Non Govt. | 114876 | KHARAMKHALI |
| 103 | BAGERHAT GOVT. MAHILA COLLEGE | BAGERHAT | Govt. | 114831 | BAGERHAT |
| 104 | RAMPAL GOVT. COLLEGE | BAGERHAT | Govt. | 115226 | RAMPAL |
| 105 | GILATALA ABUL KALAM COLLEGE | BAGERHAT | Non Govt. | 115225 | GILATALA |
| 106 | MORELGANJ SIRAJUDDIN MEMO. COLLEGE | BAGERHAT | Govt. | 115155 | MORRELGONJ |
| 107 | KAZI AZHAR ALI COLLEGE | BAGERHAT | Non Govt. | 114922 | ATTAKI |
| 108 | KHALILUR RAHMAN COLLEGE | BAGERHAT | Non Govt. | 114983 | MOLLAHAT |
| 109 | SHARANKHOLA DEGREE COLLEGE | BAGERHAT | Govt. | 115263 | Rayenda Bazar |
| 110 | MONGLA GOVT. COLLEGE | BAGERHAT | Govt. | 115021 | SHELABUNIA |
| 111 | ROWSHAN ARA SMRITI MAHILA COLLEGE | BAGERHAT | Non Govt. | 115155 | MORRELGONJ |
| 112 | KACHUA COLLEGE | BAGERHAT | Non Govt. | 114953 | KACHUA |
| 113 | SUNDARBAN MAHILA COLLEGE | BAGERHAT | Non Govt. | 115227 | SUNDARBAN |
| 114 | GOVT. FAKIRHAT FAZILATUNNESSA MUJIB MAHILA COLLEGE | BAGERHAT | Govt. | 114921 | ATTAKA, FAKIRHAT, |
| 115 | A. R. KHAN DEGREE COLLEGE | BAGERHAT | Non Govt. | 115156 | SANNYASHI BAZAR |
| 116 | SHAHID SMRITI COLLEGE | BAGERHAT | Non Govt. | 114923 | TOWN NOWAPARA, FAKIRHAT |
| 117 | GOVT. SHAHID SHEIKH ABU NASER MAHILA COLLEGE | BAGERHAT | Govt. | 114952 | KACHUA, BAGERHAT |
| 118 | DIGRAJ DEGREE MAHAVIDYALAYA | BAGERHAT | Non Govt. | 118 | DIGRAJ, MONGLA, BAGERHAT |
| 119 | BAGERHAT LAW COLLEGE | BAGERHAT | Non Govt. | | amlapara, bagerhat sadar |
| 120 | D. MIA ABBAS UDDIN TEACHERS' TRAINING COLLEGE | BAGERHAT | Non Govt. | | MORRELGONJ |
| 121 | GOVT. PHYSICAL EDUCATION COLLEGE | BAGERHAT | Govt. | | Saira, Sreeghat, Bagerhat |
| 122 | BELAYET HOSSAIN DEGREE COLLEGE | BAGERHAT | Non Govt. | 114833 | DEPARA |
| 125 | SALIMABAD DEGREE COLLEGE | BAGERHAT | Non Govt. | 115154 | DAIBAJNAHATI |
| 126 | SHEIKH HELAL UDDIN GOVT. COLLEGE | BAGERHAT | Govt. | 114924 | SHUBHADIA, FAKIRHAT |
| 127 | KALIDAS BARAL SMRITI COLLEGE | BAGERHAT | Non Govt. | 114877 | KHASHERHAT BAZAR |
| 128 | GOVT. BANGABANDHU MOHILA COLLEGE | BAGERHAT | Govt. | 115023 | ARUABORNI, CHITALMARI |
| 129 | KHAN JAHAN ALI COLLEGE | BAGERHAT | Non Govt. | 114832 | DASHANI, BAGERHAT |
| 130 | BANGABANDHU MOHILA GOVT. COLLEGE | BAGERHAT | Govt. | 114875 | MONGLA |
| 131 | MATREEBHASHA COLLEGE | BAGERHAT | Non Govt. | 115264 | Dhansagar, Sharankhola |
| 132 | MA BABAR RHIN COLLEGE | BAGERHAT | Non Govt. | 115159 | Baharbunia, Morrelganj |
| 133 | LAILA AZAD COLLEGE | BAGERHAT | Non Govt. | 114981 | |
| 801 | CHUADANGA GOVT. COLLEGE | CHUADANGA | Govt. | 115383 | CHUADANGA |
| 802 | ADARSHA MAHILA COLLEGE | CHUADANGA | Govt. | 115384 | BUJRUK GARGARI |
| 803 | CHUADANGA POURA COLLEGE | CHUADANGA | Non Govt. | 115382 | CHUADANGA |
| 804 | ALAMDANGA GOVERNMENT COLLEGE | CHUADANGA | Govt. | 115330 | ALAMDANGA |
| 805 | M. S. ZOHA DEGREE COLLEGE, ALAMDANGA | CHUADANGA | Non Govt. | 115329 | HARDI, ALAMDANGA |
| 806 | DARSHANA GOVT. COLLEGE | CHUADANGA | Govt. | 115428 | DARSHANA |
| 807 | JIBON NAGAR DEGREE COLLEGE | CHUADANGA | Non Govt. | 115461 | JIBANNAGAR |
| 808 | ABDUL WADUD SHAH COLLEGE | CHUADANGA | Non Govt. | 115429 | DAMURHUDA |
| 809 | ALAMDANGA MOHILA DEGREE COLLEGE | CHUADANGA | Non Govt. | 115332 | WAPDA COLONY |
| 810 | BADARGONJ COLLEGE | CHUADANGA | Non Govt. | 115381 | BADARGONJ |
| 811 | NIGAR SIDDIK DEGREE COLLEGE | CHUADANGA | Non Govt. | 115331 | MUNSHIGONJ |
| 812 | JIBANNAGAR GOVT. ADARSHA MOHILA DEGREE COLLEGE | CHUADANGA | Govt. | 115461 | JIBANNAGAR |
| 813 | KHASHKARARA COLLEGE | CHUADANGA | Non Govt. | 115333 | khashkarara, alamdanga |
| 814 | BOROSOLUA NEW MODEL COLLEGE | CHUADANGA | Non Govt. | 115380 | JOYNAGAR |
| 815 | KARPASHDANGA MAHABIDDYALYA | CHUADANGA | Non Govt. | 115430 | DAMURHUDA |
| 816 | UTHALI COLLEGE | CHUADANGA | Non Govt. | 115463 | UTHALI COLLEGE |
| 601 | GOVT. KESHAB CHANDRA COLLEGE | JENAIDHA | Govt. | 116552 | JHENIDAH |
| 602 | SAILKUPA GOVT. COLLEGE | JENAIDHA | Govt. | 116825 | SHAILKUPA, JHENAIDAH |
| 603 | GOVT. LALAN SHAH COLLEGE | JENAIDHA | Govt. | 116444 | HARINAKUNDU, JHENAIDAH |
| 604 | GOVT. NURUNNAHAR MAHILA COLLEGE | JENAIDHA | Govt. | 116550 | JHENIDAH |
| 605 | JHENAIDAH COLLEGE | JENAIDHA | Non Govt. | 116551 | ARAP PUR |
| 606 | KHONDOKAR MOSHARRAF HOSSAIN GOVT. COLLEGE | JENAIDHA | Govt. | 116676 | KOTCHANDPUR |
| 607 | MAHESHPUR GOVERNMENT DEGREE COLLEGE | JENAIDHA | Govt. | 116752 | MAHESHPUR |
| 608 | GOVT. MAHTABUDDIN COLLEGE | JENAIDHA | Govt. | 116633 | NALDANGA, KALIGANJ |
| 609 | SHEIKPARA DUKHI MAHMUD COLLEGE | JENAIDHA | Non Govt. | 116828 | BOSONTOPUR |
| 610 | KOTCHANDPUR POURA MOHILA COLLEGE | JENAIDHA | Non Govt. | 116675 | KOTCHANDPUR |
| 611 | AMINA KHATUN COLLEGE | JENAIDHA | Non Govt. | 116548 | NARIKELBARIA |
| 612 | SAFDERPUR - DORA COLLEGE | JENAIDHA | Non Govt. | 116673 | SAFDARPUR |
| 613 | JARIP BISWAS DEGREE COLLEGE | JENAIDHA | Non Govt. | 297838 | BAGUTIA |
| 614 | MIA ZINNAH ALAM COLLEGE | JENAIDHA | Non Govt. | 116826 | GARAGONJ, SHAILKUPA |
| 615 | A. ROUF DEGREE COLLEGE | JENAIDHA | Non Govt. | 116556 | DAKBANGLA BAZER |
| 616 | SHEIKH HASINA PADMA PUKUR GOVT. DEGREE COLLEGE | JENAIDHA | Govt. | 116753 | GURDAHA |
| 617 | RAICHARAN TARINICHARAN DEGREE COLLEGE | JENAIDHA | Non Govt. | 116553 | GOPALPUR |
| 618 | SHAHEED ZIAUR RAHMAN LAW COLLEGE | JENAIDHA | Non Govt. | 133628 | Bangabandu road |
| 619 | SALEHA BEGUM MOHILA COLLEGE | JENAIDHA | Non Govt. | 116443 | HARINAKUNDU |
| 620 | MOHESHPUR POURO MOHILA COLLEGE | JENAIDHA | Non Govt. | 116754 | MOHESHPUR |
| 621 | SHAHID ZIA-UR RAHMAN COLLEGE, FATEPUR | JENAIDHA | Non Govt. | 116750 | KHALISHPUR |
| 622 | SHAILKUPA CITY COLLEGE | JENAIDHA | Non Govt. | 116821 | SHAILKUPA |
| 623 | MD. SHAHIDUL ISLAM COLLEGE | JENAIDHA | Non Govt. | 116748 | BHAIROBA |
| 624 | BIDWA SAGAR TEACHERS' TRAINING COLLEGE | JENAIDHA | Non Govt. | 133610 | 144 sher-e-bangla road |
| 625 | JHENAIDAH ADARSHA TEACHERS' TRAINING COLLEGE | JENAIDHA | Non Govt. | | moulana basani road |
| 626 | MUKTIJADDAH MOSHIUR RAHMAN DEGREE COLLEGE | JENAIDHA | Non Govt. | 116557 | LAUDIA, JHENIDAH |
| 627 | ALHAZ AMZAD ALI AND FAIZUR RAHMAN MOHILA COLLEGE | JENAIDHA | Non Govt. | 116632 | NALDANGA |
| 628 | ADIL UDDIN COLLEGE | JENAIDHA | Non Govt. | 116827 | LANGALBANDH |
| 629 | GOVT. BANGABANDHU MEMORIAL COLLEGE | JENAIDHA | Govt. | 116822 | SHAILAKUPA |
| 630 | G. T. COLLEGE | JENAIDHA | Non Govt. | 116677 | TALSAR |
| 631 | KATLAGARI COLLEGE | JENAIDHA | Non Govt. | 116829 | KATLAGARI BAZAR |
| 632 | GOVT. BIRSHRESTHA SHAHID HAMIDUR RAHMAN DEGREE COLLEGE | JENAIDHA | Govt. | 116749 | KHALISHPUR |
| 633 | SHAILKUPA MOHILA DEGREE COLLEGE | JENAIDHA | Non Govt. | 116823 | SHAILKUPA |
| 634 | HAZI ARSHAD ALI COLLEGE | JENAIDHA | Non Govt. | 116445 | BHALKI BAZAR, HARINAKUNDU |
| 635 | DR. SAIFUL ISLAM COLLEGE | JENAIDHA | Non Govt. | | Mandarbaria, Moheshpur |
| 636 | AL-HAZ MOSIUR RAHMAN COLLEGE | JENAIDHA | Non Govt. | 116558 | GANNA BAZAR |
| 637 | JATEER JANAK BANGABANDHU SHEIKH MUGIB MEMORIAL DEGREE COLLEGE | JENAIDHA | Govt. | 131909 | GOURINATHPUR |
| 638 | KOTCHANDPUR POURO COLLEGE | JENAIDHA | Non Govt. | 116674 | KASHIPUR, KOTCHANDPUR |
| 639 | BAROBAZAR COLLEGE | JENAIDHA | Non Govt. | 116634 | KALIGANJ, JHENAIDAH |
| 640 | SHAHID NUR ALI COLLEGE | JENAIDHA | Non Govt. | 116630 | Kaligonj, Jhenaidah |
| 641 | A & J COLLEGE | JENAIDHA | Non Govt. | 116554 | Jhenaidah sadar |
| 642 | MOSHARRAF HOSSAIN COLLEGE | JENAIDHA | Non Govt. | 116549 | JENAIDHA |
| 644 | JADOBPUR COLLEGE | JENAIDHA | Non Govt. | 116751 | |
| 501 | GOVT. MICHAEL MADHUSUDAN COLLEGE | JESSORE | Govt. | 116101 | KHORKI |
| 502 | KAZI NAZRUL ISLAM COLLEGE | JESSORE | Non Govt. | 116100 | HABITPUR |
| 503 | GOVT. SHAHID SIRAJUDDIN HOSSAIN COLLEGE | JESSORE | Govt. | 115635 | GOURNAGAR, BAGHARPARA |
| 504 | UPASHAHAR COLLEGE | JESSORE | Non Govt. | 116106 | Newtown, Upashahar |
| 505 | JESSORE CANTONMENT COLLEGE | JESSORE | Non Govt. | 116109 | JESSORE CANTONMENT |
| 506 | JESSORE GOVT. MAHILA COLLEGE | JESSORE | Govt. | 116107 | KARBALA ROAD |
| 507 | JESSORE GOVT. CITY COLLEGE | JESSORE | Govt. | 116108 | NORAIL ROAD, JESSORE |
| 508 | MONIRAMPUR GOVT. COLLEGE | JESSORE | Govt. | 116310 | MONIRAMPUR |
| 509 | MONIRAMPUR MAHILA COLLEGE | JESSORE | Non Govt. | 116308 | MONIRAMPUR |
| 510 | KESHABPUR GOVT. COLLEGE | JESSORE | Govt. | 115944 | KESHABPUR |
| 511 | HAZI ABDUL MOTALEB MAHILA COLLEGE | JESSORE | Non Govt. | 115946 | KESHABPUR |
| 512 | JHICKERGACHHA SHAHID MASHIUR RAHMAN COLLEGE | JESSORE | Govt. | 115804 | JHIKARGACHA |
| 513 | CHOWGACHHA GOVT. COLLEGE | JESSORE | Govt. | 115718 | CHOWGACHA |
| 514 | NAVARON DEGREE COLLEGE | JESSORE | Non Govt. | 116384 | JADABPUR, NAVARON |
| 515 | DR. AFIL UDDIN COLLEGE | JESSORE | Non Govt. | 116382 | BAGACHARA |
| 516 | NOAPARA GOVERNMENT COLLEGE | JESSORE | Govt. | 115543 | NOAPARA |
| 517 | MASHIAHATI COLLEGE | JESSORE | Non Govt. | 116311 | MASHIAHATI, JESSORE |
| 518 | SINGIA ADARSHA COLLEGE | JESSORE | Non Govt. | 116099 | BANIRGATI, JANGALBADHAL |
| 519 | BAGHARPARA COLLEGE | JESSORE | Non Govt. | 115636 | BAGHARPARA |
| 520 | BANKRA DEGREE COLLEGE | JESSORE | Non Govt. | 115807 | S.BAN2RA, JHIKARGACHA |
| 521 | CHOWGACHA MRIDHAPARA MAHILA COLLEGE | JESSORE | Non Govt. | 115714 | CHOWGACHA |
| 522 | HAMIDPUR AL-HERA COLLEGE | JESSORE | Non Govt. | 116102 | HAMIDPUR, JESSORE SADAR |
| 523 | TALBARIA DEGREE COLLEGE | JESSORE | Non Govt. | 116097 | TALBARIA |
| 524 | NAWAPARA MAHILA COLLEGE | JESSORE | Non Govt. | 115545 | NOAPARA |
| 525 | MUKTIJODDHA COLLEGE | JESSORE | Non Govt. | 116111 | RUDRAPUR |
| 526 | UPASHAHAR MAHILA DEGREE COLLEGE | JESSORE | Non Govt. | 116105 | UPASHAHAR |
| 527 | BANGLADESH COMPUTER AND MANAGEMENT COLLEGE | JESSORE | Non Govt. | | East Barandi Para |
| 528 | JESSORE COLLEGE | JESSORE | Non Govt. | 116110 | SHANKARPUR |
| 529 | SHAMMILANY MAHILA COLLEGE | JESSORE | Non Govt. | 115806 | JHIKARGACHA |
| 530 | JHIKORGACHA MOHILA COLLEGE | JESSORE | Non Govt. | 115805 | JHIKORGACHA |
| 531 | GANGANANDAPUR DEGREE COLLEGE | JESSORE | Non Govt. | 115803 | GANGANANDAPUR |
| 532 | MUKTESWARI DEGREE COLLEGE | JESSORE | Non Govt. | 168005 | MONIRAMPUR |
| 533 | KAPATACKHA SHAMMILANI DEGREE COLLEGE | JESSORE | Non Govt. | 115943 | BARANDALI |
| 534 | GOVT. BIR SHRESTHA NOOR MOHAMMAD DEGREE COLLEGE | JESSORE | Govt. | 116385 | TABARIA, SHALKONA |
| 535 | SAMMILANI DEGREE COLLEGE | JESSORE | Non Govt. | 116309 | MADANPUR |
| 536 | FAZILATUNNESA GOVT. WOMEN'S COLLEGE | JESSORE | Govt. | 116383 | NAVARAN |
| 537 | SALUA ADARSHA DEGREE COLLEGE | JESSORE | Non Govt. | 115720 | CHOWGACHA |
| 538 | SHOHEED MOSHIUR RAHMAN LAW COLLEGE | JESSORE | Non Govt. | | Narail road |
| 539 | A. B. C. D. COLLEGE | JESSORE | Non Govt. | 115712 | CHOWGACHA |
| 540 | HIZAL DANGA SHAHID FLIGHTLT. MASUD MEMORIAL COLLEGE | JESSORE | Non Govt. | 115945 | HIZALDANGA |
| 541 | BENAPOLE COLLEGE | JESSORE | Non Govt. | 116387 | BENAPOLE |
| 542 | GOVT. TEACHERS' TRAINING COLLEGE | JESSORE | Govt. | | jessore-sadar |
| 543 | MUNSHI MEHERULLAH TEACHERS' TRAINING COLLEGE | JESSORE | Non Govt. | | AIR PORT ROAD, PURATAN KOSBA |
| 544 | JESSORE SHIKKHAK PROSHIKHAN COLLEGE, PALBARI | JESSORE | Non Govt. | | PALBARI |
| 545 | AMDABAD COLLEGE | JESSORE | Non Govt. | 133762 | AMDABAD BAZAR |
| 546 | NOAPARA MODEL COLLEGE | JESSORE | Non Govt. | 115544 | NOAPARA |
| 547 | NARIKEL BARIA DEGREE COLLEGE | JESSORE | Non Govt. | 115639 | NARIKELBARIA |
| 548 | KESHABPUR PHYSICAL EDUCATION COLLEGE | JESSORE | Non Govt. | | keshobpur |
| 549 | JESSORE PHYSICAL EDUCATION COLLEGE | JESSORE | Non Govt. | | New uposhahor |
| 550 | UPASHAHAR TEACHERS' TRAINING COLLEGE | JESSORE | Non Govt. | 133792 | 236, sector-1, Upshahor |
| 551 | BANGLADESH SOUTH WEST MODEL INSTITUTE | JESSORE | Non Govt. | | 1 NO. NARIAL ROAD |
| 552 | S.M. SULTAN FINE ART COLLEGE | JESSORE | Non Govt. | | |
| 554 | RUPDIA SHAHEED SMRITY COLLEGE | JESSORE | Non Govt. | 116103 | RUPDIA. SDAR |
| 555 | RAJGONJ DEGREE COLLEGE | JESSORE | Non Govt. | 116304 | MONOHORPUR |
| 556 | NATUNHAT PUBLIC COLLEGE | JESSORE | Non Govt. | 116098 | GAZIR DARGAH |
| 557 | BAGHAR PARA MOHILA COLLEGE | JESSORE | Non Govt. | 115642 | BAGARPARA |
| 558 | VANGURA ADARSHA DEGREE COLLEGE | JESSORE | Non Govt. | 115640 | VANGURA |
| 559 | MIRJAPUR ADARSHA WOMEN COLLEGE | JESSORE | Non Govt. | 115638 | GOURNAGAR |
| 561 | PAKSHIA IDEAL COLLEGE | JESSORE | Non Govt. | 116386 | PAKSHIA BAZAR |
| 563 | PANJIA MAHAVIDYALAYA | JESSORE | Non Govt. | 115948 | PAJIA, KESHABPUR |
| 564 | DR. ABDUR RAZZAK MUNICIPAL COLLEGE | JESSORE | Non Govt. | 564 | STADIAMPARA, KHARKI |
| 565 | SHIMULIA DEGREE COLLEGE | JESSORE | Non Govt. | 115808 | SHIMULIA |
| 566 | SOUTHERN INSTITUTE OF BUSINESS AND INFORMATION TECHNOLOGY (SIBIT) | JESSORE | Non Govt. | | PURATAN KASBA |
| 567 | GABKHALI MAGURA UNITED COLLEGE | JESSORE | Non Govt. | 115549 | AVOYNAGAR |
| 568 | BHABADAHA COLLEGE | JESSORE | Non Govt. | 115541 | CHECHURIA BAZAR |
| 569 | BHOYRAB ADARSHA COLLEGE | JESSORE | Non Govt. | 115548 | Siddhipasha, Abhynagor |
| 570 | S. M. HABIBUR RAHMAN POURO COLLEGE | JESSORE | Non Govt. | 132020 | CHOGACHKA |
| 571 | TARIQUL ISLAM PAWRO COLLEGE | JESSORE | Non Govt. | 115721 | Esapur, Jessore |
| 307 | RAYERMOHAL COLLEGE | KHULNA | Non Govt. | 117110 | KHALISHPUR |
| 308 | METROPOLITAN COLLEGE | KHULNA | Non Govt. | 117432 | SABUJBAGH |
| 309 | KHANJAHAN ALI COLLEGE OF SCIENCE & TECHNOLOGY | KHULNA | Non Govt. | 133357 | B-6 MAJID SARANI |
| 310 | KOYRA GOVERNMENT MOHILA COLLEGE | KHULNA | Govt. | 117239 | KOYRA |
| 311 | ALAIPUR COLLEGE | KHULNA | Non Govt. | 117394 | ALIPUR |
| 312 | KHULNA GOVT. MAHILA COLLEGE | KHULNA | Govt. | 117107 | BOYRA, KHULNA |
| 313 | AZAM KHAN GOVT. COMMERCE COLLEGE | KHULNA | Govt. | 117165 | 3, BABU KHAN ROAD |
| 314 | AHSANULLAH COLLEGE | KHULNA | Non Govt. | 117427 | 31 K, D, A AVINUE |
| 315 | GOVT. SUNDARBAN ADARSHA COLLEGE | KHULNA | Govt. | 117167 | KHAN JAHAN ALI ROAD |
| 316 | GOVT. M. M. CITY COLLEGE | KHULNA | Govt. | 117170 | 300, KHAN JAHAN ALI ROAD |
| 317 | SHAHID SUHRAWARDI COLLEGE | KHULNA | Non Govt. | 117426 | 28, sscollege road, BANORGATI BAZAR |
| 318 | RUPSHA COLLEGE | KHULNA | Non Govt. | 117391 | RUPSHA EAST |
| 319 | PIONEER GOVERNMENT MAHILA COLLEGE | KHULNA | Govt. | 117166 | SOUTH CENTRAL ROAD |
| 320 | HAJI ABDUL MALEK ISLAMIA COLLEGE | KHULNA | Non Govt. | 117168 | SHIPYARD |
| 321 | GOVT. HAJI MD. MOHSIN COLLEGE | KHULNA | Govt. | 117109 | HAUGING ESTATE |
| 322 | GOVT. B. L. COLLEGE | KHULNA | Govt. | 116954 | KHULNA |
| 323 | MOHSIN MAHILA COLLEGE | KHULNA | Non Govt. | 116955 | DAULATPUR |
| 324 | DAULATPUR DAY/NIGHT COLLEGE | KHULNA | Non Govt. | 116953 | PABLA, DAULATPUR |
| 325 | BAJUA SURENDRANATH COLLEGE | KHULNA | Non Govt. | 116923 | BAJUA, BAJUA |
| 326 | GOVT. M. A. MAJID COLLEGE | KHULNA | Govt. | 117079 | DIGHOLIA, |
| 327 | GOVT. NORTH KHULNA COLLEGE | KHULNA | Govt. | 117461 | TEROKHADA |
| 328 | DUMURIA COLLEGE | KHULNA | Non Govt. | 117052 | DUMURIA |
| 329 | GOVT. BATIAGHATA DEGREE COLLEGE | KHULNA | Govt. | 116865 | BATIAGHATA |
| 330 | GOVT. SHAHPUR MADHUGRAM COLLEGE | KHULNA | Govt. | 117055 | SHAHPUR |
| 331 | FULTALA M. M. COLLEGE | KHULNA | Non Govt. | 117355 | FULTALA |
| 332 | PAIKGACHA GOVT. COLLEGE | KHULNA | Govt. | 117323 | PAIKGACHA, PAIKGACHA |
| 333 | KAPILMUNI COLLEGE | KHULNA | Non Govt. | 117322 | KAPILMUNI |
| 334 | GOVT. BANGABANDHU COLLEGE | KHULNA | Govt. | 117393 | AICHGATI, BELFULIA |
| 335 | ALHAJ SARWAR KHAN COLLEGE | KHULNA | Non Govt. | 117080 | SENHATI, DIGHOLIA |
| 336 | SABURANNESA MAHILA COLLEGE | KHULNA | Non Govt. | 117169 | 23/1, GAGAN BABU ROAD |
| 337 | FASIAR RAHMAN MAHILA COLLEGE | KHULNA | Non Govt. | 117321 | SARAL, PAIKGACHA, PAIKGACHA |
| 338 | KHAN SHAHEB KOMORUDDIN COLLEGE | KHULNA | Non Govt. | 117241 | JAIGIRMOHAL, AMADI, KOYRA |
| 339 | SHAHID SMRITI MAHILA COLLEGE | KHULNA | Non Govt. | 117054 | DUMURIA |
| 340 | GOVT. PHULTALA MAHILA COLLEGE | KHULNA | Govt. | 117356 | ALKA, PHULTALA |
| 341 | KHULNA ISLAMIA COLLEGE | KHULNA | Non Govt. | 117430 | BOYRA GPO |
| 342 | KHANJAHAN ALI ADARSHA COLLEGE | KHULNA | Non Govt. | 117128 | SHIROMONI INDUSTRIAL AREA |
| 343 | INSTITUTE OF LIBRARY, ARTS, COMMERCE & SCIENCE (ILACS) | KHULNA | Non Govt. | | 5/1, Korpara Road, Tutpara |
| 344 | KHULNA COLLEGE | KHULNA | Non Govt. | 117428 | KHANJAHAN NOGOR |
| 345 | MOULANA BHASHANI MEMORIAL COLLEGE | KHULNA | Non Govt. | 117056 | BANIAKHALI, SHARAFPUR, |
| 346 | CITY GIRLS COLLEGE | KHULNA | Non Govt. | 117431 | 75/2 HAZI ISMAIL ROAD |
| 348 | GOVT. L. B. K. DEGREE WOMEN'S COLLEGE | KHULNA | Govt. | 116925 | KHUTAKHALI BAJUA |
| 349 | SHAHEED AYUB & MUSA MEMORIAL (DEGREE) COLLEGE | KHULNA | Non Govt. | 117320 | GARAIKHALI |
| 351 | CITY LAW COLLEGE | KHULNA | Non Govt. | | 28, AHASAN AHAMED ROAD |
| 352 | CENTRAL LAW COLLEGE | KHULNA | Non Govt. | | 7, BANE BABU ROAD |
| 353 | GOVT. TEACHERS' TRAINING COLLEGE | KHULNA | Govt. | 117135 | Khulna sadar, Khulna |
| 355 | INSTITUTE OF EDUCATION LIBRARY AND MANAGEMENT (IELAM) | KHULNA | Non Govt. | | BOYRA |
| 358 | SHAHID ABUL KASHEM COLLEGE | KHULNA | Non Govt. | 116869 | KAIYA BAZAR |
| 359 | CHALNA MOBARAK MEMORIAL COLLEGE | KHULNA | Non Govt. | 116924 | CHALNA BAZAR |
| 360 | AMIRUL ISLAM KAGOJI TEACHERS' TRAINING COLLEGE | KHULNA | Non Govt. | | Paikgasa, Khulna |
| 361 | POLLISREE DEGREE COLLEGE | KHULNA | Non Govt. | 117050 | MADARTALA |
| 362 | KAPOTAKSHMA COLLEGE | KHULNA | Non Govt. | 117240 | MADINABAD |
| 363 | CHALNA COLLEGE | KHULNA | Non Govt. | 116928 | CHALNA |
| 364 | CHUKNAGAR COLLEGE | KHULNA | Non Govt. | 117053 | CHUKNAGAR |
| 365 | HORIDHALI KAPILMUNI MOHILA COLLEGE | KHULNA | Non Govt. | 117326 | RAMCHANDRANAGOR |
| 366 | MAHESHWARPASHA SHAHID ZIA COLLEGE | KHULNA | Non Govt. | 116952 | KUET, DAULATPUR |
| 367 | CHITTRA MOHILA DEGREE COLLEGE | KHULNA | Non Govt. | 117462 | TEROKHADA |
| 368 | SYED ARSHAD ALI AND SABURUNNESSA GIRLS COLLEGE | KHULNA | Non Govt. | 117392 | KHULNA |
| 1001 | KUSHTIA GOVT. COLLEGE | KUSHTIA | Govt. | 117808 | KUSHTIA |
| 1002 | KUSHTIA ADARSHA DEGREE MAHABIDYALAYA | KUSHTIA | Non Govt. | 117811 | MILL PARA |
| 1003 | KUSHTIA GOVT. MAHILA COLLEGE | KUSHTIA | Govt. | 117810 | JILKHANA MORE |
| 1004 | KUSHTIA ISLAMIA COLLEGE | KUSHTIA | Non Govt. | 117809 | N. S ROAD KUSHTIA |
| 1005 | KUMARKHALI GOVT. COLLEGE | KUSHTIA | Govt. | 117729 | BATIKAMARA |
| 1006 | KHOKSHA GOVT. COLLEGE | KUSHTIA | Govt. | 117652 | KHOKSHA, JANIPUR |
| 1007 | SHOMSPUR ABU TALEB DEGREE COLLEGE | KUSHTIA | Non Govt. | 117651 | SHOMOSPUR, KHOKSA |
| 1008 | BHERAMARA GOVT. COLLEGE | KUSHTIA | Govt. | 117497 | OLLEGE PARA, |
| 1009 | BHERAMARA GOVT. MAHILA COLLEGE | KUSHTIA | Govt. | 117499 | BHERAMARA |
| 1010 | DAULATPUR COLLEGE | KUSHTIA | Non Govt. | 117606 | DAULATPUR |
| 1011 | PEOPLES COLLEGE | KUSHTIA | Non Govt. | 117609 | KHASH MATHURAPUR |
| 1012 | AMLA GOVT. DEGREE COLLEGE | KUSHTIA | Govt. | 117897 | AMLA, MIRPUR |
| 1013 | MIRPUR MAHAMUDA CHOWDHURY COLLEGE | KUSHTIA | Non Govt. | 117895 | MIRPUR |
| 1014 | BANSHGRAM ALAUDDIN AHMED COLLEGE | KUSHTIA | Non Govt. | 132037 | BANSHGRAM |
| 1015 | HALSA ADARSHA COLLEGE | KUSHTIA | Non Govt. | 117898 | HALSA BAZAR |
| 1016 | PHILIP NAGAR MARICHA COLLEGE | KUSHTIA | Non Govt. | 117610 | PHILIP NAGAR |
| 1017 | KHOLISHA KUNDI COLLEGE | KUSHTIA | Non Govt. | 117602 | KHALISHAKUNDI, KHALISHAKUNDI |
| 1018 | BHERAMARA ADARSHA COLLEGE | KUSHTIA | Non Govt. | 117498 | HOSPITAL ROAD |
| 1019 | KUMARKHALI ADARSHA MAHILA COLLEGE | KUSHTIA | Non Govt. | 117728 | KUMARKHALI |
| 1020 | NASIRUDDIN BISWAS MAHABIDDALAYA | KUSHTIA | Non Govt. | 117608 | BARAGANGDIA |
| 1021 | NURUZZAMAN BISWAS DEGREE COLLEGE | KUSHTIA | Non Govt. | 117605 | ALLARDARGA |
| 1022 | ALAUDDIN AHMED COLLEGE | KUSHTIA | Non Govt. | 117726 | ALAUDDIN NAGOR, CHARAIKOLE |
| 1023 | SHELAIDAH BISHWAKABI RABINDRANATH TAGORE COLLEGE | KUSHTIA | Non Govt. | 117731 | SHELAIDAH |
| 1024 | DR. MD. FAZLUL HAQUE GIRLS DEGREE COLLEGE | KUSHTIA | Non Govt. | 117603 | BAGOAN |
| 1025 | MIRPUR MOHILA DEGREE COLLEGE | KUSHTIA | Non Govt. | 117894 | MIRPUR, KUSHTIA |
| 1026 | KUSHTIA LAW COLLEGE | KUSHTIA | Non Govt. | 133508 | |
| 1027 | ALLAUDDIN AHMED TEACHERS' TRAINING COLLEGE, KUMARKHALI | KUSHTIA | Non Govt. | 133333 | ALAUDDIN NAGAR |
| 1028 | B. J. M. COLLEGE | KUSHTIA | Non Govt. | 117500 | BAHADURPUR |
| 1030 | ALAUDDIN AHMMED PHYSICAL INSTITUTE | KUSHTIA | Non Govt. | 133592 | ALAUDDIN NAGAR |
| 1032 | AL-HAJ SAIDUR RAHMAN MONTU WOMEN COLLEGE | KUSHTIA | Non Govt. | 117650 | KHOKSA-JANIPUR |
| 1033 | SYED MAS-UD RAMY COLLEGE | KUSHTIA | Non Govt. | 117816 | BORO BAZAR |
| 1034 | PANTI MAHABIDDALOY | KUSHTIA | Non Govt. | 117730 | PANTI, KUMARKHALI |
| 1035 | COLLEGE OF BUSINESS ADMINISTRATION AND TECHNOLOGY | KUSHTIA | Non Govt. | | 63/ r.r.c road |
| 1036 | KUSHTIA HAZI ABUL HOSSAIN INSTITUTE OF TECHNOLOGY | KUSHTIA | Non Govt. | | Nobin Tower, Dadapur Road |
| 1037 | MOHISHKUNDI COLLEGE | KUSHTIA | Non Govt. | 117611 | MOHISHKUNDI |
| 1038 | KHATER ALI DEGREE COLLEGE | KUSHTIA | Non Govt. | 117812 | LAXMIPUR |
| 1039 | PORADAH DEGREE COLLEGE | KUSHTIA | Non Govt. | 117896 | PORADAH, MIRPUR |
| 1040 | DHOKRAKOL DEGREE COLLEGE | KUSHTIA | Non Govt. | 117649 | MOHISHBATHAN |
| 1041 | SHAGAR KHALI ADARSHA COLLEGE | KUSHTIA | Non Govt. | | Chitalia, Mirpur |
| 1042 | DAULATPUR GIRLS COLLEGE | KUSHTIA | Non Govt. | 117607 | DAULATPUR |
| 1043 | GARAI MOHILA DEGREE COLLEGE | KUSHTIA | Non Govt. | 117814 | RAM CHANDRA ROY CHOWDHURY ROAD |
| 701 | GOVT. H. S. S. COLLEGE | MAGURA | Govt. | 118003 | M. R. ROAD, MAGURA |
| 702 | SREEPUR DEGREE COLLEGE | MAGURA | Govt. | 118174 | SREEPUR |
| 703 | AMINUR RAHMAN COLLEGE | MAGURA | Non Govt. | 118064 | MOHOMMADPUR |
| 704 | AMARESH BASU COLLEGE | MAGURA | Non Govt. | 118006 | ALOKDIA |
| 705 | BONAGATI DEGREE COLLEGE | MAGURA | Non Govt. | 118124 | BUNAGATI |
| 706 | ARPARA COLLEGE | MAGURA | Non Govt. | 118123 | ARPARA |
| 707 | Non Govt.AZIR AHMED COLLEGE | MAGURA | Non Govt. | 118002 | BEROIL POLITA |
| 708 | MAGURA ADARSHA COLLEGE | MAGURA | Non Govt. | 118005 | ADARSHAPARA |
| 709 | KAZI SALIMA HAQUE MAHILA COLLEGE | MAGURA | Non Govt. | 118063 | MOHAMMADPUR |
| 710 | NAKOL SAMMILANY DEGREE COLLEGE | MAGURA | Non Govt. | 118171 | NAKOL |
| 711 | G. K. IDEAL DEGREE COLLEGE | MAGURA | Non Govt. | 118173 | NAKOL, SREEPUR |
| 712 | BINODPUR DEGREE COLLEGE | MAGURA | Non Govt. | 118065 | BINODPUR |
| 713 | MAGURA TEACHERS' TRAINING COLLEGE | MAGURA | Non Govt. | | A.G Academy, M.R Road |
| 714 | MAGURA LAW COLLEGE | MAGURA | Non Govt. | | a.g academy |
| 715 | DARIAPUR DEGREE COLLEGE | MAGURA | Non Govt. | 118175 | MALAYNAGAR |
| 716 | BIHARILAL SHIKDER GOVT. COLLEGE | MAGURA | Govt. | 118125 | SINGRA, SHALIKHA |
| 717 | MAGURA GOVT. MOHILA COLLEGE | MAGURA | Govt. | 118004 | MAGURA |
| 718 | BABUKHALI ARDARSHA COLLEGE | MAGURA | Non Govt. | 118062 | SULTUNSHI |
| 719 | JAGDAL SOMMILONY COLLEGE | MAGURA | Non Govt. | 118001 | MAGURA SADAR |
| 720 | HAZIPUR SHAMMILONI DEGREE COLLEGE | MAGURA | Non Govt. | 118007 | HAZIPUR |
| 901 | MEHERPUR GOVT. COLLEGE | MEHERPUR | Govt. | 118342 | MEHERPUR |
| 902 | MEHERPUR GOVT. MAHILA COLLEGE | MEHERPUR | Govt. | 118343 | MAHILA COLLEGE ROAD |
| 903 | MUJIBNAGAR DEGREE COLLEGE | MEHERPUR | Govt. | 118283 | DARIAPUR |
| 904 | GANGNI DEGREE COLLEGE | MEHERPUR | Non Govt. | 118261 | GANGNI |
| 905 | GANGNI MOHILA DEGREE COLLEGE | MEHERPUR | Non Govt. | 118260 | GANGNI |
| 906 | SOHIUDDIN DEGREE COLLEGE | MEHERPUR | Non Govt. | 118339 | KATHULI ROAD |
| 907 | TERAIL-JOREPUKURIA COLLEGE | MEHERPUR | Non Govt. | 118256 | TERAILJOREPUKURIA |
| 908 | KAZIPUR COLLEGE | MEHERPUR | Non Govt. | 118258 | KAZIPUR |
| 909 | A. R. B. COLLEGE | MEHERPUR | Non Govt. | 118340 | AMJHUPI |
| 910 | KARAMDI COLLEGE | MEHERPUR | Non Govt. | 118262 | Gangni, Meherpur |
| 401 | NARAIL GOVT. VICTORIA COLLEGE | NARAIL | Govt. | 118527 | RAANGONJ |
| 402 | ABDUL HAYEE COLLEGE | NARAIL | Non Govt. | 118526 | MOHISHKHOLA |
| 403 | GOVT. SHAHID ABDUS SALAM COLLEGE | NARAIL | Govt. | 118385 | KALIA, NARAIL |
| 404 | LOHAGARA GOVT. ADARSHA COLLEGE | NARAIL | Govt. | 118437 | LOHAGARA |
| 405 | MUNSHI MANIK MIAH COLLEGE | NARAIL | Non Govt. | 118383 | BARDIA, |
| 406 | NABOGANGA COLLEGE | NARAIL | Non Govt. | 118438 | LOHAGARA |
| 407 | LAKSHMIPASHA ADARSHA DEGREE WOMENS' COLLEGE | NARAIL | Non Govt. | 118436 | LAXMIPASHA |
| 408 | MIRZAPUR UNITED DEGREE COLLEGE | NARAIL | Non Govt. | 118524 | MIRZAPUR |
| 409 | S. M. A. AHAD COLLEGE | NARAIL | Non Govt. | 118435 | LAHURIA |
| 410 | MAIJPARA COLLEGE | NARAIL | Non Govt. | 118530 | MODHYIAPALI |
| 411 | MONORANJAN KAPURIA COLLEGE | NARAIL | Non Govt. | 118382 | CHANCHURI PURULIA |
| 412 | SM SULTAN BENGAL CHARUKALA MOHABIDYALAY | NARAIL | Non Govt. | 137768 | MACHIMDIA |
| 413 | NARAIL GOVT MOHILA COLLEGE | NARAIL | Govt. | | magura road |
| 201 | SATKHIRA GOVT. COLLEGE | SATKHIRA | Govt. | 118906 | RAZAR BAGAN |
| 202 | SATKHIRA DAY/NIGHT COLLEGE | SATKHIRA | Non Govt. | 118908 | SATKHIRA |
| 203 | SATKHIRA CITY COLLEGE | SATKHIRA | Non Govt. | 118912 | RASULPUR |
| 204 | SATKHIRA GOVT. MAHILA COLLEGE | SATKHIRA | Govt. | 118910 | SATKHIRA |
| 205 | KUMIRA MAHILA DEGREE COLLEGE | SATKHIRA | Non Govt. | 119102 | KUMIRA, TALA |
| 206 | ASSASUNI GOVERNMENT COLLEGE | SATKHIRA | Govt. | 118609 | ASSASUNI |
| 207 | SHAYMNAGAR GOVT. MOHSIN COLLEGE | SATKHIRA | Govt. | 118992 | SHYAMNAGAR |
| 208 | KALIGANJ GOVT. COLLEGE | SATKHIRA | Govt. | 118793 | BAZARGRAM RAHIMPUR |
| 209 | KOLAROA GOVT. COLLEGE | SATKHIRA | Govt. | 118730 | KALAROA |
| 210 | GOVT. KHAN BAHADUR AHSANULLAH COLLEGE | SATKHIRA | Govt. | 118642 | SAKHIPUR, DEBHATA |
| 211 | TALA GOVT. COLLEGE | SATKHIRA | Govt. | 119103 | TALA, SATKHIRA |
| 212 | MUNSHIGONG COLLEGE | SATKHIRA | Non Govt. | 118994 | KADAMTALA |
| 213 | BHALUKA CHANDPUR ADRASHA DEGREE COLLEGE | SATKHIRA | Non Govt. | 118902 | BHALUKA CHANDPUR |
| 214 | SHIMANTA ADARSHA COLLEGE | SATKHIRA | Non Govt. | 118914 | BHARUKHALI |
| 215 | RAHIMA EZAHAR MEMORIAL B. ED. COLLEGE | SATKHIRA | Non Govt. | | tala, satkhira |
| 216 | NALTA AHSANIA MISSION RESIDENTIAL COLLEGE | SATKHIRA | Non Govt. | 118795 | NALTA MOBARAK NOGOR |
| 217 | SUNDERBAN SCIENCE AND BUSINESS COLLEGE | SATKHIRA | Non Govt. | | MUNSHIPARA |
| 218 | BANGABONDHU MOHILA COLLEGE | SATKHIRA | Non Govt. | 118728 | KALAROA |
| 219 | KAZIRHAT COLLEGE | SATKHIRA | Non Govt. | 118726 | KAZIRHAT |
| 220 | SHALIKHA COLLEGE | SATKHIRA | Non Govt. | 119106 | HARIHORNAGAR |
| 236 | SHEIKH AMANULLAH DEGREE COLLEGE | SATKHIRA | Non Govt. | 118729 | KALAROA |
| 237 | SHAHID SMRITI COLLEGE | SATKHIRA | Non Govt. | 118911 | BANSDAHA |
| 238 | ROKEYA MANSUR MAHILA COLLEGE | SATKHIRA | Non Govt. | 118794 | KALIGONJ |
| 239 | SHAMNAGAR ATARJAN MOHILA COLLEGE | SATKHIRA | Non Govt. | 119893 | NAKIPUR |
| 240 | TALA MOHILA COLLEGE | SATKHIRA | Non Govt. | 119105 | TALA |
| 241 | HAJI KEYAMUDDIN MEMORIAL MOHILA COLLEGE | SATKHIRA | Non Govt. | 118641 | SAKHIPUR |
| 242 | KATUNIA RAJBARI COLLEGE | SATKHIRA | Non Govt. | 118792 | PIRGAZON, KALIGONJ |
| 243 | SHAHEED MUKTIJODHYA MAHABIDYALYA | SATKHIRA | Non Govt. | 119107 | TALA |
| 244 | Non Govt.AWABENKI COLLEGE | SATKHIRA | Non Govt. | 118991 | NOWABENKI |
| 245 | SAFURANNESSA MOHILA COLLEGE | SATKHIRA | Non Govt. | 118909 | BANKAL |
| 246 | SATKHIRA LAW COLLEGE | SATKHIRA | Non Govt. | | SULTANPUR |
| 247 | KALARUA SHIKKHAK PROSHIKHAN COLLEGE, KALARUA | SATKHIRA | Non Govt. | | kalarua |
| 249 | A. P. S. MAHABIDDALOY | SATKHIRA | Non Govt. | 118608 | NAKNA |
| 250 | SUNDARBON SHIKKHOK PROSHIKHAN COLLEGE | SATKHIRA | Non Govt. | | MONSHIPARA |
| 251 | KALARUA PHYSICAL EDUCATION COLLEGE | SATKHIRA | Non Govt. | | Kalrua |
| 252 | ADVOCATE ABDUR RAHMAN COLLEGE, BINERPOTA | SATKHIRA | Non Govt. | 118907 | BENERPOTA |
| 253 | KAZI ALAUDDIN DEGREE COLLEGE | SATKHIRA | Non Govt. | 118797 | ZAFARPUR, TARALI |
| 254 | DEBHATA COLLEGE | SATKHIRA | Non Govt. | 118643 | DEBHATA |
| 255 | JHAUDANGA COLLEGE | SATKHIRA | Non Govt. | 118904 | JHAUDANGA |
| 256 | HAZI WAZED ALI TEACHERS' TRAINING COLLEGE | SATKHIRA | Non Govt. | | sultanpur |
| 257 | ASSASUNI MOHILLA COLLEGE | SATKHIRA | Non Govt. | 118610 | ASSASUNI |
| 258 | PATKELGHAT HARUN-OR-RASHID COLLEGE | SATKHIRA | Non Govt. | 119104 | PATKELGHATA |
| 259 | SHUVASHINI DEGREE COLLEGE | SATKHIRA | Non Govt. | 119108 | SHUVASHINI |
| 260 | HAZI NASIRUDDIN COLLEGE | SATKHIRA | Non Govt. | 118727 | SALIMPUR, KALAROA |
| 261 | SONAR BANGLA COLLEGE | SATKHIRA | Non Govt. | 118731 | SONABARIA, KALAROA |
| 262 | SHAHEED ZIAUR RAHMAN DEGREE COLLEGE | SATKHIRA | Non Govt. | 119109 | TIKARAMPUR |
| 263 | BEGUM KHALEDA ZIA COLLEGE | SATKHIRA | Non Govt. | 118733 | DHANDIA |
| 264 | BOALIA MUKTIJODDAH COLLEGE | SATKHIRA | Non Govt. | 132052 | BOALIA, Kalaroa |
| 265 | DRM UNITED IDEAL COLLEGE | SATKHIRA | Non Govt. | 118796 | Kaliganj, Satkhira |
| 266 | SUNDARBAN COLLEGE OF TECHNOLOGY | SATKHIRA | Non Govt. | | Satkhira |
| 267 | COLLEGE OF EDUCATION | SATKHIRA | Non Govt. | | SATKHIRA SADAR |
| 268 | CHANDANPUR UNITED COLLEGE | SATKHIRA | Non Govt. | 118732 | SATKHIRA |

== Barishal Region ==
| College Code | College Name | District | College Type | EIIN | Address |
|---|---|---|---|---|---|
| 1601 | BARGUNA GOVT. COLLEGE | BARGUNA | Govt. | 100241 | BARGUNA |
| 1602 | SYED FAZLUL HAQUE DEGREE COLLEGE | BARGUNA | Non Govt. | 100344 | LEMUA, PATHARGHATA |
| 1603 | BARGUNA GOVT. MAHILA COLLEGE | BARGUNA | Govt. | 100242 | MAHILA COLLEGE ROAD |
| 1604 | BETAGI GOVT. DEGREE COLLEGE | BARGUNA | Govt. | 100296 | BETAGI POURASAVA |
| 1605 | GOVT. BAMNA COLLEGE | BARGUNA | Govt. | 100143 | SAFIPUR |
| 1606 | AMTALI GOVT. COLLEGE | BARGUNA | Govt. | 100112 | AMTALI, BARGUNA |
| 1607 | TALTALI DEGREE COLLEGE | BARGUNA | Govt. | 100110 | TALITALI |
| 1608 | BEGUM FAIZUNNESSA MOHILA DEGREE COLLEGE | BARGUNA | Non Govt. | 100142 | KALAGASIA, BAMNA |
| 1609 | LALMIA TEACHERS' TRAINING COLLEGE | BARGUNA | Non Govt. | 133845 | College Road, Bagura Sadar |
| 1610 | EUNUS ALI KHAN COLLEGE | BARGUNA | Non Govt. | 100111 | KALIBARI |
| 1611 | PATHARGHATA COLLEGE | BARGUNA | Non Govt. | 100346 | PATHARGHATA CITY CORPORATION |
| 1612 | H. S. S. LAW COLLEGE | BARGUNA | Non Govt. | | Sadar, Barguna |
| 1613 | HALTA DAWATALA WAZED ALI KHAN COLLEGE | BARGUNA | Non Govt. | 100141 | HALTA, |
| 1614 | BAKULNESSA MOHILA DEGREE COLLEGE | BARGUNA | Non Govt. | 100113 | AMTALI |
| 1615 | GOVT. HAZI JALAL UDDIN MOHILA COLLEGE | BARGUNA | Govt. | 100345 | PATHARGHATA |
| 1616 | CHANDKHALI MOSHARROF HOSSAIN COLLEGE | BARGUNA | Non Govt. | 100295 | BARGUNA |
| 1101 | GOVT. B. M. COLLEGE | BARISAL | Govt. | 100875 | BARISAL SADAR |
| 1102 | AMRITLAL DEY COLLEGE | BARISAL | Non Govt. | 100874 | AMRITA LAL DEY SARAK |
| 1103 | SYED BAZLUL HAQUE COLLEGE | BARISAL | Non Govt. | 100659 | BAISARI, BANARIPARA |
| 1104 | HAJI TAHERUDDIN ISLAMIA COLLEGE | BARISAL | Non Govt. | 101102 | BHABANIPUR, WAZIRPUR |
| 1105 | BARISAL CITY COLLEGE | BARISAL | Non Govt. | 100870 | SADAR ROAD |
| 1106 | ISLAMIA COLLEGE | BARISAL | Non Govt. | 100868 | AMANATGONJ |
| 1107 | BARISAL GOVT. MAHILA COLLEGE | BARISAL | Govt. | 100877 | AGARPUR ROAD |
| 1108 | BEGUM TOFAZZAL HOSSAIN MANIK MIAH MAHILA COLLEGE | BARISAL | Non Govt. | 100873 | SOUTH ALEKANDA |
| 1109 | BARISAL GOVT. COLLEGE | BARISAL | Govt. | 100867 | KALIBARI ROAD |
| 1110 | GOVT. SYED HATEM ALI COLLEGE | BARISAL | Govt. | 100876 | Barisal |
| 1111 | GOVT. BAKERGONJ COLLEGE | BARISAL | Govt. | 100591 | SAHEBGONJ |
| 1112 | SYED AFSAR ALI COLLEGE | BARISAL | Non Govt. | 100589 | MOHESHPUR |
| 1113 | GOURNADI GOVT. COLLEGE | BARISAL | Govt. | 100703 | GOURNADI, BARISAL |
| 1114 | GOVT. PATARHAT ROSHIC CHANDRA COLLEGE | BARISAL | Govt. | 100949 | MAHENDIGONJ |
| 1115 | FUZLUL HUQ GOVT. COLLEGE | BARISAL | Govt. | 101710 | CHAKHAR |
| 1116 | BANARIPARA COLLEGE | BARISAL | Non Govt. | 100657 | BANARIPARA |
| 1117 | ABUL KALAM COLLEGE, RAKUDIA | BARISAL | Govt. | 100442 | BABUGONJ |
| 1118 | KALASHKATHI COLLEGE | BARISAL | Non Govt. | 100590 | KALASKATHI, BAKERGONJ |
| 1119 | HAZRAT ALI COLLEGE | BARISAL | Non Govt. | 100592 | KAMAR KHALI |
| 1120 | MULADI GOVT. COLLEGE | BARISAL | Govt. | 101013 | MULADI, BARISAL |
| 1121 | GOVT. HIZLA COLLEGE | BARISAL | Govt. | 100736 | |
| 1122 | GOVT. SHAHEED ABDUR ROB SERNIABAT DEGREE COLLEGE | BARISAL | Govt. | 100382 | AGAILJHARA |
| 1123 | UJIRPUR AL HAJ B. N. KHAN COLLEGE | BARISAL | Non Govt. | 101099 | UJIRPUR |
| 1124 | DHAMURA COLLEGE | BARISAL | Non Govt. | 101098 | DHAMURA |
| 1125 | GOVT. SHER-E-BANGLA DEGREE COLLEGE, SHIKARPUR | BARISAL | Govt. | 101101 | SHIKERPUR, WAZIRPUR |
| 1126 | BABUGANJ DEGREE COLLEGE, BABUGANJ | BARISAL | Non Govt. | 100441 | BABUGANJ |
| 1127 | AGARPUR COLLEGE | BARISAL | Non Govt. | 100440 | AGARPUR, BABUGONJ |
| 1128 | SHAHID ZIAUR RAHMAN COLLEGE | BARISAL | Non Govt. | 100878 | SHAHEBERHAT |
| 1129 | NAZIRPUR UNITED COLLEGE | BARISAL | Non Govt. | 101015 | NAZIRPUR |
| 1130 | CHARKALEKHAN ADARSHA COLLEGE | BARISAL | Non Govt. | 101014 | CHARKALEKHAN |
| 1131 | ULANIA MUZAFFAR KHAN COLLEGE | BARISAL | Non Govt. | 100951 | MAHENDIGONJ |
| 1132 | C. N. B. COLLEGE | BARISAL | Non Govt. | 100593 | NIAMATI |
| 1133 | MAHILARA COLLEGE | BARISAL | Non Govt. | 100706 | MAHILARA, GOURNADI |
| 1134 | SHAHID SMARANIKA DEGREE COLLEGE | BARISAL | Non Govt. | 101095 | MUNSIR TALLUK |
| 1135 | BARAKOTHA UNION DEGREE COLLEGE | BARISAL | Non Govt. | 101104 | CHOWDHURIR HAT |
| 1136 | GUTHIA IDEAL COLLEGE | BARISAL | Non Govt. | 101096 | GUTHIA |
| 1137 | SHAHID ABDUR RAB SERNIABAT LAW COLLEGE | BARISAL | Non Govt. | | HOSPITAL ROAD |
| 1138 | BEGUM SAMSUDDIN TALUKDER COLLEGE | BARISAL | Non Govt. | 100596 | CHARADI, RANIRHAT, BAKERGONJ |
| 1139 | COLLEGE OF EDUCATION (B. ED.) | BARISAL | Non Govt. | | barisal-sadar |
| 1140 | GOVT. SHAHID ABDUR ROUB SERNIABAD TEACHERS' TRAINING COLLEGE | BARISAL | Govt. | | kashipur, p. s-barisal sadar |
| 1141 | COLLEGE OF EDUCATION (B. P. ED.) | BARISAL | Non Govt. | | UTTAR AMANATGANJ |
| 1142 | INSTITUTE OF LIBRARY AND INFORMATION SCIENCE | BARISAL | Non Govt. | | SOUTH ALEKANDA BARISAL |
| 1143 | SYED AZIZUL HAQUE COLLEGE | BARISAL | Non Govt. | 101097 | KESABKATI |
| 1144 | BARISAL INSTITUTE OF INFORMATION TECHNOLOGY (BIIT) | BARISAL | Non Govt. | | B ROAD BARISAL |
| 1145 | HELALUDDIN AHMMOD COLLEGE | BARISAL | Non Govt. | 100594 | KAKARDHA |
| 1146 | MAHENDIGONJ MOHILA MOHABIDHALAY | BARISAL | Non Govt. | 100948 | MEHENDIGONJ |
| 1147 | BARTHI DEGREE COLLEGE | BARISAL | Non Govt. | 100705 | BARTHI |
| 1148 | M. A. MALEK DEGREE COLLEGE | BARISAL | Non Govt. | 100595 | CHHOTO RAGHUNATHPUR |
| 1149 | GOVT. PHYSICAL EDUCATION COLLEGE | BARISAL | Govt. | | Sadar, barisal |
| 1150 | BISHARKANDI SHER-E-BANGLA DEGREE COLLEGE | BARISAL | Non Govt. | 100656 | BISHARKANDI |
| 1151 | ARIF MAHMUD COLLEGE | BARISAL | Non Govt. | 101017 | CHARCOMISONAR |
| 1152 | ATAHAR UDDIN HOWLADER DEGREE COLLEGE | BARISAL | Non Govt. | 100588 | BALAYKATHI, BADALPARA |
| 1153 | UJIRPUR MOHILA COLLEGE | BARISAL | Non Govt. | 101100 | UJIRPUR |
| 1154 | AKOTA DEGREE COLLEGE | BARISAL | Non Govt. | 100950 | SONTOSHPUR |
| 1155 | NIZAMUDDIN DEGREE COLLEGE | BARISAL | Non Govt. | 100704 | HOSNABAD |
| 1156 | BARISAL INFORMATION TECHNOLOGY COLLEGE (BITC) | BARISAL | Non Govt. | 137735 | NABOGRAM ROAD |
| 1157 | KABAI UNION ISLAMIA COLLEGE | BARISAL | Non Govt. | 100598 | POST: LUXMIPASHA |
| 1158 | HAZI SYED BODRUL HOSSAIN COLLEGE | BARISAL | Non Govt. | 101018 | Sapipur, Muladi |
| 1159 | ABDUR RAB SERNIABAT GOVT. COLLEGE | BARISAL | Govt. | 100869 | |
| 1160 | PURBO HOSNABAD MOHABIDDALAYA | BARISAL | Non Govt. | 101016 | GACHHUA, MULADI |
| 1401 | BHOLA GOVT. COLLEGE | BHOLA | Govt. | 101205 | BHOLA SADAR |
| 1402 | NAZIUR RAHMAN COLLEGE | BHOLA | Non Govt. | 101208 | PARANGONJ |
| 1403 | TAZUMUDDIN GOVT. COLLEGE | BHOLA | Govt. | 101621 | HATSHOSHIGONG |
| 1404 | GOVT. SHEIKH FAZILATUNNESA MOHILA COLLEGE | BHOLA | Govt. | 101207 | GAZIPUR ROAD |
| 1405 | DAULATKHAN GOVT. ABU ABDULLAH COLLEGE | BHOLA | Govt. | 101486 | DAULATKHAN POUROSOVA |
| 1406 | GOVT. ABDUL JABBAR COLLEGE | BHOLA | Govt. | 101294 | BORHANUDDIN |
| 1407 | CHARFASSION GOVT. COLLEGE | BHOLA | Govt. | 101439 | CHARFASSON POURASHAVA |
| 1408 | KORIMUNNESSA HAFIZ MOHILA COLLEGE | BHOLA | Non Govt. | 101570 | LALMOHAN municipality |
| 1409 | SHAHBAJPUR GOVT. COLLEGE | BHOLA | Govt. | 101572 | COLLEGE PARA |
| 1410 | FATEMA MATIN MOHILA COLLEGE | BHOLA | Non Govt. | 101438 | CHARFASSION |
| 1411 | DULAR HAT ADARSHA COLLEGE | BHOLA | Non Govt. | 101440 | CHARTOFAZZOL, DULARHAT |
| 1412 | ALTAZER RAHMAN COLLEGE | BHOLA | Non Govt. | 101209 | |
| 1413 | BORHANUDDIN MAHILA COLLEGE | BHOLA | Non Govt. | 101292 | BORHANUDDIN |
| 1414 | MANPURA GOVT. COLLEGE | BHOLA | Govt. | 101591 | MONPURA, BHOLA |
| 1415 | DR. AZAHAR UDDIN DEGREE COLLEGE | BHOLA | Non Govt. | 101573 | GAZARIA, LALMOHAN |
| 1416 | RASULPUR DEGREE COLLEGE | BHOLA | Non Govt. | 101435 | SHASHIBHUSSION |
| 1417 | BANKERHAT CO-OPERATIVE COLLEGE | BHOLA | Non Govt. | 101210 | BANKERHAT |
| 1418 | ELISHA ISLAMIA MODEL COLLEGE | BHOLA | Non Govt. | 101203 | BHOLA SADAR |
| 1419 | BANGLA BAZAR FATEMA KHANAM COLLEGE | BHOLA | Non Govt. | 101204 | SOUTH DIGHOLDI |
| 1420 | BHOLA ADAKHA NAZRUL ISLAM TEACHER'S TRAINING COLLEGE | BHOLA | Non Govt. | | Charfasion |
| 1421 | HALIMA KHATUN MOHILA MOHABIDHALAYA | BHOLA | Non Govt. | 101485 | JOYNAGAR |
| 1422 | DHALIGOURNAGAR COLLEGE | BHOLA | Non Govt. | 132034 | KULCHARA, SHARAJIA |
| 1423 | REBA RAHMAN DEGREE COLLEGE | BHOLA | Non Govt. | 132025 | Bhola, Chittagong |
| 1424 | ZANATA BAZAR COLLEGE | BHOLA | Non Govt. | 101434 | CHAR FASSON |
| 1425 | BEGUM RAHIMA ISLAM COLLEGE | BHOLA | Non Govt. | 134388 | Charfasson |
| 1426 | ABDULLAH AL ISLAM JAKOB COLLEGE | BHOLA | Non Govt. | 101437 | Hasangonj |
| 1427 | PRINCIPAL NAZRUL ISLAM COLLEGE | BHOLA | Non Govt. | 134352 | Charfassion |
| 1428 | NILIMA JAKOB COLLEGE | BHOLA | Non Govt. | 136974 | BHOLA |
| 1429 | KACHIA TOBGI EASIN PARA E.P MOHABIDHALAY | BHOLA | Non Govt. | 101293 | |
| 1430 | HAZI MD NURUL ISLAM CHOWDHURY COLLEGE | BHOLA | Non Govt. | 135393 | BHOLA |
| 1431 | DOKKHIN AICHA PRINCIPAL NAZRUL ISLAM COLLEGE | BHOLA | Non Govt. | 139117 | CHAR FASSON |
| 1301 | JHALOKATHI GOVT. COLLEGE | JHALOKATHI | Govt. | 101709 | JHALOKATHI |
| 1302 | SHERE BANGLA FAZLUL HAQUE COLLEGE | JHALOKATHI | Non Govt. | 101710 | BINOYKATI |
| 1303 | GOVT. NOLCHHITI COLLEGE | JHALOKATHI | Govt. | 101867 | NALCHITY |
| 1304 | ZULFIKAR ALI BHUTTO COLLEGE | JHALOKATHI | Non Govt. | 101868 | KATAKHALI |
| 1305 | GOVT. TOFAZZAL HOSSAIN MANIK MIA COLLEGE | JHALOKATHI | Govt. | 101783 | KATHALIA |
| 1306 | SHAHID RAJA COLLEGE | JHALOKATHI | Non Govt. | 101784 | AMUA |
| 1307 | JHALOKATHI MOHILA COLLEGE | JHALOKATHI | Govt. | 101708 | JHALOKATI |
| 1308 | ALHAJ LALMON HAMID WOMEN COLLEGE | JHALOKATHI | Non Govt. | 101972 | RAJAPUR |
| 1309 | RAJAPUR GOVT. COLLEGE | JHALOKATHI | Govt. | 101973 | RAJAPUR, JHALAKATI |
| 1311 | DOPDOPIA UNIOUN DEGREE COLLEGE | JHALOKATHI | Non Govt. | 101869 | BHAROTKATI |
| 1312 | BARAIYA COLLEGE | JHALOKATHI | Non Govt. | 101975 | PALOT |
| 1313 | MONOSWITA MOHILA COLLEGE | JHALOKATHI | Non Govt. | 101785 | Talgasia |
| 1314 | ABDUL MALEQUE COLLEGE | JHALOKATHI | Non Govt. | 101974 | Uttampur, Rajapur |
| 1315 | AKLIMA MOAZZEM HOSSAIN COLLEGE | JHALOKATHI | Non Govt. | 136555 | JHALOKATHI SADAR |
| 1316 | HEMAYET UDDIN COLLEGE, GUATON | JHALOKATHI | Non Govt. | 101707 | Guaton |
| 1501 | PATUAKHALI GOVT. COLLEGE | PATUAKHALI | Govt. | 102596 | PATUAKHALI. |
| 1502 | PATUAKHALI MAHILA COLLEGE | PATUAKHALI | Govt. | 102593 | |
| 1503 | MAUKARAN BADARPUR LEBUKHALI PANGASHIA COLLEGE | PATUAKHALI | Non Govt. | 102598 | MOUKARON, MOUKARON |
| 1504 | GOVT. JANATA COLLEGE | PATUAKHALI | Govt. | 102216 | DUMKI, PATUAKHALI |
| 1505 | IDRIS MOLLAH DEGREE COLLEGE | PATUAKHALI | Non Govt. | 102105 | KALIYA |
| 1506 | ABDUL KARIM MRIDHA COLLEGE | PATUAKHALI | Non Govt. | 102594 | CHARPARA, PATUAKHALI |
| 1507 | GALACHIPA GOVT. COLLEGE | PATUAKHALI | Govt. | 102331 | GALACHIPA |
| 1508 | GOVT. MOZAHARUDDIN BISWAS COLLEGE | PATUAKHALI | Govt. | 102402 | KHEPUPARA, PATUAKHALI |
| 1509 | SUBIDKHALI GOVT. COLLEGE | PATUAKHALI | Govt. | 102471 | SUBIDKHALI |
| 1510 | BAUPHAL GOVT. COLLEGE | PATUAKHALI | Govt. | 102107 | BAUPHAL, BAUPHAL |
| 1511 | DR. YAKUB SHARIF COLLEGE | PATUAKHALI | Non Govt. | 102110 | BAGA BANDOR, BAUPHAL |
| 1512 | KOLAGACHIA S. M. SAKENDAR ALI CHOWDHURY DEGREE COLLEGE | PATUAKHALI | Non Govt. | 102330 | KALAGACHIA, KALAGACHIA. |
| 1513 | KALISURI COLLEGE | PATUAKHALI | Non Govt. | 102109 | KALISURI, BAUPHAL |
| 1514 | KACHIPARA MD. ABDUR RASHID MIAH COLLEGE | PATUAKHALI | Non Govt. | 102113 | KACHIPARA |
| 1515 | GALACHIPA WOMEN'S COLLEGE | PATUAKHALI | Non Govt. | 102332 | GALACHIPA |
| 1516 | AKHTAR HOSSAIN CHOUDHURY MEMORIAL COLLEGE | PATUAKHALI | Non Govt. | 102473 | KATHALTOLI |
| 1517 | PATUAKHALI LAW COLLEGE | PATUAKHALI | Non Govt. | | Adalatpara |
| 1519 | DAKSHINBANGA TEACHERS' TRAINING COLLEGE | PATUAKHALI | Non Govt. | | Shere-e-bangla road |
| 1521 | PATUAKHALI PHYSICAL TRAINING COLLEGE | PATUAKHALI | Non Govt. | | Sher-e-Bangla Road |
| 1522 | MOHAMMED ISHAQUE MODEL DEGREE COLLEGE | PATUAKHALI | Non Govt. | 102595 | PATUAKHALI |
| 1523 | GOVT. ABDUR RASHID TALUKDER COLLEGE | PATUAKHALI | Govt. | 102164 | |
| 1524 | DHANKHALI COLLEGE | PATUAKHALI | Non Govt. | 102403 | |
| 1525 | SUBIDKHALI MOHILA COLLEGE | PATUAKHALI | Non Govt. | 102472 | SUBIDKHALI |
| 1526 | ABDUR RASHID KHAN COLLEGE | PATUAKHALI | Non Govt. | 102112 | NOWMALA |
| 1527 | HAZI MOKTER ALI MRIDHA DEGREE COLLEGE | PATUAKHALI | Non Govt. | 102600 | CHHOTO BEGHAI |
| 1528 | ENGINEER FARUK TALUKDER MOHILLA COLLEGE | PATUAKHALI | Non Govt. | 102108 | NAZIRPUR |
| 1529 | DHARANDI COLLEGE | PATUAKHALI | Non Govt. | 102591 | DHARANDI |
| 1530 | KHARIZZAMA COLLEGE | PATUAKHALI | Non Govt. | 102334 | KHARIZZAMA |
| 1531 | AZIZ AHMED COLLEGE | PATUAKHALI | Non Govt. | 131891 | MURADIA, DUMKI |
| 1532 | PATUAKHALI LIBRARY AND INFORMATION SCIENCE COLLEGE | PATUAKHALI | Non Govt. | | SHER-E-BANGLA ROAD |
| 1533 | KALAPARA MOHILLA COLLEGE | PATUAKHALI | Non Govt. | 102401 | Kalapara, Patuakhali |
| 1534 | KESHABPUR MAHAVIDYALA | PATUAKHALI | Non Govt. | 102106 | BAUPHAL |
| 1535 | KUAKATA KHANABAD COLLEGE | PATUAKHALI | Non Govt. | 102399 | KALA PARA |
| 1536 | HAZI AKKEL ALI HOWLADER DEGREE COLLEGE | PATUAKHALI | Non Govt. | 102597 | |
| 1537 | MUKTIJHODDHA MEMORIAL COLLEGE | PATUAKHALI | Non Govt. | 102400 | |
| 1538 | HAZI HAMEJUDDIN MRIDHA DEGREE COLLEGE | PATUAKHALI | Non Govt. | 132000 | PATUAKHALI SADAR |
| 1539 | ALHAZ JALAL UDDIN COLLEGE | PATUAKHALI | Non Govt. | 102404 | PATUAKHALI |
| 1540 | HAZI KERAMAT ALI DEGREE COLLEGE | PATUAKHALI | Non Govt. | 102327 | PATUAKHALI |
| 1201 | SUHRAWARDI GOVT. COLLEGE | PEROJPUR | Govt. | 102955 | PIROJPUR SADAR |
| 1202 | PEROJPUR GOVT. MAHILA COLLEGE | PEROJPUR | Govt. | 102956 | PARERHAT ROAD |
| 1203 | GOVT. KAUKHALI COLLEGE | PEROJPUR | Govt. | 102721 | KAUKHALI |
| 1205 | BHANDARIA GOVT. COLLEGE | PEROJPUR | Govt. | 102683 | BHANDARIA |
| 1207 | BHANDARIA MAJIDA BEGUM MAHILA COLLEGE | PEROJPUR | Non Govt. | 102684 | BHANDARIA |
| 1208 | GOVT. SWARUPKATHI COLLEGE | PEROJPUR | Govt. | 103082 | SOHAGDAL, NESARABAD |
| 1209 | NAZIRPUR COLLEGE | PEROJPUR | Non Govt. | 102892 | NAZIRPUR SADOR |
| 1210 | MATIBHANGA DEGREE COLLEGE | PEROJPUR | Non Govt. | 102889 | MATIBHANGA, NAZIRPUR |
| 1211 | MOTHBARIA GOVT. COLLEGE | PEROJPUR | Govt. | 102819 | MATHBARIA |
| 1212 | KABI GURU RABINDRA NATH DEGREE COLLEGE | PEROJPUR | Non Govt. | 103083 | KURIANA |
| 1213 | GOVT. INDURKANI COLLEGE | PEROJPUR | Govt. | 102986 | ZIANAGAR, PIROJPUR |
| 1214 | SAFA COLLEGE | PEROJPUR | Non Govt. | 102821 | DHANISAFA, SAFA BANDAR |
| 1215 | AFTABUDDIN COLLEGE | PEROJPUR | Non Govt. | 102954 | PIROJPUR SADAR |
| 1216 | SHAHID SMRITI COLLEGE | PEROJPUR | Non Govt. | 103081 | SWARUPKATI |
| 1217 | MOHIUDDIN AHMED WOMEN'S DEGREE COLLEGE | PEROJPUR | Non Govt. | 102817 | MATHBARIA POUROSAVA |
| 1218 | RAJBARI COLLEGE | PEROJPUR | Non Govt. | 103078 | BYASKATI |
| 1219 | MOTHBARIA TEACHERS' TRAINING COLLEGE | PEROJPUR | Non Govt. | | mothbaria, perojpur |
| 1220 | DR. RUSTUM ALI FARAJI DEGREE COLLEGE | PEROJPUR | Non Govt. | 102820 | UTTAR SONAKHALI |
| 1221 | PEROJPUR LAW COLLEGE | PEROJPUR | Non Govt. | 133506 | sadar road, perojpur |
| 1223 | PEROJPUR TEACHERS' TRAINING COLLEGE | PEROJPUR | Non Govt. | | Perojpur Sadar |
| 1224 | AMANULLAH DEGREE COLLEGE | PEROJPUR | Non Govt. | 102682 | BHANDARIA, PIROJPUR |
| 1225 | FAZILA RAHMAN MOHILA COLLEGE | PEROJPUR | Non Govt. | 103080 | KOWRIKHARA |
| 1226 | PASHCIM SOHAGDAL SHAHID SMRITY B. M. DEGREE COLLEGE | PEROJPUR | Non Govt. | 131984 | WEST SOHAGDAL |
| 1227 | KAUKHALI MOHILA DEGREE COLLEGE | PEROJPUR | Non Govt. | 102720 | KAUKHALI |
| 1228 | GOVT. BANGAMATA BEGUM FAZILATUNNESA MUJIB WOMEN'S COLLEGE | PEROJPUR | Govt. | 134874 | NAZIRPUR SADAR |
| 1229 | ALHAJ ABDUR RAHMAN COLLEGE | PEROJPUR | Non Govt. | 103079 | NESARABAD |
| 1230 | BANGABANDHU SHEIKH MUJIBUR RAHMAN COLLEGE | PEROJPUR | Non Govt. | 131952 | PEROJPUR |
| 1231 | BAITHA KATA COLLEGE | PEROJPUR | Non Govt. | 102890 | PEROJPUR |

== Sylhet Region ==
| College Code | College Name | District | College Type | EIIN | Address |
|---|---|---|---|---|---|
| 1801 | BRINDABAN GOVT. COLLEGE | HABIGANJ | Govt. | 129447 | HABIGANJ |
| 1802 | CHUNARUGHAT GOVT. COLLEGE | HABIGANJ | Govt. | 129412 | CHUNARUGHAT SHOWDHUR |
| 1803 | SAISTAGANJ DEGREE COLLEGE | HABIGANJ | N | 129448 | SAISTAGANJ |
| 1804 | JANAB ALI GOVT. COLLEGE | HABIGANJ | Govt. | 129372 | JATRAPASHA. BANIACHONG |
| 1805 | MOULANA ASAD ALI DEGREE COLLEGE | HABIGANJ | Non Govt. | 129493 | MADHABPUR |
| 1806 | HABIGANJ MAHILA COLLEGE | HABIGANJ | Govt. | 129449 | RAJNAGOR, HABIGANJ |
| 1807 | NABIGANJ DEGREE COLLEGE | HABIGANJ | Govt. | 129524 | NABIGANJ |
| 1808 | INATHGANJ COLLEGE | HABIGANJ | Non Govt. | 129525 | INATHGANJ BAZAR |
| 1809 | ALIF SUBHAN CHOWDHURY GOVT. COLLEGE | HABIGANJ | Govt. | 129342 | MIRPUR BAZAR |
| 1810 | SHACHINDRA COLLEGE, NAGURA | HABIGANJ | Non Govt. | 129373 | NAGURA, P.O-PUKHRA |
| 1811 | SHAHJALAL GOVT. COLLEGE | HABIGANJ | Govt. | 129492 | AFZAL PUR |
| 1812 | AJMIRIGANJ DEGREE COLLEGE | HABIGANJ | Govt. | 129325 | P.O- AJMIRIGANJ |
| 1813 | HABIGANJ LAW COLLEGE | HABIGANJ | Non Govt. | | SHASHANGHAT ROAD |
| 1814 | BAHUBAL COLLEGE | HABIGANJ | Non Govt. | 129343 | BAHUBAL |
| 1815 | SUFIA MATIN MOHILA COLLEGE | HABIGANJ | Non Govt. | 129374 | JATRAPASHA |
| 1816 | DHARMAGHAR COLLEGE | HABIGANJ | Non Govt. | 129494 | DHARMAGHAR |
| 1817 | MUKTIJODDHA ZIA COLLEGE | HABIGANJ | Govt. | 129462 | bamai, lakhai |
| 1818 | RAGIB RABEYA COLLEGE | HABIGANJ | Non Govt. | 139971 | paniumda, nabigonj |
| 1819 | DINARPUR COLLEGE | HABIGANJ | Non Govt. | 136281 | DEOPARA, NABIGANG |
| 2001 | MOULVIBAZAR GOVT. COLLEGE | MOULVIBAZAR | Govt. | 129730 | COUT ROAD, MOULVIBAZAR |
| 2002 | BARALEKHA DEGREE COLLEGE | MOULVIBAZAR | Govt. | 129580 | GRAMTALA, BARLEKHA |
| 2003 | MOULVIBAZAR MAHILA COLLEGE | MOULVIBAZAR | Govt. | 129729 | COURT ROAD, MOULVIBAZAR |
| 2004 | RAJNAGAR GOVERNMENT COLLEGE | MOULVIBAZAR | Govt. | 129755 | RAJNAGAR |
| 2005 | KOMOLGANJ GOVT. GANO COLLEGE | MOULVIBAZAR | Govt. | | KOMOLGANJ |
| 2006 | SREEMANGAL GOVT. COLLEGE | MOULVIBAZAR | Govt. | 129783 | SREEMANGAL |
| 2007 | KULAURA DEGREE COLLEGE | MOULVIBAZAR | Govt. | 129682 | KULAURA |
| 2008 | TAIBUNNESSA KHANOM ACADEMY DEGREE COLLEGE | MOULVIBAZAR | Govt. | 129582 | NORTH BABANIPUR |
| 2009 | YAKUB TAJUL MAHILA COLLEGE | MOULVIBAZAR | Non Govt. | 129681 | KULAURA |
| 2010 | DWARIKA PAUL MOHILA COLLEGE, SRIMANGAL | MOULVIBAZAR | Non Govt. | 129782 | HOBIGANJ ROAD, SRIMANGAL |
| 2011 | NARI SHIKKA ACADEMY DEGREE COLLEGE | MOULVIBAZAR | Non Govt. | 129581 | PANIDHAR, BARLEKHA |
| 2012 | LUNGLA ADHUNIK DEGREE COLLEGE | MOULVIBAZAR | Non Govt. | 129684 | PO.- PRITHIMPASSA |
| 2013 | MOULANA MOFAZZAL HOSSAIN MAHILA COLLEGE | MOULVIBAZAR | Non Govt. | 129756 | PONCHGON |
| 2014 | SYED SHAH MOSTAFA COLLEGE | MOULVIBAZAR | Non Govt. | 129731 | SHAMSHER NAGAR ROAD |
| 2015 | ALHAJ MD MOKLISUR RAHMAN DEGREE COLLEGE | MOULVIBAZAR | Non Govt. | 135327 | MOULVIBAZAR sadar |
| 2016 | SHAH- NIMATRA SAGORNAL- FULTOLA COLLEGE | MOULVIBAZAR | Non Govt. | 129680 | Juri |
| 2017 | BHATERA COLLEGE | MOULVIBAZAR | Non Govt. | 139253 | KURAURA |
| 1901 | SUNAMGANJ GOVT. COLLEGE | SUNAMGANJ | Govt. | 130051 | HASANNAGOR |
| 1902 | JAMALGANJ GOVT. COLLEGE | SUNAMGANJ | Govt. | 129996 | SACHNA |
| 1903 | DERAI GOVT. COLLEGE | SUNAMGANJ | Govt. | 129887 | DERAICHANDPUR |
| 1904 | CHHATAK MAHABIDDYALAYA | SUNAMGANJ | Govt. | 129855 | CHHATAK |
| 1905 | GOBINDOGANJ ABDUL HAQUE SMRITI COLLEGE | SUNAMGANJ | Non Govt. | 129856 | GOBINDAGANJ NAYA BAZAR |
| 1906 | DIGENDRA BARMAN DEGREE COLLEGE | SUNAMGANJ | Govt. | 129802 | SOGHOR, BISWAMBHARPUR |
| 1907 | DHARMA PASHA GOVT. COLLEGE | SUNAMGANJ | Govt. | 129908 | DHAMAPASHA, SUNAMGONJ |
| 1908 | BADSHAGANJ COLLEGE | SUNAMGANJ | Non Govt. | 129909 | BADSHAGANJ |
| 1909 | JAGANNATHPUR DEGREE COLLEGE | SUNAMGANJ | Govt. | 129978 | JAGANNATHPUR |
| 1910 | JAWA BAZAR COLLEGE | SUNAMGANJ | Non Govt. | 129858 | JAWA BAZAR, CHHATAK |
| 1911 | JANATA COLLEGE | SUNAMGANJ | Non Govt. | 129857 | VILL. PO: MOYEENPUR |
| 1912 | BADAGHAT GOVT. COLLEGE | SUNAMGANJ | Govt. | 130077 | MOLLA PARA, BADAGHAT BAZAR |
| 1913 | SUNAMGANJ GOVT. WOMENS COLLEGE | SUNAMGANJ | Govt. | 130050 | BADANPARA, SUNAMGANJ |
| 1914 | DUARABAZAR DEGREE COLLEGE | SUNAMGANJ | Govt. | 129932 | DUARABAZAR, SUNAMGANJ |
| 1915 | BIBIANA MODEL COLLEGE | SUNAMGANJ | Non Govt. | 129886 | BOALIA BAZAR |
| 1916 | ISLAMGONJ COLLEGE | SUNAMGANJ | Non Govt. | 130053 | Gourarong, Sunamgong |
| 1917 | SULLA GOVT. COLLEGE | SUNAMGANJ | Govt. | 130010 | GHUNGERGHOAN |
| 1918 | MOINUL HAQUE COLLEGE | SUNAMGANJ | Non Govt. | 130055 | JOYNOGOR BAZAR |
| 1919 | SUNAMGANJ POURA COLLEGE | SUNAMGANJ | Non Govt. | 130052 | SUNAMGANJ SADAR |
| 1920 | JOYNEL ABEDIN COLLEGE | SUNAMGANJ | Non Govt. | 130078 | TAHIRPUR |
| 1701 | M. C. COLLEGE | SYLHET | Govt. | 130457 | TILAGAR, SYLHET |
| 1702 | HAZRAT SHAHJALAL (RA.) COLLEGE | SYLHET | Non Govt. | 130355 | KOHAIGOR, CHIKNAGOOL |
| 1703 | TAJPUR COLLEGE | SYLHET | Non Govt. | 130125 | TAJPUR |
| 1704 | BHADESWAR MAHILA COLLEGE | SYLHET | Non Govt. | 130299 | SOUTH BHADESWAR |
| 1705 | GOVT. MAHILA COLLEGE | SYLHET | Govt. | 130453 | CHOWHATTA, SADAR |
| 1706 | MOINUDDIN ADARSHA MAHILA COLLEGE | SYLHET | Non Govt. | 130451 | SHAMIMABAD, BAGBARI |
| 1707 | SYLHET GOVT. COLLEGE | SYLHET | Govt. | 130450 | TAMABIL ROAD, TILAGOAR |
| 1708 | GOVT. MADAN MOHAN COLLEGE | SYLHET | Govt. | 130452 | LAMABAZAR |
| 1709 | BEANIBAZAR GOVT. COLLEGE | SYLHET | Govt. | 130172 | BEANIBAZAR |
| 1710 | FENCHUGANJ DEGREE COLLEGE | SYLHET | Govt. | 130257 | P.O. FENCHUGANJ |
| 1711 | DHAKA DAKSHIN DEGREE COLLEGE | SYLHET | Govt. | 130300 | DHAKA DAKSHIN, GOLAPGONJ |
| 1712 | GOAIN GHAT DEGREE COLLEGE | SYLHET | Govt. | 130335 | GOWAINGHAT, SYLHET |
| 1713 | KANAI GHAT GOVT. COLLEGE | SYLHET | Govt. | 130389 | KANAIGHAT |
| 1714 | DAKSHIN SURMA GOVERNMENT COLLEGE | SYLHET | Govt. | 130499 | DAKSHIN SURMA |
| 1715 | RAGIB-RABEYA COLLEGE | SYLHET | Non Govt. | 130219 | RAGIB NAGOR, KAMAL BAZAR |
| 1716 | JAINTAPUR TAYOB ALI DEGREE COLLEGE | SYLHET | Non Govt. | 130356 | JAINTAPUR, SYLHET |
| 1717 | BALAGONJ GOVERNMENT COLLEGE | SYLHET | Govt. | 130124 | BALAGONJ, SYLHET |
| 1719 | SYLHET LAW COLLEGE | SYLHET | Non Govt. | 133339 | SHAHJALAL BRIDGE ROAD |
| 1720 | JALALABAD TEACHERS' TRAINING COLLEGE, UPASHAHAR | SYLHET | Non Govt. | 133271 | SHAHJALAL UPOSHAHAR |
| 1721 | METROPOLITAN LAW COLLEGE | SYLHET | Non Govt. | | 29 diginto, Amborkhana |
| 1722 | GOVT. TEACHERS' TRAINING COLLEGE | SYLHET | Govt. | 133322 | PURBO SHAHI |
| 1723 | SHAH KHURROM COLLEGE | SYLHET | Non Govt. | 130455 | TUKER BAZAR |
| 1724 | JAINTIA DEGREE COLLEGE | SYLHET | Non Govt. | 130354 | DORBOST, JAINTAPUR |
| 1725 | NOORJAHAN MEMORIAL WOMEN'S COLLEGE | SYLHET | Non Govt. | 130456 | DAKSHIN SURMA, SYLHET. |
| 1726 | SHIMANTIK IDEAL TEACHERS' TRAINING COLLEGE | SYLHET | Non Govt. | 133393 | URMI 43 SHIBGONJ MAIN ROAD |
| 1727 | BEANIBAZAR ADARSHA MOHILA COLLEGE | SYLHET | Non Govt. | 130299 | NIDONPUR |
| 1728 | BISWANATH DEGREE COLLEGE | SYLHET | Govt. | 130217 | BISWANATH |
| 1729 | LATIFA-SHAFI CHOUDHURY WOMEN COLLEGE | SYLHET | Non Govt. | 130500 | P.O: KHALOMUK BAZAR |
| 1730 | ISAMOTI COLLEGE | SYLHET | Non Govt. | 130543 | ISAMOTI |
| 1732 | HAFSA MAZUMDER MOHILA DEGREE COLLEGE | SYLHET | Non Govt. | 130540 | ZAKIGANJ |
| 1733 | IMRAN AHMAD WOMEN'S DEGREE COLLEGE | SYLHET | Govt. | 130357 | NIJPAT (JANGAL HATI) |
| 1734 | GOALABAZAR ADARSHA GOVT. WOMEN'S COLLEGE | SYLHET | Govt. | 130123 | GOALABAZAR |
| 1735 | M. SAIFUR RAHMAN COLLEGE | SYLHET | Non Govt. | 130235 | COMPANIGONG |
| 1736 | JALALPUR COLLEGE | SYLHET | Non Govt. | 130449 | AJMOTPUR, JALALPUR |
| 1737 | DAYAMIR COLLEGE | SYLHET | Non Govt. | 130126 | Balaganj |
| 1738 | BAROHAL COLLEGE | SYLHET | Non Govt. | 130541 | Zakiganj, Sylhet |
| 1739 | AL-EMDAD COLLEGE | SYLHET | Non Govt. | 130305 | Golapganj, Sylhet |
| 1740 | GACHHBARI IDEAL COLLEGE | SYLHET | Non Govt. | 130390 | Kanaighat |
| 1741 | ZAASS INSTITUTE | SYLHET | Non Govt. | | |
| 1742 | BOIRAGIBAZAR IDEAL COLLEGE | SYLHET | Non Govt. | 134344 | Beanibazar, Sylhet |
| 1743 | KUSHIARA COLLEGE | SYLHET | Non Govt. | 130301 | Golapganj Upazila |
| 1744 | UTTAR BISHWANATH AMJOD ULLAH COLLEGE | SYLHET | Non Govt. | 130218 | Bishwanath, Sylhet |
| 1745 | ZAKIGONJ GOVT. COLLEGE | SYLHET | Govt. | 130542 | ZAKIGONJ |
| 1746 | MALIK NAHAR MEMORIAL COLLEGE | SYLHET | Non Govt. | 132030 | KANAIGHAT |
| 1747 | SHIMANTIK COLLEGE | SYLHET | Non Govt. | 134190 | SYLHET |

== Mymensingh Region ==
| College Code | College Name | District | College Type | EIIN | Address |
|---|---|---|---|---|---|
| 5001 | GOVT. ASHEK MAHMUD COLLEGE | JAMALPUR | Govt. | 109996 | JAMALPUR |
| 5002 | MADARGANJ A. H. Z. GOVT. COLLEGE | JAMALPUR | Govt. | 110076 | GABERGRM |
| 5003 | MELANDAH GOVT. COLLEGE | JAMALPUR | Govt. | 110150 | MELANDAH |
| 5004 | JAHEDA SAFIR MAHILA COLLEGE | JAMALPUR | Govt. | 109994 | JAMALPUR |
| 5005 | NANDINA SK. ANOWER HOSSAIN COLLEGE | JAMALPUR | Non Govt. | 109991 | NANDINA |
| 5006 | GOVT. ABDUL KHALEK MEMORIAL COLLEGE | JAMALPUR | Govt. | 109776 | DEWANGANJ |
| 5007 | SANONDABARI COLLEGE | JAMALPUR | Non Govt. | 109777 | SANANDABARI |
| 5008 | GOVT. ISLAMPUR COLLEGE | JAMALPUR | Govt. | 109857 | ISLAMPUR |
| 5009 | SHARISABARI MAHMUDA SALAM MOHILA COLLEGE | JAMALPUR | Non Govt. | 110214 | ARAMNAGAR |
| 5010 | SUJAT ALI COLLEGE, PINGNA | JAMALPUR | Non Govt. | 110217 | PINGINA |
| 5011 | SARISHABARI COLLEGE | JAMALPUR | Non Govt. | 110215 | SARISHABARI |
| 5012 | BAKSHIGANJ KEAMATULLAH GOVT. COLLEGE | JAMALPUR | Govt. | 109725 | BAKSHIGONI |
| 5013 | NURUNNAHAR MIRZA KASEM MAHILA COLLEGE | JAMALPUR | Non Govt. | 110077 | MADARGONJ, JAMALPUR |
| 5014 | JAHANARA LATIF MAHILA COLLEGE | JAMALPUR | Non Govt. | 110149 | MELANDAH |
| 5015 | JHOWLA GUPALPUR COLLEGE | JAMALPUR | Non Govt. | 109992 | GOPALPUR BAZAR |
| 5016 | HAZRABARI SERAJUL HUQ COLLEGE | JAMALPUR | Non Govt. | 110151 | HAZRABARI |
| 5017 | ISLAMPUR MD. ABDUS SAMAD- PERVEZ MEMORIAL MOHILA COLLEGE | JAMALPUR | Non Govt. | 109855 | MOUZAZALLAH |
| 5018 | DIGPAIT SHAMSUL HAQ COLLEGE | JAMALPUR | Non Govt. | 109997 | DIGPAIT, JAMALPUR |
| 5019 | JAMALPUR LAW COLLEGE | JAMALPUR | Non Govt. | | Bazrapur, Jamalpur |
| 5020 | MIRZA AZAM COLLEGE | JAMALPUR | Non Govt. | 110078 | GUNERBARI |
| 5021 | KHATEMOON MOIN MOHILA COLLEGE | JAMALPUR | Non Govt. | 109724 | BAKSHIGANJ |
| 5023 | INSTITUTE OF BUSINESS ADMINISTRATION JAMALPUR | JAMALPUR | Non Govt. | | GULAPBUG JAMALPUR SADAR |
| 5024 | SHAHID ZIAUR RAHMAN DEGREE COLLEGE | JAMALPUR | Non Govt. | 109995 | JAMALPUR SADOR |
| 5025 | HABIBUR RAHAMAN COLLEGE | JAMALPUR | Non Govt. | 110152 | MAHMUDPUR |
| 5026 | DR. ABDUL MAZID TALUKDER DEGREE COLLEGE | JAMALPUR | Non Govt. | 110000 | RUPSHI KAMALKHAN HAT |
| 5027 | POGALDIGHA COLLEGE | JAMALPUR | Non Govt. | 110218 | TARAKANDI |
| 5028 | KHAWJA SHAH SUFI YUNUS ALI COLLEGE | JAMALPUR | Non Govt. | 110079 | NAYAPARA |
| 5029 | BANGABANDHU GOVT. COLLEGE JHAWGARA | JAMALPUR | Govt. | 110146 | JHAWGORA |
| 5030 | M M MEMORIAL COLLEGE | JAMALPUR | Non Govt. | 109778 | KATHERBILL, HATIVANGA |
| 5031 | TULSHIPUR COLLEGE | JAMALPUR | Non Govt. | 109999 | Rashidpur |
| 5032 | JINNATON AFSOR MOHILA COLLEGE | JAMALPUR | Non Govt. | 109993 | Narundi Bazar, Jamalpur Sadar |
| 5201 | Ananda Mohan College | MYMENSINGH | Govt. | 111911 | COLLEGE ROAD, MYMENSINGH |
| 5202 | GOVT. MOMINUNNESSA MAHILA COLLEGE | MYMENSINGH | Govt. | 111915 | K C ROY ROAD |
| 5203 | MYMENSINGH MAHILA COLLEGE | MYMENSINGH | Non Govt. | 111916 | 31. C K GHOSH ROAD |
| 5204 | NASIRABAD COLLEGE | MYMENSINGH | Non Govt. | 111912 | SADAR, MYMENSINGH |
| 5205 | MYMENSINGH COLLEGE | MYMENSINGH | Non Govt. | 111914 | 42. RAMBABU ROAD MYMENSINGH |
| 5206 | A. M. M. COLLEGE | MYMENSINGH | Non Govt. | 111918 | C.K. GOSH. ROAD |
| 5207 | GAFARGAON GOVT. COLLEGE | MYMENSINGH | Govt. | 111663 | GAFARGAON, MYMENSINGH |
| 5208 | ABDUR RAHMAN COLLEGE | MYMENSINGH | Non Govt. | 111665 | KANDIPARA, GAFARGAON |
| 5209 | PHULPUR GOVT. COLLEGE | MYMENSINGH | Govt. | 112183 | COLLEGE ROAD, PHULPUR |
| 5210 | GOVERNMENT DHOBAURA ADARSHA COLLEGE | MYMENSINGH | Govt. | 111386 | DHOBAURA |
| 5211 | HALUAGHAT SHAHID SMRITI GOVT. COLLEGE | MYMENSINGH | Govt. | 111768 | HALUAGHAT |
| 5212 | GOURIPUR GOVT. COLLEGE | MYMENSINGH | Govt. | 111722 | GOURIPUR |
| 5213 | GOURIPUR MAHILA COLLEGE | MYMENSINGH | Non Govt. | 111723 | UPAZILA SADAR, GOURIPUR |
| 5214 | GOVT. NAZRUL COLLEGE, TRISHAL | MYMENSINGH | Govt. | 112293 | TRISHAL, MYMENSINGH |
| 5215 | FULBARIA COLLEGE | MYMENSINGH | Non Govt. | 111516 | FULBARIA, MYMENSINGH. |
| 5216 | SHAHID SMRITI GOVT. COLLEGE, MUKTAGACHHA | MYMENSINGH | Govt. | 111999 | MUKTAGACHA, MYMENSINGH |
| 5217 | GOVT. SHAHID SMRITI ADARSHA COLLEGE, NANDAIL | MYMENSINGH | Govt. | 112070 | CHANDIPASHA, NANDAIL |
| 5218 | ISWARGANJ GOVERNMENT COLLEGE | MYMENSINGH | Govt. | 111821 | ISHWARGONJ |
| 5219 | BHALUKA GOVERNMENT COLLEGE | MYMENSINGH | Govt. | 111354 | Bhaluka |
| 5220 | BANGABANDU DEGREE COLLEGE | MYMENSINGH | Govt. | 112185 | TARAKANDA, FULPUR, |
| 5221 | ATHAROBARI COLLEGE | MYMENSINGH | Non Govt. | 111822 | ATHAROBARI |
| 5222 | TRISHAL MAHILA COLLEGE | MYMENSINGH | Non Govt. | 112292 | TRISHAL BAZER, Trishal |
| 5223 | HAZI KASHEM ALI MOHILA DEGREE COLLEGE | MYMENSINGH | Non Govt. | 112000 | MUKTAGACHA |
| 5224 | ALTAF GOLONDAJ MAHABIDDALAYA | MYMENSINGH | Non Govt. | 111664 | GAFARGAON |
| 5225 | SONAR BANGLA DEGREE COLLEGE | MYMENSINGH | Non Govt. | 111353 | BATAJURE, BATAJURE BAZAAR |
| 5226 | GABTOLI DEGREE COLLEGE | MYMENSINGH | Non Govt. | 112001 | PARULITALA, GABTOLI |
| 5227 | STATE INSTITUTE OF BUSINESS ADMINISTRATION AND COMPUTER SCIENCE (SIBACS) | MYMENSINGH | Non Govt. | | 76, JAIL ROAD |
| 5228 | COLLEGE OF BUSINESS, SCIENCE & TECHNOLOGY (CBST) | MYMENSINGH | Non Govt. | | PONDIT PARA |
| 5229 | PHULPUR MOHILA DEGREE COLLEGE | MYMENSINGH | Non Govt. | 112184 | GODARIA, PHULPUR |
| 5230 | MOMENSHAHI LAW COLLEGE | MYMENSINGH | Non Govt. | | Gangina para more |
| 5231 | TEACHERS' EDUCATION COMPLEX, MUKTAGACHA | MYMENSINGH | Non Govt. | 133278 | Mukagasha, Mymensingh |
| 5232 | GOVT. TEACHERS' TRAINING COLLEGE (MOHILA) | MYMENSINGH | Govt. | 133609 | Sadar, Mymensingh |
| 5233 | GOVT. TEACHERS' TRAINING COLLEGE | MYMENSINGH | Govt. | 133367 | MYMENSINGH |
| 5235 | INSTITUTE OF LIBRARY AND INFORMATION SCIENCE | MYMENSINGH | Non Govt. | | MUKUL NIKETON HIGH SCHOOL CAMPUS |
| 5236 | SHILPACHARYA ZAINUL ABEDIN FINE ART INSTITUTE | MYMENSINGH | Non Govt. | 133469 | MASKANDA |
| 5237 | DHARA ADARSHA DEGREE COLLEGE | MYMENSINGH | Non Govt. | 111770 | KOYRAHATY DHARA |
| 5238 | GAFARGAON MOHILA COLLEGE | MYMENSINGH | Non Govt. | 111662 | GAFARGAON |
| 5239 | GOVT. PHYSICAL EDUCATION COLLEGE | MYMENSINGH | Govt. | | Sadar |
| 5240 | SHAHABUDDIN COLLEGE | MYMENSINGH | Non Govt. | 111517 | FULBARIA |
| 5241 | SHOMURTA JAHAN MAHILA COLLEGE | MYMENSINGH | Non Govt. | 112069 | NANDAIL, MYMENSINGH. |
| 5242 | DHOBAURA MOHILA DEGREE COLLEGE | MYMENSINGH | Non Govt. | 111387 | DHAIR PARA, DHOBAURA |
| 5243 | FULBARIA MOHILA COLLEGE | MYMENSINGH | Non Govt. | 111522 | FULBARIA |
| 5244 | KHURRAM KHAN CHOWDHURY DEGREE COLLEGE | MYMENSINGH | Non Govt. | 112068 | BALALABAD, MUZZAMPUR |
| 5245 | CITY INSTITUTE | MYMENSINGH | Non Govt. | | KANCHIJULY, SADAR |
| 5246 | SHAMBHUGONJ GKP COLLEGE | MYMENSINGH | Non Govt. | | SADAR, MYMENSINGH. |
| 5247 | BOWLA COLLEGE | MYMENSINGH | Non Govt. | 112187 | Bowla, Fulpur |
| 5248 | HAJI CHERAG ALI DEGREE COLLEGE | MYMENSINGH | Non Govt. | 112294 | TRISHAL, MYMENSINGH |
| 5249 | HALUAGHAT ADARSHA MOHILA COLLEGE | MYMENSINGH | Non Govt. | 111769 | Haluaghat |
| 5250 | SUPREME LAW COLLEGE | MYMENSINGH | Non Govt. | | SADAR, MYMENSINGH |
| 5251 | BHALUKA TRISHAL MAITRY COLLEGE | MYMENSINGH | Non Govt. | 133786 | Trishal |
| 5252 | KESHORGONJ DEGREE COLLEGE | MYMENSINGH | Non Govt. | 111521 | |
| 5253 | BRITISH BANGLA INSTITUTE OF MANAGEMENT & TECHNOLOGY | MYMENSINGH | Non Govt. | | 23 Rambabu Road |
| 5254 | KAORAID GOYESPUR COLLEGE | MYMENSINGH | Non Govt. | 111666 | MYMENSINGH |
| 5255 | METROPOLITAN COLLEGE | MYMENSINGH | Non Govt. | | |
| 5256 | CHANDAPUR COLLEGE | MYMENSINGH | Non Govt. | 112188 | MYMENSINGH |
| 5257 | MUSHULI COLLEGE | MYMENSINGH | Non Govt. | 138916 | |
| 5258 | SHEIKH MUJIB COLLEGE | MYMENSINGH | Non Govt. | 134244 | Tarakanda, Mymensingh |
| 4801 | NETRAKONA GOVT. COLLEGE | NETROKONA | Govt. | 113194 | SATPAI, NETRAKONA |
| 4802 | HAFEZ ZIAUR RAHMAN COLLEGE | NETROKONA | Non Govt. | 113251 | SHYAMGONJ BAZAR |
| 4803 | SHAH SULTAN COLLEGE | NETROKONA | Non Govt. | 113196 | MADANPUR |
| 4804 | NETRAKONA GOVT. MAHILA COLLEGE | NETROKONA | Govt. | 113192 | MOKTER PARA |
| 4805 | KENDUA GOVERNMENT COLLEGE | NETROKONA | Govt. | 113076 | KENDUA, NETRAKONA |
| 4807 | GOVERNMENT KRISHNAPUR HAZI ALI AKBAR PUBLIC DEGREE COLLEGE | NETROKONA | Govt. | 112989 | KHALIAJURI, NETRAKONA |
| 4808 | TELIGATI GOVERNMENT COLLEGE | NETROKONA | Govt. | 112911 | TELIGATI, ATPARA |
| 4809 | PURBODHALA DEGREE COLLEGE | NETROKONA | Govt. | 113250 | PURBADHALA |
| 4810 | SUSANG GOVT. COLLEGE, DURGAPUR | NETROKONA | Govt. | 112975 | SADHUPARA |
| 4811 | ABU ABBAS COLLEGE | NETROKONA | Non Govt. | 113195 | NETRAKONA |
| 4812 | MOHANGONJ GOVT. COLLEGE | NETROKONA | Govt. | 113129 | MOHANGONJ |
| 4813 | BARHATTA GOVT. COLLEGE | NETROKONA | Govt. | 112938 | BARHATTA |
| 4814 | KALMAKANDA GOVERNMENT COLLEGE | NETROKONA | Govt. | 113025 | KALMAKANDA |
| 4815 | RABEYA ALI MOHILA COLLEGE | NETROKONA | Non Govt. | 113249 | PURBADHALA |
| 4816 | NETROKONA LAW COLLEGE | NETROKONA | Non Govt. | 133771 | Puraton Court Road |
| 4817 | KHAN SHAHEB ABDUL AZIZ TEACHERS' TRAINING COLLEGE | NETROKONA | Non Govt. | | Muktapara, Sadar |
| 4818 | DURGAPUR MOHILA DEGREE COLLEGE | NETROKONA | Non Govt. | 112974 | SUSANG, DURGAPUR |
| 4819 | HAJI ABDUL AZIZ KHAN COLLEGE | NETROKONA | Govt. | 113104 | MADAN |
| 4820 | MOHANGONJ MOHILA COLLEGE | NETROKONA | Non Govt. | 113130 | MOHANGONJ |
| 4821 | CHANDRANATH COLLEGE | NETROKONA | Non Govt. | 113193 | NETROKONA SADAR |
| 4822 | FAQUIR ASHRAF COLLEGE | NETROKONA | Non Govt. | 131946 | NETROKONA |
| 4823 | NETROVISION INSTITUTE | NETROKONA | Non Govt. | | Netrokona Sadar |
| 4824 | JOBAIDA RAHMAN MOHILA COLLEGE | NETROKONA | Non Govt. | 113105 | MADAN |
| 4825 | ATPARA COLLEGE | NETROKONA | Non Govt. | 112912 | Bruzer Bazaar Road, Atpara |
| 4826 | GONDA DEGREE COLLEGE | NETROKONA | Non Govt. | 113077 | Kendua |
| 5101 | SHERPUR GOVT. COLLEGE | SHERPUR | Govt. | 113915 | RAJABARI |
| 5102 | GOVT. NAZMUL SMRITI COLLEGE | SHERPUR | Govt. | 113826 | NALITABARI, SHERPUR |
| 5103 | GOVT. HAZI JAL MAHMUD COLLEGE | SHERPUR | Govt. | 113770 | NAKLA, SHERPUR. |
| 5104 | SHERPUR MAHILA COLLEGE | SHERPUR | Govt. | 113914 | SHERPUR SADAR |
| 5105 | SRIBORDI GOVT. COLLEGE | SHERPUR | Govt. | 113973 | SRIBORDI, SHERPUR |
| 5106 | CHOWDHURY SABRUNNESSA MAHILA COLLEGE | SHERPUR | Non Govt. | 113769 | KURSHABADAGOUR |
| 5107 | NALITABARI SHAHID ABDUR RASHID MOHILA COLLEGE | SHERPUR | Non Govt. | 113827 | NALITABARI PAURASHAVA |
| 5108 | GOVT. ADARSHA COLLEGE | SHERPUR | Govt. | 113718 | Hatibandha, Malijhikanda |
| 5109 | JAMSHED ALI MEMORIAL (DEGREE) COLLEGE | SHERPUR | Non Govt. | 113919 | KUSUMHATI |
| 5110 | CHANDRAKONA COLLEGE | SHERPUR | Non Govt. | 113771 | BANDATEKI, CHANDRAKONA |
| 5111 | JHENAIGATI MAHILA ADARSHA DEGREE COLLEGE | SHERPUR | Non Govt. | 113717 | JHENAIGATI |
| 5112 | DR. SEKANDER ALI COLLEGE | SHERPUR | Non Govt. | 113916 | SHRPUR TOWN, SHERPUR |
| 5113 | ALHAZ SHAFIUDDIN AHMED COLLEGE | SHERPUR | Non Govt. | 113719 | JHINAIGATI |
| 5114 | MODEL GIRLS COLLEGE | SHERPUR | Non Govt. | 113918 | SHERPUR |
| 5115 | BEER MUKTIJUDDHA ATIUR RAHMAN MODEL COLLEGE | SHERPUR | Non Govt. | 131500 | SHERPUR SADAR |
| 5116 | HALIMA AHSAN INSTITUTE | SHERPUR | Non Govt. | | Sreebordi |
