= Saidpur Government Science College =

Location
- Bimanbondar Road, Bangalipur; Saidpur; Nilphamari, 5310; Bangladesh

Information
- Former names: Saidpur Government Technical School (till 1977); Saidpur Government Technical College (till 2019)
- Type: Public
- Motto: Education is power
- Established: December 15, 1964; 61 years ago
- School board: Board of Intermediate and Secondary Education, Dinajpur
- School district: Nilphamari District
- Principal: Abul Kalam Azad
- Teaching staff: 38
- Employees: 17
- Grades: 6-12
- Enrollment: 989
- Language: Bengali
- Area: 10.05 Acre
- Campus type: suburb
- Website: sgtc.gov.bd

Saidpur Government Science College (formerly known as Saidpur Government Technical College) is an educational institution located in Saidpur under the Rangpur Division. It is situated near Saidpur Airport in the Nilphamari District. The college provides education at the secondary and higher secondary levels under the Dinajpur Education Board. According to the Bangladesh Bureau of Educational Information and Statistics, the institution currently spans an area of 10.05 acres and has 989 students enrolled.

== History ==
In 1964, technical schools were established in four industrial regions of Bangladesh. Taking advantage of the country's largest Saidpur railway workshop, Saidpur Government Technical School was founded as a government secondary school. Later, in 1977, the institution was upgraded to a college and renamed Syedpur Government Technical College. In 2019, the Ministry of Education changed its name to Saidpur Government Science College. Currently, the institution offers education from grades six to twelve. For grades nine and ten, as well as grades eleven and twelve, there are two sections each. This institution exclusively provides education in the science stream.

== See also ==
- Saidpur Government College
- Nilphamari Government High School
- Rangpur Government College
