= Nilphamari Govt. College =

Public higher education institution in Nilphamari, Bangladesh

Coordinates: 25.9315°N 88.8422°E

Nilphamari Government College
- নীলফামারী সরকারি কলেজ
- Type: Public College
- Established: May 16, 1958; 68 years ago
- Academic affiliations: National University; Dinajpur Education Board (HSC)
- Principal: Mahbubur Rahman Bhuiyan
- Academic staff: 69
- Students: 14,807
- Undergraduates: 10,576
- Postgraduates: 2,626
- Other students: 1,605 (HSC)
- Location: Modda Harua, Nilphamari, 5300, Bangladesh
- Campus: 23.15 acres (9.37 ha); Urban
- Language: Bengali
- Nickname: NGC
- Website: www.ngc.edu.bd

Nilphamari Government College is a public higher secondary and tertiary education institution in Nilphamari District, Bangladesh. Established in 1958, the college is located in the heart of Nilphamari town. Currently, it offers higher secondary education under the Dinajpur Education Board and bachelor's (pass) courses in five subjects, bachelor's (honors) courses in 14 subjects, and postgraduate programs under the National University. As of 2024, the college has 14,807 enrolled students.

== History ==
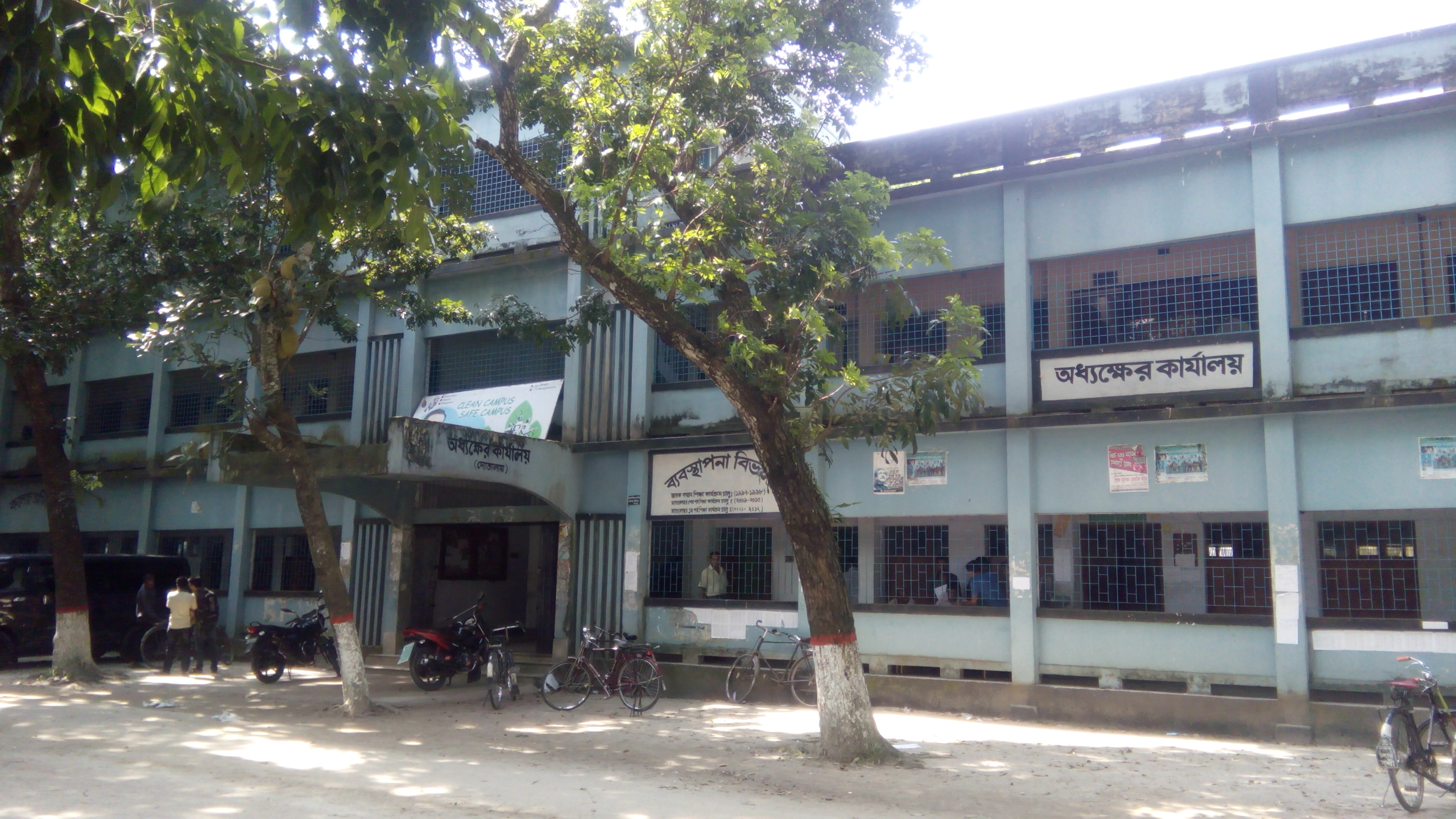
Principal's Office

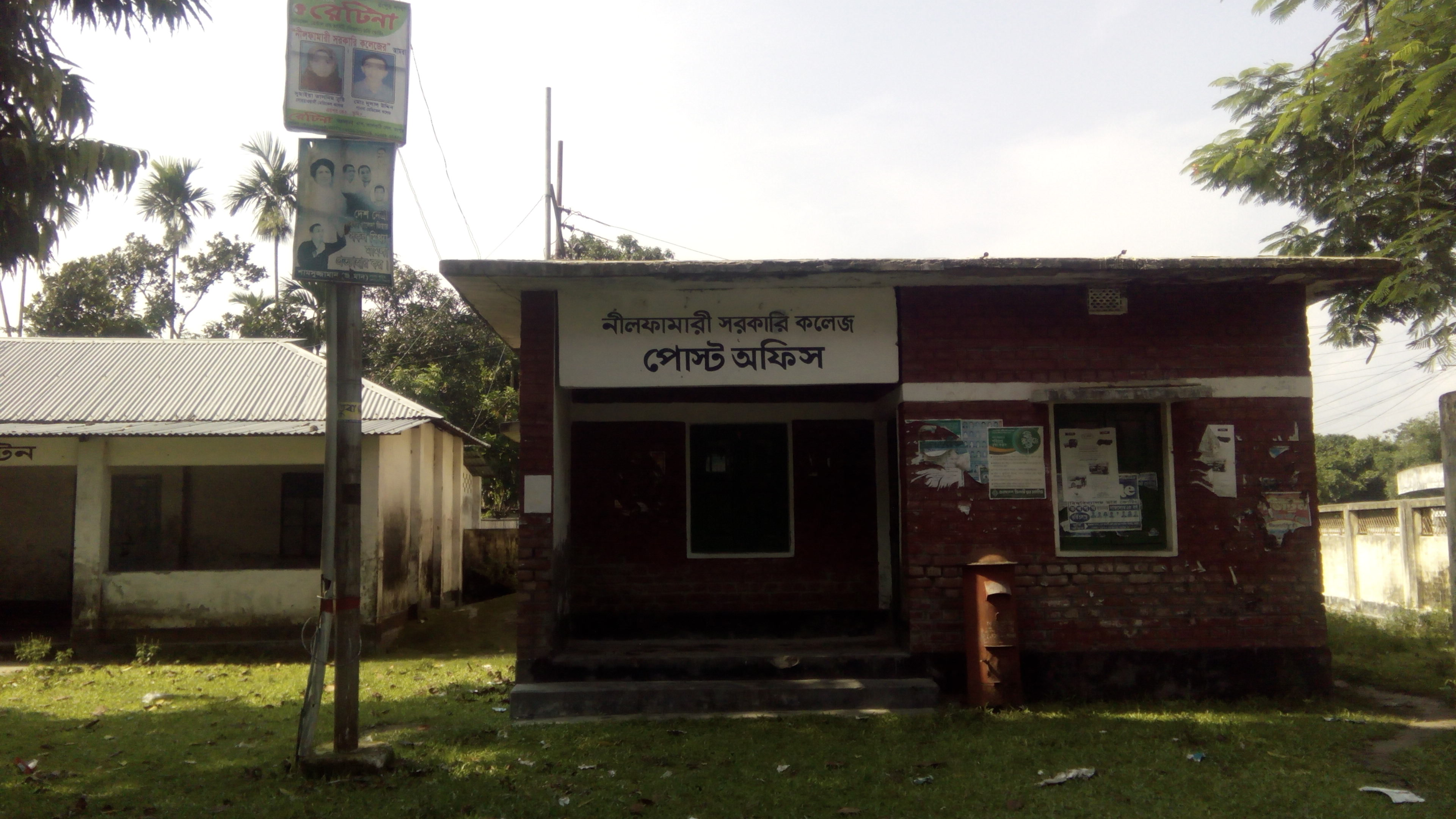
College Post Office

On May 16, 1958, Nilphamari Government College was established in the Nilphamari Subdivision of the then Rangpur District. Initially, the college offered higher secondary and undergraduate courses under the Rajshahi Education Board and Rajshahi University. Later, in 1979, it was nationalized. Currently, the college offers honors courses in 14 subjects. Significant changes occurred in its academic activities after Nilphamari Subdivision was upgraded to a district. At present, the college operates under the Dinajpur Education Board and is affiliated with the National University.

== Academics ==
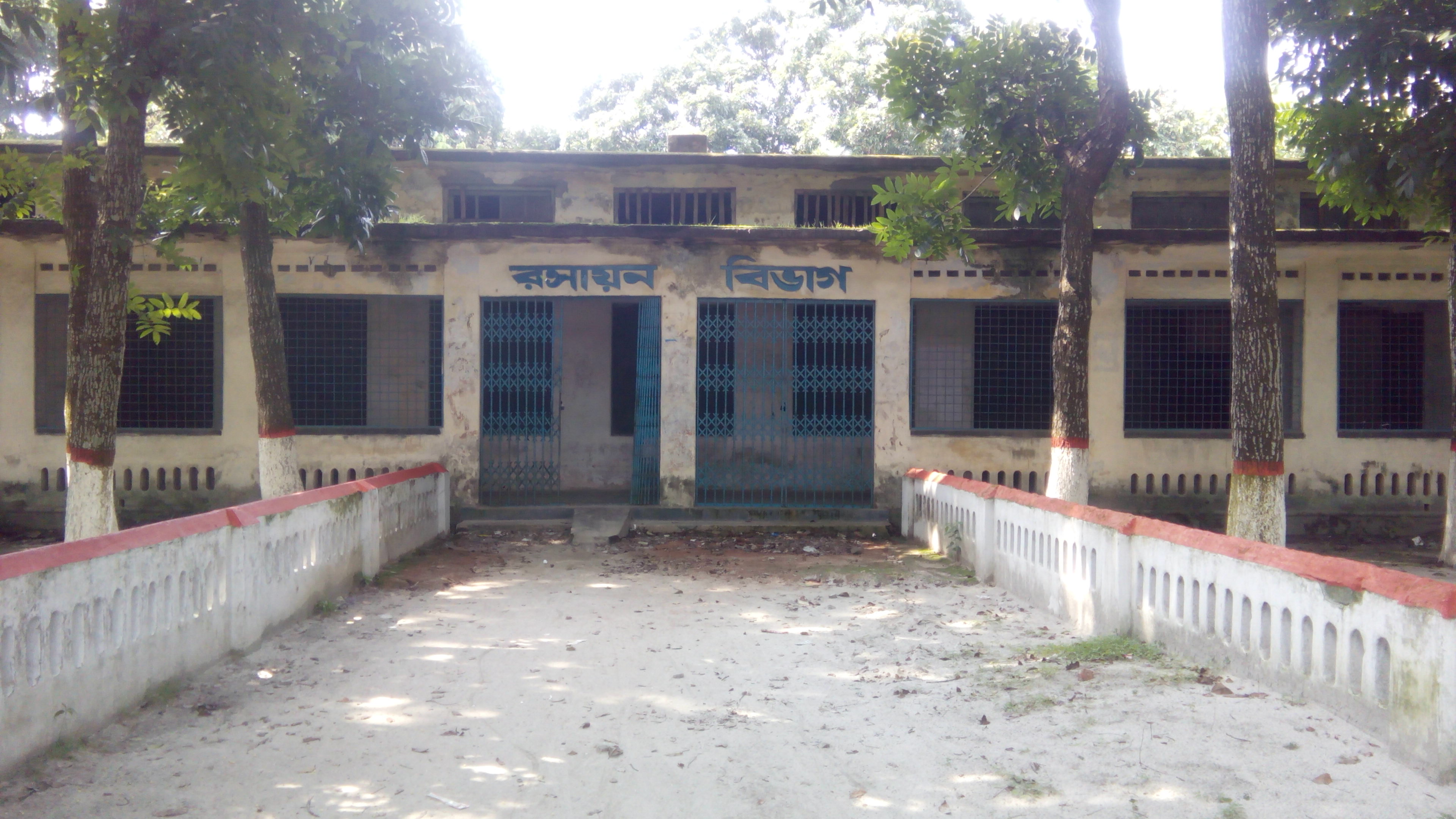
Chemistry Department

Nilphamari Government College offers education at the higher secondary, bachelor's (honors and pass), and master's levels.

=== Higher secondary (HSC) programs ===
- Science: 320 seats
- Humanities: 300 seats
- Business Studies: 200 seats

=== Bachelor’s degree (pass) courses ===
- B.A. (Pass)
- B.S.S. (Pass)
- B.Sc. (Pass)
- B.B.S. (Pass)
- C.C.

=== Bachelor’s degree (honors) courses ===
- Department of Bengali
- Department of English
- Department of History
- Department of Islamic History & Culture
- Department of Philosophy
- Department of Political Science
- Department of Economics
- Department of Accounting
- Department of Management
- Department of Physics
- Department of Chemistry
- Department of Botany
- Department of Zoology
- Department of Mathematics

=== Master’s final courses ===
- Department of Bengali
- Department of English
- Department of History
- Department of Islamic History & Culture
- Department of Philosophy
- Department of Political Science
- Department of Economics
- Department of Accounting
- Department of Management
- Department of Chemistry
- Department of Botany
- Department of Mathematics

=== Master's preliminary courses ===
- Department of Bengali
- Department of English
- Department of History
- Department of Islamic History & Culture
- Department of Philosophy
- Department of Political Science
- Department of Sociology
- Department of Economics
- Department of Accounting
- Department of Management

== Hostels ==
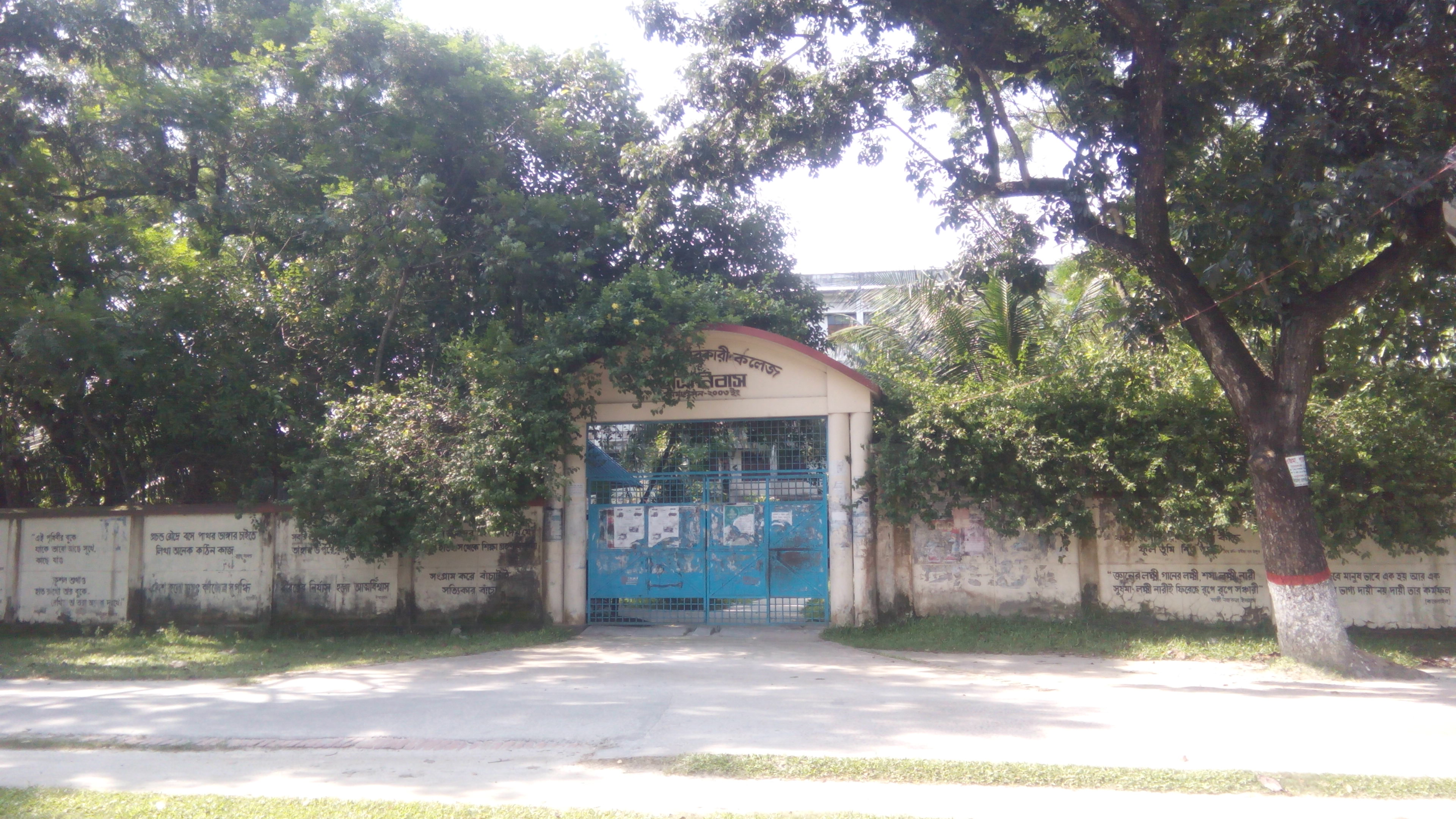
Female hostels

The college has a total of three hostels—one for male students and two for female students. The campus also features its own playground, and the Nilphamari Stadium is located adjacent to the college premises.

== Ranking ==
In 2018, it was recognized as one of the top ten colleges in the Rangpur region in the National University college ranking.

== See more ==
- Saidpur Government College
- Zila Parishad School and College, Nilphamari
- Saidpur Govt. Science College
- Gaibandha Govt. College
- Rangpur Government College
