= Gaibandha Govt. College =

Public higher education institution in Gaibandha, Bangladesh

Coordinates: 25°19′27″N 89°32′18″E

- গাইবান্ধা সরকারি কলেজ
- Motto in English: Knowledge is power
- Type: Public College
- Established: July 1, 1947; 79 years ago
- Academic affiliations: National University; Dinajpur Education Board (HSC)
- Principal: Abdur Rashid
- Academic staff: 61
- Students: 13,302
- Undergraduates: 10,443
- Postgraduates: 1,199
- Location: College Road, Paschim Gobindpur, Gaibandha, 5700, Bangladesh
- Campus: 13.39 acres (5.42 ha); Urban
- Language: Bengali
- Nickname: GGC
- Website: ggc.edu.bd

Gaibandha Govt. College is a public higher education institution in Gaibandha, Bangladesh. It was established on July 1, 1947, and is located on College Road in Paschim Gobindapur. The college offers higher secondary education in Science, Humanities and Commerce. It also provides Bachelor's (Pass) courses, Bachelor's (Honors) programs in 14 subjects, and Master's programs in 14 subjects. As of 2024, a total of 13,302 students are studying at this college.

== History ==
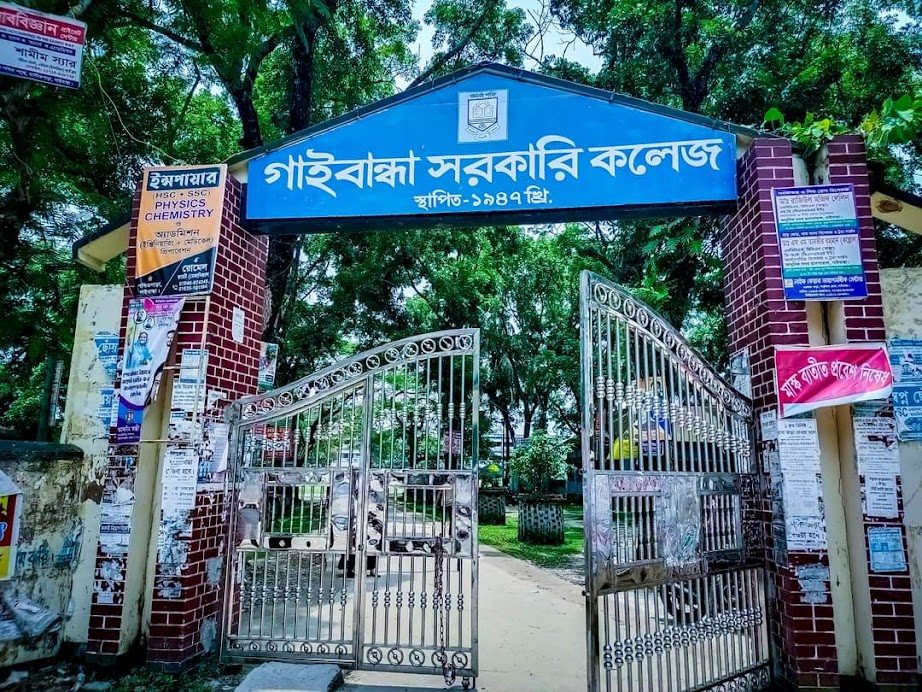
Main entrance of the college

Gaibandha Government College was established on July 1, 1947. It started with Acting Principal Ashwini Kumar Chowdhury, seven teachers, and 23 students, initially offering only the Humanities stream. Phanibhushan Roy served as the first principal. In the mid-1950s, Principal N.C. Sen and Bangladesh's first Jatiya Sangsad Speaker, Shah Abdul Hamid, made significant contributions to the development of the college. On March 1, 1980, the college was nationalized, with Gias Uddin serving as the acting principal at that time.

The college is now located on 13.39 acres of land, with well-arranged buildings. There are two large ponds on the east and west sides of the campus, and an old tin-shed building on the north side, which represents the college's heritage. In the 1950s, this building was used for both day and night classes.

== Academic Programs ==
Currently, the college offers education under the Dinajpur Education Board for higher secondary levels and under the National University for Bachelor's (Pass), Bachelor's (Honors), and Master's programs.

=== Higher Secondary (HSC) Programs ===
- Science
- Humanities
- Commerce

=== Bachelor's (Pass) Courses ===
- B.A. (Pass)
- B.S.S. (Pass)
- B.Sc. (Pass)
- B.B.S. (Pass)
- C.C.

=== Bachelor's (Honors) Courses ===
- Department of Bangla
- Department of English
- Department of History
- Department of Islamic History & Culture
- Department of Philosophy
- Department of Political Science
- Department of Economics
- Department of Accounting
- Department of Management
- Department of Physics
- Department of Chemistry
- Department of Botany
- Department of Zoology
- Department of Mathematics

=== Master's Final Courses ===
- Department of Bangla
- Department of English
- Department of History
- Department of Islamic History & Culture
- Department of Philosophy
- Department of Political Science
- Department of Economics
- Department of Accounting
- Department of Management
- Department of Physics
- Department of Chemistry
- Department of Botany
- Department of Zoology
- Department of Mathematics

=== Master's Preliminary Courses ===
- Department of History
- Department of Political Science
- Department of Botany

== Students ==
According to the Bangladesh Bureau of Educational Information and Statistics, a total of 13,302 students were enrolled in 2024. This includes 1,660 students in the Higher Secondary level, 1,911 in the Bachelor's (Pass) course, 8,532 in the Bachelor's (Honors) course, and 1,199 in the Master's program.

== Ranking ==
In 2018, it was recognized as one of the top ten colleges in the Rangpur region in the National University college ranking.

== See more ==
- Rangpur Government College
- Nilphamari Govt. College
