= Angarpara Borobari Mosque =

Mosque in Nilfamari, Bangladesh

Coordinates: 25°52′58.2″N 88°48′05.2″E

- আঙ্গারপাড়া বড়বাড়ি মসজিদ

Religion
- Affiliation: Islam
- Branch/tradition: Sunni
- District: Nilphamari
- Status: Active

Location
- Location: Angarpara, Kundapukur Union
- Country: Bangladesh
- Interactive map of Angarpara Borobari Mosque

Architecture
- Style: Mughal

Specifications
- Direction of façade: East
- Capacity: 150
- Length: 38 Feet
- Width: 9 Feet
- Dome: 3
- Minaret: 8

Angarpara Borobari Mosque (Bengali: আঙ্গারপাড়া বড়বাড়ি মসজিদ) is a congregational mosque built in Mughal architectural style. It is located 12 kilometers southeast of Nilphamari city, in Angarpara village of Kundapukur Union, Nilphamari Sadar Upazila. The mosque can accommodate 150 people for prayer in six rows.

== History ==
The exact construction period of the mosque is unknown, but the architectural features are in the Mughal style, which indicates that the mosques were built during the Mughal era. In 1981, local resident Asaduzzaman Kabir, following the advice of a Pir in Faridpur, excavated to the east of the mosque and unearthed two ancient graves. From the mosque's inscription, one of the graves can be identified as belonging to a person named Mahmudullah Hasan. They are assumed to be the founders of the mosque. In 2001, with the help of locals, a permanent room was built and connected to the old mosque, expanding it by six rows.

== Description ==
Bara Bari Mosque was built on a rectangular land layout with three domes and eight minarets. Its length is 38 feet and width is 9 feet. There are three doors in the eastern wall for entering the main mosque, each door being three feet high and two feet wide. An Arabic inscription is engraved above the middle door. Over time, from the faded inscription, the name of Mahmudullah Hassan and the Arabic number '616' can be identified. Both the mosque and the tomb were built with bricks of the same size (10 inches X 2 inches).
