= Zikrul Haque =

Shaheed Dr. Sheikh Zikrul Haque
- শেখ জিকরুল হক

Personal details
- Born: 1 September 1914 Saidpur, Rangpur district, Bengal Presidency
- Died: 12 April 1971 (aged 56) Rangpur Cantonment, East Pakistan
- Education: Nil Ratan Sircar Medical College and Hospital; Saidpur English High School
- Occupation: Physician

Sheikh Zikrul Haque (Bengali: শেখ জিকরুল হক; 1 September 1914 — 12 April 1971), also spelt Jekrul Haque, was a physician and politician who was elected to the East Pakistan Provincial Assembly in 1970. He was killed in the Bangladesh Liberation war and is considered a Martyr in Bangladesh.

== Early life and education ==
Haque was born on 1 September 1914 to a Bengali family of Muslim Sheikhs in Saidpur, Rangpur district, Bengal Presidency. He was the son of Dr. Sheikh Zearatullah Ahmad and Khamiunnesa Chaudhurani. He passed his matriculation from Saidpur English High School in 1933 and received his Licentiate of Medical Faculty from Campbell Medical School in Calcutta in 1939. During his time at the medical school, he made contact with the likes of Prime Minister A.K. Fazlul Haq and Huseyn Shaheed Suhrawardy. He was a member of the All India Muslim Students Federation from 1930 to 1940.

== Career ==
Haque's career began at the Hazarihat Charitable Dispensary under Darwary Hospital in Saidpur as an unpaid medical officer. He then continued this role at the Shah Abdul Ghafur Charitable Dispensary in Dangarhat. After that, he worked at Zearatullah Medical Hall.

He joined the Muslim League after the Partition of Bengal in 1947, serving as the secretary of its Nilphamari branch and later its president. Haque also served as the vice-president of the Rangpur District Muslim League. During the 1954 East Bengal Legislative Assembly election, he defeated the United Front candidate and was elected as an independent to the East Bengal Legislative Assembly. Four years later, he was elected chairman of the Saidpur Municipality. Haque was elected to the East Pakistan Provincial Assembly after the 1970 East Pakistan Provincial Assembly election as an Awami League candidate. He supported the Non-cooperation movement in 1971.

== Death and legacy ==
A clash occurred between Bengalis and Biharis on 23 March 1971 after the raising of the Flag of Pakistan in Saidpur, to which many took shelter at Haque's residence. Two days later, he was detained by the Pakistan Army from his residence. Haque was kept in Rangpur Cantonment, where he was tortured. He was executed with other detainees on 12 April 1971. Bangladesh Post Office issued commemorative postal stamp on 14 December 1996. He was posthumously awarded the Independence Award in 2001 by the Government of Bangladesh.
