= Saidpur Pilot High School =

Coordinates: 25.7785°N 88.9013°E

- সৈয়দপুর পাইলট উচ্চ বিদ্যালয়
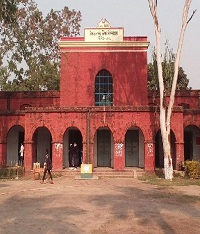
- "Saidpur High School"
- Rangpur Road, Saidpur; Bangladesh

Information
- Type: Public high school
- Established: 1906
- School board: Board of Intermediate and Secondary Education, Dinajpur
- Grades: Class 6 to 10
- Gender: Boys and girls
- Enrollment: About 1000
- Language: Bengali
- Sports: Cricket, football, handball, badminton, basketball
- EIIN: 125198

Saidpur Pilot High School (Bengali: সৈয়দপুর পাইলট উচ্চ বিদ্যালয়) is a semi-official secondary school in Saidpur, a city in Bangladesh. It is one of the oldest schools in the country.

This school mainly called as "Saidpur High School" (সৈয়দপুর উচ্চ বিদ্যালয়) and also previous name "Bangla High School" Designation : "Father School " "Thana School" of Saidpur city. Syllabus- Bangla Medium according to Dinajpur Education Board. Before Established of Dinajpur Education Board the school was under Rajshahi Education Board.

== History ==
The school, in the center of Saidpur town, was established in 1906.

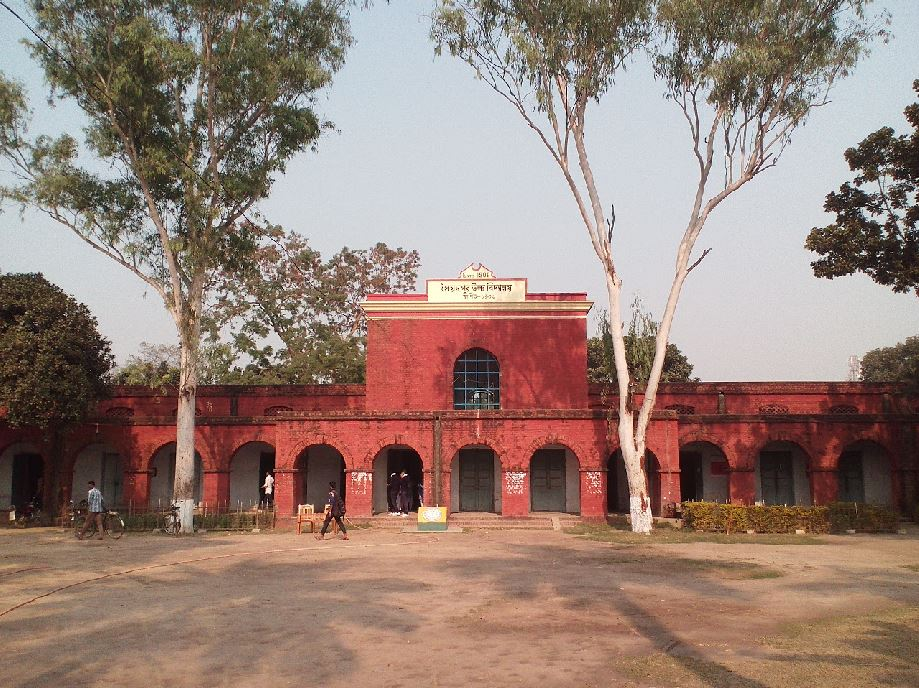
Main building of Saidpur High School

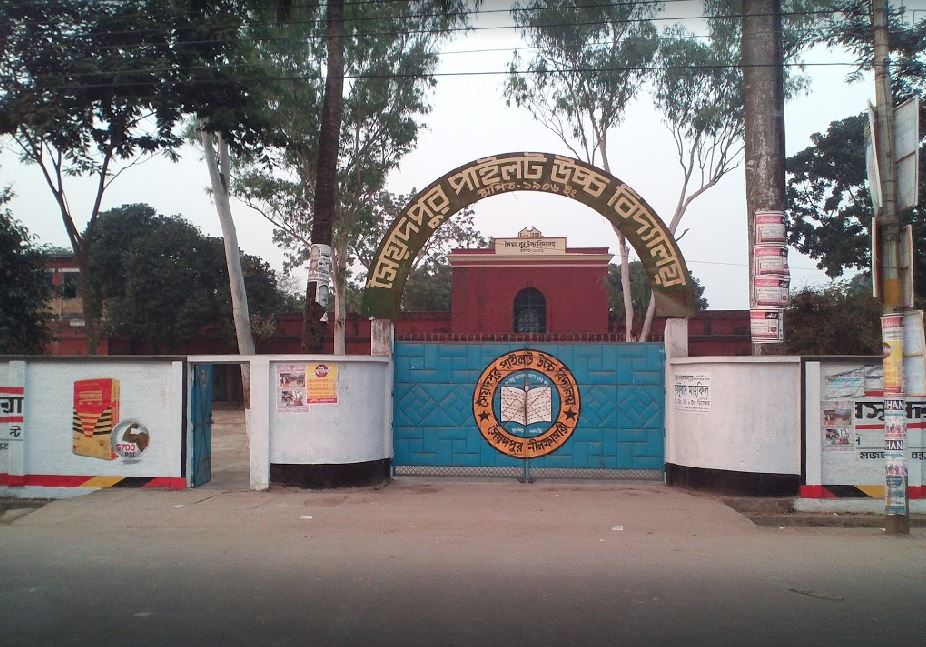
Main Gate

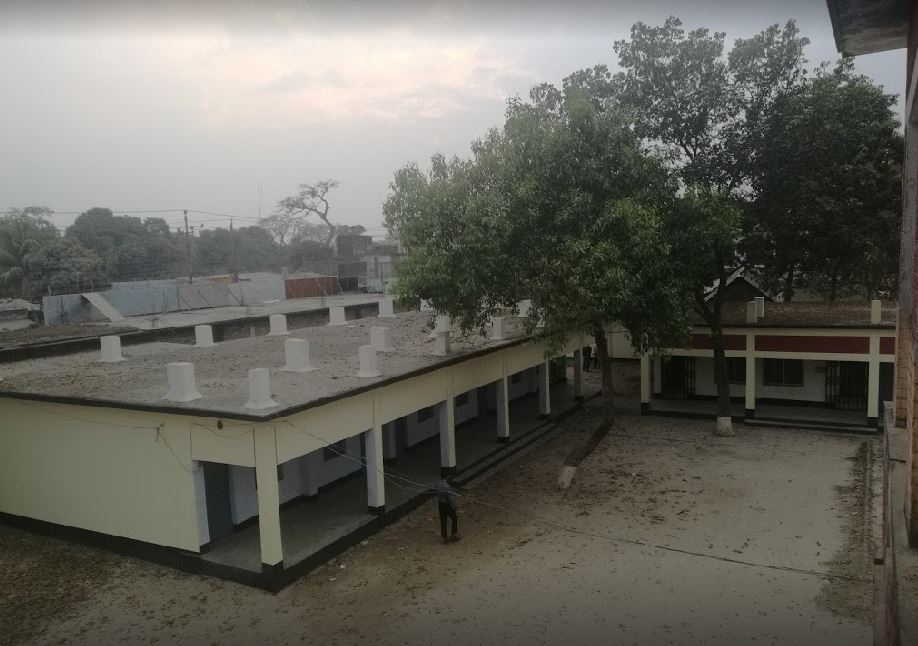
New building

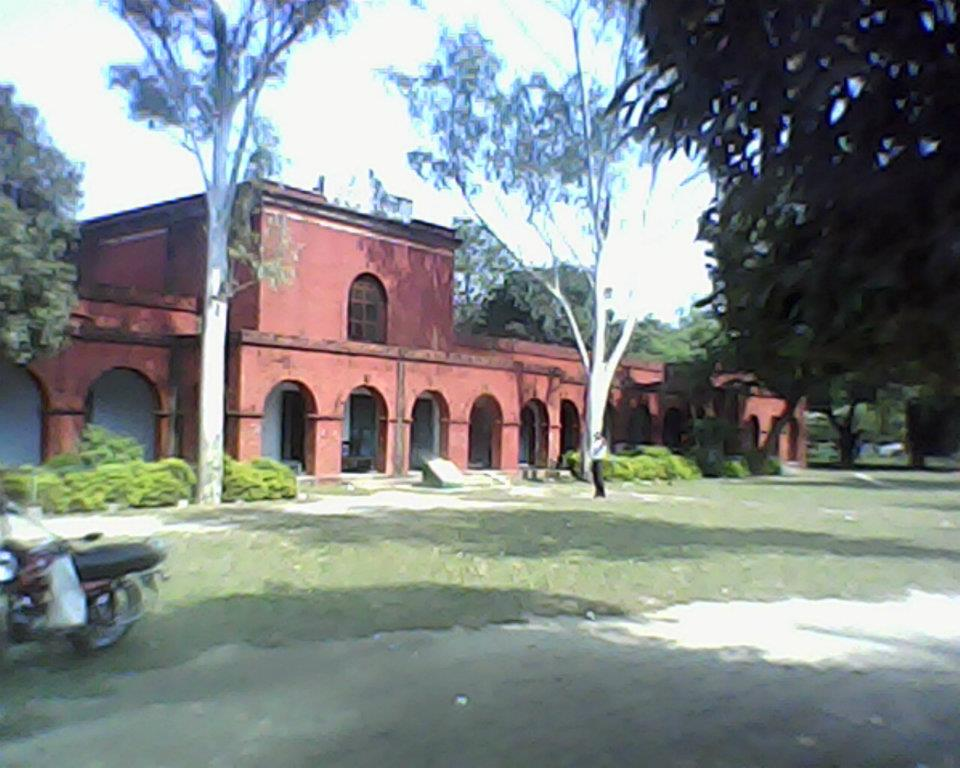
Academic building

== Facilities ==
The school has three academic buildings, an administrative building, and two hostels. There is a big field in the school arena and there's also a basketball court. Other facilities include mosque, workshop, auditorium, canteen, shaheed minar, and library. The school has a laboratories and a computer lab.

== Achievements ==
Among schools under the Board of Intermediate and Secondary Education, Dinajpur, the school ranked first numerous times on Secondary School Certificate (SSC)in examination in British period.
