= Chini Mosque =

Mosque in Saidpur, Rangpur, Bangladesh

- চিনি মসজিদ
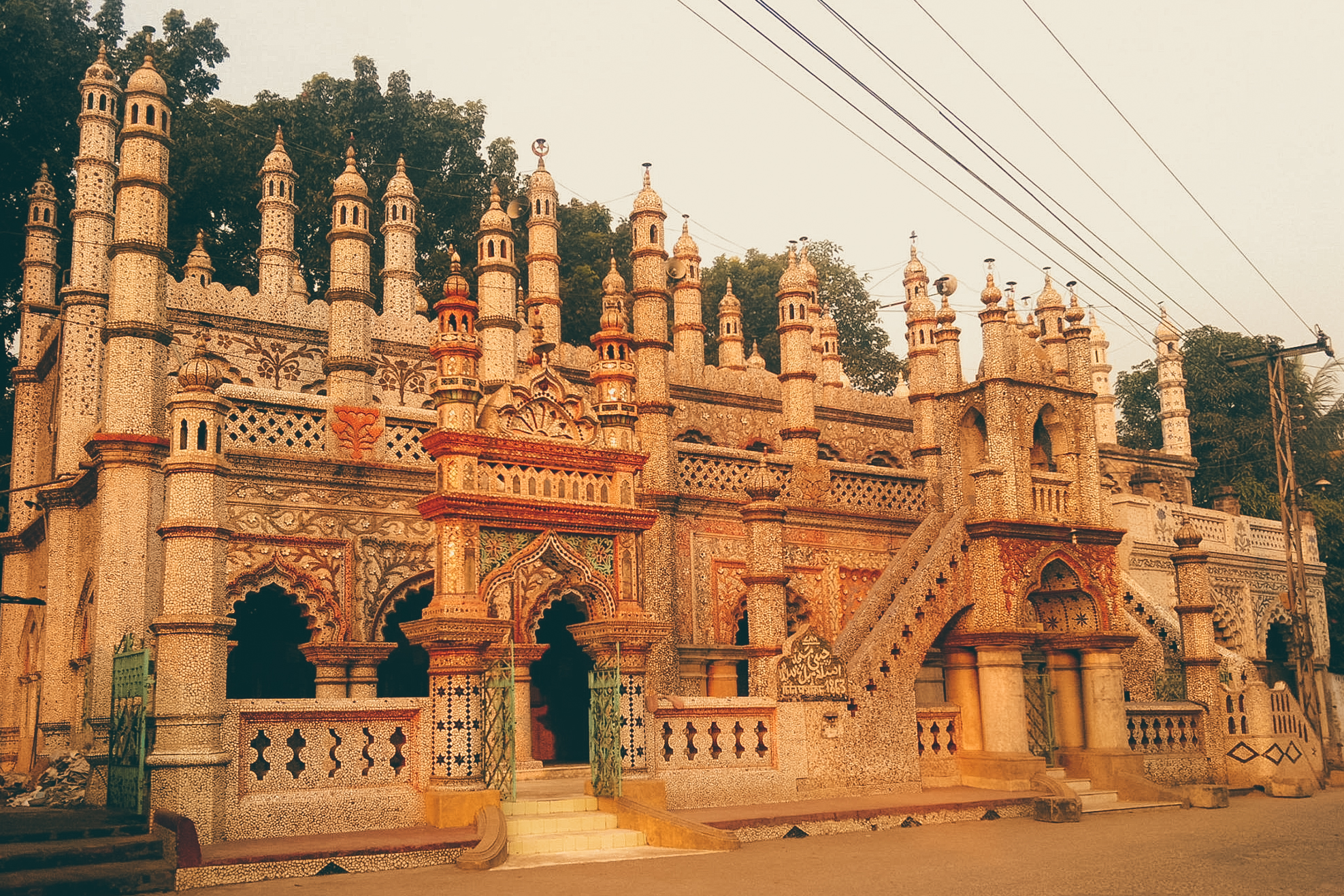

- Location of the mosque in Bangladesh

Religion
- Affiliation: Sunni Islam
- Ecclesiastical or organisational status: Mosque
- Status: Active

Location
- Location: Saidpur, Rangpur, Nilphamari
- Country: Bangladesh
- Coordinates: 25°47′39″N 88°53′25″E

Architecture
- Type: Mosque architecture
- Minaret: 27

The Chini Mosque (Bengali: চিনি মসজিদ; Urdu: چنی مسجد), also known as the Glass Mosque, is a Sunni mosque, located in Saidpur city of Nilphamari district in Rangpur Division of Bangladesh.

== History ==
The construction of the mosque was started in 1863 by Haji Bakir Ali Ahmed and was completed within a year as a little prayer house. Later Wazir Ali Ahmed, a descendant of the founder's family, started the extension and modification work of this mosque. After that, in the middle of the 20th century the sons of the late Wazir Ali Ahmed, Mofizuddin Ahmed and Shafiuddin Ahmed (well known as cloth merchants) continued the beautification work of the mosque. At the time the ceramic pieces were brought from Kolkata as there was no ceramic factory in East Pakistan/Bengal (present Bangladesh).

== Architecture ==
To decorate Chini Masjid, 283 pieces of cross marble stones and 23 tonnes (25 short tons) of small chips of Chinaware-plate and pieces of glass (both color and non-color) porcelain were used. The mosque has 27 minarets, of which five have never been completed.

== Gallery ==
Chini Mosque
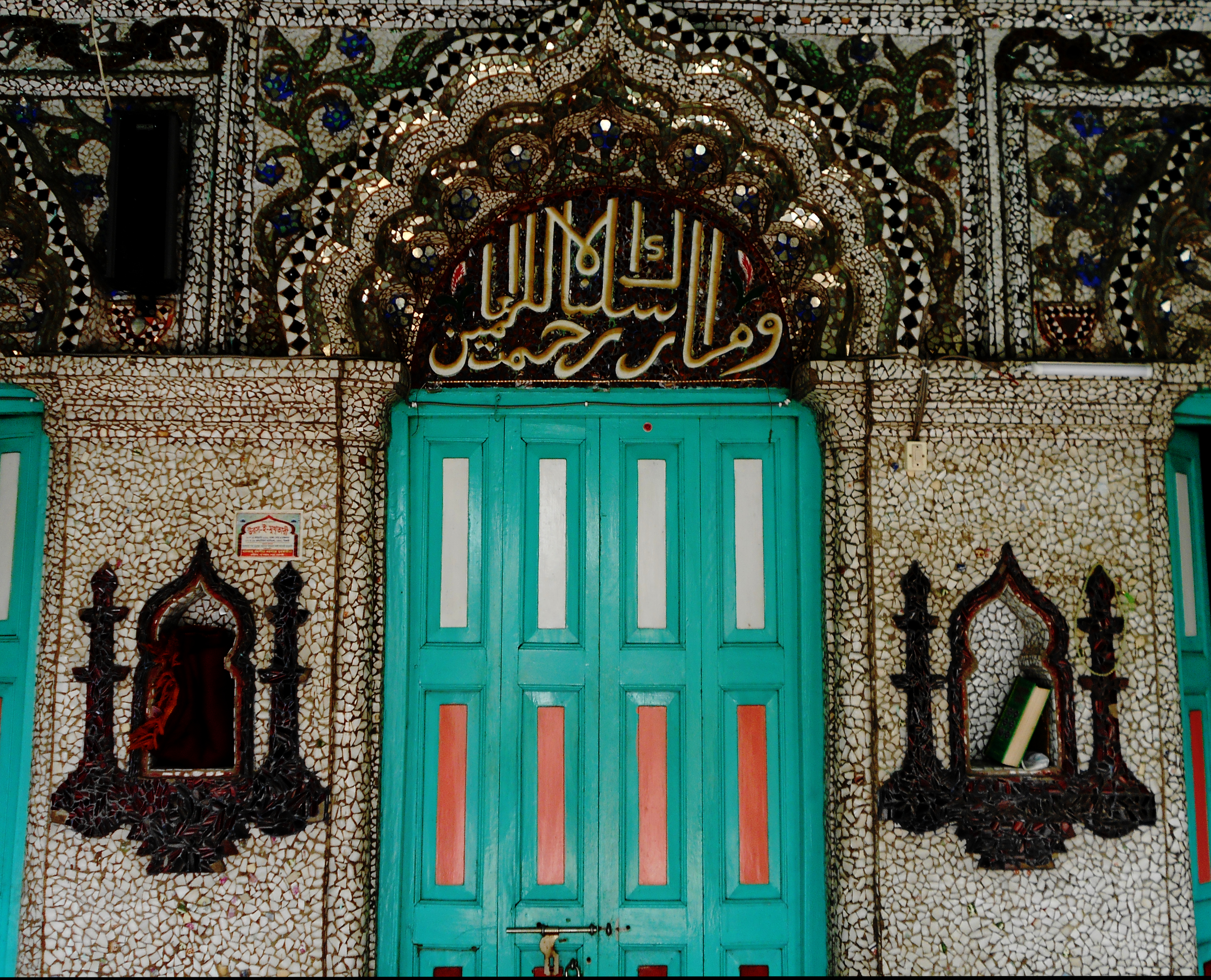
Entrance

== See also ==
- Islam in Bangladesh
- List of mosques in Bangladesh
