= Nilphamari Medical College =

Government medical college in Nilphamari, Bangladesh

- নীলফামারী মেডিকেল কলেজ
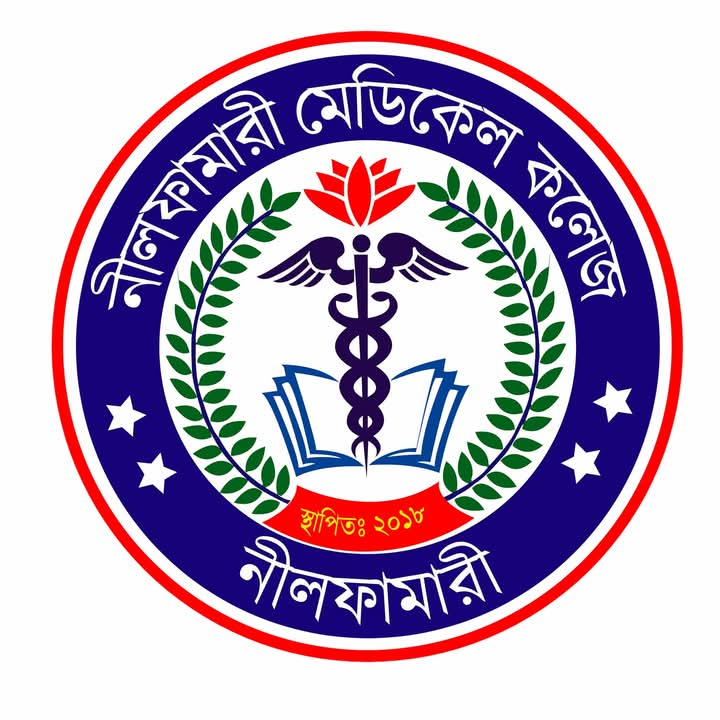
- Other names: NpMC
- Type: Public medical College
- Established: August 30, 2018
- Academic affiliations: Rajshahi Medical University
- Principal: Professor Dr. Jimma Hossain
- Academic staff: 52+
- Students: 289+
- Location: Nilphamari, Rangpur, Bangladesh; 25.966273°N 88.842641°E
- Campus: Urban
- Language: English
- Website: www.facebook.com/nilphamarimedical/

Nilphamari Medical College (NpMC) is a government medical college located in Nilphamari, Bangladesh. It was established on 30 August 2018. The college is affiliated with Rajshahi Medical University.

It offers a five-years medical education course leading to an MBBS degree. A one-year internship after graduation is compulsory for all graduates. The degree is recognized by the Bangladesh Medical and Dental Council.

The college is associated with the 250-bed Adhunik Sadar Hospital, Nilphamari.

== History ==
On 26 August 2018, the government approved four new medical colleges, including Nilphamari Medical College. Although the approval was given on 26 August, Nilphamari Medical College received full approval on 30 August. After the approval, the process of establishing the college began, and on 22 September 2018, Associate Professor Md. Robiul Islam Shah of Khulna Medical College was appointed as the principal of the college. On 15 October 2018, admission for the first batch began. In the 2018–2019 academic session, 48 students were admitted to the college. On 10 February 2019, the then Minister of Cultural Affairs, Asaduzzaman Noor, officially inaugurated the temporary campus of the college at the newly constructed building of Nilphamari Diabetic Hospital. Later, on 1 September 2024, the then principal, Professor Dr. Abu Raihan Md. Suja-Ud-Daula, inaugurated the present campus of Nilphamari Medical College, located 7 kilometers north of Nilphamari town, at Notkhana on the east of the Nilphamari–Domar road beside the Leprosy Hospital.

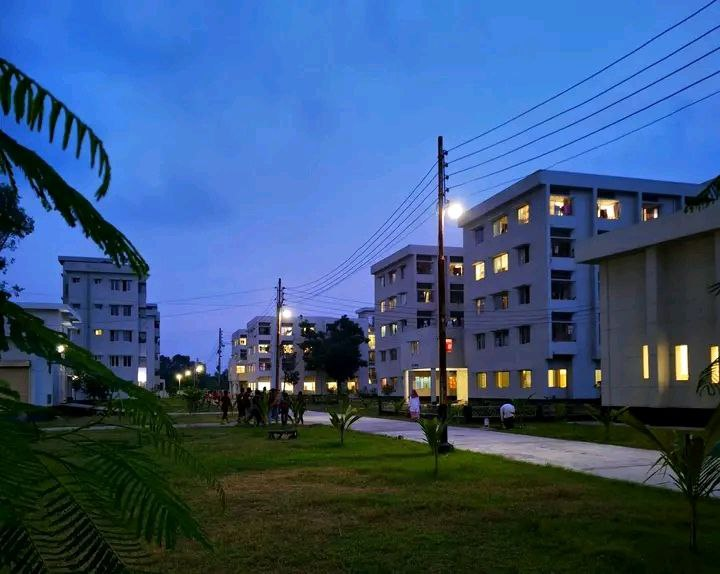

== Campus ==
The present campus of Nilphamari Medical College is located 7 kilometers north of Nilphamari town, at Notkhana on the east of the Nilphamari–Domar road beside the Leprosy Hospital.

== Organization ==
•Sandhani

•Cultural club

== Academics ==
The college offers a five-years course of study, approved by the Bangladesh Medical and Dental Council (BMDC), leading to a Bachelor of Medicine, Bachelor of Surgery (MBBS) degree from Rajshahi Medical University. After passing the final professional examination, there is a compulsory one-year internship. The internship is a prerequisite for obtaining registration from the BMDC to practice medicine.

Admission for Bangladeshis to the MBBS course at all medical colleges in Bangladesh is controlled centrally by the Directorate General of Health Services (DGHS). It administers an annual, written, multiple choice question admission exam simultaneously across the country. It sets prerequisites for who can take the exam, and sets a minimum pass level. DGHS has varied the admission rules over the years, but historically candidates have been admitted based primarily on their score on this test. Grades at the Secondary School Certificate (SSC) and Higher Secondary School Certificate (HSC) level have also been a factor, as part of a combined score or as a prerequisite for taking the exam. DGHS also admits candidates to fill quotas: freedom fighters' descendants, tribal and others. As of 2023-24 session, the college is allowed to admit 75 students annually.

== See also ==
- List of medical colleges in Bangladesh
