= Sunflower School and College =

Bangladeshi College

Coordinates: 25.7842°N 88.9017°E

Sunflower School And College is a higher secondary school in the town of Saidpur in Saidpur Upazila of Nilphamari District, Bangladesh. It was established in 1991. It operates under the Dinajpur Education Board. Later in 2005 the governing body of the school and college decided to take this school to a standard which would be recognized nationally and able to provide a quality education as like international standard. So they invite Lions Clubs International to assist them. So as the procedures required, the governing body found a Lions Club named "Lions Club of Saidpur Sunflower" under Lions Clubs International-315A2, Bangladesh. than in 2006 the Saidpur Sunflower Lions Club took over the control of school authority as lions club's permanent project. Since then the lions club of saidpur sunflower runs the institute successfully and developing very fast day by day...

== Address ==
Kayanizpara, Saidpur-5310, Nilphamari, Bangladesh.
