= Saidpur, Bangladesh =

City in Nilphamari, Rangpur Division, Bangladesh

Saidpur সৈয়দপুর
- City
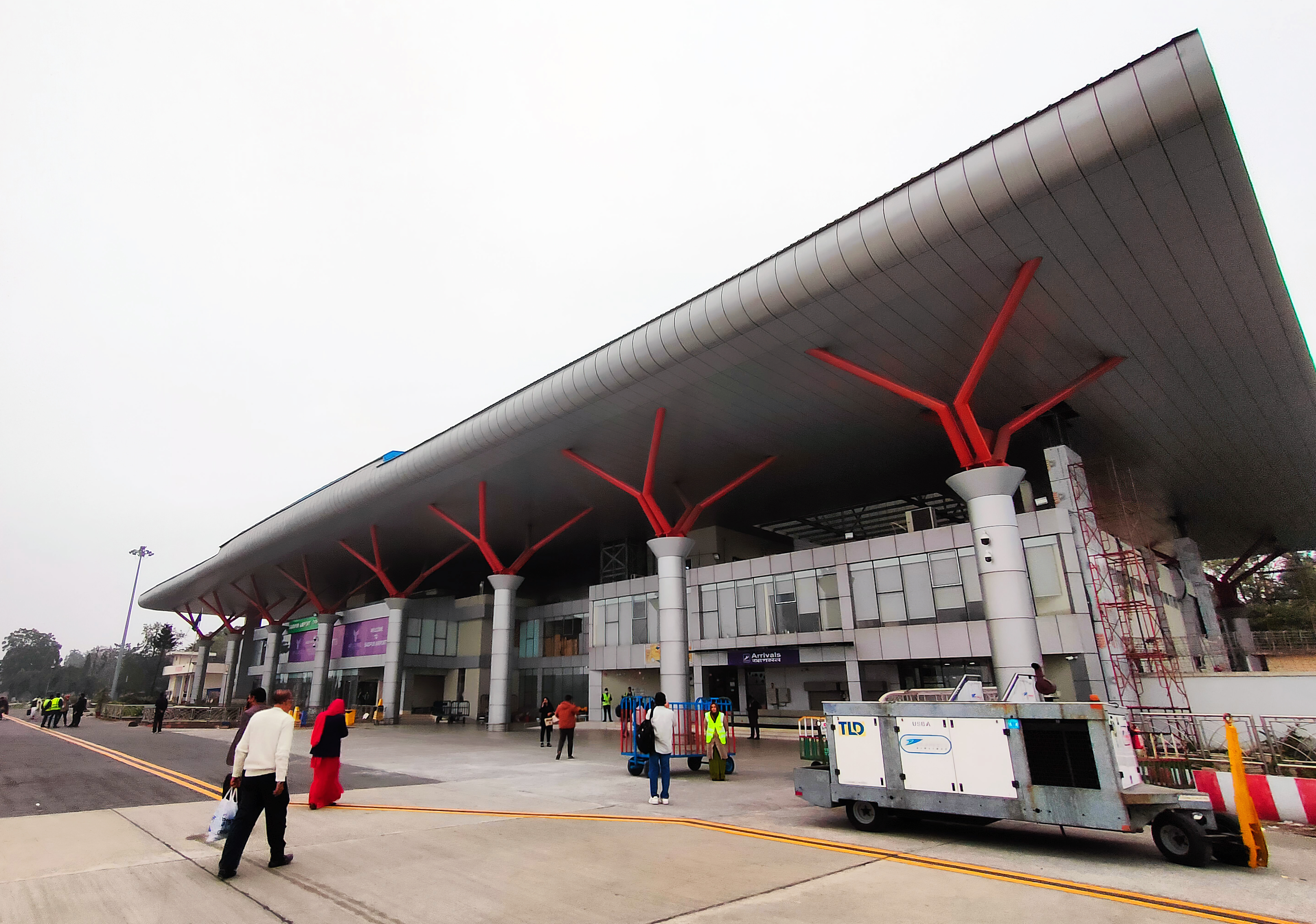
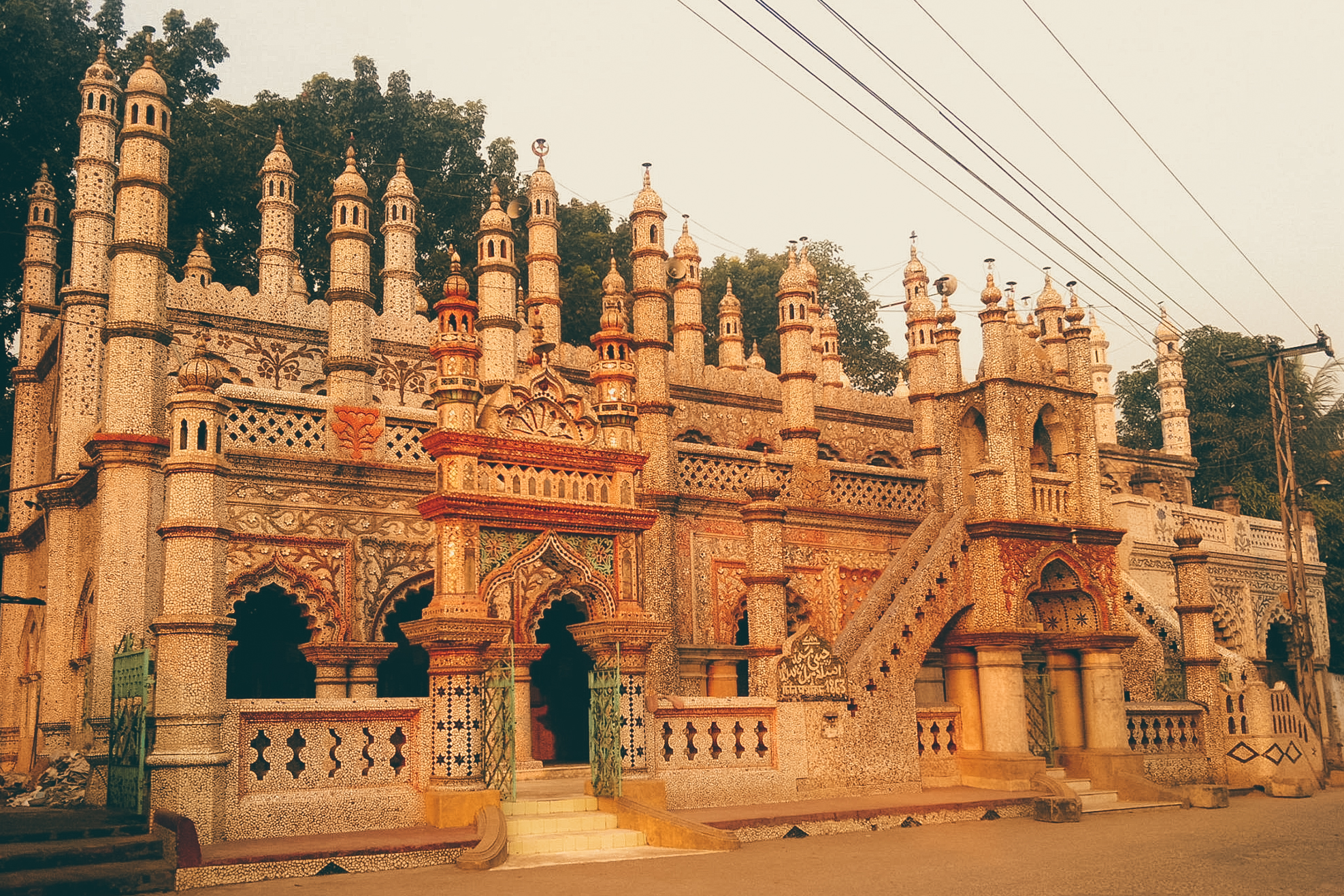
- From top : Saidpur Airport, Chini Mosque, Saidpur railway workshop

- Location of Saidpur City in Rangpur Division Location in Bangladesh
- Coordinates: 25°46′41″N 88°53′51″E
- Country: Bangladesh
- Division: Rangpur Division
- District: Nilphamari
- Upazila: Saidpur
- Incorporated: 1958

Government
  - Type: Mayor-Council government
  - Chief Executive Officer: Md Nur-E-Alam Siddiqi

Area
  - Total: 34.82 km^{2} (13.44 sq mi)
- Elevation: 36 m (118 ft)

Population (2011)
  - Total: 127,104
  - Density: 3,650/km^{2} (9,454/sq mi)
- Time zone: UTC+06:00 (BST)
- Postal code: 5310
- Website: syedpur.nilphamari.gov.bd

Saidpur (Bengali: সৈয়দপুর) is a city of Nilphamari district in Rangpur Division of Bangladesh. Around 144,000 people live here which makes this city the largest in Nilphamari District and 33rd largest city in Bangladesh. The city has become a very important communication hub for adjoining major district headquarters. Saidpur Airport is one of the domestic airports in Bangladesh. The Syedpur Railway Workshop, established in 1870, is the largest in Bangladesh and was the major railway workshop for Assam-Bengal railway. Historically, the city has a large Urdu-speaking community with close ties to Bihar.

== History ==
The city of Saidpur was established around the Saidpur Railway Workshop, established in 1870 by the British Colonial regime. Nothing is known about the origin of the upazila's name. It is learned that in the long past there came a Syed family from Koch Bihar of India and settled in this area and started preaching Islam. It is generally believed that the Upazila might have derived its name, Saidpur, from the name of that Syed family. Saidpur became Thana in 1915.

== Administration ==
The municipality of Saidpur was incorporated in 1958. The city is divided into 15 wards and 43 mahallas. A municipality mayor is elected every 5 years.

== Demographics ==
Religions in Saidpur Paurashava (2022)
| Religion | Percent |
| Muslims | 96.24% |
| Hindus | 3.59% |
| Other or not stated | 0.17% |

According to the 2022 Bangladesh census, Saidpur Paurashava had 33,121 households and a population of 143,538. Saidpur had a literacy rate of 74.07%: 76.30% for males and 71.82% for females, and a sex ratio of 100.88 males per 100 females. 8.78% of the population was under 5 years of age.

The city has a population of 127,104 in 26,333 households. Saidpur has a sex ratio of 953 females to 1000 males and a literacy rate of 63.9%.

== Economy ==
The city is the commercial hub for the surrounding districts. The biggest railway workshop of Bangladesh is here. Some have stated that "the city never sleeps" and it is also known as the "city of night". Business always runs here night and day. The city centre has many government and private banks, insurance companies, residential hotels, Chinese and Indian restaurants, fast food, sweet shops, gift shops, and many more. It is an important economic zone in Bangladesh. Recently local businessmen have invested in the ready-made garments sector, and they have succeeded in capturing a good market position in India, Nepal, Bhutan. With the help and initiative taken by the SME Foundation, these garments are now exporting their goods in Europe, United States, etc. Some medium and heavy industries are growing here, especially the agricultural industry, crockery, organic fertilizer, oil from recycled tires, light metal industry, etc. There are also some good markets and shopping malls here.

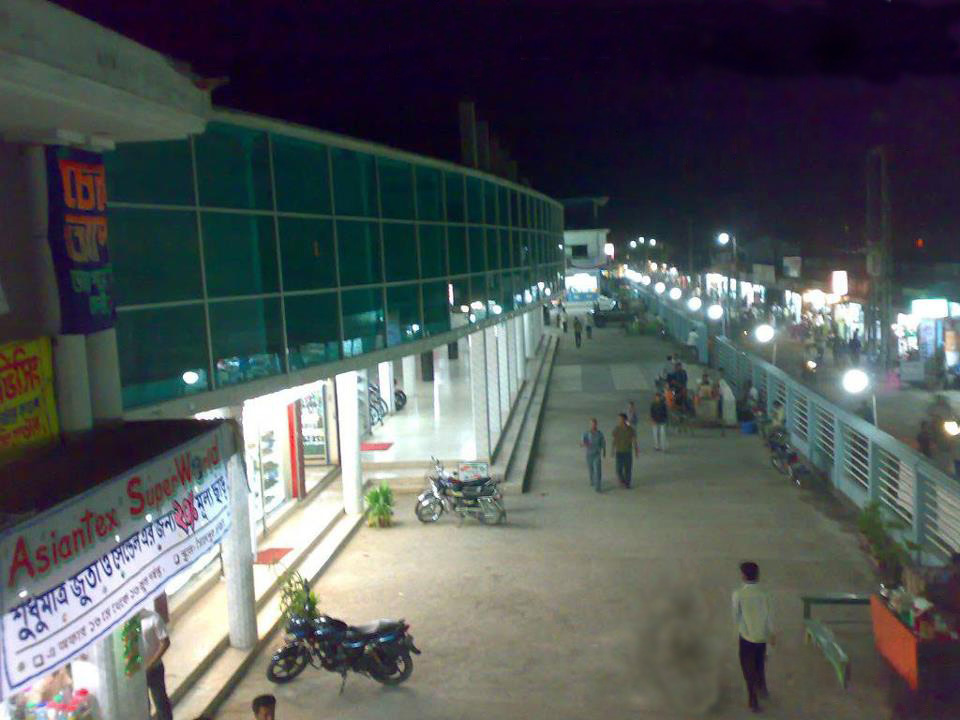
Syedpur Plaza, a shopping mall in Syedpur

== Culture ==
Notable historical or cultural monuments are Chini Mosque (1863) at Islambagh, Nat Settlement Prison (1871) at Natun Babu Para, Martuza Institute (1882) near Saidpur railway station, Saidpur Church (1893), Christian Church of Bangladesh (1906). The city has an officers' club and two other clubs and institutes where the city's various dramas and musicals take place. There is also a 150(appx.)-a year-old cultural club called Silpo Sahitto Shongshod. Every year people celebrate Eid al-Fitr, Eid-al-Adha, Bengali New Year (Pohela Baishakh), English New Year, etc. with enthusiasm and festiveness. Nightlife in this city is very festive; the city markets hardly sleep at night.

=== Language ===
The official and academic language of the city is Modern Standard Bengali that serves as the lingua franca of the nation, with 98% of Bangladeshis being fluent in Bengali as their first language. However, Bangali community in the city use Rangpuri or Rangpurya dialect, especially the pronunciation of /r/ replaced by /O/ i.e. "অক্ত" instead of "রক্ত" meaning blood in Bengali.

All the Bihari people in the city use Hindi–Urdu as their mother tongue which is noticeable and influential in this city of Bangladesh, where Biharis form around half the population. The language dialect of the non-Bengali-speaking people of the region is slightly different from the modern standard Urdu or Hindi language trending toward Bihari languages. In some traditional wedding of non-Bengali origin, women sing folk songs in Bihari languages particularly in Bhojpuri, Magahi, Awadhi and Maithili. Bihari Hindu people in Saidpur use mostly Bhojpuri among themselves. The use of Urdu may be noticeable in some parts of the market, in local announcements, Urdu musaharati Na'at during Ramadan sehri and Mushaira programs. However, these Hindustani languages are not constitutionally recognized official languages in Bangladesh as for other minority ethnic groups in Bangladesh.

== Geography and climate ==
Saidpur is located in the Rangpur Division at Northern Bangladesh. The elevation of Saidpur is 40 meters. Most of the city and its surrounding area is made of Alluvium Flood plain. The river Khrkharia flows near the city.

The city of Saidpur has a monsoon influenced Humid subtropical climate (Cwa). There are four seasons in Saidpur- A hot and Humid Summer (March–May), rainy and severe monsoon season (June–September), Short and relatively dry Autumn or post Monsoon season (October–November) and a mild, pleasant Winter (December–February).

Climate data for Saidpur (1991–2020, extremes 1980-present)
| Month | Jan | Feb | Mar | Apr | May | Jun | Jul | Aug | Sep | Oct | Nov | Dec | Year |
|---|---|---|---|---|---|---|---|---|---|---|---|---|---|
| Record high °C (°F) | 29.4 (84.9) | 34.4 (93.9) | 38.8 (101.8) | 42.5 (108.5) | 41.2 (106.2) | 40.0 (104.0) | 39.1 (102.4) | 39.0 (102.2) | 39.0 (102.2) | 37.2 (99.0) | 33.4 (92.1) | 30.6 (87.1) | 42.5 (108.5) |
| Mean daily maximum °C (°F) | 22.9 (73.2) | 26.7 (80.1) | 30.8 (87.4) | 32.3 (90.1) | 32.5 (90.5) | 32.6 (90.7) | 32.3 (90.1) | 32.8 (91.0) | 32.3 (90.1) | 31.4 (88.5) | 29.1 (84.4) | 25.2 (77.4) | 30.1 (86.2) |
| Daily mean °C (°F) | 16.2 (61.2) | 20.0 (68.0) | 24.1 (75.4) | 26.5 (79.7) | 27.9 (82.2) | 29.0 (84.2) | 29.2 (84.6) | 29.4 (84.9) | 28.7 (83.7) | 26.7 (80.1) | 22.5 (72.5) | 18.3 (64.9) | 24.9 (76.8) |
| Mean daily minimum °C (°F) | 10.6 (51.1) | 13.6 (56.5) | 17.4 (63.3) | 21.2 (70.2) | 23.3 (73.9) | 25.3 (77.5) | 26.2 (79.2) | 26.3 (79.3) | 25.5 (77.9) | 22.6 (72.7) | 17.2 (63.0) | 12.7 (54.9) | 20.2 (68.3) |
| Record low °C (°F) | 3.0 (37.4) | 6.0 (42.8) | 8.6 (47.5) | 13.7 (56.7) | 17.5 (63.5) | 18.8 (65.8) | 21.7 (71.1) | 20.8 (69.4) | 18.1 (64.6) | 13.2 (55.8) | 9.8 (49.6) | 4.2 (39.6) | 3.0 (37.4) |
| Average precipitation mm (inches) | 9 (0.4) | 8 (0.3) | 25 (1.0) | 91 (3.6) | 244 (9.6) | 411 (16.2) | 412 (16.2) | 344 (13.5) | 387 (15.2) | 149 (5.9) | 7 (0.3) | 5 (0.2) | 2,092 (82.4) |
| Average precipitation days (≥ 1 mm) | 1 | 1 | 2 | 6 | 13 | 18 | 18 | 16 | 15 | 6 | 1 | 1 | 98 |
| Average relative humidity (%) | 78 | 70 | 63 | 70 | 77 | 82 | 83 | 83 | 83 | 80 | 75 | 76 | 77 |
| Mean monthly sunshine hours | 177.1 | 206.5 | 245.8 | 210.5 | 202.4 | 156.7 | 160.3 | 169.7 | 169.4 | 231.3 | 226.3 | 200.4 | 2,356.4 |
Source 1: NOAA
Source 2: Bangladesh Meteorological Department (humidity 1981-2010)

== Education ==
The city is famous for its educational institutions. Some renowned institutions of this city are Saidpur Govt. Science College, Bangladesh Railway Govt. School, Saidpur Cantonment Public School and College, Lions school and college, Saidpur, Sunflower School and College, Al-Faruque Academy, Saidpur Government College, Saidpur Adarsha Girls School and College, Cantonment Board High School, Saidpur, International School, Saidpur. Besides those, there are 9 more colleges and more than 50 secondary and primary schools in the city. The city has three colleges that offer undergraduate and degree courses under Bangladesh National University. In recent, four or five schools, as well as colleges, become top on the merit list of Board of Intermediate and Secondary Education, Dinajpur. It has one of the major university co-ordinated by Bangladesh Army named Bangladesh Army University of Science and Technology (BAUST).

== Transport ==
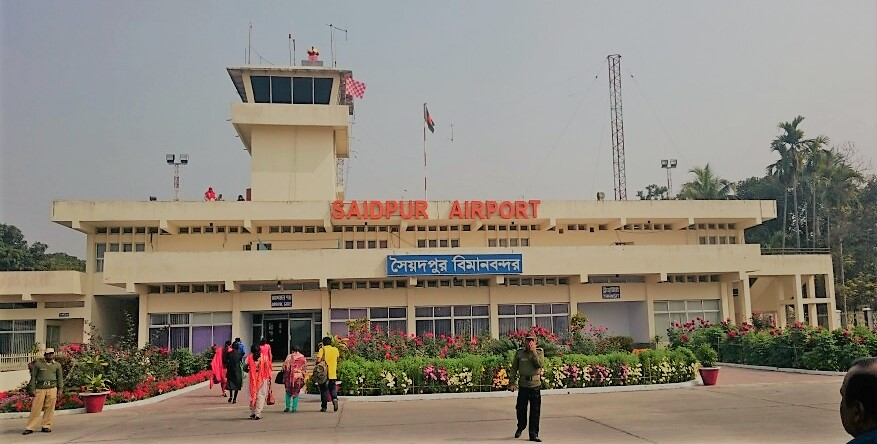
Saidpur Airport

The city is well connected to the country's major cities by railway, bus highways, and airways. Saidpur Airport is the only airport in Rangpur Division. The services of Biman Bangladesh, Regent Airways, and Novoair are available on Saidpur Airport. There are many intercity train services from Saidpur to the capital city Dhaka, Rajshahi, Khulna and other divisions every day. The Nilshagor Express enhanced train transportation. There are more than 650 buses from Saidpur to Dhaka or Chittagong or other big cities. It is a very important commercial city of Bangladesh.

== Sports ==
There are two big sports stadiums and playgrounds are available to meet the city's sports-loving people. Many divisional and district level cricket, football, festival sports take place during the year.

== See also ==
- Upazilas of Bangladesh
- Districts of Bangladesh
- Divisions of Bangladesh
- Upazila
- Thana
