= Saidpur railway workshop =

Railway workshop in Nilphamari, Bangladesh

Coordinates: 25.791°N 88.888°E

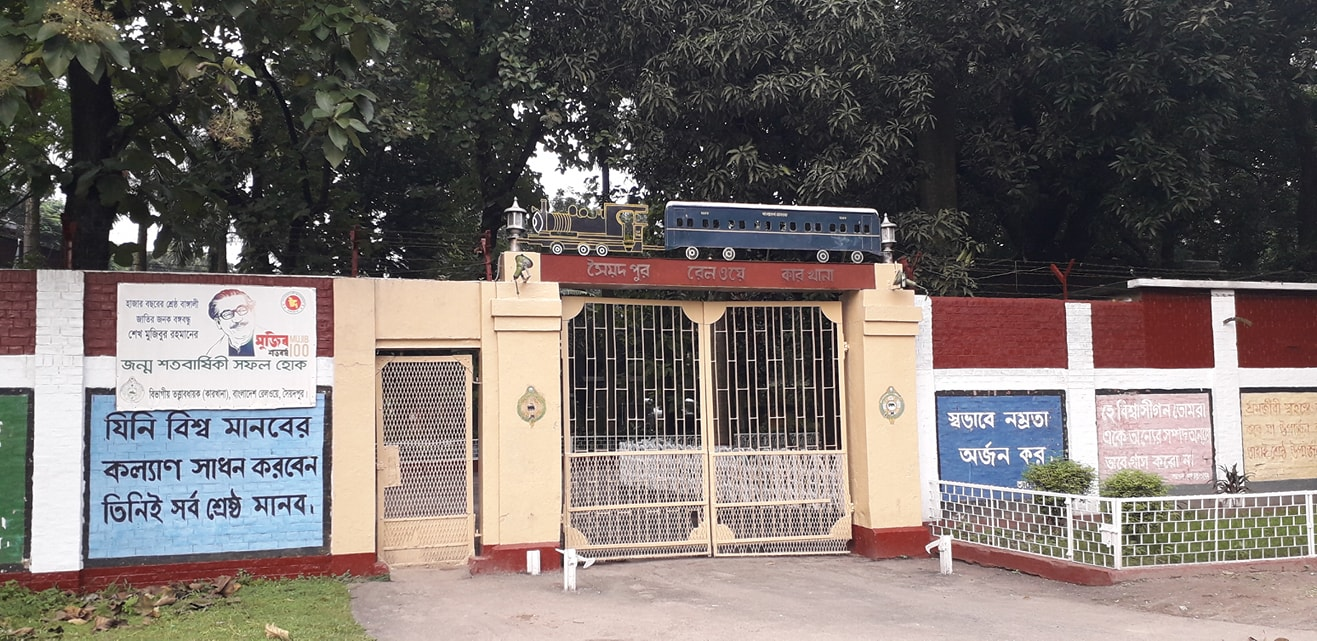
- Entrance of Saidpur railway workshop in 2020
- Native name: সৈয়দপুর রেলওয়ে কারখানা
- Company type: Public
- Industry: Railway
- Founded: 1870; 155 years ago
- Headquarters: Saidpur, Nilphamari District, Bangladesh
- Services: Maintenance, repair and operations
- Owner: Bangladesh Railway
- Number of employees: 2825

Saidpur railway workshop is a railway workshop in Bangladesh situated at Saidpur, Nilphamari District and operated by Bangladesh Railway. It is one of the two railway workshops in Bangladesh (the other being Pahartali railway workshop in Chittagong) where maintenance and repair of railway coaches and wagons are done. It is also the largest railway workshop of the country.

== Details ==
In 1870, Saidpur railway workshop was established as a meter-gauge steam locomotive repair shed on a 110-acre land. Later, with the installation of plants and machines to repair meter-gauge and broad-gauge coaches and wagons, the workshop became fully equipped in 1953 at 800 acres of land. There are 25 different shops where repair work is done and around 1,200 items of spare parts and tools for carriage and wagon are manufactured.
