= Saidpur Government College =

Coordinates: 25.7754°N 88.8839°E

- সৈয়দপুর সরকারি কলেজ
- Type: Official
- Established: 1953
- Affiliations: Dinajpur Board, National University, Bangladesh Open University
- Faculty: 80+
- Students: 2,000+
- Location: Saidpur, Nilphamari District, 5310, Bangladesh
- Campus: Urban (Bangla-bazar, kundol)

Saidpur Government College, Saidpur, Nilphamari (Bengali: সৈয়দপুর সরকারি কলেজ) is an honors-level degree college organised by the National University and the Dinajpur Board of Intermediate and Secondary Education. Established in 1953 under the name "Kay-A-De Azam", the college was the first to open in both the city of Saidpur and Nilphamari District, and was renamed as "Saidpur Government College" in 2018. Saidpur's central Shaheed Minar is located on its campus.

== Courses ==
- Intermediate level (H.S.C)
- Four-years Honor's course
- Degree Pass course
- Open university (H.S.C, Degree pass course, Four-year Honor's course)
- Syllabus: National Curriculum and Textbook Board In Bengali.
