= Kundapukur Union =

Kundapukur Union কুন্দপুকুর ইউনিয়ন
- Union
- Kundapukur Union
- Country: Bangladesh
- Division: Rangpur
- District: Nilphamari
- Upazila: Nilphamari Sadar

Area
  - Total: 35.55 km^{2} (13.73 sq mi)

Population (2011)
  - Total: 22,775
  - Density: 640.6/km^{2} (1,659/sq mi)
- Time zone: UTC+6 (BST)
- Website: kundapukur.nilphamari.gov.bd

Kundapukur Union (Bengali: কুন্দপুকুর ইউনিয়ন) is a union parishad situated at Nilphamari Sadar Upazila, in Nilphamari District, Rangpur Division of Bangladesh. The union has an area of 35.55 square kilometres (13.73 sq mi) and as of 2001 had a population of 22,775. There are 9 villages and 7 mouzas in the union.
