= Nilphamari Government High School =

- নীলফামারী সরকারী উচ্চ বিদ্যালয়
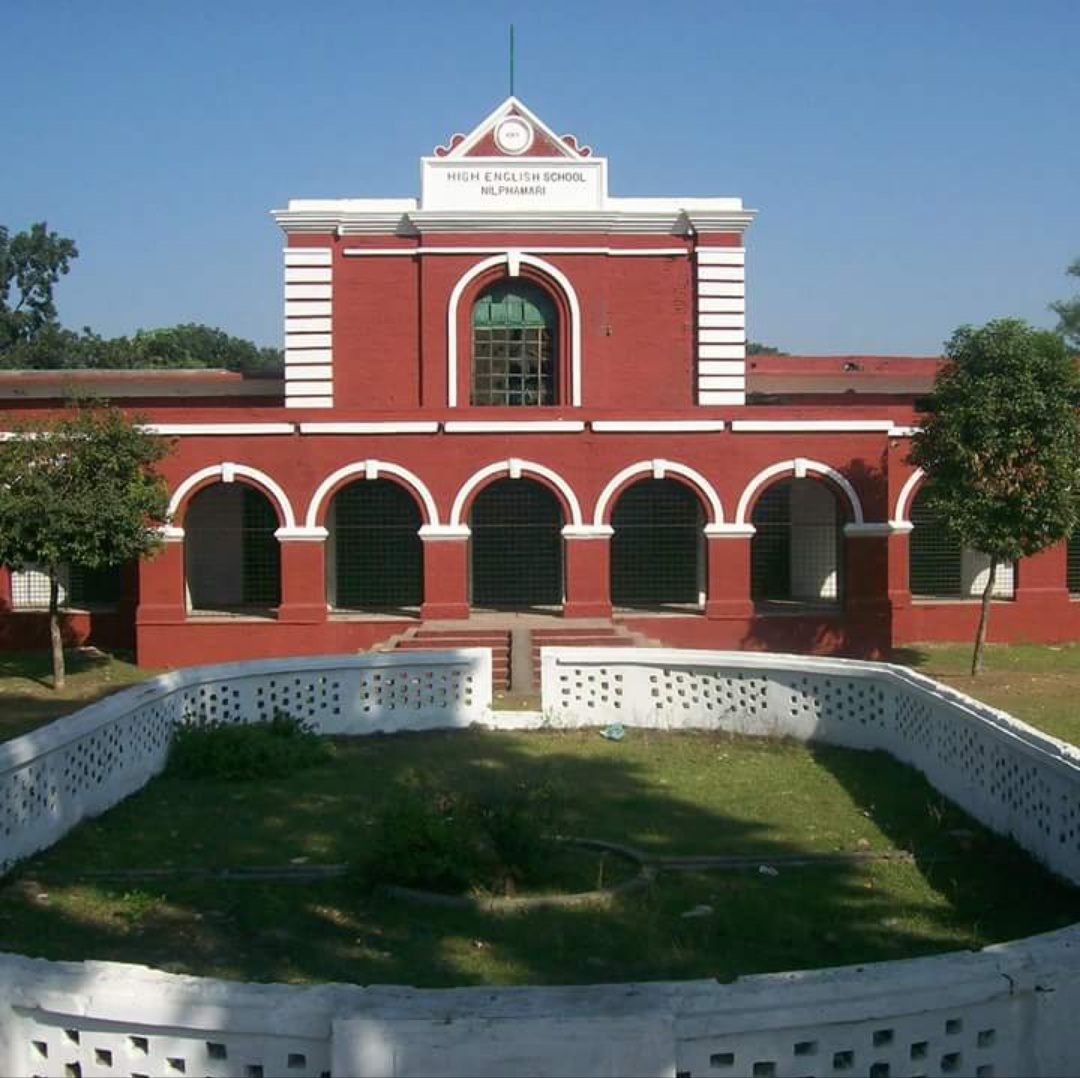

Location
- P T I Road; Nilphamari Sadar, Nilphamari, 5300; Bangladesh; 25.935583°N 88.854514°E

Information
- Type: Government high school
- Motto: Bengali: শিক্ষা, স্বাস্থ্য, প্রগতি (Education, Health, Progress)
- Established: 1882
- School board: Board of Intermediate and Secondary Education, Dinajpur
- Head teacher: Nalini Kanto Roy
- Grades: 6–10
- Language: Bengali
- Website: www.nghs1882.edu.bd

Nilphamari Government High School (Bengali: নীলফামারী সরকারী উচ্চ বিদ্যালয়) is a government high school in Nilphamari Sadar, Nilphamari, Bangladesh. It was established in 1882 by the British.
