= Bangladesh Bureau of Educational Information and Statistics =

Research institute in Bangladesh

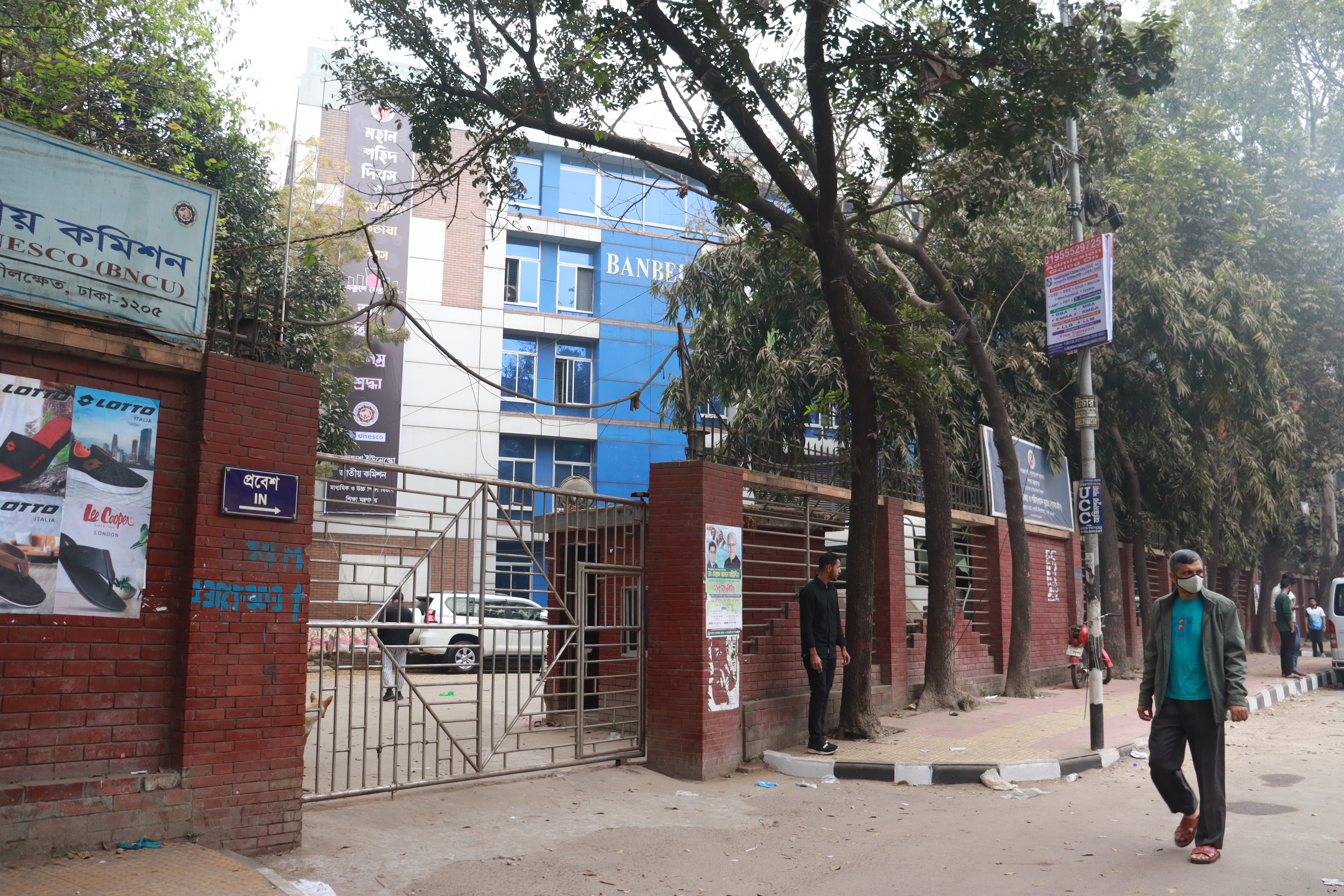
- Formation: 1977
- Headquarters: 1 Sonargaon Road (Palashi-Nilkhet), Dhaka - 1205, Bangladesh
- Coordinates: 23.7286°N 90.3881°E
- Region served: Bangladesh
- Official language: Bengali
- Website: www.banbeis.gov.bd

Bangladesh Bureau of Educational Information and Statistics also known as BANBEIS is the government agency responsible for the collection and dissemination of statistics and information related to education in Bangladesh and is located in Dhaka, Bangladesh.

== History ==
Dr. Muhammad Qudrat-e-Khoda Commission Report in 1974 recommended that the government of Bangladesh form a separate bureau within the Ministry of Education to collection information on education in Bangladesh. The bureau was modelled on the Central Bureau of Education. Bangladesh Bureau of Educational Information and Statistics was established in 1977. It has two wings, the division of statistics and the Documentation, Library & Publication Division. It started out with a rented premises in Dhanmondi but moved to a permanent office in Palashi-Nilkhet road.
