= Rangpur Government College =

Public college in Rangpur, Bangladesh

- রংপুর সরকারি কলেজ
- Type: Public
- Established: July 25, 1963; 63 years ago
- Affiliations: National University; Dinajpur Education Board (HSC)
- Principal: Professor Ferozur Rahman
- Vice Principal: Professor Md. Abu Bakr Siddique
- Academic staff: 77
- Students: 11,345
- Undergraduates: 8,200
- Postgraduates: 455
- Other students: 2,690 (HSC)
- Location: Radaballav, Rangpur, 5404, Bangladesh; 25.7589°N 89.2476°E
- Campus: 6.06 acres (2.45 ha); urban
- Language: Bengali
- Website: rangpur.college.gov.bd

Rangpur Government College (abbreviated as RGC) is a public educational institution in Rangpur, Bangladesh. It was established on July 25, 1963. It is situated in Radaballav, within one kilometer from the town center. Currently, the college offers HSC, graduate (pass) courses, bachelor's (honours) courses in 14 subjects, and postgraduate courses in 7 subjects. According to the 2024 data, a total of 11,375 students are currently studying here.

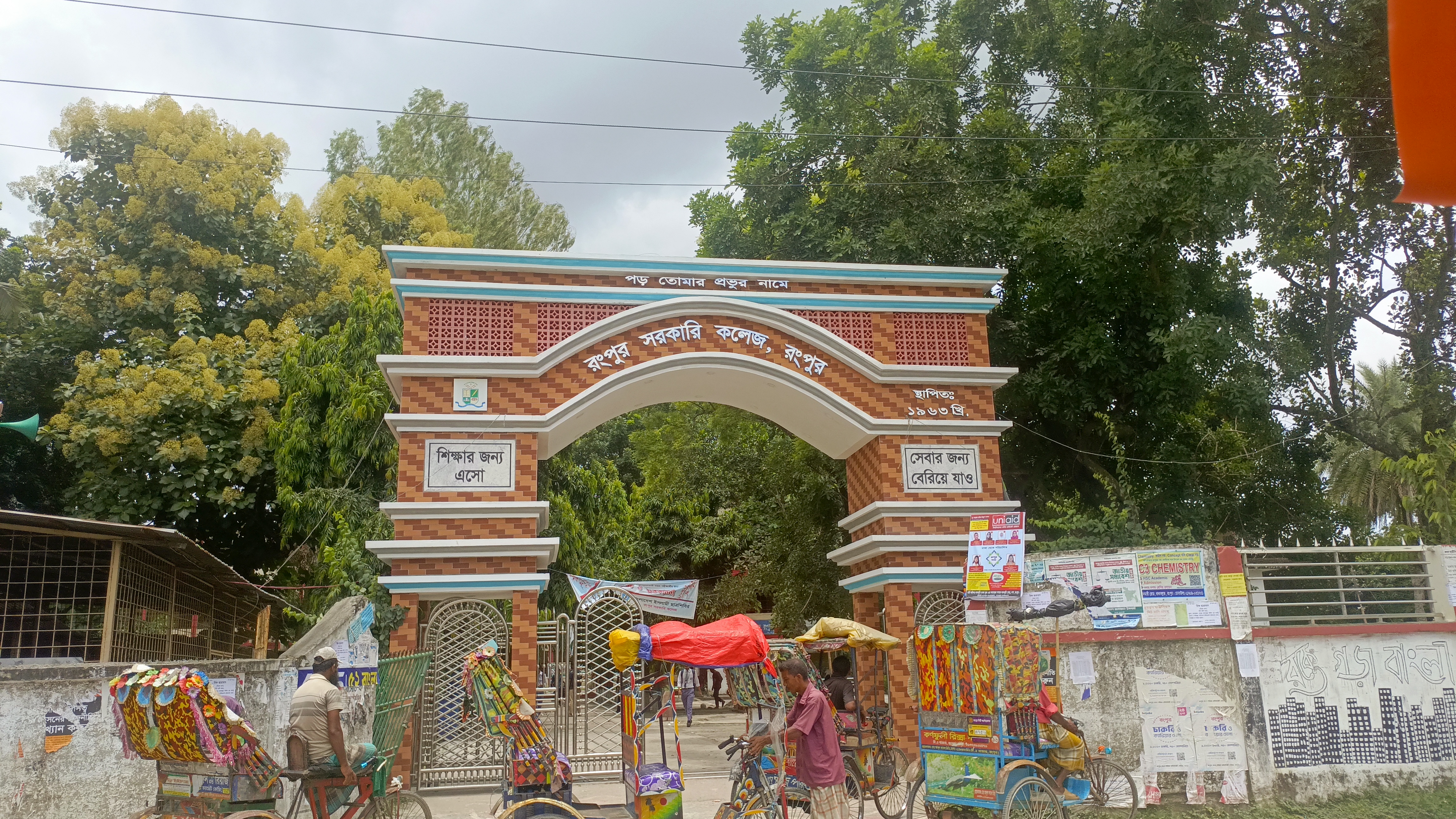
Entrance of Rangpur Government College

== Campus ==
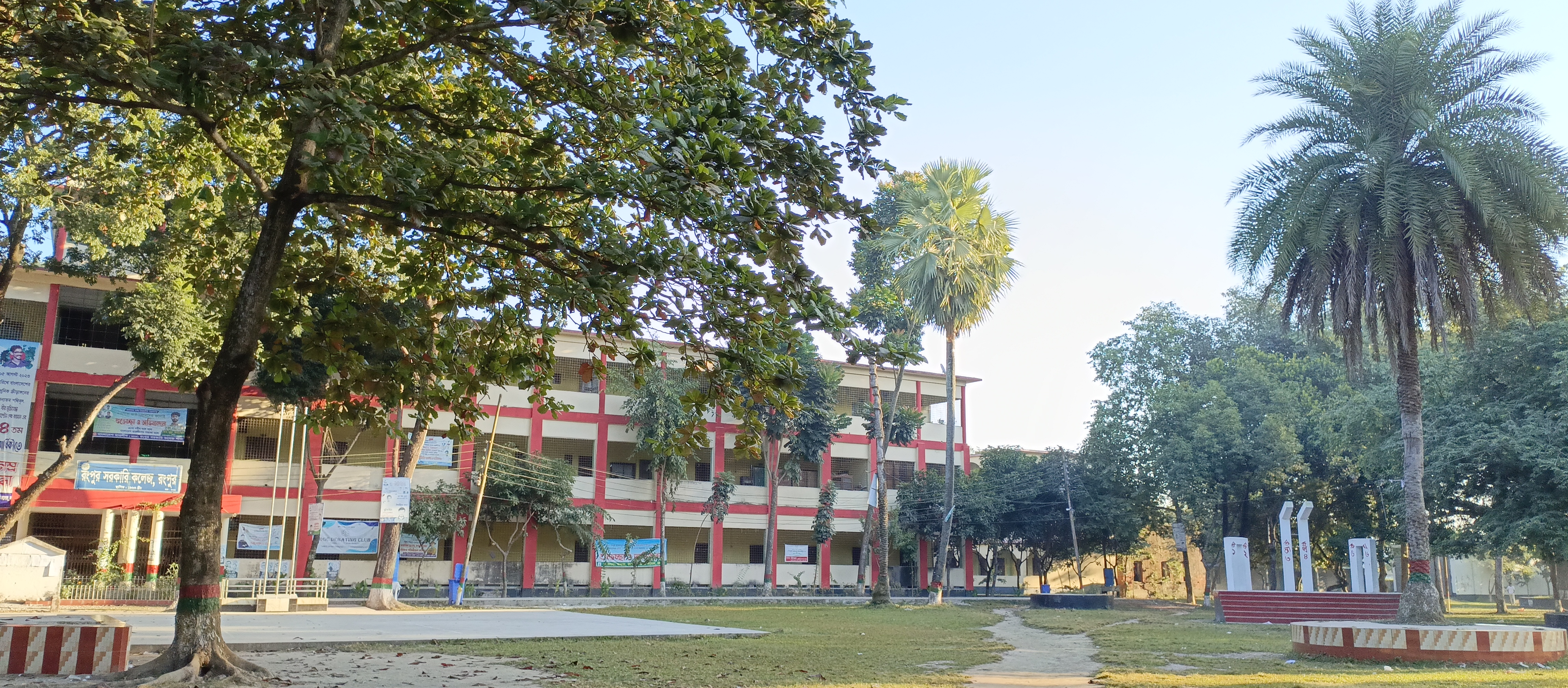
Campus

The college, with its four academic buildings, stands on 5.26 acres of land. It has two hostels for students. The female hostel can accommodate 100 students, while the male hostel, namely Shahid Moslem Uddin Chattrabas, is obsolete now. Some extracurricular activities based student organizations are also functioning on the campus. These are the voluntary blood donation related club Badhon, Debating Club, Science Club, Rover Scout, Bangladesh National Cadet Corps (BNCC), Red Crescent Society, etc.

== Academics ==
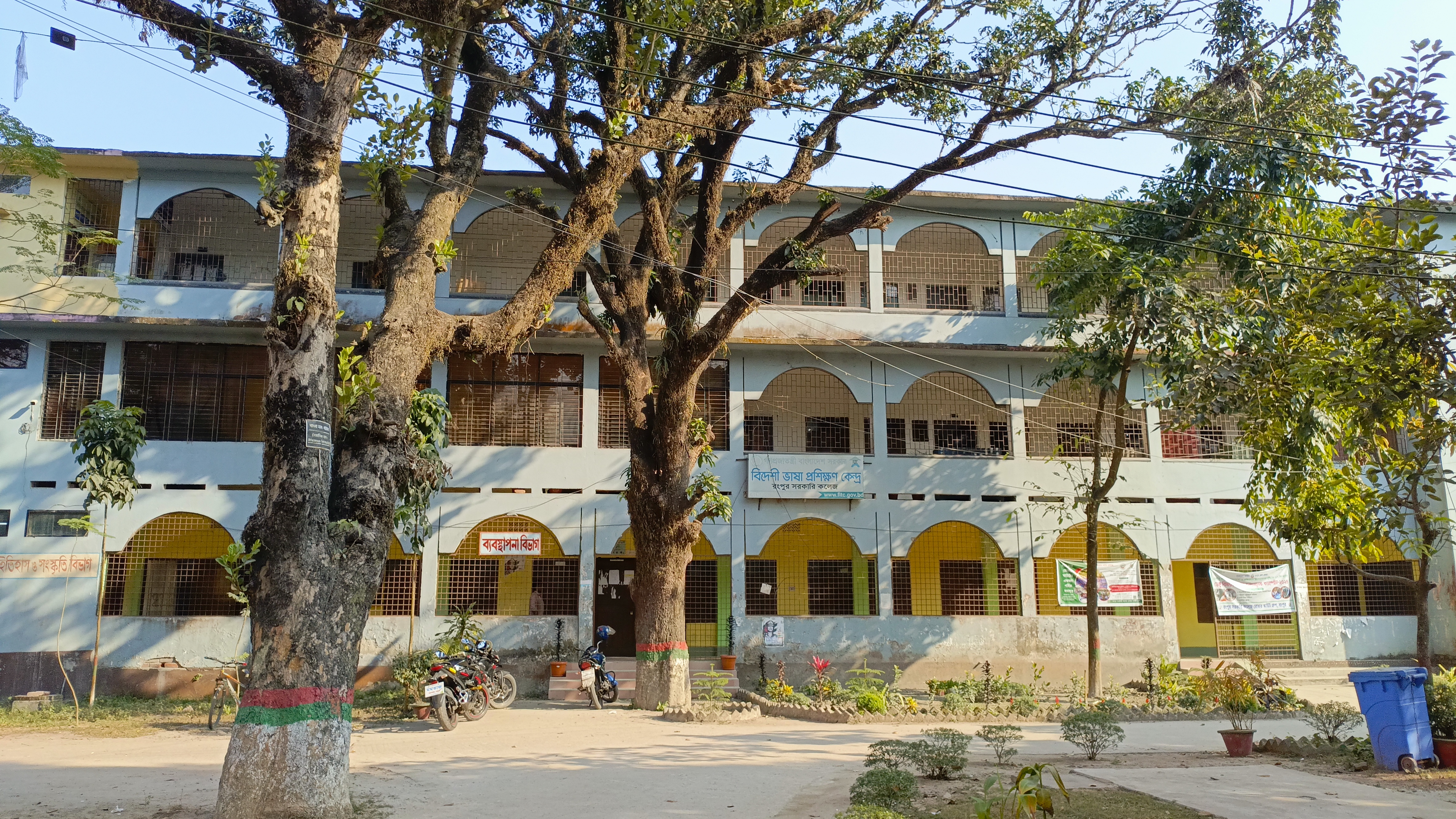
Foreign Language Training Centre, Rangpur Government College

Currently, about 11,375 HSC, honors, and master's level students are enrolled in the college in regular and irregular sessions, 2700 of them being HSC students. The number of teachers is 77. There are three main branches of study in this college: science, arts, and commerce. Fourteen honors level and Seven Master's level subjects are offered in this college.

=== Undergraduate programs ===
- B. A. (Hons. & Pass)
- B. S. S. (Hons. & Pass)
- B. Sc. (Hons. & Pass)
- B. B. S. (Hons. & Pass)

=== Graduate programs ===
- MSc
- M.A.
- M.S.S.
- M.B.A.

=== Faculties and departments ===
RGC has 14 departments under Five faculties.

Faculty	Department
Faculty of Arts	Bangla
Faculty of Arts	English
Faculty of Arts	History
Faculty of Arts	Islamic History and Culture
Faculty of Arts	Philosophy
Faculty of Social Science	Economics
Faculty of Social Science	Political Science
Faculty of Business Studies	Accounting
Faculty of Business Studies	Management
Faculty of Science	Mathematics
Faculty of Science	Physics
Faculty of Science	Chemistry
Faculty of Life and Earth Science	Botany
Faculty of Life and Earth Science	Zoology

== Ranking ==
In 2015, 2016, 2017, and 2018, the National University of Bangladesh ranked it as one of the top ten honours colleges in the Rangpur region.

== Alumni ==
- Khandaker Golam Mostafa (1943–2020) 2nd Jatiya Sangsad member
- K M Abdul Khaleq Chontu (1946–2017) 5th Jatiya Sangsad member
- M. Abul Kashem (born 1953) academic staff of Bangladesh Agricultural University.
- Abu Sayed (c. 2001-2024) student activist.

== See also ==
- Carmichael College
- Begum Rokeya University, Rangpur
