= Nilphamari =

City in Rangpur, Bangladesh

Nilphamari নীলফামারী
- City and Municipality
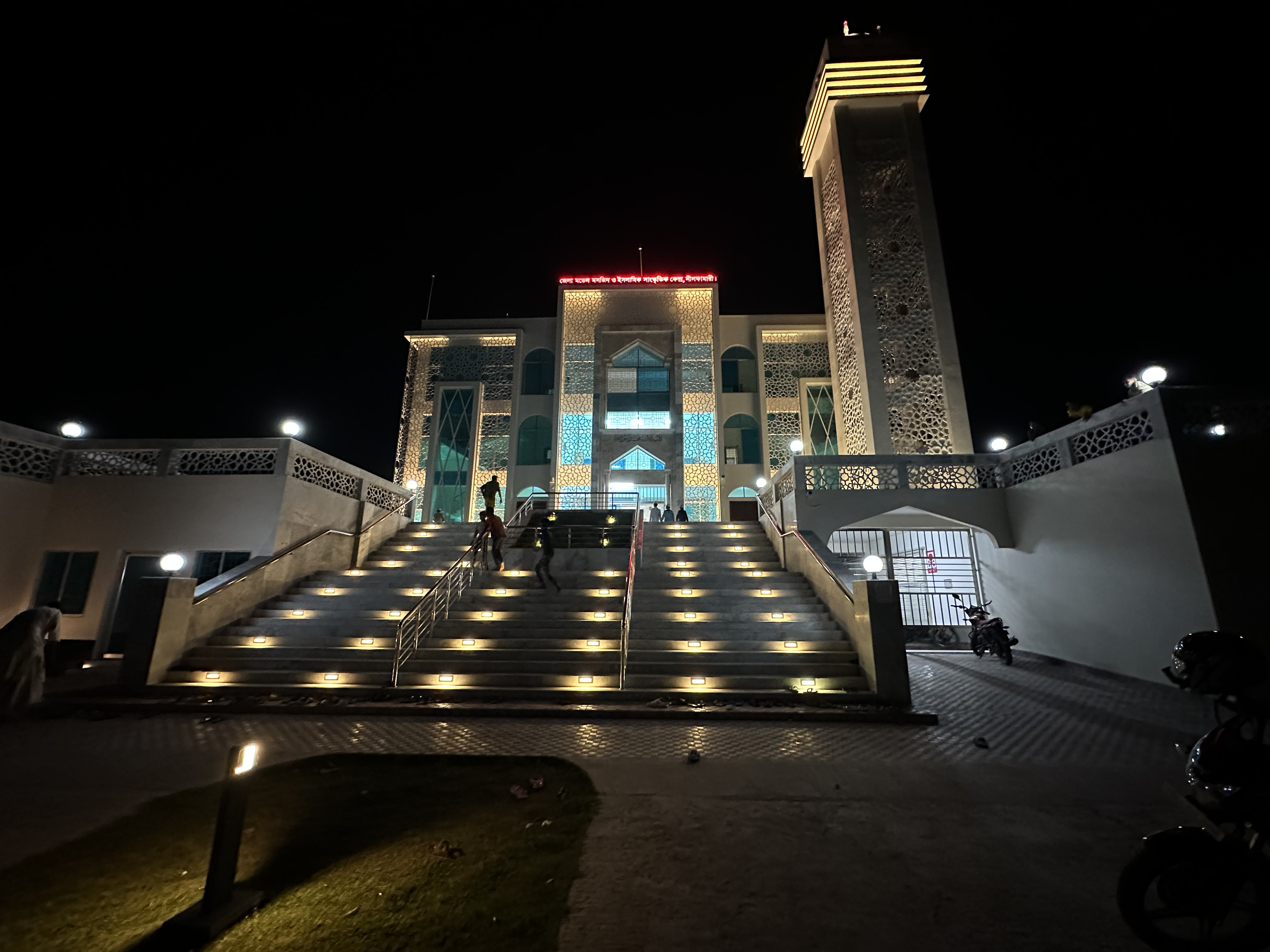
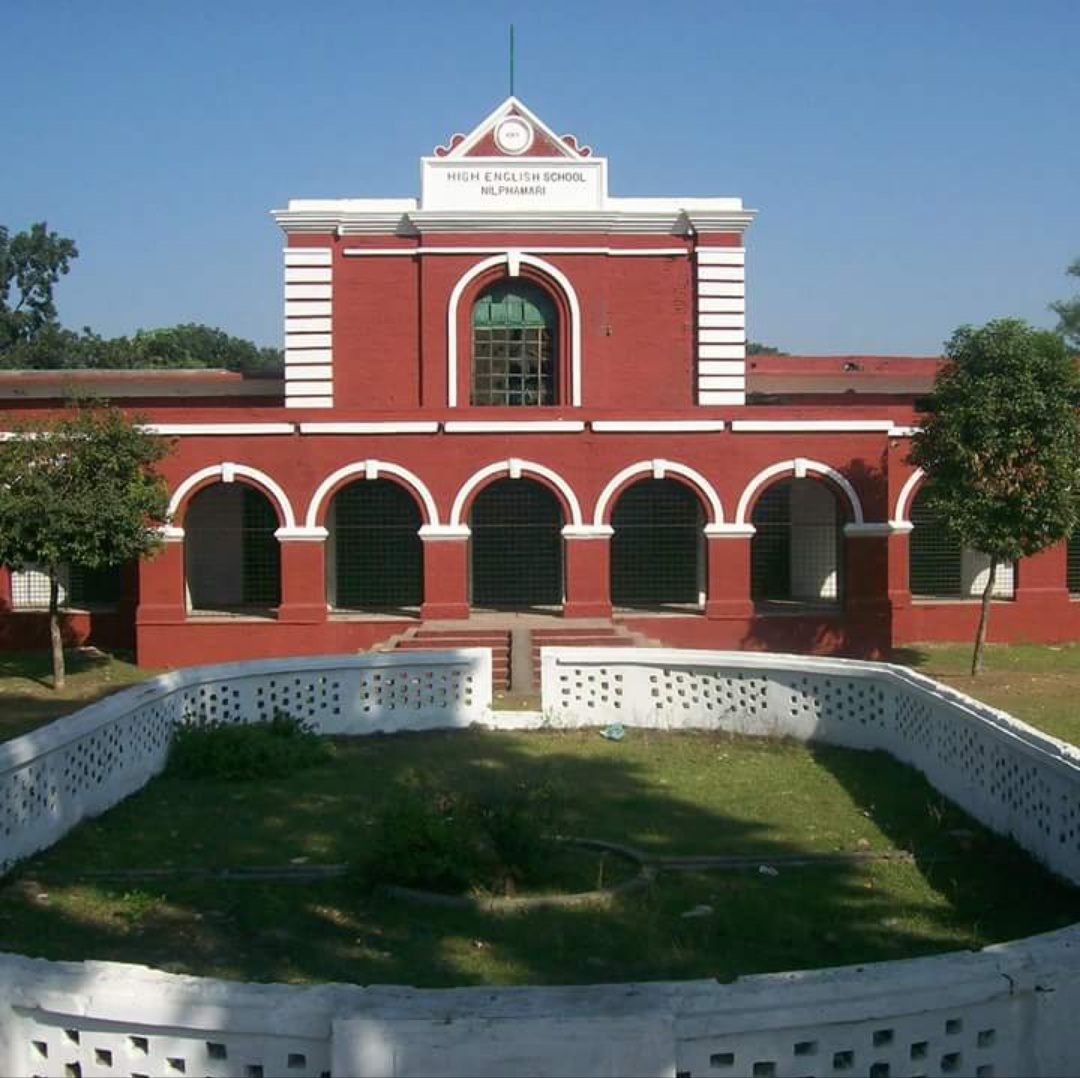
- From top (clockwise): Nilphamari City Model Mosque and Nilphamari Government High School Clockwise from top: Nilphamari City Model Mosque, Nilphamari Government High School
- Etymology: From "Neel Khamar" (indigo farm) — named for the historical indigo plantations established during British colonial rule in the 19th Century, when the area was known for extensive indigo cultivation, as "nil" means blue, the colour of indigo.
- Nickname: Country of NIL (Blue) (নীলের দেশ)
- Interactive map of Nilphamari
- Location in Rangpur division Location in Bangladesh
- Coordinates (Nilphamari City Center): 25°56′10″N 88°50′56″E
- Country: Bangladesh
- Division: Rangpur
- District: Nilphamari
- Upazila: Nilphamari Sadar
- Established as city: 1882
- Founder: British colonial administration
- District Headquarters: Nilphamari City

Government
  - Type: Paurashava
  - Body: Nilphamari Municipality
  - Administrator: Md. Saidul Islam
  - Parliamentary constituency: Jatiya Sangsad (Nilphamari-2)

Area
  - City and Municipality: 27.5 km^{2} (10.6 sq mi)
  - Land: 27.5 km^{2} (10.6 sq mi)
  - Urban: 27.5 km^{2} (10.6 sq mi)

Dimensions
  - Length: 6.4 km (4.0 mi)
  - Width: 5.8 km (3.6 mi)
- Elevation: 45 m (148 ft)

Population (2022)
  - City and Municipality: 85,700
  - Estimate (2026 (projected)): 245,900~
  - Rank: 1st in Nilphamari Sadar Upazila
  - Density: 3,120/km^{2} (8,070/sq mi)
- Demonym: Nilphamarians (aka নীলফামারিবাসী)
- Time zone: UTC+06:00 (BST)
- Postal code: 5300
- Area code: 0551
- ISO 3166 code: BD-46
- Website: nilphamaripourasava.org

Nilphamari Municipality mahallah geocode map

Nilphamari (/nɪlpɑːmɑːriː/; Bengali: নীলফামারী; romanized :Neel-fa-maa-ree; pronounced [nilpʰamaɾi]), is a city that sits in the heart of Nilphamari District in the division of Rangpur, Bangladesh. It serves as the administrative headquarters of Nilphamari District and is one of the major urban centers in the northern region, often referred to as the Industrial City of the North (উত্তরের শিল্পনগরী). The city was founded in 1875 after formation of Mahakuma/Sub-Division Office of Nilphamari at Shakhamacha Hat on the bank of Bamondanga River. The city got its name from its Mahakuma name "Nilphamari", the cultural and historical name of this region.

== Etymology ==
The name "Nilphamari" is understood to be a linguistic evolution of the Bengali words Neel (নীল), meaning "indigo," and Famari (or its variants), which is linked to farming or cultivation. The most widely accepted etymology traces the name back to the term "Neel Khamar" (নীল খামার), which directly translates to "indigo farm."

Over time, the word "Neel Khamar" is believed to have morphed through local pronunciation. One theory suggests that local farmers began referring to the enterprise as "Neel Khamari," which then gradually transformed into the district's present name, "Nilphamari." This evolution is supported by linguistic analysis, which posits that "Nilphamari" is a transliteration of the original compound nīlkhāmārī (নীলখামারী), literally meaning "indigo farm." The shift from "kh" to "ph" reflects local pronunciation patterns common in northern Bengali dialects.

== History ==
=== Ancient and medieval period ===
The area around Nilphamari has been inhabited since ancient times. Archaeological evidence points to settlements dating back over a thousand years. Archaeological excavations at the site have revealed artifacts suggesting habitation during the Pala and Sena periods (8th to 12th centuries).

During the medieval period, the region was part of the Kamarupa kingdom and later came under the influence of the Khen dynasty of Prithu in the 15th century. It subsequently became part of the Mughal Empire in the 17th century, when it was incorporated into the sarkar of Ghoraghat.

=== British colonial period (1757–1947) ===
The modern history of Nilphamari city began with the arrival of the British East India Company in the late 18th century. Following the Battle of Plassey in 1757 and the acquisition of diwani rights over Bengal in 1765, the British began to exploit the region's agricultural potential.

The fertile soil of the Nilphamari area proved highly suitable for indigo cultivation, and the British established numerous indigo farms (Neel Khamar) and processing facilities (Neel Kuthi) throughout the region. The Shakhamacha Hat area, located on the banks of the Bamondanga River, became a major trading post for indigo export. According to 'Nilphamarir Itihas' (History of Nilphamari) by local historian Nasiruddin Ahmed, the famous Shakhamacha bazar of northern region was once situated on the Bamondanga river, surrounding which Nilphamari township developed gradually. The river served as a vital waterway for transporting indigo to larger ports for shipment to Europe.

The exploitation of local farmers by British indigo planters led to widespread resentment and resistance. In 1859-60, the Indigo revolt spread across Bengal, and Nilphamari was one of the centers of this peasant uprising. According to local tradition, the legendary figure Devi Chowdhurani, immortalized in Bankim Chandra Chatterjee's novel Devi Chaudhurani, led resistance against the British planters in this region.

The city of Nilphamari was formally established in 1882 by the British colonial administration. It was built around the relocated subdivision headquarters and the existing Shakhamacha Bazar, transforming the area into an administrative and commercial center. The same year, Nilphamari Government High School was founded as the "English High School," becoming the first secondary educational institution in the region.

=== Liberation War of 1971 ===
During the Bangladesh Liberation War in 1971, Nilphamari was a significant site of resistance against the Pakistan Army. On 7 April 1971, local freedom fighters captured 300 rifles and 10,000 rounds of ammunition from the armory of the Razakar force, seizing weapons for the Mukti Bahini. On 8 April, the Pakistan Army took control over Nilphamari town. The city witnessed several battles between the freedom fighters and the Pakistani military. A memorial monument named "Swadhinatar Smriti Amlan" at Bashar Gate commemorates the liberation struggle. Nilphamari was liberated on 6 December 1971, ten days before the final victory of Bangladesh.

=== Post-independence Bangladesh (1971–present) ===
After the independence of Bangladesh, Nilphamari continued to grow. The Nilphamari Town Committee, formed in 1964, was upgraded to Nilphamari Municipality in 1972. A major milestone came in 1984, when Nilphamari was upgraded from a subdivision to a full-fledged district, with Nilphamari city as its permanent headquarters.

In recent decades, the city has emerged as a significant industrial center. The establishment of the Nilphamari International Stadium in 2018, with a capacity of 20,000, marked the city's arrival on the national sports map. The Nilphamari Medical College was established in 2014 to provide tertiary healthcare and medical education to the northern region.

== Geography ==
Nilphamari city within Sadar Upazila boundary

=== Location and topography ===
Nilphamari city is located in northern Bangladesh at coordinates 25.936°N 88.849°E. It lies approximately 350 kilometres (220 mi) northwest of the capital city Dhaka, 55 kilometres (34 mi) west of Rangpur city, and 20 kilometres (12 mi) south of the international border with India (Cooch Behar district of West Bengal).

The city is situated on the Barind Tract, a slightly elevated Pleistocene terrace, with an average elevation of 45 metres (148 ft) above sea level. The terrain is generally flat, sloping gently from north to south. The highest point in the city is approximately 47 metres (154 ft), while the lowest is around 44 metres (144 ft).

=== Climate ===
Nilphamari has a humid subtropical climate (Köppen climate classification: Cwa), bordering on a tropical savanna climate (Aw). The city experiences three main seasons: a hot, humid summer (March–June), a warm and rainy monsoon (June–October), and a cool, dry winter (November–February).

Climate data for Nilphamari (1991-2021)
Month	Jan	Feb	Mar	Apr	May	Jun	Jul	Aug	Sep	Oct	Nov	Dec	Year
Mean daily maximum °C (°F)	23.6 (74.5)	26.7 (80.1)	31.2 (88.2)	31.7 (89.1)	30.9 (87.6)	30.9 (87.6)	31.0 (87.8)	31.1 (88.0)	30.5 (86.9)	29.5 (85.1)	27.7 (81.9)	24.9 (76.8)	29.1 (84.5)
Daily mean °C (°F)	17.5 (63.5)	20.4 (68.7)	24.8 (76.6)	26.3 (79.3)	26.7 (80.1)	27.5 (81.5)	27.7 (81.9)	27.8 (82.0)	27.1 (80.8)	25.3 (77.5)	22.1 (71.8)	19.0 (66.2)	24.3 (75.8)
Mean daily minimum °C (°F)	11.6 (52.9)	14.0 (57.2)	18.2 (64.8)	21.4 (70.5)	23.1 (73.6)	24.9 (76.8)	25.5 (77.9)	25.5 (77.9)	24.6 (76.3)	21.6 (70.9)	16.7 (62.1)	13.2 (55.8)	20.0 (68.1)
Average rainfall mm (inches)	12 (0.5)	14 (0.6)	29 (1.1)	109 (4.3)	322 (12.7)	476 (18.7)	433 (17.0)	374 (14.7)	315 (12.4)	123 (4.8)	6 (0.2)	5 (0.2)	2,218 (87.2)
Average rainy days	1	2	3	9	16	20	21	20	18	7	1	1	119
Average relative humidity (%)	66	59	48	65	81	86	86	86	87	82	69	66	73
Source 1: Climate Data
Source 2: Bangladesh Meteorological Department (for temperature extremes)

== Demographics ==
Population history
Year	Pop.	±%
1991	49,862	—
2001	57,841	+16.0%
2011	68,662	+18.7%
2022	85,700	+24.8%

Religions in Nilphamari city (2011)
Religion	Percent
Muslims	85.72%
Hindus	13.52%
Other or not stated	0.76%

According to the 2022 Bangladesh census, Nilphamari city has a population of approximately 85,700, making it the largest urban center in Nilphamari Sadar Upazila. The city has a literacy rate of 81.15%, significantly higher than the national average. The population density was approximately 3,116/km^{2} (8,070/sq mi). The majority of the population is Bengali Muslim, with a significant Bengali Hindu minority, and the primary spoken language is Bengali, particularly the Rangpuri dialect.

According to the 2011 Bangladesh census, Nilphamari city had 9,448 households and a population of 45,386. 8,789 (19.37%) were under 10 years of age. Nilphamari had a literacy rate (age 7 and over) of 64.13%, compared to the national average of 51.8%, and a sex ratio of 949 females per 1000 males.

The majority of the population is Bengali Muslim, with a significant Bengali Hindu minority. According to Banglapedia, the religious breakdown of Nilphamari Sadar Upazila (which includes the city) is: Muslim 293,509, Hindu 77,740, Buddhist 344, Christian 15 and others 271.

The main spoken language is Bengali, specifically the Rangpuri (Northern Bengali) dialect, which has distinctive phonetic features including the characteristic "kh" to "ph" shift seen in the city's name.

== Administration ==
Major parts of Nilphamari city are administered by Nilphamari Municipality (নীলফামারী পৌরসভা), while some peripheral areas are under adjacent union parishads (Itakhola, Kundupukur, Khokshabari, and Tupamari).

The municipality was established in 1972, upgrading the former Nilphamari Town Committee (formed in 1964). At present, Nilphamari Municipality is divided into 15 wards. The current area of the municipality is 27.50 km^{2} (10.62 sq mi). An ongoing expansion project aims to incorporate additional areas, which would increase the municipal area to 42.70 km^{2} (16.49 sq mi).

Following the national trend of administrative decentralization, the city serves as the headquarters of: - Nilphamari Zila Parishad (District Council) - Nilphamari Sadar Upazila Parishad - Nilphamari Municipality

== Government and politics ==
=== Administrative structure ===
Nilphamari City, serving as the headquarters of both Nilphamari District and Nilphamari Sadar Upazila, is a key administrative hub in northern Bangladesh. The city is administered by the Nilphamari Municipality (also known as Nilphamari Paurashava), a local government body responsible for civic services and infrastructure.

The Nilphamari Town Committee was first formed in 1964, which was later upgraded to a municipality in 1972. For administrative purposes, the municipality is currently divided into 15 wards. These wards are the smallest electoral units, each represented by a directly elected ward councilor. The city falls under the Nilphamari Sadar Upazila, which itself comprises the municipality and 15 union parishads, along with numerous mouzas and villages.

=== Political representation ===
On a national level, Nilphamari City is part of the parliamentary constituency Nilphamari-2. Created in 1984 following the reorganization of the erstwhile Rangpur district, this constituency encompasses the entire Nilphamari Sadar Upazila.

Historically, the seat has seen representation from various parties. A prominent figure in its political history is Asaduzzaman Noor, a cultural personality and actor, who represented the constituency multiple times for the Awami League, winning elections in 2008, 2014 (unopposed), and 2018. In the 12th National Parliamentary election, he secured 119,339 votes.

However, in a significant political shift during the 13th National Parliamentary election held in 2026, the constituency was won by Al-Faruk Abdul Latif, a candidate nominated by the Bangladesh Jamaat-e-Islami. He secured 146,430 votes, defeating his nearest rival, Shahrin Islam Chowdhury Tuhin of the BNP, who received 135,418 votes. This victory was part of a wider sweep by Jamaat-e-Islami, which won all four parliamentary seats in Nilphamari District in the 2026 election. As of the most recent update following this election, the constituency is represented by Al-Faruk Abdul Latif.

=== Local government ===
The day-to-day governance of the city is managed by the Nilphamari Municipality. The current administrator of the municipality is Md. Saidul Islam. The municipality is responsible for providing essential services such as water supply, sanitation, waste management, street lighting, and maintaining roads and drainage systems within the city limits.

== See also ==
- Nilphamari District
- Nilphamari Sadar Upazila
- Rangpur Division
- List of cities and towns in Bangladesh
- Rishad Hossain
