= Board of Intermediate and Secondary Education, Dinajpur =

Education board in Bangladesh

- মাধ্যমিক ও উচ্চ মাধ্যমিক শিক্ষা বোর্ড, দিনাজপুর
- Emblem of the Dinajpur Education Board

Board overview
- Formed: 2006; 20 years ago
- Jurisdiction: Government of Bangladesh
- Headquarters: Dinajpur, Bangladesh; 25.683852°N 88.657587°E
- Board executives: Prof. Eliash Ahmed, Chairman; Prof. Nur Md. Abdur Razzaq, Secretary
- Parent department: Ministry of Education
- Website: dinajpureducationboard.gov.bd

The Board of Intermediate and Secondary Education, Dinajpur, Bangladesh an autonomous organization, mainly responsible for holding three public examinations (Junior School Certificate (JSC), Secondary School Certificate (SSC), and Higher Secondary Certificate (HSC) and for providing recognition to the newly established non-government educational institutions and also for the supervision, control and developments of those institutions. It started the operation in 2006. Before that, this education board was within the Rajshahi Education Board.

== Districts under Dinajpur Education Board ==
- Dinajpur
- Gaibandha
- Kurigram
- Lalmonirhat
- Nilphamari
- Panchagarh
- Rangpur
- Thakurgaon

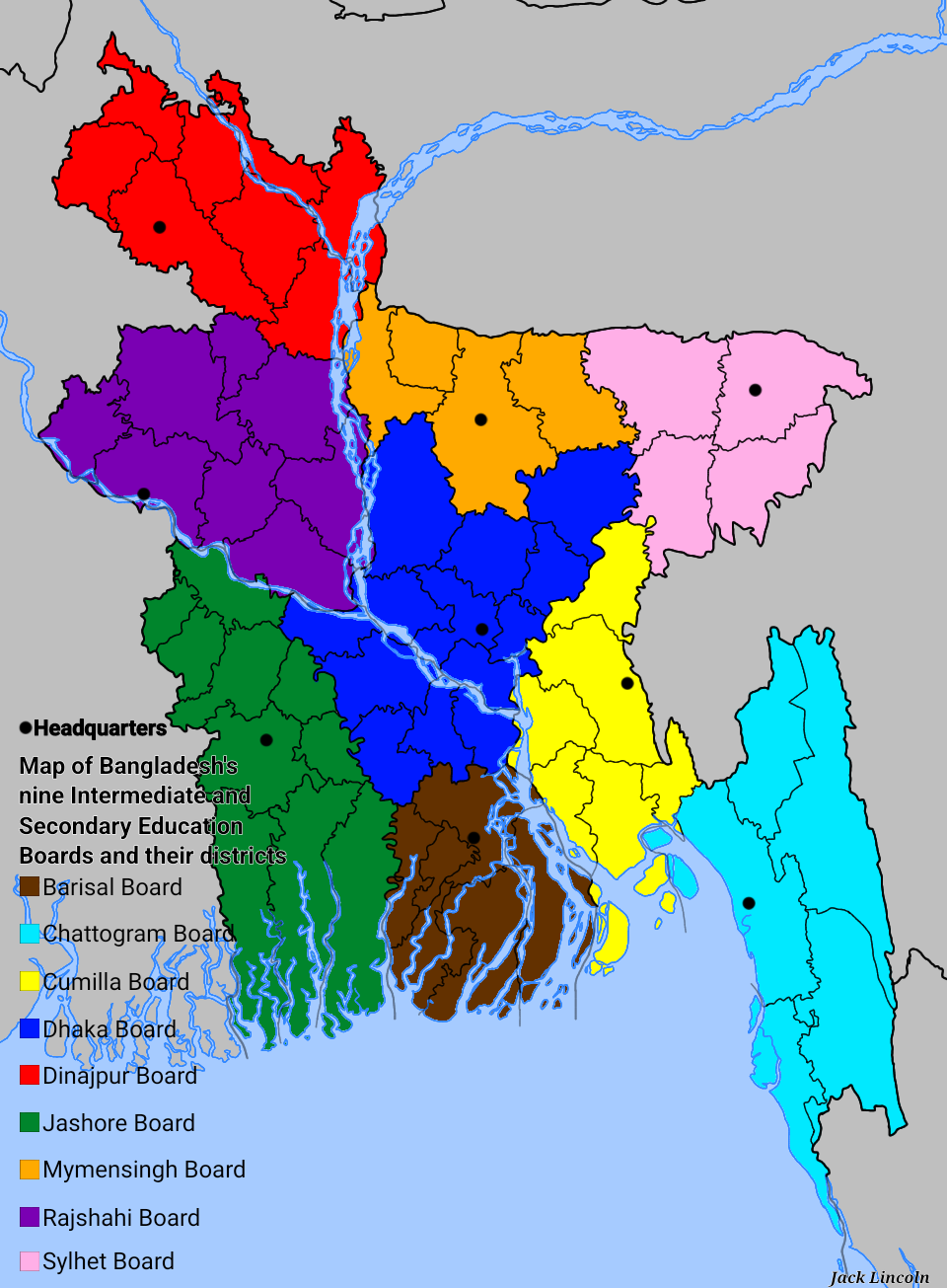
Map of Bangladesh's nine Intermediate and Secondary Education Boards and their districts

== History ==
As by the ordinance of the board, The East Pakistan Intermediate and Secondary Education Ordinance, 1961 (East Pakistan Ordinance No. XXXIII of 1961) and its Section 3A(1) is responsible for the organization, regulation, supervision, control and development of Intermediate, Secondary and Junior level public examinations and educational institutions of Nilphamari, Rangpur, Kurigram, Lalmonirhat, Gaibandha, Dinajpur, Thakurgaon and Panchagarh.

== See also ==
- List of Intermediate and Secondary Education Boards in Bangladesh
