= Kushtia Central Eidgah =

Eidgahs in Bangladesh

- কুষ্টিয়া কেন্দ্রীয় ঈদগাহ
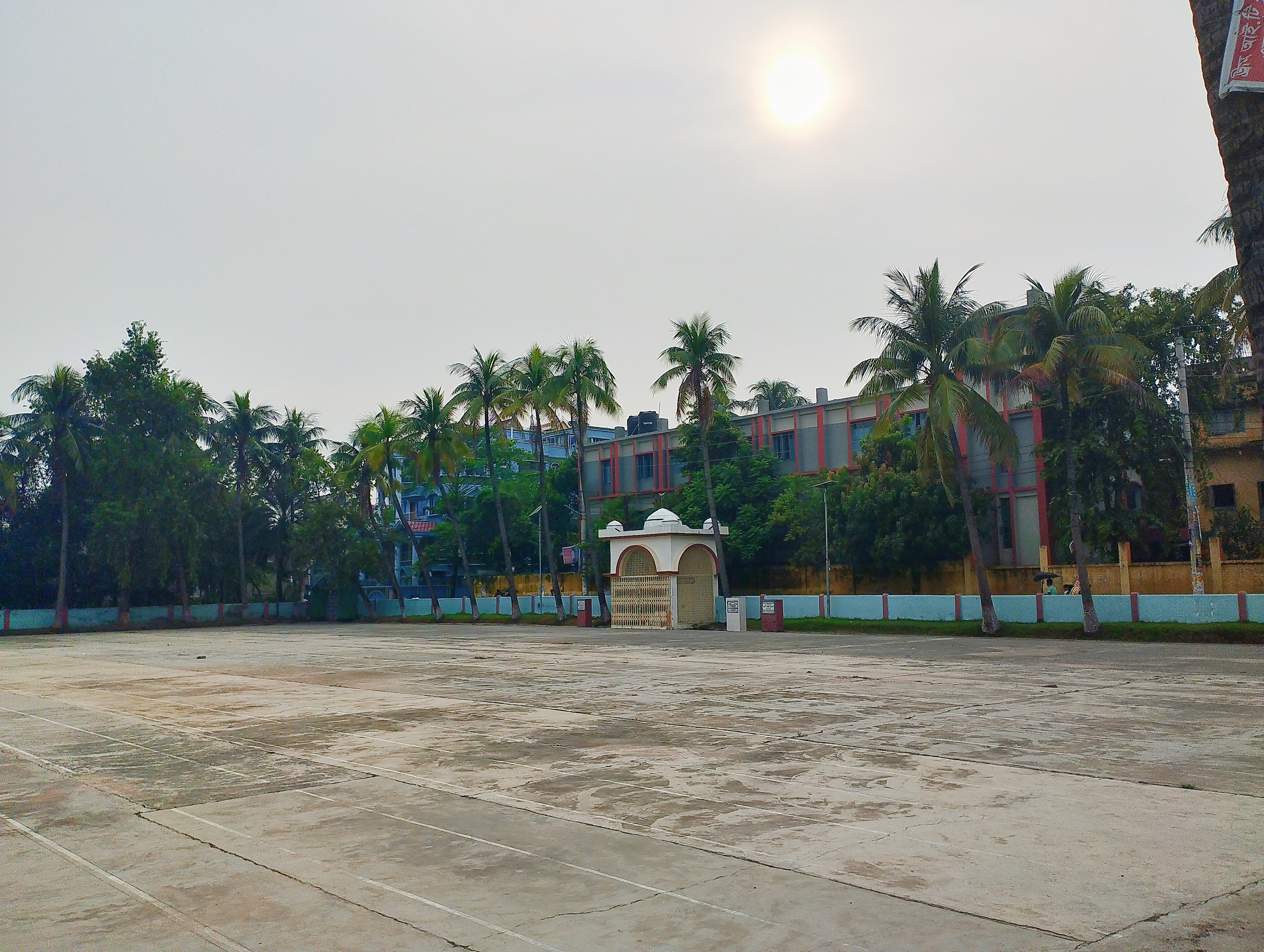

- Location within Khulna division Location within Bangladesh

Religion
- Affiliation: Islam

Location
- Location: Courtpara, Kushtia
- Municipality: Kushtia
- Country: Bangladesh
- Interactive map of Kushtia Central Eidgah
- Coordinates: 23.904004°N 89.130339°E

Architecture
- Established: 1945; 81 years ago
- Site area: 1.5 acres (6,100 m^{2})

Kushtia Eidgah (Bengali: কুষ্টিয়া ঈদগাহ) also known as the Kushtia Central Eidgah is a religious site located in Kushtia, Bangladesh. The main congregational prayers for the two Eid festivals in Kushtia are held at this Eidgah. It was established in 1945.

== History ==
The Eidgah was established in 1945 in the Courtpara (Eidgahpara) neighborhoods in Kushtia. In the same year the Sirajul Haq Muslim High School was established to the north of the Eidgah. Notable individuals such as Maulana Mezbahr Rahman, Advocate Abdur Rahim, and Khandaker Lutfel Haque were among the key initiators behind the establishment of the Eidgah.

== Infrastructure ==
The Eidgah ground covers an area of approximately 1.5 acres (6,100 m^{2}). There are a total of five entrances around the site. A central minbar (pulpit) is located on the western side. Recently, an ablution (wudu) facility has been constructed. The entire floor of the Eidgah is paved.

== Location ==
The Eidgah is located in the Eidgah Para area of Kushtia. On the west side of the Eidgah are the Afsar Uddin Mahila Fazil Madrasa and the Kamrul Islam Siddique Municipal Shishu Park. To the north lies the Muslim High School, Kushtia, while to the south is the Kushtia Government College. The eastern side is known as Eidgahpara. The distance from the Kushtia Court railway station to the Eidgah is approximately 0.55 kilometres (550 m).

== Gallery ==
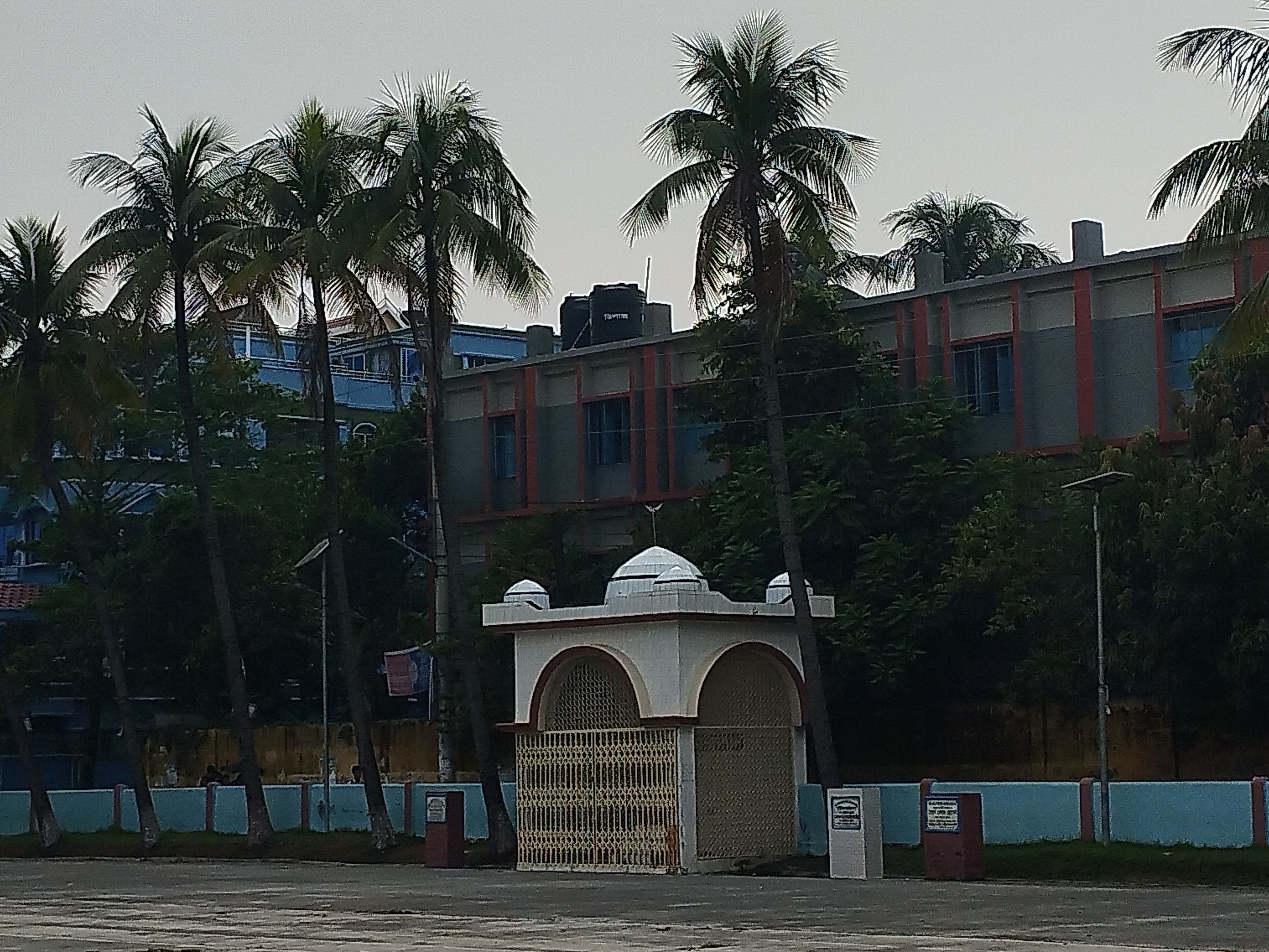
Minbar

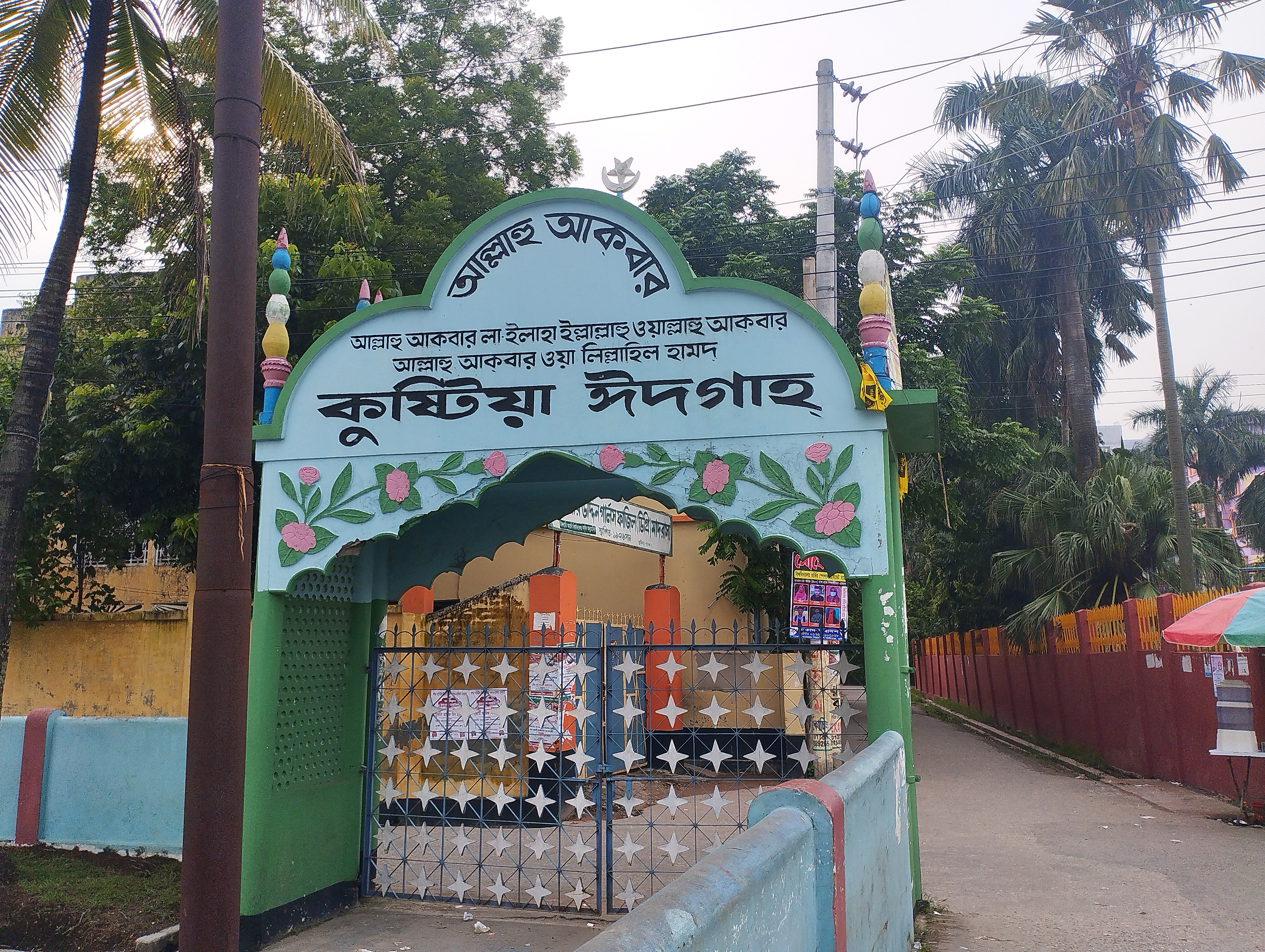
A gate on the west side

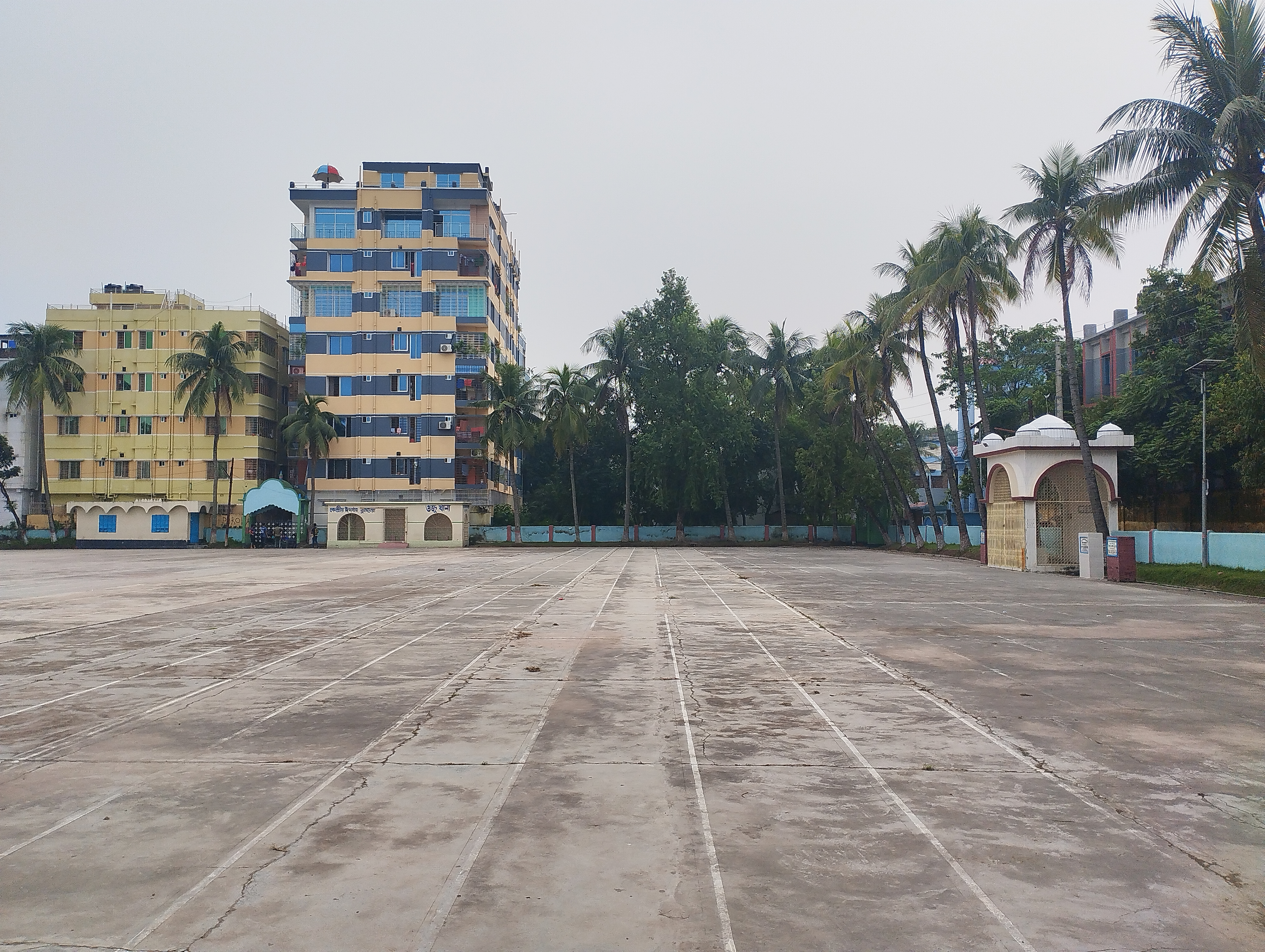
Southern side

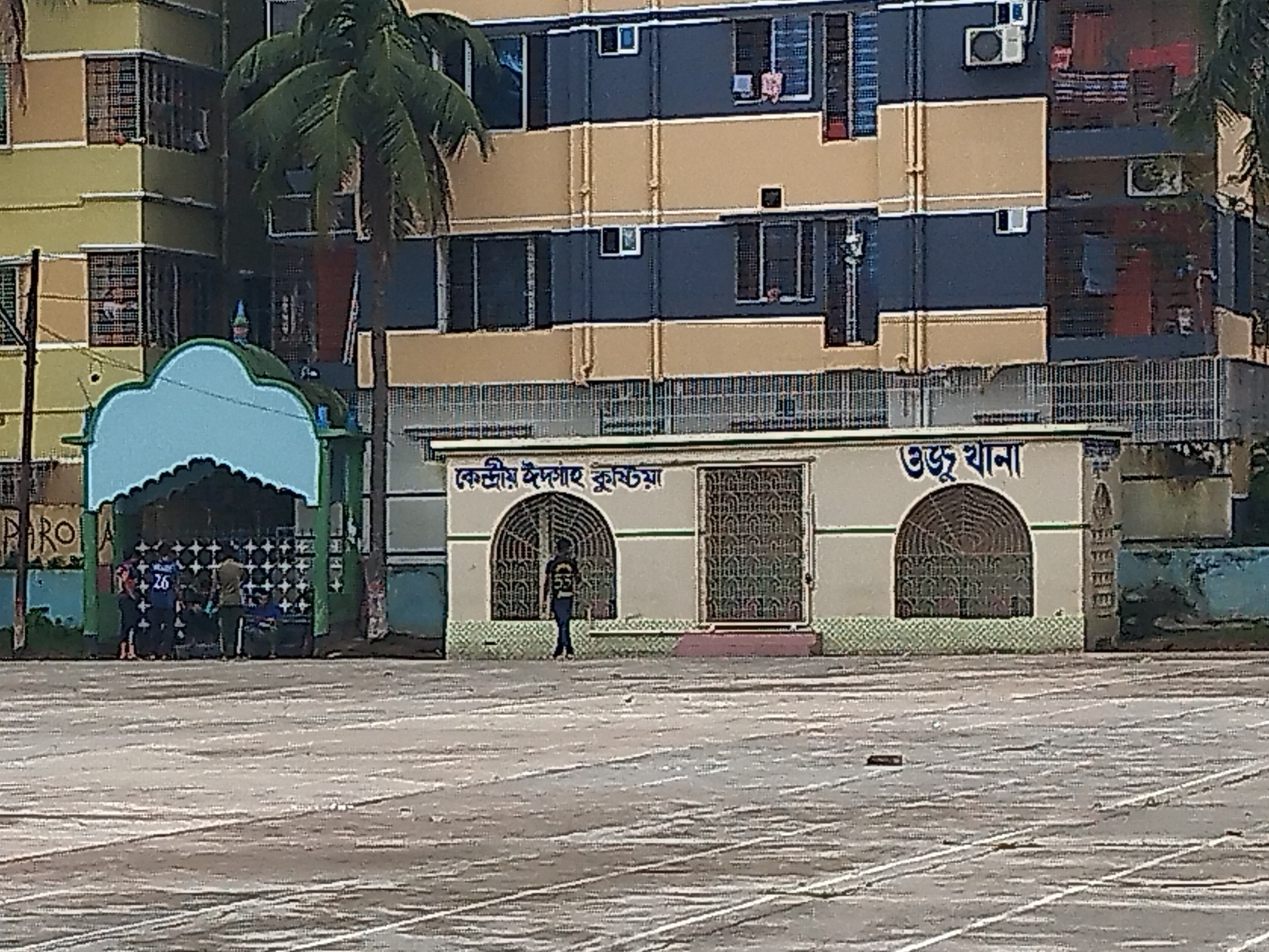
Ablution area and a southern gate

== See also ==
- Faridpur Central Eidgah

== External ==
- Media related to Kushtia Central Eidgah Maidan at Wikimedia Commons
- Kushtia Central Eidgah in Wikimapia
