= Lakshmipur Government College =

- লক্ষ্মীপুর সরকারি কলেজ
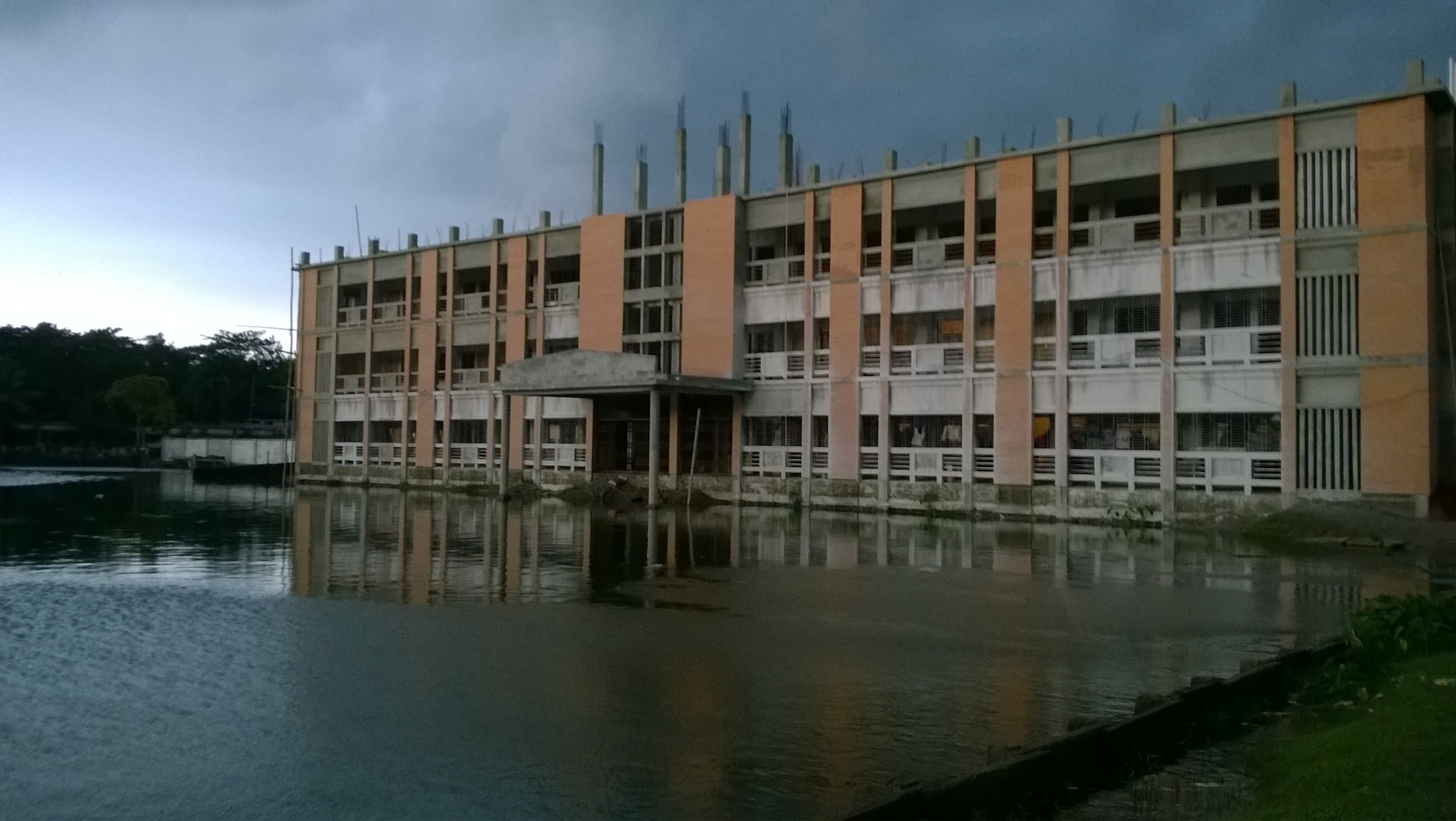
- Academic building under construction<
- Motto: Know Yourself Beyond
- Type: Public
- Established: 1961
- Academic affiliations: National University
- Chancellor: Abdul Hamid
- Vice-Chancellor: Harun-or-Rashid
- Principal: Mohammad Mahabubul Karim
- Location: Lakshmipur, Bangladesh; 22.9330°N 90.8268°E
- Campus: Urban
- Website: www.laxmipurgovtcollege.edu.bd

Lakshmipur Government College (Bengali: লক্ষ্মীপুর সরকারি কলেজ; abbr. LGC) is a public college located in Lakshmipur, Bangladesh. It offers higher-secondary education (HSC). It has Bachelor's degree and Master's degree programs as well, in which divisions are affiliated with the University of Chittagong since 16 February 2016. Among 685 colleges under National University, Lakshmipur Government College has been ranked 8th according to National University Ranking of honours & masters in 2015 in Chittagong Division.
