= Kazi Shahidullah =

Bangladeshi academic (1952 – 2025)

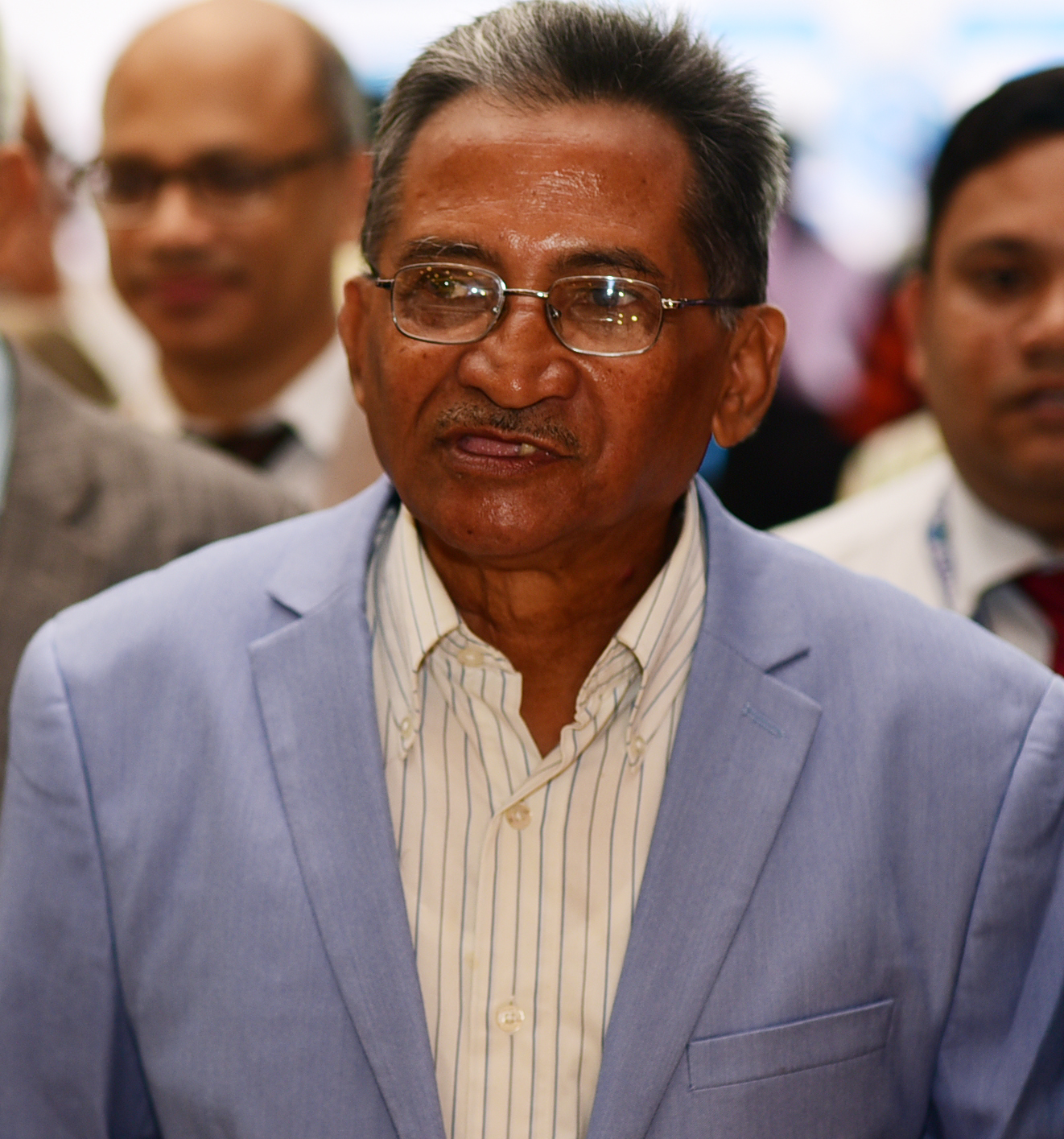
- Shahidullah at Premier University (2019)

Chairman of University Grants Commission
- In office 22 May 2019 – 11 August 2024
- President: Mohammad Abdul Hamid; Mohammed Shahabuddin
- Prime Minister: Sheikh Hasina; Muhammad Yunus (Chief adviser)
- Preceded by: Yusuf Ali Mollah
- Succeeded by: Syed Muhammed Abul Faiz

Vice-Chancellor of National University of Bangladesh
- In office 24 February 2009 – 5 March 2013
- Chancellor: Zillur Rahman; Mohammad Abdul Hamid
- Preceded by: M Mofakhkharul Islam
- Succeeded by: Harun-or-Rashid

Personal details
- Born: 2 June 1952
- Died: 19 March 2025 (aged 72) Canberra, Australian Capital Territory, Australia
- Relatives: Kazi Zafarullah (brother)
- Education: Dhaka College; University of Dhaka; University of British Columbia; University of Western Australia

Kazi Shahidullah (Bengali: কাজী শহীদুল্লাহ; 6 June 1952 – 19 March 2025) was a Bangladeshi academic and chairman of Bangladesh University Grants Commission from 2019 to 2024.

== Career ==
Shahidullah served as the vice-chancellor of the National University of Bangladesh from 2009 to 2013. He taught history at the University of Dhaka.

In the aftermath of 2024 Non-cooperation movement in Bangladesh, Shahidullah resigned as chairman of Bangladesh University Grants Commission on 11 August 2024, citing illness. He had been receiving treatments in Australia since August 2023.

== Personal life and death ==
Shahidullah died from cancer in Canberra on 19 March 2025, at the age of 72.

Shahidullah was buried in Wooden Cemetery in Canberra, on Section M, Position 98.

Kazi Shahidullah was the son of Kazi Mahbubullah and Begum Zebunnesa, he was one of Kazi Zafarullah's brothers.
