= National University, Bangladesh =

Public collegiate university in Bangladesh

National University
- জাতীয় বিশ্ববিদ্যালয়
- Crest of National University
- Type: Public
- Established: October 21, 1992; 34 years ago
- Budget: ৳2097.314 Crore
- Chancellor: President of Bangladesh
- Vice-Chancellor: A. S. M. Amanullah
- Faculty: 159,375 (incl. Affiliated colleges)
- Administrative staff: 1,188
- Students: 3,425,832
- Undergraduates: 1,755,256
- Postgraduates: 334,653
- Doctoral students: 184
- Other students: 7,048
- Location: Gazipur, Bangladesh; 23.9499°N 90.3808°E
- Campus: 20.54 acres (8.31 ha) (Main Campus); 2,257 affiliated colleges
- Website: nu.ac.bd

National University (NU; Bengali: জাতীয় বিশ্ববিদ্যালয়) is a public collegiate university of Bangladesh that was established in 1992 by an Act of Parliament as an affiliating university of the country to impart graduate and post-graduate level education to students through its affiliated colleges, schools and professional institutions throughout the country. The number of colleges under the NU is 2,257. Among these, 555 are government colleges. A total of 881 colleges offer honors courses. It is the second-largest university in the world in terms of enrollment. The headquarters is in Gazipur, on the outskirts of Dhaka. After its establishment, the university began affiliating with association degree-awarding colleges, many of which were previously affiliated with the University of Dhaka, University of Rajshahi, University of Chittagong and Shahjalal University of Science and Technology.

== Organization ==
It is an undergraduate, postgraduate teaching and research university as well as an affiliating university. It is state-run and public. The university has a school and a centre. It has established institutes that provide courses leading to MPhil and PhD degrees.

The Institute of Humanities and Social Sciences (IHS) was established in 1997 to offer a two-year MPhil program based on a modern American-style credit hour and semester system, which includes coursework, a two-month internship, and a thesis supervised by a faculty member. The M.Phil. is an interdisciplinary degree which is intensive enough to help the students to pursue PhD courses. The course is open to faculty members who are employed at universities and colleges.

Four more institutes – the Institute of Liberation and Bangladesh Studies (ILBS), Institute of National Science (INS), Institute of Life Sciences (ILS), and Institute of Business and Management Studies (IBMS) – have all the formalities complete toward their constitutions and are soon to provide higher courses related to science, needs of life, and national heritage.

Very few of the teachers teaching at honours and masters level have higher training. The training programme of the university is designed to augment the knowledge of the college teachers, enhance their skill in teaching and get them an exposure to higher ideas. Eminent educationists and scholars of the country are associated with the academic programmes provided on campus.

There are four academic units:

- School of Undergraduate Studies
- Centre for Postgraduate Studies Training & Research
- M.Phil./Ph.D. Programme Unit
- Centre for Curriculum Development and Evaluation

The school and centres organise education in colleges and improve the standard. The university provides bachelor's, honours and master's degrees in ten disciplines: languages, humanities, social science, commerce and business administration, physical sciences, mathematical sciences, biological science, education, law and computer technology.

Apart from the units providing campus teaching at Board Bazar, Gazipur, the university has about 2,257 affiliated colleges. These colleges under its academic control cater for courses leading to Pass, Honours and master's degrees. The university exercises academic control over the colleges according to the National University Act 1992 mandated by the National Parliament of Bangladesh and the statutes of the university. It provides the curricula and syllabi, arranges admission test, gives guidelines for admission, arranges inspection, holds examination, publishes results, and awards certificates.

The National University of Bangladesh is now the fifth largest university in the world after its 17-year history by its number of registered students at affiliated colleges. It is also one of the largest universities in the world by number of affiliated colleges and number of expanding subjects and courses.

== Academic departments ==
- Faculty of Arts
  - Department of Arabic
  - Department of Bengali
  - Department of English
  - Department of Pali
  - Department of Sanskrit
  - Department of History
  - Department of Islamic History & Culture
  - Department of Islamic Studies
- Faculty of Law (Professionals)
  - Department of LAW
- Faculty of Fine Arts (Professionals)
  - Department of Fine Arts (BFA)
- Faculty of Education (Professionals)
  - Department of Education
- Faculty of Business Studies
  - Department of BBA (Professional)
  - Department of Aviation Management
  - Department of Accounting
  - Department of Finance & Banking
  - Department of Management
  - Department of Marketing
  - Department of Tourism and Hospitality Management
- Faculty of Engineering (Professionals)
  - Dept. of Aeronautical and Aviation Science and Engineering
  - Dept. of Computer Science and Engineering
  - Dept. of Electronics and Communication Engineering
- Faculty of Life & Earth Science
  - Department of Psychology
  - Department of Botany
  - Department of Zoology
  - Department of Geography & Environment Studies
- Faculty of Science
  - Department of Computer Science
  - Department of Bio-Chemistry
  - Department of Chemistry
  - Department of Physics
  - Department of Mathematics
  - Department of Statistics
- Faculty of Social Science
  - Department of Economics
  - Department of Political science
  - Department of Sociology
  - Department of Social Work
  - Department of Anthropology
  - Department of Public Administration
  - Department of Home Economics
  - Department of Information Science and Library Management
- Faculty of Textile Technology (Professionals)
  - Department of Textile Science and Technology
  - Department of Fashion Design & Technology
  - Department of Apparel Manufacture & Technology
  - Department of Knitwear Manufacture & Technology

== Vice-chancellors ==
Full list of the vice-chancellors.

1. Muhammad Abdul Bari (1992–1996)
2. Aminul Islam (1996–2000)
3. Durgadas Bhattacharjee (2000–2001)
4. Abdul Momin Chowdhury (2001–2003)
5. Aftab Ahmad (2003–2005)
6. Wakil Ahmed (2005–2007)
7. Syed Rashedul Hasan (in-charge;2007–2008)
8. M Mofakhkharul Islam (2008–2009)
9. Kazi Shahidullah (2009–2013)
10. Harun-or-Rashid (2013–2021)
11. Md. Moshiur Rahman (2021–2024)
12. A S M Amanullah (2024–)

== Research and publication ==
- The National University Journal
- Publication "7 দফা'র 100 বছর"
- Newsletter
- Samachar
- Masters Regular Quata Admission Result

== Admission ==
- On Campus
  - NU Undergraduate Program (Honours)
  - On-Campus Masters Final
  - PGD in Library and Information Science
  - NU On-Campus M.Phil.
  - NU On-Campus Ph.D.
- Institute of Liberation War and Bangladesh Studies (ILBS)
  - ILBS MPhil
  - ILBS PhD
- PGD Program
  - NU Skill-based PGD Program
- Affiliated Colleges/Institutes
  - Honours
  - Honours Professional
  - Degree Pass
  - Private Degree (Pass)
  - Private Certificate Course
  - Masters (Professional)
  - Masters (Regular)
  - Masters (Professional)
  - Preliminary to Masters( Regular)
  - Masters (Private)
  - Preliminary to Masters(Private)

Until the 2014–15 academic year, admission to undergraduate (honors) programs under the National University was conducted through entrance examinations. However, from the 2015–16 academic year, the admission process shifted to a merit-based system, relying solely on SSC and HSC examination results. After nearly a decade, the National University reintroduced entrance examinations for undergraduate admissions starting from the 2024–25 academic year.

On May 31, 2025, a total of 560,595 students appeared for the admission test against 440,195 available seats across 264 government and 617 non-government colleges affiliated with the National University.

== Affiliated colleges & institutions ==
There are around 2,254 colleges affiliated to NUB. Some of them include according to College performance Ranking 2015, 2016, 2017, 2018:

=== Top 5 colleges ===
- Rajshahi College (Ranking 2015, 2016, 2017, 2018)
- Azizul Haque College, Bogura (Ranking 2016, 2017, 2018)
- Brojomohun College (Ranking 2015, 2016, 2017)
- Carmichael College (Ranking 2016, 2017, 2018)
- Edward College, Pabna (Ranking 2016, 2017, 2018)
- Ananda Mohan College (Ranking 2018)
- Dhaka Commerce College (Ranking 2015)

=== Top college by region ===
Rangpur region

- Carmichael College (Ranking 2015, 2016, 2017, 2018)
- Rangpur Government College (Ranking 2015, 2016, 2017, 2018)
- Dinajpur Government College (Ranking 2015, 2016, 2017, 2018)
- Kurigram Government College (Ranking 2015, 2016, 2017, 2018)
- Begum Rokeya College, Rangpur (Ranking 2015, 2016, 2017, 2018)
- Nilphamari Govt. College (Ranking 2015, 2016, 2018)
- Uttar Bangla College (Ranking 2015, 2016, 2017, 2018)
- Gaibandha Govt. College (Ranking 2016, 2017, 2018)
- Adarsha College, Dinajpur (Ranking 2016, 2017, 2018)
- Hatibandha Alimuddin College (Ranking 2015, 2017, 2018)
- Lalmonirhat Government College (Ranking 2015, 2017)
- Dinajpur Govt. Women's College (Ranking 2015)
- Thakurgaon Government College (Ranking 2016)
- K. B. M. College, Dinajpur (Ranking 2017)

Dhaka region

- Dhaka Commerce College (Ranking 2015, 2016, 2017, 2018)
- Lalmatia Govt. Mohila College (Ranking 2015, 2016, 2017, 2018)
- Government Saadat College (Ranking 2015, 2016, 2017, 2018)
- Tejgaon College (Ranking 2016, 2017, 2018)
- Government Rajendra College (Ranking 2016, 2017, 2018)
- Adamjee Cantonment College (Ranking 2016, 2017, 2018)
- Siddheswari Girls' College, Dhaka (Ranking 2016, 2017, 2018)
- Siddheswari College, Dhaka (Ranking 2017, 2018)
- Habibullah Bahar College (Ranking 2017, 2018)
- Government Tolaram College (Ranking 2018)
- Gurudayal Government College (Ranking 2017)
- Dania College, Dhaka (Ranking 2017)
- Nurul Amin Degree College (Ranking 2017)
- Dhaka City College (Ranking 2015)
- Major General Mahmudul Hasan Adarsha College, Tangail.

Mymensingh region

- Ananda Mohan College (Ranking 2015, 2016, 2017, 2018)
- Netrakona Government College (Ranking 2017, 2018)
- Muminunnisa Government Mohila College (Ranking 2017, 2018)
- Jahanara Latif Mohila College (Ranking 2017, 2018)
- Govt. Shahid Smriti College (Ranking 2017, 2018)
- Islampur College, Jamalpur (Ranking 2017, 2018)
- Gouripur Mohila College (Ranking 2018)
- Sherpur Govt. Mohila College (Ranking 2018)
- Krishnapur Hazi Ali Akbar Public College (Ranking 2017)

Rajshahi region

- Rajshahi College (Ranking 2015, 2016, 2017, 2018)
- Azizul Haque College, Bogura (Ranking 2015, 2016, 2017, 2018)
- Sirajganj Govt. College (Ranking 2015, 2016, 2017, 2018)
- Syed Ahmed College, Bogura (Ranking 2015, 2016, 2017, 2018)
- Edward College, Pabna (Ranking 2016, 2017, 2018)
- Nawabganj Govt. College (Ranking 2015, 2016, 2018)
- Govt. Mujibur Rahman Mohila College (Ranking 2015, 2016, 2018)
- New Government Degree College, Rajshahi (Ranking 2015, 2016, 2018)
- Nawab Siraj-Ud-Dowla Govt. College (Ranking 2016, 2017, 2018)
- Naogaon Government College (Ranking 2015, 2018)
- Bhabaniganj College, Rajshahi (Ranking 2015, 2017)
- Rajshahi Government Women's College (Ranking 2015, 2016)
- Hazi Wahed Mariam College (Ranking 2017)
- Daokandi College, Rajshahi (Ranking 2017)
- Rajshahi Court College (Ranking 2017)

Chittagong region

- Comilla Victoria Government College (Ranking 2015, 2016, 2017, 2018)
- Chittagong College (Ranking 2015, 2016, 2017, 2018)
- Feni Government College (Ranking 2015, 2016, 2017, 2018)
- Government City College, Chattogram (Ranking 2015, 2016, 2017, 2018)
- Brahmanbaria Government College (Ranking 2015, 2016, 2017, 2018)
- Chittagong Government Women's College (Ranking 2015, 2016, 2017, 2018)
- Government Hazi Mohammad Mohsin College, Chittagong (Ranking 2015, 2016, 2017, 2018)
- Noakhali Government College (Ranking 2016, 2017, 2018)
- Patiya Government College (Ranking 2015, 2016)
- Chandpur Government College (Ranking 2017, 2018)
- Lakshmipur Government College (Ranking 2015)
- Omargani M.E.S. College (Ranking 2015)
- Comilla Government Women's College (Ranking 2016)
- Hathazari Government College (Ranking 2017)
- Mosharrof Hossain Khan Chowdhury Degree College (Ranking 2018)

Khulna region

- Brajalal College (Ranking 2018)
- Michael Madhusudan College (Ranking 2018)
- Kushtia Government College (Ranking 2018)
- Shimanta Adarsha College, Satkhira (Ranking 2018)
- Cantonment College, Jashore (Ranking 2018)
- Kumira Mohila Degree College (Ranking 2018)
- Jhaudanga College (Ranking 2018)
- Khulna Govt. Girls College (Ranking 2018)
- M.S. Zoha Degree College (Ranking 2018)
- Chuadanga Government College (Ranking 2018)

Barishal region

- Brojomohun College (Ranking 2018)
- Bhola Govt. College (Ranking 2018)
- Patuakhali Govt. College (Ranking 2018)
- Government Syed Hatem Ali College (Ranking 2018)
- Charfasson Government College (Ranking 2017, 2015)

Sylhet region

- Murari Chand College (Ranking 2018)
- Sylhet Government Women's College (Ranking 2018)
- Moulvibazar Government College (Ranking 2018)
- Moinuddin Adarsha Mohila College, Sylhet (Ranking 2018)
- Dakshin Surma Government College (Ranking 2018)
- Sunamganj Government College (Ranking 2018)
