= Dhaka Commerce College =

Private College in Dhaka

- ঢাকা কমার্স কলেজ
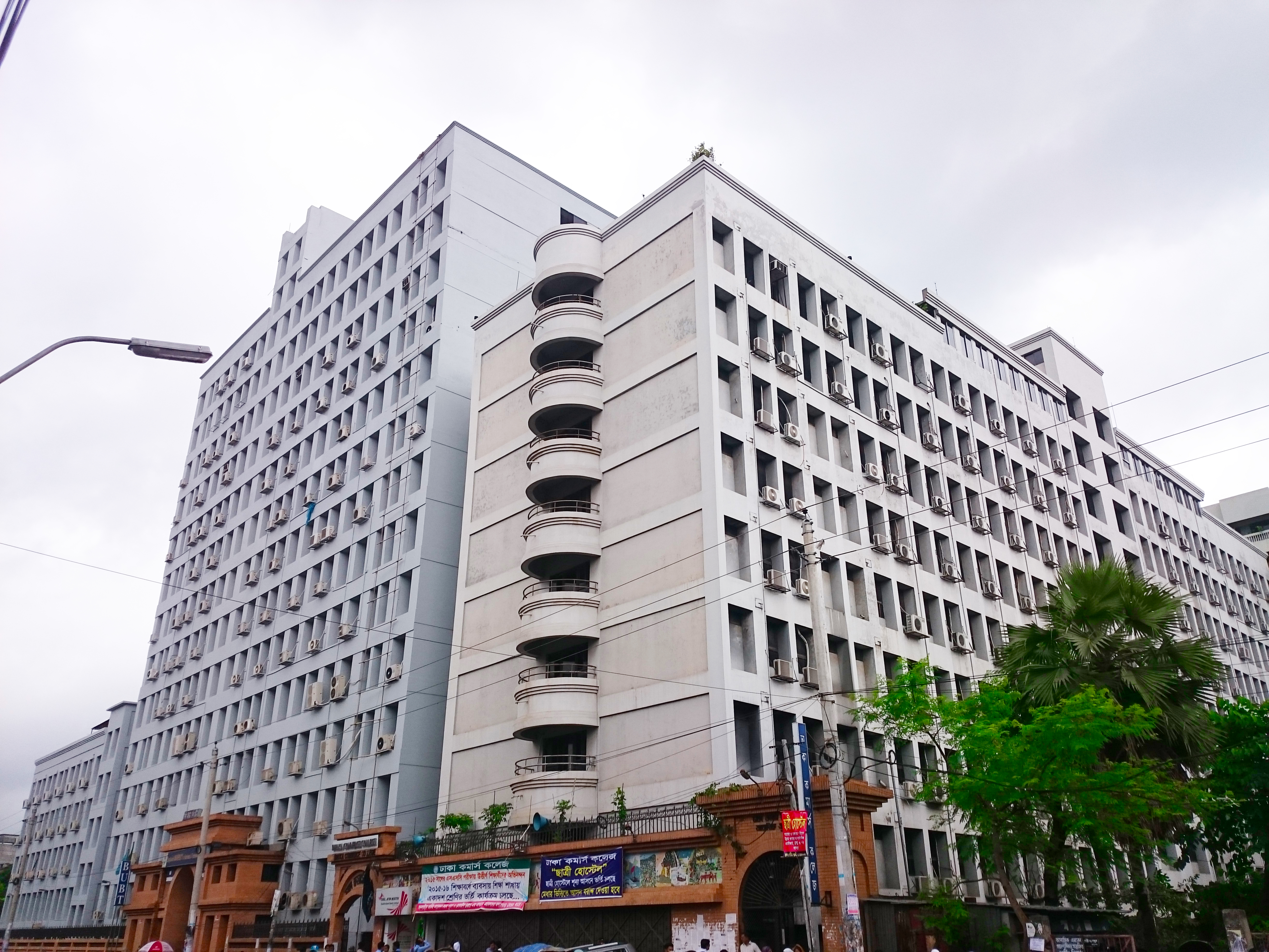
- DCC Building
- Other names: DCC, Commerce College
- Motto: Self Financed, Free from Politics & Smoking.
- Type: Private
- Established: 1989
- Founder: Kazi Nurul Islam Faruky
- Affiliations: National University
- Chairman: Mr. Bijan Kanti Sarkar
- Principal: Professor Dr. Kazi Fayz Ahamed
- Academic staff: 130+
- Administrative staff: 115+
- Students: 8000+
- Location: Dhaka Commerce College Road, Mirpur 2, Dhaka, Bangladesh; 23.8064°N 90.3522°E
- Campus: Urban, 12.36 acres (5.00 ha)
- Language: Bangla and English
- Colors: Aero and Navy Blue
- Website: dcc.edu.bd

Dhaka Commerce College (Bengali: ঢাকা কমার্স কলেজ) is a master's level college in Mirpur, Dhaka, Bangladesh. Established in 1989, it was the first college in Dhaka city to specialize in business studies. Students receive education both in Bengali and English mediums. The main founder of this college is considered Kazi Nurul Islam Faruky.

Also known as DCC, Dhaka Commerce College was awarded as the best private college in Bangladesh in 2015, 2016, 2017, 2019 and 2023. The Higher Secondary science course started in the 2019–20 session.

== History ==
The Dhaka Commerce College project implementation committee was established in 1986 to create a specialized institution for business studies. Led by Kazi Md. Nurul Islam Faruky, associate professor in the Department of Management at Dhaka College, the committee also included ABM Abul Quashem, then education inspector, as co-convener. Additional members were M. Helal, editor of the monthly University Campus, and S.R. Mojumdar, lecturer in the Department of Management at Dhaka College, with Mahfuzul Haque Shahin serving as the member secretary.

The college officially opened on 1 July 1989, initially operating from King Khaled Institute in Lalmatia, Dhaka. It then moved to a rented site in Dhanmondi 8/A before relocating to its permanent campus on Bangladesh National Zoo Road, Mirpur, on 22 January 1995. Shamsul Huda was the first principal, followed by Kazi Md. Nurul Islam Faruky, who served from August 1990 to September 2010. ABM Abul Quashem then became acting principal, and since March 2012, Md. Abu Sayeed has been leading the institution.

In the 1994-95 session, the college expanded its offerings to include honours and master's programs with approval from the National University. Four-year BBA professional courses were introduced in the 1997-98 session. Today, Dhaka Commerce College offers business studies at the higher secondary level, along with undergraduate and postgraduate programs in management, accounting, marketing, finance & banking, English, and economics.

== Academics ==
The college educates from HSC level to post graduate level. There are twelve departments in the college. Course offering includes the higher secondary course and a broad range of postgraduate courses in accounting, economics, English, finance, management, marketing, statistics and Bangla. Also, the BBA, MBA and the CSE courses are added to the college. In the 2019 - 2020 session, Dhaka Commerce College started a higher secondary (HSC) course on science. - Ongoing course:

- HSC: Business Studies and Science (Bangla & English Version)
- Honour's
- Master's
- BBA
- MBA

Honour's and master's course:

- Bangla
- English
- Marketing
- Finance and Banking
- Accounting
- Management
- Economics
- BBA Professional
- CSE Honour's
- MBA Professional

=== Performance ===
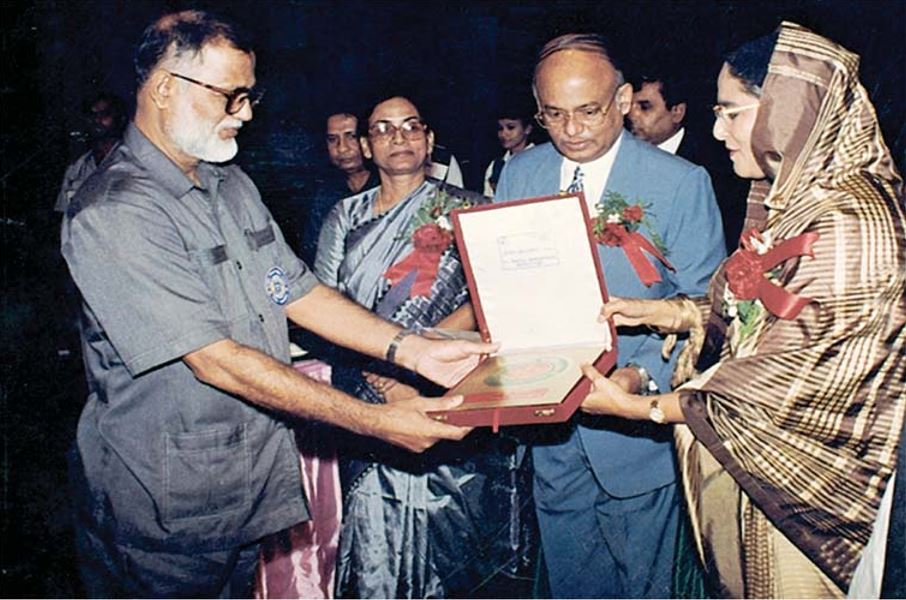
Principal Kazi Md. Nurul Islam Faruky, honorary professor and founder of Dhaka Commerce College, is receiving crest and certificate on behalf of the college from the Prime Minister Sheikh Hasina as the best college in the education week 1996.

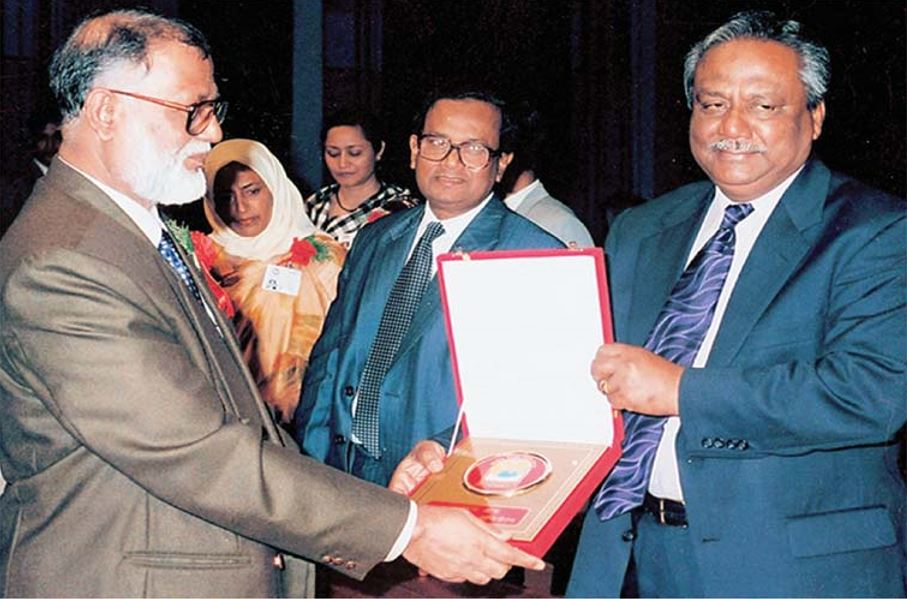
DCC Founder receiving crest and certificate on behalf of the college from the Education Minister M. Osman Faruk for becoming the best college for the second time in the education week 2002.

After its founding, it soon became known for its strict rules and regulations. The students call it Dhaka Central Cell. From its beginning, it has been maintaining high-quality standards. It got the medal of the best college two times in 1996 and 2002.

Since it began, Dhaka Commerce College has placed in the top 10 colleges in the country in terms of HSC results. The National University (NU) listed Dhaka Commerce College in the top five colleges as the best among 685 in the country for their outstanding performances. Dhaka Commerce College ranks 1st among all private college in 2015, 2016, 2017, 2018 and 2023 Dhaka Commerce College's results in the Dhaka Board for Higher Secondary Certificate level examinations are:

Dhaka Commerce College Gate

Year	Number of examinees	Number of passes	GPA-5	Position in Dhaka Board	Ref.
2003	847	842			
2004	897	895	53		
2005	904	904	71	1st position	
2006	1437	1436	227	6th position	
2007	1505	1500	224	7th position	
2008	1924	1923	518	4th position	
2009	1815	1814	409	5th position	
2010	2026	2022	423		
2011	2043	2042	831		
2012	2446	2443	1155		
2013	1940	1930	871		
2014	2185	2179	819		
2015	2120	2108	330		
2016	2569	2546	343		
2017	1900	1890	133		
2018	2220	2215	124		
2019	2149	2131	98		
2020	1490	1490	154		
2021	2393	2386	977		
2022	2802	2795	1720		
2023	3200	3175	352		
