= Uttar Bangla College =

College in Bangladesh

- উত্তর বাংলা কলেজ
- Motto: শিক্ষাই শক্তি
- Motto in English: Knowledge Is Power
- Type: Private
- Established: July 7, 1994; 31 years ago
- Founders: Prof. Mozammel Huq
- Affiliations: Dinajpur Board; National University
- Principal: Dr. Md. Abdur Rouf Sarker
- Academic staff: 168
- Administrative staff: 38
- Students: 3527
- Undergraduates: 2453
- Postgraduates: 118
- Other students: 956
- Location: Kakina, Kaliganj, Lalmonirhat, 5520, Bangladesh
- Campus: 10.20 acres (4.13 ha); Rural Area
- Language: Bengali
- Nickname: UBC
- Website: www.ubc.edu.bd

Uttar Bangla College (abbreviated UBC) is an MPO accredited private college in Bangladesh. This college ranked fourth among government and private colleges of Rangpur Division as per National University performance ranking 2017.

In addition, according to the List of National Universities 2017, it is ranked third among the best five private colleges in the country. Meanwhile, the College ranked fifth among public and private colleges in Rangpur Division in the National University College Performance Ranking 2016 and sixth in the same category in the same division in 2015.

== History ==
Uttar Bangla College was established by economist Dr Mozammel Haq on 7 July 1994. Silver Jubilee was celebrated on 26 December 2019 to mark 25 years of Uttar Bangla College.

=== All Principals List ===
Serial No.	Name	Title	Qualifications	Start	End
1	Md Khurshidul Alam	Principal	Bss (Hons.), MSS (Economics)	4 September 1994	28 April 2001
2	Md. Mahfuzul Islam	Principal (in-charge)	BA (Hons.), MA (Bangla)	29 April 2001	17 March 2002
1	Dr. Abu Shahadat	Principal (in-charge)	BA (Hons.), MA (Bangla), Ph. D. (India)	18 March 2002	11 April 2004
5	Dr. ASM Monowarul Islam	Principal	Bss (Hons.), MSS (Political Science), LLB, PGDM, MD, Ph. D.(India)	12 April 2004	31 December 2020
৫	A.K.M Monsurul Islam	Principal (in-charge))	B. Sc. (Hons.), M. Sc. (Botany), M. Ed.	1 January 2021	13 December 2021
৬	Dr. Md. Abdur Rouf	Principal	B. Sc. (Hons.), M. Sc. (Nuclear Physics), M. Ed.	14 December 2021	Present

== Location ==
The college is located besides Kakina-Sukandighi road, in Kaliaganj upazila, Lalmonirhat district.

== Courses ==
Uttar Bangla College offers courses for Undergraduate Degree, Undergraduate Degree (General), Postgraduate Degree, HSC, HSC(BM).

Bachelor's degree courses offered are BA, BSS, B. Sc. and BBS. Bachelor's degree Honours Courses offered are Bengali, English, History, Islamic History & Culture, Philosophy, Political Science, Social Science, Economics, Marketing, Accountancy, Management, Botany, Zoologi, Psychology, Statistics and Mathematics. Master's degree courses are Bengali, English, Philosophy, Political Science, Social Science, Economics, Accountancy, Management and Psychology.

In HSC (General), there are 150 seats in Science stream, 190 in Humanities an 150 in Commerce stream, total 490 seats in HSC. In HSC (BM) courses offered are Accountancy, Secretarial Science, Computer Operations and Entrepreneurship Development and Banking.
