= Dinajpur Government College =

College in Bangladesh

Coordinates: 25.6489°N 88.6449°E

- Former names: Ripon College; Surendranath College
- Motto: Education is power
- Type: Government College
- Established: July 1, 1942; 84 years ago
- Affiliations: National University
- Principal: Professor MD. Lutfor Rahman
- Students: 21,144
- Undergraduates: 14,059
- Postgraduates: 5,420
- Other students: 1,665
- Location: Dinajpur, Bangladesh
- Campus: 65 acres (26 ha); City
- Nickname: DGC
- Website: dgc.edu.bd
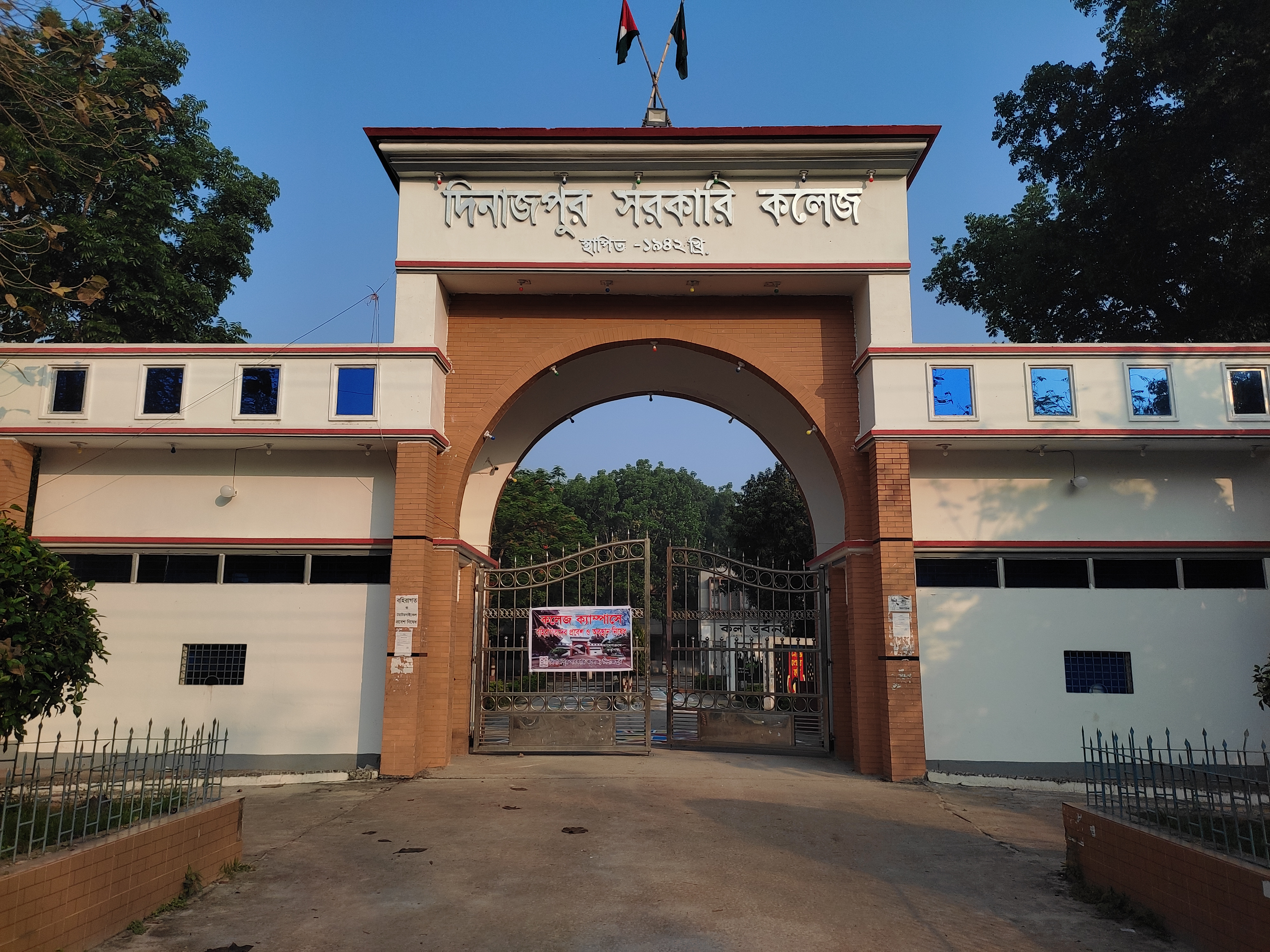

Dinajpur Government College (Bengali: দিনাজপুর সরকারি কলেজ) is a government college located in Dinajpur.

== History ==
The college was initially established in 1942 at Maharaja Girijanath High School in Dinajpur as a branch of Ripon College, Kolkata. During that time, Professor Amarendra Kumar Thakur and Mr. K. C. Banerjee successively served as the administrators of the college. Shortly after the partition of the subcontinent in 1948, the 'Ripon College' branch was renamed to Surendranath College (S.N. College). In 1953, the college's own building was constructed on 13 acres of land in the Nimnagar Balubari area of Dinajpur city, and the institution was relocated there. The internationally renowned philosopher and educationist Dr. Govinda Chandra Dev (G. C. Dev) was the founding principal of Surendranath College.

In the 1966–1967 academic year, Surendranath College was relocated from Nimnagar Balubari (which currently houses Dinajpur Government Women's College) to a new campus spread across approximately 65 acres in the Suihari area, north of the city. At that time, it became known as Dinajpur Degree College. Following its provincialization on April 15, 1968, the institution officially became known as Dinajpur Government College.

The college initially conducted its academic activities under the University of Calcutta, later transitioning to the University of Dhaka and the University of Rajshahi. Currently, it operates under the affiliation of the National University.

== Faculties and Departments ==
The current faculties, departments, and courses offered at the college are as follows:

=== Higher Secondary Certificate (HSC) ===
- Science
- Humanities
- Business Studies

=== Degree (Pass) ===
- B.A. (Pass)
- B.S.S. (Pass)
- B.B.S. (Pass)
- B.Sc. (Pass)

=== Bachelor's (Honours) and Master's ===
Faculty	Department	Bachelor's (Honours)	Master's Final	Master's Preliminary
Faculty of Science	Physics	Yes	Yes	Yes
Faculty of Science	Chemistry	Yes	Yes	Yes
Faculty of Science	Mathematics	Yes	Yes	Yes
Faculty of Life and Earth Sciences	Botany	Yes	Yes	Yes
Faculty of Life and Earth Sciences	Zoology	Yes	Yes	Yes
Faculty of Social Science	Sociology	Yes	Yes	Yes
Faculty of Social Science	Economics	Yes	Yes	Yes
Faculty of Social Science	Political Science	Yes	Yes	Yes
Faculty of Arts	Bengali	Yes	Yes	Yes
Faculty of Arts	English	Yes	Yes	Yes
Faculty of Arts	History	Yes	Yes	Yes
Faculty of Arts	Philosophy	Yes	Yes	Yes
Faculty of Arts	Islamic History and Culture	Yes	Yes	No
Faculty of Business Studies	Accounting	Yes	Yes	Yes
Faculty of Business Studies	Management	Yes	Yes	Yes

== Notable Faculty ==
- Govinda Chandra Dev (February 1, 1907 – March 26, 1971) – He was a professor of philosophy at the University of Dhaka and served as the founding principal of Dinajpur Government College.

== Library ==
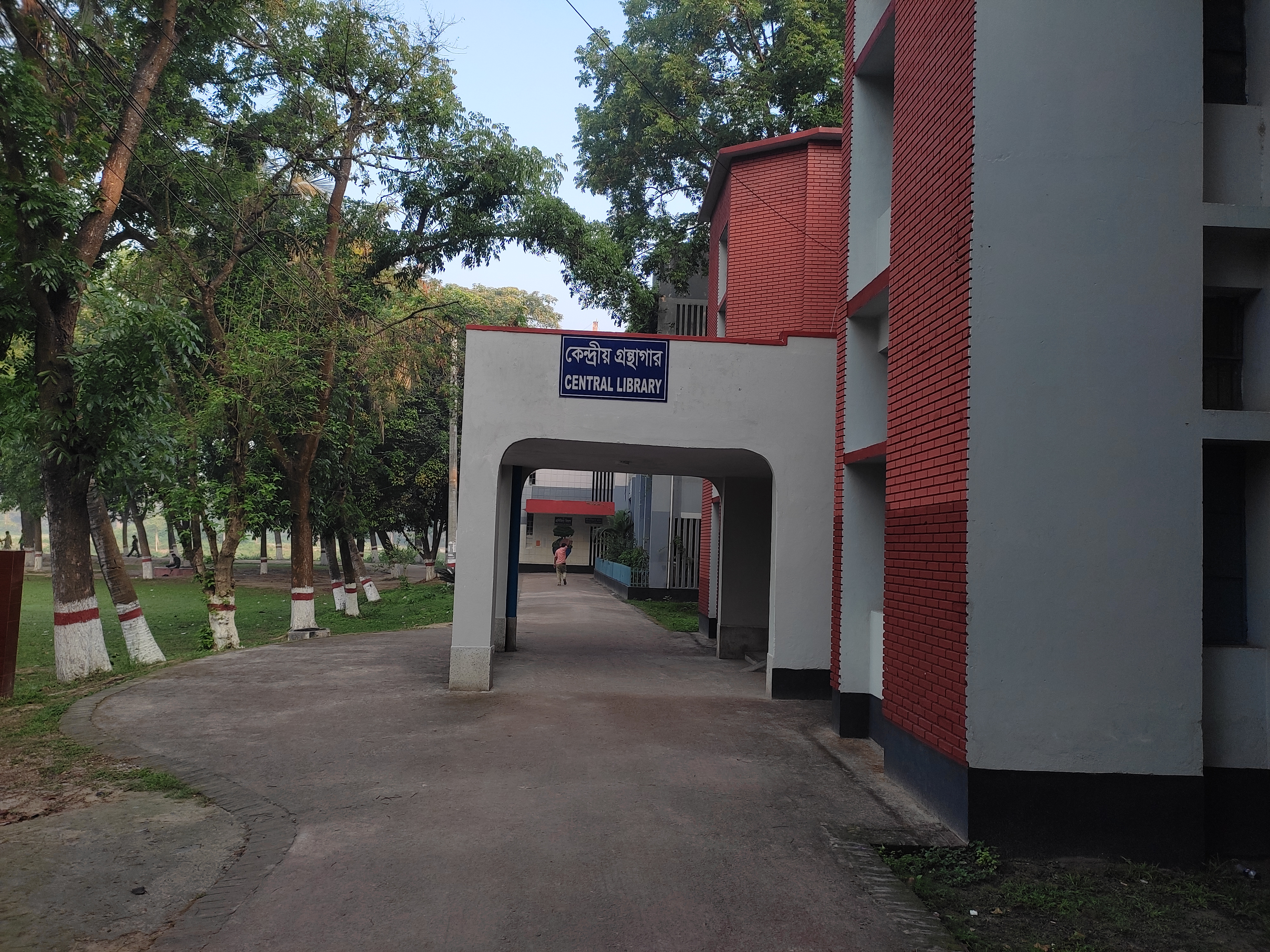
Central library

The library of Dinajpur College was established in 1942 at the time of establishment of the college. There are 30,000 books in the library. Every department has a library of their own. Various kinds of cultural and educational plans are also held in library.

== Residential Halls ==
Dinajpur Government College has a total of six residential halls for its students, comprising three halls for male students and three for female students.

Male Hostels:

- Main Hostel
- Muslim Hall
- Shaheed Ajoy Hall (Hindu Hostel)

Female Hostels:

- Female Hall No. 1
- Female Hall No. 2
- Female Hall No. 3 (Formerly known as Sheikh Fazilatunnesa Hall)

== Principal's Residence ==
The official residence of the Principal is located in the Nimnagar Balubari area of the city (adjacent to Dinajpur Government Women's College).

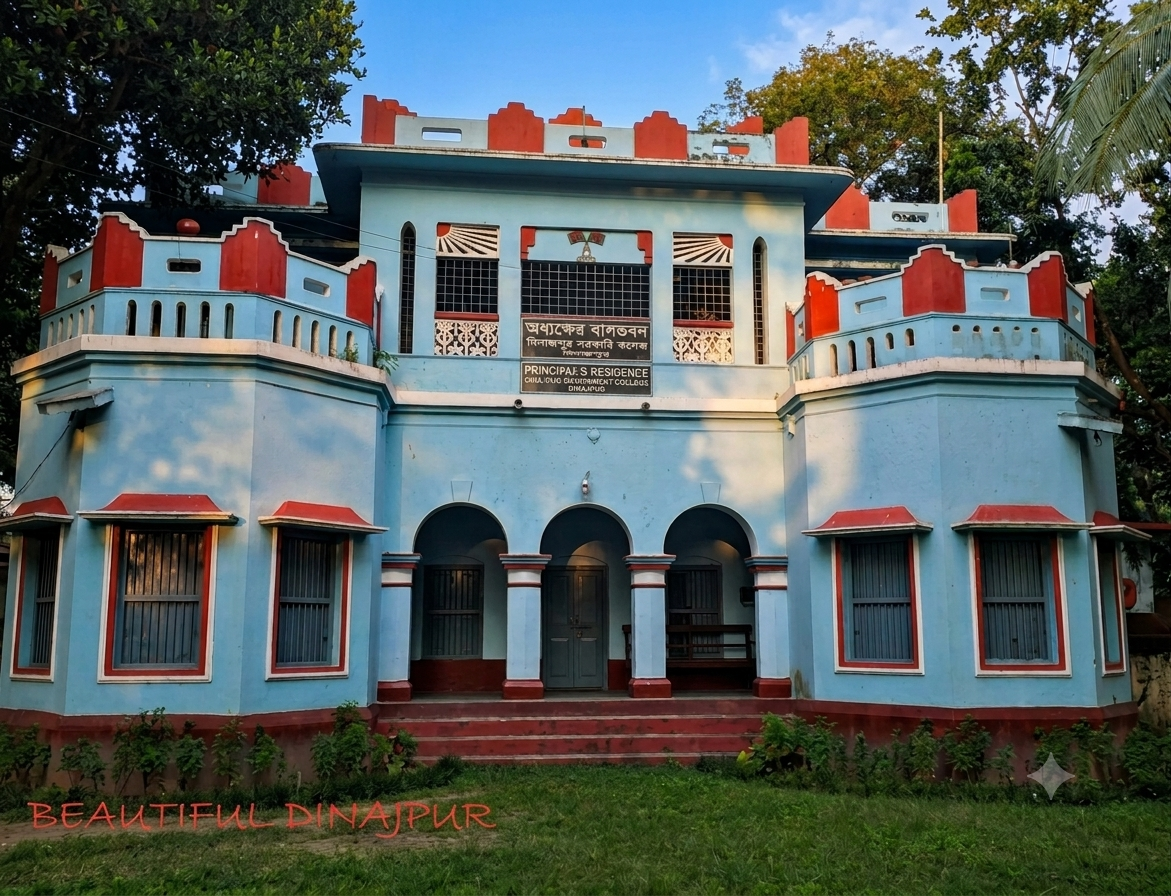
Residence of the Principal

== Co-Education ==
Dinajpur Government College has several active organizations for students to engage in social and co-curricular activities. Notable among them are:

- Green Voice
- Bangladesh Red Crescent Society
- Bangladesh National Cadet Corps (BNCC)
- Badhan (Voluntary Blood Donors' Organization)
- Bashundhara Shuvosangho
- English Language Club

== Post Office ==
There is a sub-town post office located within the college campus to facilitate communication and official work for students, teachers, and the general public. It is officially known as Dinajpur Government College Sub-Town Post Office (Postal Code: 5202).

== Transportation ==
Dinajpur Government College has its own transportation system to facilitate student commuting and administrative tasks. The bus currently used for student transportation was provided as a gift by the former Prime Minister Sheikh Hasina. In addition, the college authority manages a microbus for official activities and an SUV for the Principal's official use. However, compared to the large student population, the existing bus service is highly limited and insufficient to meet the commuting needs of all students.

== Results and Ranking ==
In a notification published by the Secondary and Higher Education Division in 2025, Dinajpur Government College ranked 22nd in the 'A' category among government colleges in Bangladesh.

In the 2018 National University College Ranking, it was recognized as one of the top ten colleges in the Rangpur region.
