= Yusuf Ali Mollah =

Bangladeshi professor and educator

- ইউসুফ আলী মোল্লা

Acting Chairman, University Grants Commission
- In office 8 May 2019 – 22 May 2019
- Succeeded by: Kazi Shahidullah

Personal details
- Education: University of Dhaka; Macquarie University
- Occupation: university academic, professor

Mohammad Yousuf Ali Mollah is a Bangladeshi professor and educator. He served as the acting chairman of University Grants Commission of Bangladesh (UGC) in May 2019.

== Early life ==
Mollah graduated in chemistry from Dhaka University in 1969. He completed his post graduation in physical-inorganic chemistry from the same university in 1970. He received his Ph.D. in chemistry from Macquarie University in 1979.

== Career ==
Mollah was a lecturer at the chemistry department of Jahangirnagar University from March 1972 to March 1975. He joined the chemistry department of Dhaka University in June 1981 as an assistant professor and he was made professor in July 1993. He also serves as dean of the faculty of science.

Before assuming the post of chairman, Mollah was one of the full-time members of UGC. He was selected as a full-time member on 28 May 2015. He was appointed by the Ministry of Education as chairman on 8 May 2019.
