= Md. Mashiur Rahman =

Vice-Chancellor of National University, Bangladesh

- মো. মশিউর রহমান
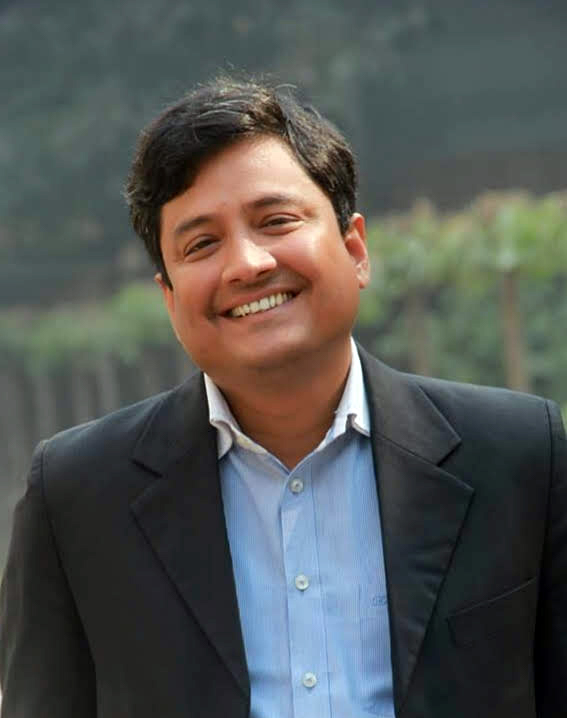

Vice-Chancellor of the National University, Bangladesh
- In office 31 May 2021 – 11 August 2024
- Preceded by: Harun-or-Rashid
- Succeeded by: A. S. M. Amanullah

Personal details
- Born: 15 July 1973 (age 52) Jhalokati District, Bangladesh
- Education: Ph.D.
- Alma mater: Lund University; University of Dhaka

Md. Mashiur Rahman is a Bangladeshi academic and a former Vice-Chancellor of National University, Bangladesh during 2021–2024. In September 2022, the government broke the trustee board of Manarat International University and created a new board which included Rahman.

== Early life ==
Rahman was born in Nalchity Upazila, Jhalokathi District. did his undergraduate and graduate studies in sociology at the University of Dhaka. He did his doctorate and post doctorate work at Lund University.

== Career ==
Rahman started teaching at the Department of Sociology of the University of Chittagong. He later joined the sociology department at the University of Dhaka. He went on to become a professor at the department.

On 10 May 2017, Rahman was appointed Pro-Vice Chancellor of the National University.

Rahman was appointed the Vice-Chancellor of the National University on 30 May 2021 replacing Harun-or-Rashid.
