= A. S. M. Amanullah =

Vice-Chancellor of National University, Bangladesh

- এ এস এম আমানুল্লাহ
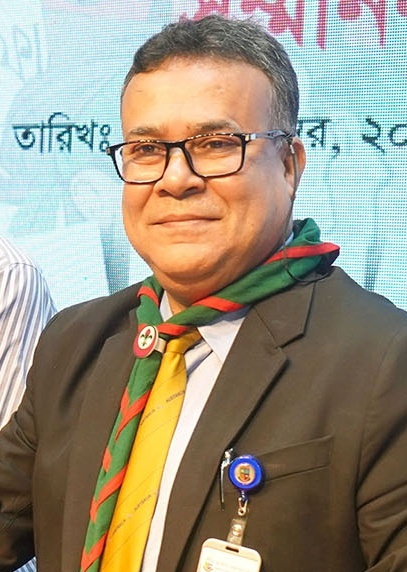
- Amanullah in 2025

Vice-Chancellor of the National University
- Incumbent
- Assumed office 28 August 2024
- Chancellor: Mirza Fakhrul Islam Alamgir
- Preceded by: Md. Mashiur Rahman

Personal details
- Born: 9 February 1965 (age 61)
- Education: PhD
- Alma mater: University of Dhaka; University of New South Wales

A. S. M. Amanullah (born 9 February 1965) is a Bangladeshi sociologist. He currently serves as a professor in the Department of Sociology at Dhaka University and is the Vice-Chancellor of the National University, Bangladesh.

== Early life ==
Amanullah completed his Bachelor of Social Science (BSS) with honors and his Master of Social Science (MSS) degrees, both with first-class distinction, from the Department of Sociology at Dhaka University. He earned his PhD from the University of New South Wales in 2002.

== Career ==
Amanullah began his academic career in 1993 as a lecturer in the Department of Sociology at Shahjalal University of Science and Technology. In 1994, he joined the Department of Sociology at Dhaka University, where he currently holds a professorship. Additionally, he has taught at Independent University, Bangladesh, and North South University. He has also served as Advisor and Program Director for the Master of Public Health (MPH) and Applied Sociology programs at ASA University Bangladesh. His academic contributions extend to collaboration with various non-governmental organizations (NGOs). Under his theoretical guidance and academic leadership, the Government of Bangladesh incorporated a separate chapter on HIV and AIDS into the national curriculum for secondary and higher secondary education, technical education, religious education, and non-formal education sectors. He has published many original articles and research reports in scholarly journals. He is linked to the pro-Bangladesh Nationalist Party white panel at the University of Dhaka.

== Research and Publications ==
Prof. ASM Amanullah has conducted research in public health, medical sociology, HIV/AIDS, STD/STI, and population studies. He has contributed to over 170 development research projects as Principal Investigator (PI), Co-PI, or Consultant, and has published over 100 scholarly articles, books, chapters, and conference papers. His work includes studies on HIV/AIDS prevention, medical sociology, sexual and reproductive health rights (SRHR), and health vulnerabilities among migrants. Notable works include:

- Amanullah, A.S.M., Biswas, A., & Santra, S.C. (2011). "Medical waste management in the tertiary hospitals of Bangladesh: an empirical enquiry." ASA University Review, 5(2), 149–158.
- Amanullah, A.S.M., Islam, S., & Khan, M.I. (2007). "Exposure to Media and HIV/AIDS-Related Risk Practices among Adolescents and Youths in Bangladesh: A Sociological Study."
- Amanullah, A.S.M. (2006). "Gender and Human Resources for Health in South Asia: Challenges and Constraints." UGC-CIDA, Dhaka. ISBN 984-809-036-3.

== Awards and honors ==
Prof. A. S. M. Amanullah has received recognition for his contributions to public health and sociology research:

- "Best Medical Contribution Award" – awarded by World Top Scientists in recognition of his significant contributions to medical research.
- "Medical Researcher Award" – conferred by World Top Scientists for his outstanding research in medical sociology.

On 28 August 2024, A. S. M. Amanullah was appointed Vice-Chancellor of the National University, Bangladesh.
