= Govt. Begum Rokeya College, Rangpur =

Govt. College in Rangpur, Bangladesh

Coordinates: 25.749°N 89.262°E

- সরকারি বেগম রোকেয়া কলেজ
- Other name: Begum Rokeya Women's College
- Type: Public Women's college
- Established: March 19, 1963; 63 years ago
- Academic affiliations: National University; Dinajpur Education Board (HSC)
- Principal: Ismail Hossain Sarker
- Academic staff: 48
- Students: 7,084
- Undergraduates: 4,585
- Postgraduates: 511
- Other students: 1,988 (HSC)
- Location: Purboshalbon, Rangpur, 5404, Bangladesh
- Campus: 7.28 acres (2.95 ha); Urban
- Language: Bengali
- Website: www.gbrcr.gov.bd
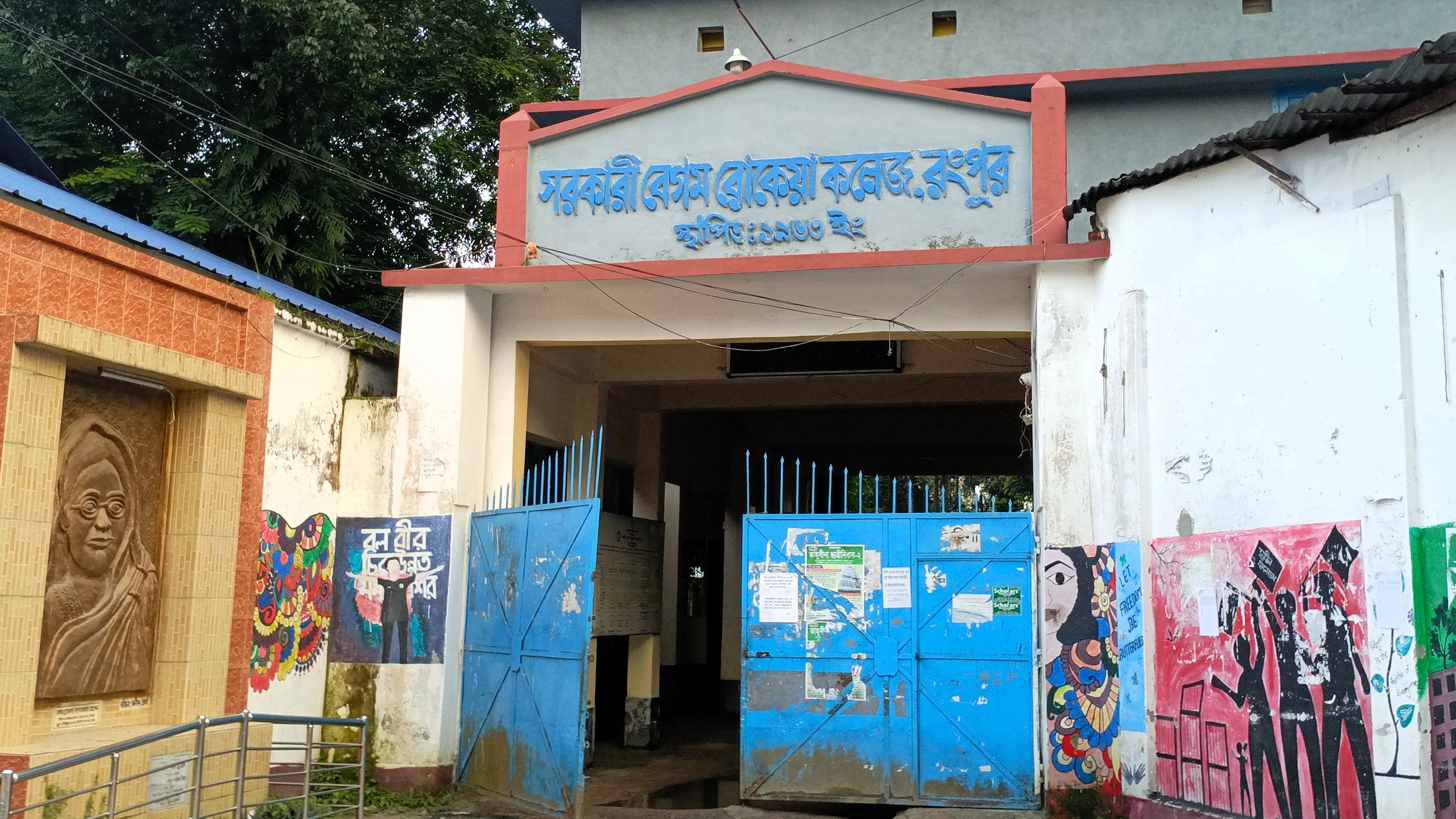

Govt. Begum Rokeya College, Rangpur is a public women's college located in Purbo Shalban, Rangpur, Bangladesh. It is also known as Begum Rokeya Women's College. Currently, the institution offers Higher Secondary, Bachelor's Degree (Pass), Bachelor's Degree (Honors), and Master's Final courses. All seats are reserved for women.

== History ==
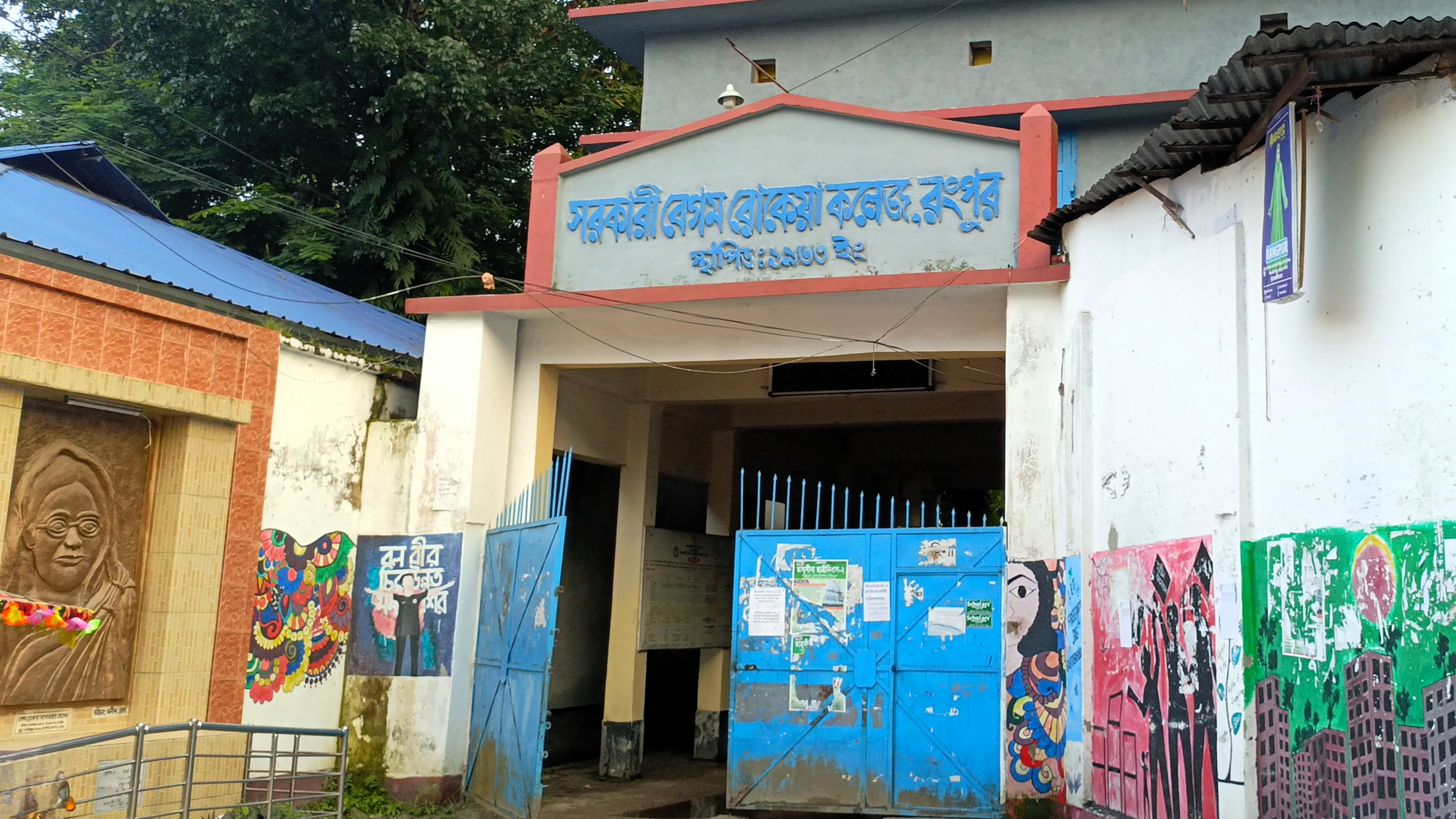
Govt. Begum Rokeya College, Rangpur

Begum Rokeya College was established on March 19, 1963, with the aim of expanding women's education in the Rangpur region. In a meeting of the governing committee, the name Begum Rokeya College was officially approved. The college is built on 3.66 acres of land, which was formerly an abandoned property of a landlord named Borda Sundari.

Initially, the institution started as a private college, offering Degree (Pass) courses along with Higher Secondary courses in Science and Humanities. Later, on May 7, 1979, the college was nationalized. In 1985, University of Rajshahi granted approval to introduce Honors courses in six subjects: Bengali, English, Economics, Philosophy, Political Science, and Islamic History & Culture. Subsequently, in 1995, the National University approved the introduction of the Master's final year courses in these subjects.

== Academic Programs ==
=== Higher Secondary ===
- Science
- Humanities
- Commerce

=== Bachelor's Degree (Pass) Courses ===
- B.A. (Pass)
- B.S.S. (Pass)
- B.Sc. (Pass)

=== Bachelor's Degree (Honors) Courses ===
- Department of Bengali
- Department of English
- Department of Islamic History & Culture
- Department of Philosophy
- Department of Political Science
- Department of Economics

=== Master's Final Courses ===
- Department of Bengali
- Department of English
- Department of Islamic History & Culture
- Department of Philosophy
- Department of Political Science
- Department of Economics

== Ranking ==
In 2015, 2016, 2017, 2018, it was recognized as one of the top ten colleges in the Rangpur region in the National University college ranking.

== See also ==
- Begum Rokeya University, Rangpur
- Rangpur Government College
