= Government Tolaram College =

Government college in Bangladesh

Coordinates: 23.6231°N 90.4973°E

- সরকারি তোলারাম কলেজ
- Motto: জ্ঞানই আলো, সত্যই লক্ষ্য
- Motto in English: Knowledge is light, Truth is aim
- Type: Public
- Established: 1937; 89 years ago (as Narayanganj Women College) 1948; 78 years ago (as Tolaram College)
- Founder: Khagendro Nath Chokroborti
- Accreditation: Dhaka Education Board
- Affiliations: National University of Bangladesh
- Principal: Professor Md. Shahidul Islam
- Students: 22,184
- Undergraduates: 13,597
- Postgraduates: 2,995
- Other students: 5,552 (HSC)
- Location: Chashara, Narayanganj, 1400, Bangladesh
- Campus: 3.04 acres (1.23 ha); Urban
- Language: Bangla
- Website: tolaramcollege.edu.bd

Government Tolaram College (Bengali: সরকারি তোলারাম কলেজ) also known as TC/GTC is a higher educational institution of Bangladesh located at the center of Narayanganj City near Chashara. It was founded in 1937 as a girls' college by Khagendro Nath Chokroborti, who also served as its first principal. The college had an initial intake of only five female students. The college offers Honor's and Master's program and is governed under the authority of the National University of Bangladesh. It also has Higher Secondary Certificate (HSC).

== History ==
In 1937, famous educationist Khagendra Nath Chakraborty of Narayanganj established Tolaram College as a Girls' College. He was the founder principal of this college. At its inception, he started classes with just five female students. In order to establish an educational institution, Khagendra Nath visited Danbir 'Randa Prasad Saha' of Mirzapur in present day Tangail district of Greater Mymensingh. On hearing about the education-related plans, Randa Prasad Saha donated twenty-five thousand rupees for the college. After that,'Madan Lal Saraogi', son of Tolaram Bachhraj, a jute merchant of Narayanganj, also donated twenty five thousand rupees for the establishment of the college. With this money Khagendra Nath built 'Narayanganj Women's College'. The girls' college was closed when World War II broke out.

After the war, Khagendra Nath took the initiative to start the college again. He was supported by education promoter and philanthropist 'Madan Lal Saraogi', son of jute merchant Tolaram Bachhraj, who donated one lakh rupees to build the college. 'Tolaram College' was started in the abandoned gymnasium of Narayanganj High School in 1945 and named after the donor. Classes started in the present campus in 1956 after purchasing a piece land on 'Allama Iqbal Road' and constructing a one storied building. The building was inaugurated by the then Chief Minister of East Bengal 'Abu Hussain Sarkar'. The founder and principal of the college was Khagendranath Chakraborty. The original multi-storied building of the present college was constructed in 1963 AD. With a donation of 1.5 lakh rupees from RP Saha (Randaprasad Saha), the science laboratory of Tolaram College was built and necessary equipments were purchased.

Tolaram College was the first outside Dhaka to get approval from Dhaka University in 1946. Since the 1960s, Tolaram College has been running an evening department for working students. In 1974, the operation of the night department was stopped. From the very beginning, the final examination results of the students of this college were also satisfactory

In 1956, the students of 'Tolaram College' visited India and Pakistan. In 1966, college students staged plays 'Shahjahan' and 'Mahua' at 'Diamond Cinema Hall'. In 1963 'Chhatrasansaad' gained fame by publishing daily magazine and annual magazine. A sensational science fair was held in this college in 1969.

Abdul Awal, a graduate student of Tolaram College, was martyred in the Liberation War.

The college was nationalized on March 1, 1980. With the efforts and cooperation of former student of Tolaram College and former Member of Parliament Mr. Shamim Osman, Honors in 12 subjects and MA courses in 05 subjects were opened in Government Tolaram College in 1996-97 session. On his announcement, the art building of the college was named "Shaheed Janani Jahanara Imam Bhavan". Presently the college offers HSC, BA (Pass), Honors in 14 subjects, M.A. first part in 05 subjects and M.A. final part in 14 subjects. At present the number of students studying in 'Government Tolaram College' is about 18000.

Government Tolaram College' also has co-educational program. The college conducts indoor games, outdoor games, annual milad, annual banquet and educational tours. Rover Scouts, BNCC and Girlsing Rovers of the college regularly participate in various social service activities. Government Tolaram College was awarded as the best college at national level in 1998 due to good results.

== Academic departments ==
The college offers Honours (4-year), Master's (1-year and 2-year), and Higher Secondary Certificate (HSC) courses.

Honours programmes in 12 subjects and master's programmes in 5 subjects were introduced in the 1996–97 academic session. As of 2026, the college offers honours programmes in 14 subjects, Preliminary-to-Masters programmes in 9 subjects, and master's final programmes in 14 subjects.

- Department of Economics
- Department of Bengali
- Department of English
- Department of Physics
- Department of Chemistry
- Department of Mathematics
- Department of Zoology
- Department of Botany
- Department of Accounting
- Department of Management
- Department of Political Science
- Department of Islamic History and Culture
- Department of Philosophy
- Department of Social Work

== Campus ==
Govt. Tolaram College is located on Allama Iqbal Road in central Narayanganj, near Chashara. It includes roughly six academic buildings (administration, science, arts, commerce halls, etc.), plus an auditorium (“Padma Milanayatan”) and student facilities. One on-campus hostel for female students is also maintained. The college library and laboratories are housed in modern blocks. The Science Building, for example, features a prominent sign at its entrance and is a distinct campus landmark.

The entrance gate of Government Tolaram College (with “Shaheed Janoni Jahanara Imam Bhaban” arch) shows the college’s name plaque. Much of the campus architecture dates to the 1950s–60s expansion, with some recent upgrades (e.g. ICT labs and multimedia classrooms) undertaken by the college administration.

== Library ==
There are available Library facility for students. Around 14,500 books are in the library in various department.

=== Residential student halls ===
There are Two (02) residential halls:

- Sher-E-Bangla Boys Hall.(Boys)
- University College abreast Girls Hall.(Girls)

=== Transport ===
Government Tolaram College has four buses to transport students from different areas of Narayanganj city. Previously, the college operated two buses named "Gourob" (গৌরব) and "Orjon" (অর্জন). Recently, two more BRTC buses have been added to the fleet to improve student transportation.
