= Faridpur Central Eidgah =

Eidgah in Faridpur, Bangladesh

Faridpur Central Eidgah (locally known as Chandmari Eidgah Maidan) is the main Eidgah or open space designated for Eid prayers in Faridpur city, Bangladesh. Every year, the congregational prayers for the two major Islamic festivals, Eid-ul-Fitr and Eid-ul-Adha, are held here. People from all walks of life in Faridpur gather at this ground to perform Eid prayers, including the Deputy Commissioner, Superintendent of Police, senior government and private officials, and distinguished personalities. This Eidgah is located in the Chandmari area of the Komlapur neighborhood of Faridpur city and has long served as the central Eidgah of the region. On Eid, it holds special significance as a gathering place for the Muslim community in Faridpur.

== History and Background ==
There is limited historical information regarding the exact establishment or origin of Faridpur Central Eidgah. However, it is known that Eid congregations have been held here for many decades. Locally, the field is known as "Chandmari Eidgah," and it is believed that during British colonial rule, this open space was used as a military training ground (Chandmari), which later evolved into an Eidgah ground. Currently, it is maintained under the ownership of the Faridpur District Council and is sometimes referred to as "District Council Eidgah, Chandmari." For generations, devout Muslims from Faridpur city and surrounding areas have been performing their Eid prayers here, making it a significant part of the religious culture of Faridpur.

== Architecture and Area ==
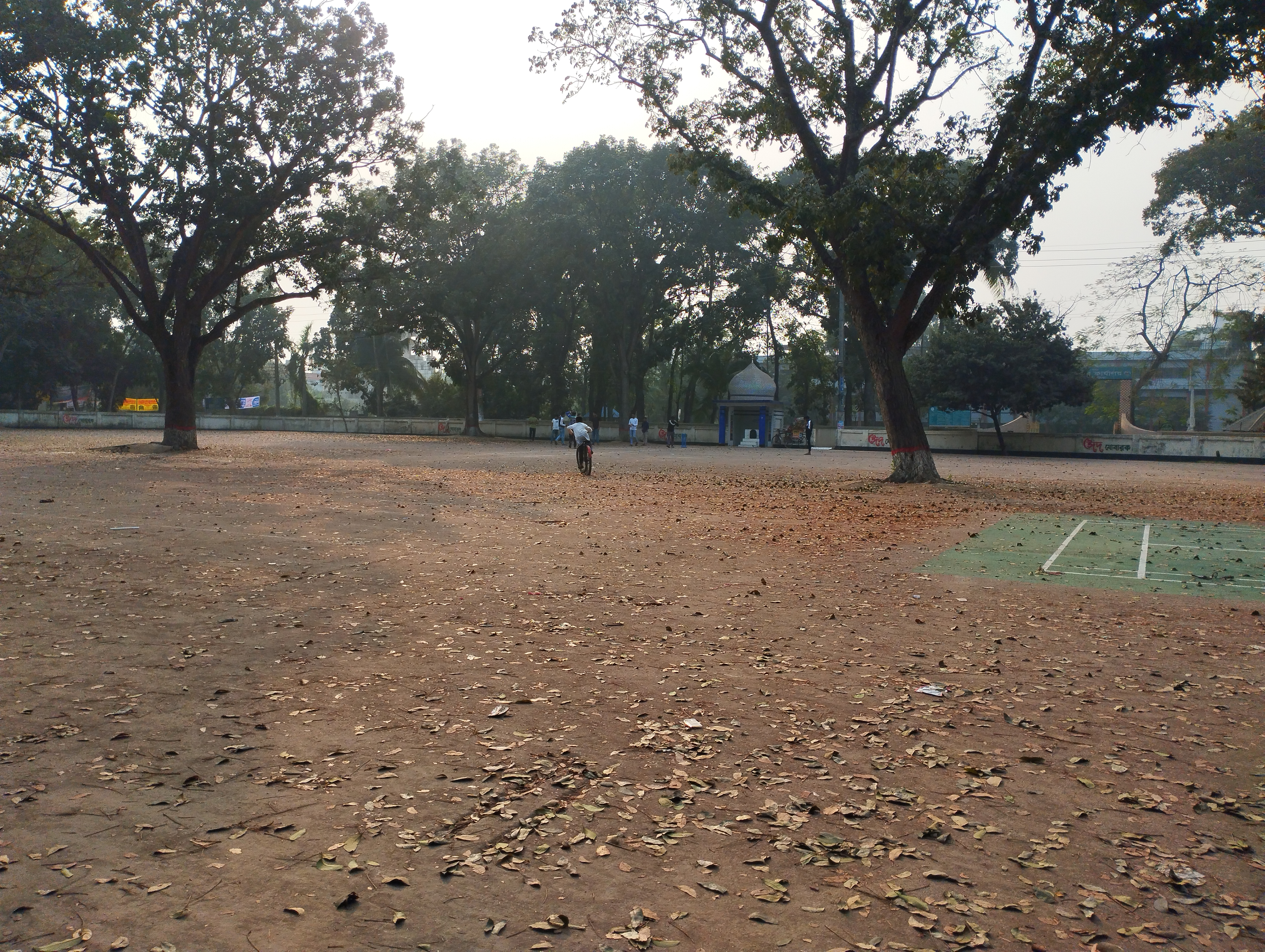
Eidgah Maidan

Faridpur Central Eidgah is essentially a large rectangular open field, enclosed by a low cement boundary wall. The field is surrounded by large shade-providing trees that enhance its natural beauty and provide shelter during the crowded Eid gatherings. On the western side, facing the Qibla in Mecca, a permanent mimbar/mihrab has been built, where the Imam delivers the Eid sermon. The ground is leveled with layers of raw soil and sand, allowing thousands of worshippers to stand in rows for prayer. According to media reports, the Eid congregation at this site attracts a "massive number" of people every year. Before Eid prayers, municipal authorities thoroughly clean the ground, repaint the Qibla-facing wall and mimbar if necessary, and mark prayer rows for proper alignment. For security reasons, gated entrances and doors are installed to regulate the crowd on the day of Eid.
