= Kushtia Government College =

College in Kushtia, Bangladesh

- কুষ্টিয়া সরকারি কলেজ
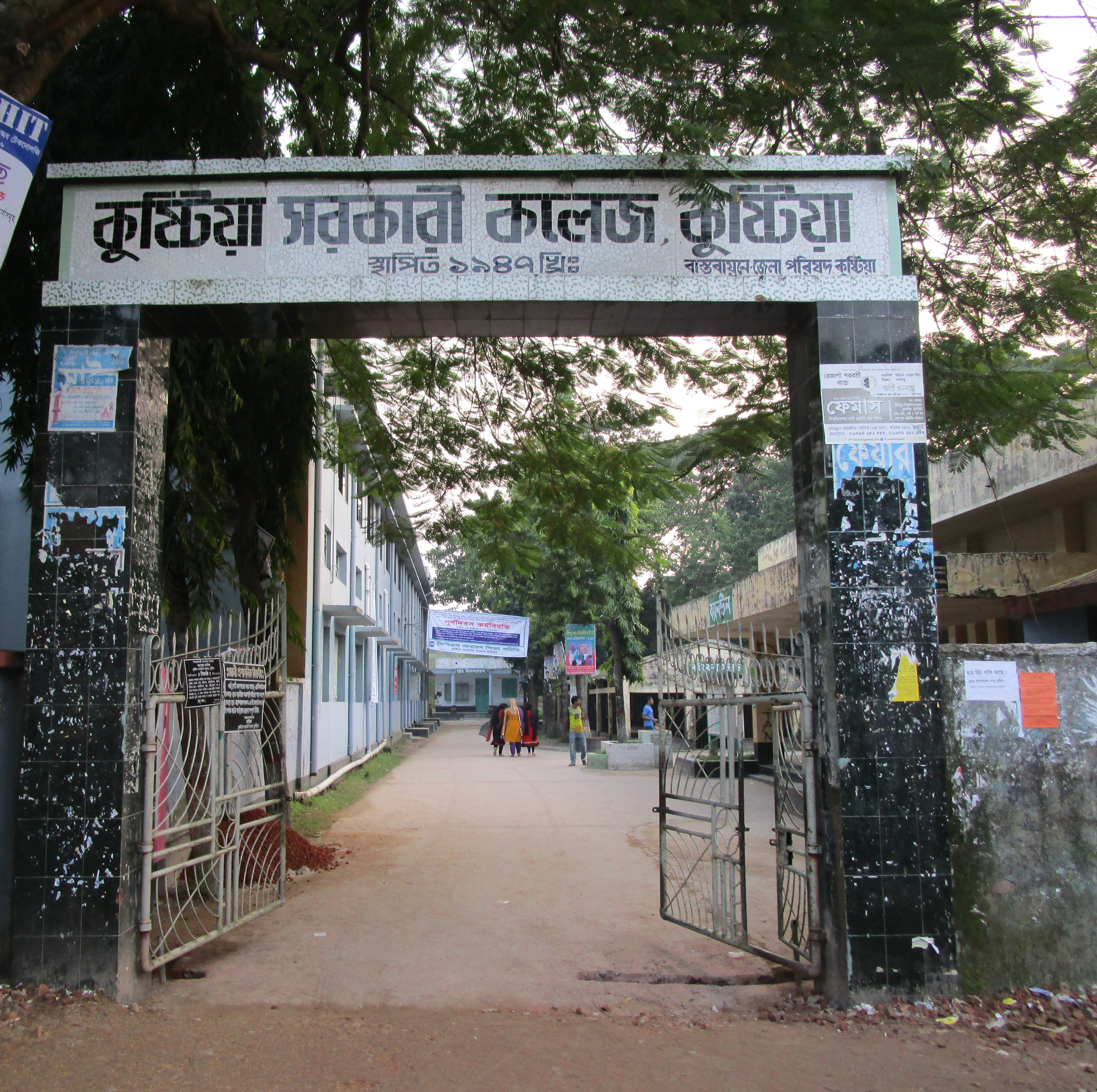
- Main gate of Kushtia Government College
- Type: Government College
- Established: 1947
- Academic affiliations: National University
- Students: 27000+
- Location: Kushtia, Kushtia District, Bangladesh; 23.9031°N 89.1278°E
- Campus: Urban, 26 acres (11 ha)
- Website: kushtiagovcollege.edu.bd

Kushtia Government College (Bengali: কুষ্টিয়া সরকারি কলেজ) is a traditional college in Kushtia District of Bangladesh. The college is located on a 5-acre campus in the city of Kushtia. This college is affiliated with Bangladesh National University. The college was established on 1 January 1948. It is one of the 30 first-class colleges in Bangladesh. Greater Kushtia and the surrounding region. The students and teachers of this college have played a role in the struggle of various movements, from the language movement to the great independence war.

== History of establishment ==
Local educationists and philanthropists established the college on 1 January 1948 for the betterment of education.

== Campus ==
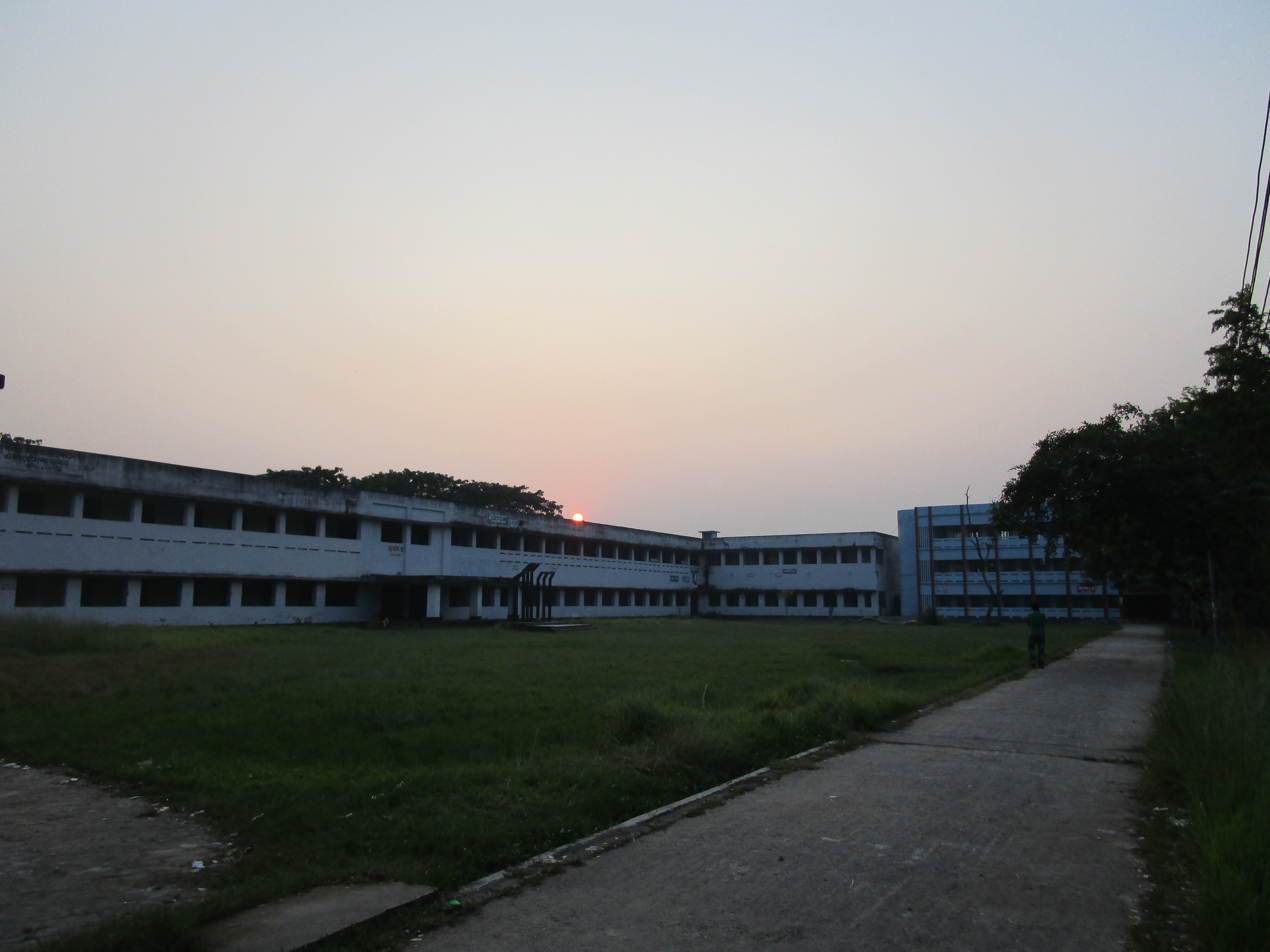
Buildings of Kushtia Govt. College

The college has five acres (2.0 ha) land in total.

The college has more than 22,000 students.

== Departments ==
The college have 19 different departments. Bangali, English, Economics, Politics, Social Science, Philosophy, History, History and Culture of Islam, Islamic Education, Physics, Chemistry, Zoology, Biology, Mathematics, Accounting, Management, Geography and Environment, Statistics, Information and communication technology

Of these, Honors courses are offered in 16 departments and Masters in 11 departments.

In spite those science, humanities and business education groups are at the higher secondary level and science, humanities, social sciences and business education groups in the degree pass courses.

== Hostels ==
One boys hostel and one girls hostel can be found here.

== Sports ==
The college has facilities for cricket and football. There are also carrom and table tennis for the boys.

== Voluntary organizations ==
BNCC, Rover Scout, Red Crescent, Badhon etc.
