= Harun-or-Rashid (academic) =

Bangladeshi academic

- হারুন-অর-রশিদ

Vice-Chancellor of National University, Bangladesh
- In office 6 March 2013 – 5 March 2021
- Preceded by: Kazi Shahidullah
- Succeeded by: Md. Mashiur Rahman

Asiatic Society of Bangladesh
- In office 2024–2025
- Preceded by: Khondoker Bazlul Hoque
- Succeeded by: Sajahan Miah

Personal details
- Born: 7 February 1952 (age 74) Kawkhali, Pirojpur, Bangladesh
- Education: University of Dhaka (MA); University of London (PhD)
- Occupation: Professor, university administrator
- Awards: UGC Gold Medal (2016); Bangla Academy Literary Award (2021)

Harun-or-Rashid (born 7 February 1952) is a Bangladeshi political scientist, academic, and university administrator. He is a retired professor of the Department of Political Science at the University of Dhaka and a former Pro-Vice Chancellor of the university. He served as Vice-Chancellor of the National University, Bangladesh from 2013 to 2021. He also taught and conducted research as the Bangladesh Chair at Heidelberg University in Germany. He served as President of the Asiatic Society of Bangladesh for the 2024–2025 term.

== Early life and education ==
Rashid was born on 7 February 1952 in Joykul village in Kawkhali Upazila, Pirojpur District, Bangladesh. He earned his BA (Honours) and MA degrees in Political Science from the University of Dhaka, standing first in both examinations. In 1983, he earned a PhD from the University of London under a Commonwealth Scholarship. He subsequently conducted postdoctoral research at the University of London in 1992–1993 under a Commonwealth Academic Staff Fellowship. In addition, he completed postdoctoral research in Conflict Resolution at Uppsala University in 1994 under a Swedish government scholarship and in the Chittagong Hill Tracts at Ryukoku University in Japan in 2014 under a Numata Fellowship.

== Career ==
Harun-or-Rashid began his academic career as a lecturer in the Department of Political Science at the University of Chittagong in 1979. He was promoted to assistant professor in 1984. During this period, he also served as a member of the executive committee of the Chittagong University Teachers' Association. In 1985, he joined the Department of Political Science at the University of Dhaka as an assistant professor. He was promoted to associate professor in 1990 and professor in 1995. He later retired as a selection-grade professor.

He contributed to the development of the national curriculum and textbooks and to the formulation of the national education policy. He served as a member of the National Curriculum and Textbook Committee in 1996 and as a member of the National Education Policy Formulation Committee 1997, also known as the Shamsul Haque Education Commission, 1997.

Alongside teaching and research, Rashid held a number of administrative positions during his academic career. He served as a member of the University of Dhaka Senate from 1994 to 2008 and of the Syndicate from 2009 to 2012. He was Provost of Sir A. F. Rahman Hall from 1997 to 2001, Dean of the Faculty of Social Sciences for three terms from 2003 to 2009, and Pro-Vice Chancellor from 2009 to 2012. He also served as a member of the executive committee of the Dhaka University Teachers' Association from 2007 to 2009. From 2013 to 2021, he served two terms as Vice-Chancellor of the National University. During his tenure, the National University became free of session backlogs.

Harun-or-Rashid served as a Bangabandhu Sheikh Mujibur Rahman Professorial Fellow at the Bangladesh Chair at the South Asia Institute of Heidelberg University in Germany from 2021 to 2022, where he conducted research and taught. He also served as the first Bangabandhu Chair at the National University, Bangladesh.

Rashid has long been involved in the research and administrative activities of the Asiatic Society of Bangladesh. He served multiple terms as a council member and held the positions of Joint Secretary (1992–1993), General Secretary (1994–1995), and Vice-President (2006–2007, 2010–2013). He was subsequently elected President of the Asiatic Society of Bangladesh for the 2024–2025 term.

== Research and publications ==
Harun-or-Rashid served on the editorial boards of the first and second editions of Banglapedia, the national encyclopedia of Bangladesh published by the Asiatic Society of Bangladesh. He served as the chief editor of Encyclopedia of Bangladesh War of Liberation (10 volumes, in Bengali), also published by the Asiatic Society of Bangladesh. He has published 20 research monographs and several edited volumes in Bengali and English. A significant number of his research articles have also been published in journals in Bangladesh and abroad. He has served as editor of the Journal of the Asiatic Society of Bangladesh (Humanities) and Social Science Review, a research journal published by the Faculty of Social Sciences of the University of Dhaka. His notable authored and edited books include:

=== Books in Bengali ===
1. Statehood Ideal of the Bengalis and the Emergence of Bangladesh (Agami Prokashoni, 2003)
2. “Our Charter of Survival”: 50 Years of 6 Point (Bangla Academy, 2016)
3. Mainstream Politics: Bangladesh Awami League, Council 1949-2016 (Bangla Academy, 2016)
4. Unpublished Memoirs of Bangabandhu Revisited (UPL, 2013)
5. Bengal Muslim League: The Pakistan Movement, Bengali Political Thought and Bangabandhu (Anyaprokash, 2018)
6. Bangladesh: Governance, Politics and Constitutional Development, 1757-2018 (Anyaprokash 2018)
7. Why the 7 March Speech is a World Heritage Asset: Bangabandhu Muktijuddhya Bangladesh (Bangla Academy and Anyaprokash 2018)
8. From the 7 March Speech to Independence (Anyaprokash 2020)
9. Bangabandhu's Birth Centenary: Selected Essays (Anyaprokash, 2020)
10. Bangabandhu's Second Revolution: What and Why (Bangla Academy, 2020)
11. Bangabandhu Encyclopedia: An Illustrated Biography of the Father of the Nation, Bangabandhu Sheikh Mujibur Rahman (Journeyman Books, 2020)
12. Suhrawardy vs. Bangabandhu (Pathak Samabesh, 2021)
13. Bangabandhu's Role in the Language Movement (Anyaprokash, 2021)

=== Books in English ===
1. The Foreshadowing of Bangladesh: Bengal Muslim League and Muslim Politics, 1906–1947 (UPL, 2003)
2. Inside Bengal Politics 1936–1947: Unpublished Correspondence of Partition Leaders (UPL, 2003, 2012)
3. From 1947 Partition to Bangladesh: Bangabandhu and State Formation in Perspective (UPL, 2021)
4. Understanding Fifty Years of Bangladesh Politics: Struggles, Achievements and Challenges (Routledge, 2024)

=== Edited books (in Bengali) ===
1. Four National Leaders (Dhaka, 1996)
2. Voice of the Bangalis (Bangabandhu Parishad, 1998)
3. Bangabandhu: Politics and Administration (Bangabandhu Parishad, 1999)
4. Encyclopedia of Bangladesh War of Liberation (10 Volumes) (Asiatic Society of Bangladesh, 2020)
5. Bangabandhu: Social and Political Thought (National University, 2021)

== Awards ==
For his original research publications, Rashid received the UGC Gold Medal in 2016 and the Bangla Academy Literary Award in 2021 for his contribution to research on Bangabandhu Sheikh Mujibur Rahman.

== Trust fund ==
In 2024, the Dr. Harun-or-Rashid Trust Fund was established at the Asiatic Society of Bangladesh to award a gold medal for original research on the Growth of Bengali National Identity and State Formation, Bangabandhu Muktijuddhya Bangladesh, Bangladesh’s Political Dynamics and Development since Independence, Role of Judiciary, State of Civil Society, Problems of Electoral Integrity and Institution-building, and other related subjects, and to organize research lectures on these subjects.
