= 2026 Bangladeshi general election =

- 12 February 2026 (Note: The election for Sherpur-3 was postponed to 9 April 2026. A by-election for Bogra-6, caused by Tarique Rahman's decision to vacate the seat, was held on the same day.)

300 of the 350 seats in the Jatiya Sangsad 151 seats needed for a majority
- Opinion polls
- Registered: 127,711,793 (▲6.7 pp)
- Turnout: 59.44% (▲17.6 pp)
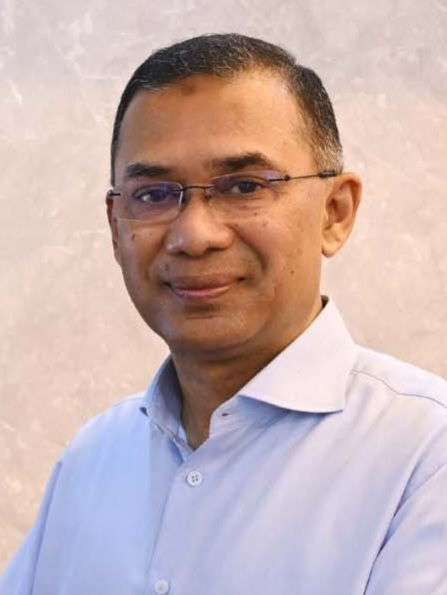

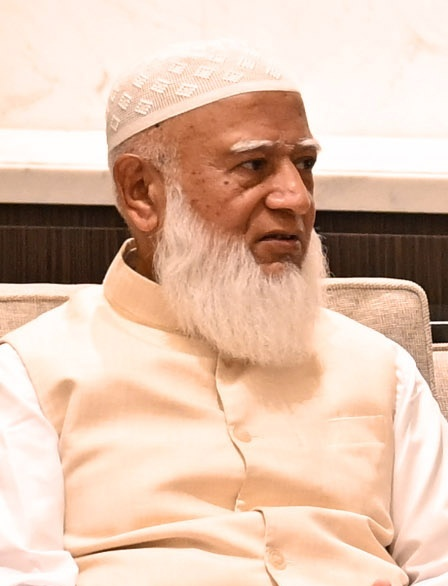

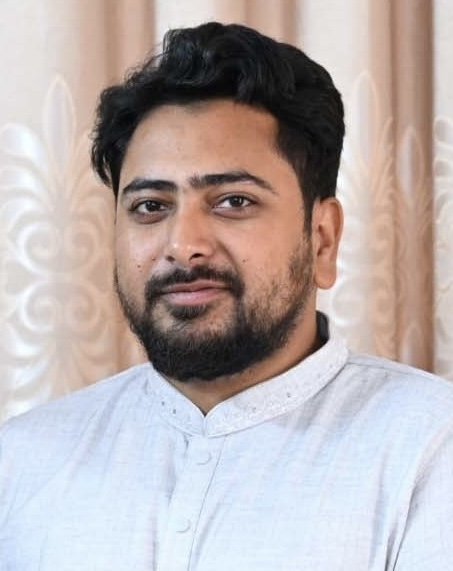
	First party	Second party	Third party
Leader	Tarique Rahman	Shafiqur Rahman	Nahid Islam
Party	BNP	Jamaat	NCP
Alliance		11 Parties	11 Parties
Leader since	9 January 2026	12 November 2019	28 February 2025
Leader's seat	Dhaka-17 (Note: Rahman also won in Bogra-6, which he subsequently vacated.)	Dhaka-15	Dhaka-11
Last election	Boycotted	Deregistered	New
Seats won	209	68	6
Seat change	▲209	▲68	▲6
Popular vote	37,468,994	23,825,259	2,286,795
Percentage	49.97%	31.77%	3.05%
Swing	▲38.24pp	▲27.06pp	▲3.05pp
Alliance Seat	212	77	77
Chief Adviser before election
Muhammad Yunus
Independent (interim)
Prime Minister after election
Tarique Rahman
BNP

General elections were held in Bangladesh on 12 February 2026 to elect members of the Jatiya Sangsad. It was the first general election since the July Uprising of 2024 that ended the 15-year-long rule of Sheikh Hasina. The Bangladesh Nationalist Party (BNP), led by Tarique Rahman, won a landslide victory in the election, securing two-thirds of seats; Bangladesh Jamaat-e-Islami secured the second most seats and a constitutional referendum on the July Charter was held alongside the election.

More than 127 million people were eligible to vote in the election, making it the "biggest democratic exercise of the year". 2,028 candidates contested for the 299 seats in the election. Major parties contested; however, Hasina's Awami League—the winner of the previous four elections—was banned and could not participate in the election. This made the election a "bipolar contest" between the BNP and the 11 Party Alliance led by the Bangladesh Jamaat-e-Islami and the National Citizen Party. The election took place under the interim government led by Muhammad Yunus, which had governed the country since August 2024.

Key campaign issues and agendas included unemployment, corruption, extortion, proportional representation (PR), and promises to the youth and the minority voters. A professor at SOAS University believed that the election was decided "less by ideology and more by promises of governance". For the first time in the country, postal ballots were used for the votes of expatriates, polling officials, and detainees. The election was also considered to be the world's first "Gen Z-inspired" election after the series of Gen Z protests around the world.

== Background ==
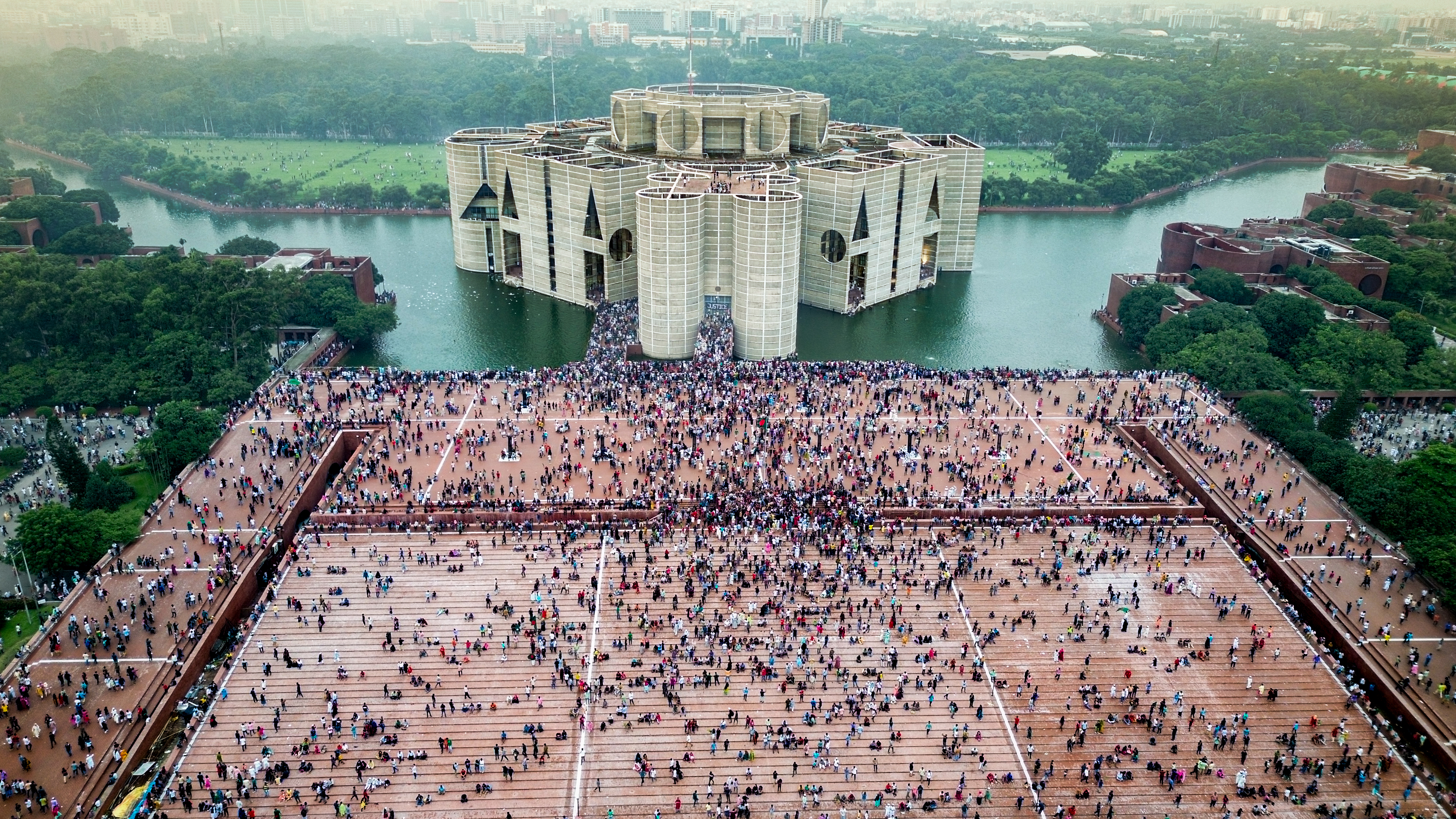
Jatiya Sangsad Bhaban being stormed by the protesters following the July Uprising

The Awami League won the 2024 general election, held amid a boycott by major opposition parties, following a record low voter turnout and a controversial election. In spite of this, they formed a government. The United States Department of State stated that the election was not free and fair and the United Kingdom's Foreign, Commonwealth and Development Office termed the election as "lacking the preconditions of democracy". According to The Economist, through that election, "Bangladesh effectively became a one-party state".

The main opposition party, the Bangladesh Nationalist Party (BNP), demanded that the government hand over power to a neutral caretaker government before the January 2024 elections. This was rejected by Hasina, who vowed, "Bangladesh will never allow an unelected government again". Hasina's resistance to a caretaker government arose following the 2006–2008 political crisis, during which a caretaker government assumed military-backed control of the country and arrested a number of political leaders, including her and former Prime Minister Khaleda Zia. Zia was sentenced to prison for five years, later extended to ten years, on 8 February 2018 for her involvement in the Zia Orphanage corruption case. Her son Tarique Rahman, the following BNP chairperson, was also found guilty of criminal conspiracy and multiple counts of murder for a 2004 Dhaka grenade attack that injured Hasina and killed 24 people. He was automatically barred from running for office due to the resulting life imprisonment.

In June 2024, the 2024 Bangladesh quota reform movement erupted throughout the country, demanding the reform of quotas in government jobs. The protests were met with a brutal crackdown by law-enforcement agencies and paramilitary forces, resulting in the July massacre. By August, the protests intensified into a large-scale Non-cooperation movement (2024) against the government which eventually culminated in the Resignation of Sheikh Hasina and her flight from persecution on 5 August. The following day, the 12th Jatiya Sangsad was dissolved by President Mohammed Shahabuddin. Khaleda Zia was released by the President of Bangladesh following Hasina's resignation.

Following negotiations between Students Against Discrimination leaders and the Bangladesh Armed Forces, Nobel laureate Muhammad Yunus was appointed as the Chief Adviser of Bangladesh to lead an interim government with a view of leading the country to new elections. The student leaders of the protest movement have also formed political groups such as the National Citizen Party and are assumed to participate in the election. Over time, serious disagreements have arisen over participation of the Awami League in the polls. BNP leader Ruhul Kabir Rizvi and Jatiya Party (Ershad) leader GM Quader supported Awami League participation in the polls. Bangladesh Army chief Waker-Uz-Zaman had reportedly stated that the participation of a "refined" Awami League led by leaders with "clean" image like Shirin Sharmin Chaudhury, Sheikh Fazle Noor Taposh and Saber Hossain Chowdhury is necessary to ensure that the elections are "free, fair and inclusive". Students Against Discrimination placed within the interim government like Mahfuj Alam bitterly opposed the participation of the Awami League in the polls. NCP leader Nahid Islam also voiced his opposition to participation of the Awami League in the polls, unless its leaders are put on trial for the July massacre. He stated that any attempt to relaunch the so-called refined Awami League in the elections amounts to foreign interference. Bangladesh Jamaat-e-Islami Ameer Shafiqur Rahman has also expressed his opposition to allowing the Awami League to participate in the polls.

A petition demanding a ban on the Awami League and its associates of the Grand Alliance filed by the student agitators had been rejected by the Appellate Division. On 9 April 2025, the NCP, Jamaat-e-Islami and other Islamist organisations such as the Hefazat-e-Islam Bangladesh staged a 2025 Awami League ban protests in front of the Jamuna State Guest House, the residence of the Chief Adviser, demanding a ban on the Awami League. On the following day, the interim government banned the Awami League and all of its activities in cyberspace and elsewhere, under the Anti-Terrorism Act, 2009. The ban would last until the International Crimes Tribunal completes the trial of the party and its leaders. On 17 November 2025, the International Crimes Tribunal ruled that Sheikh Hasina and her co-defendants were guilty of war crimes and sentenced her along with former home minister Asaduzzaman Khan Kamal to death. Khaleda Zia, former Bangladesh Prime Minister who was acquitted of all charges after the 2024 Bangladesh quota reform movement died on 30 December 2025 after a prolonged illness sparking a change in Bangladesh political landscape.

== Electoral system ==
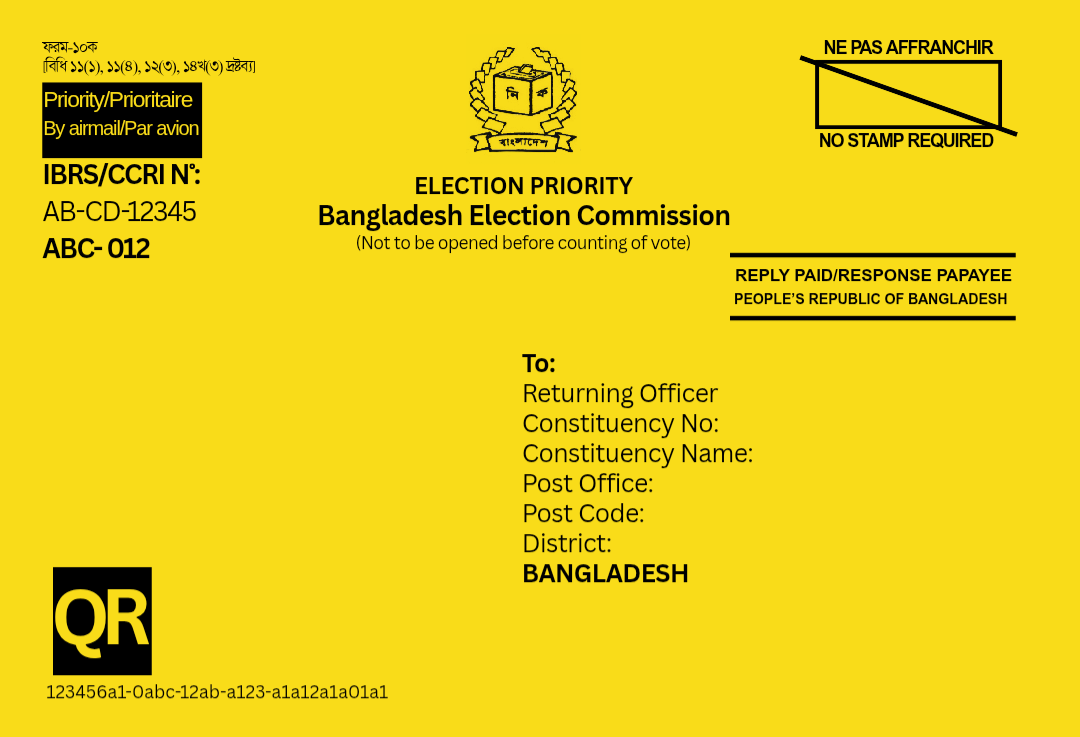
2026 general election and referendum postal ballot-sending envelope.

The 350 members of the Jatiya Sangsad consist of 300 directly elected seats using first-past-the-post voting (FPTP) in single-member constituencies, and an additional 50 seats reserved for women. The reserved seats are elected proportionally by the elected members. Each parliament sits for a five-year term. The interim government led by the Yunus ministry introduced reforms before the election, including reintroduction of "no vote" for the single candidate constituencies. It was the first general election in Bangladesh where expatriates voted through postal ballot. Accompanied by the referendum, postal voting, technical support and observer accreditation, this became the "most procedurally complex" election in the country's history.

=== Voters ===
According to the final voter list published by the Election Commission of Bangladesh, 127,711,793 people are eligible to vote in the election, 64,825,361 among whom are male, 62,885,200 are female, and 1,232 are third gender voters. The growth rate of the male voters was 2.29%, and the female voters was 4.16%. With 804,333 voters, Gazipur-2 is the largest constituency by the number of voters, while Jhalokati-1 is at the lowest number with 227,431 voters.

== Electoral preparation ==
Schedule
Poll Event	Schedule
Official declaration from the chief adviser	5 August 2025
Declaration of the schedule	11 December 2025
Application deadline for candidates	29 December 2025
Scrutiny of nomination	30 December 2025 – 4 January 2026
Last date for withdrawal of nomination	20 January 2026
Symbol allocation	21 January 2026
Postal voting	22 January – 12 February 2025
Start of campaign period	22 January 2026
End of campaign period	10 February 2026
Date of poll	12 February 2026
Date of counting of votes	12 February 2026
Date of reserved women seats Poll	12 May 2026

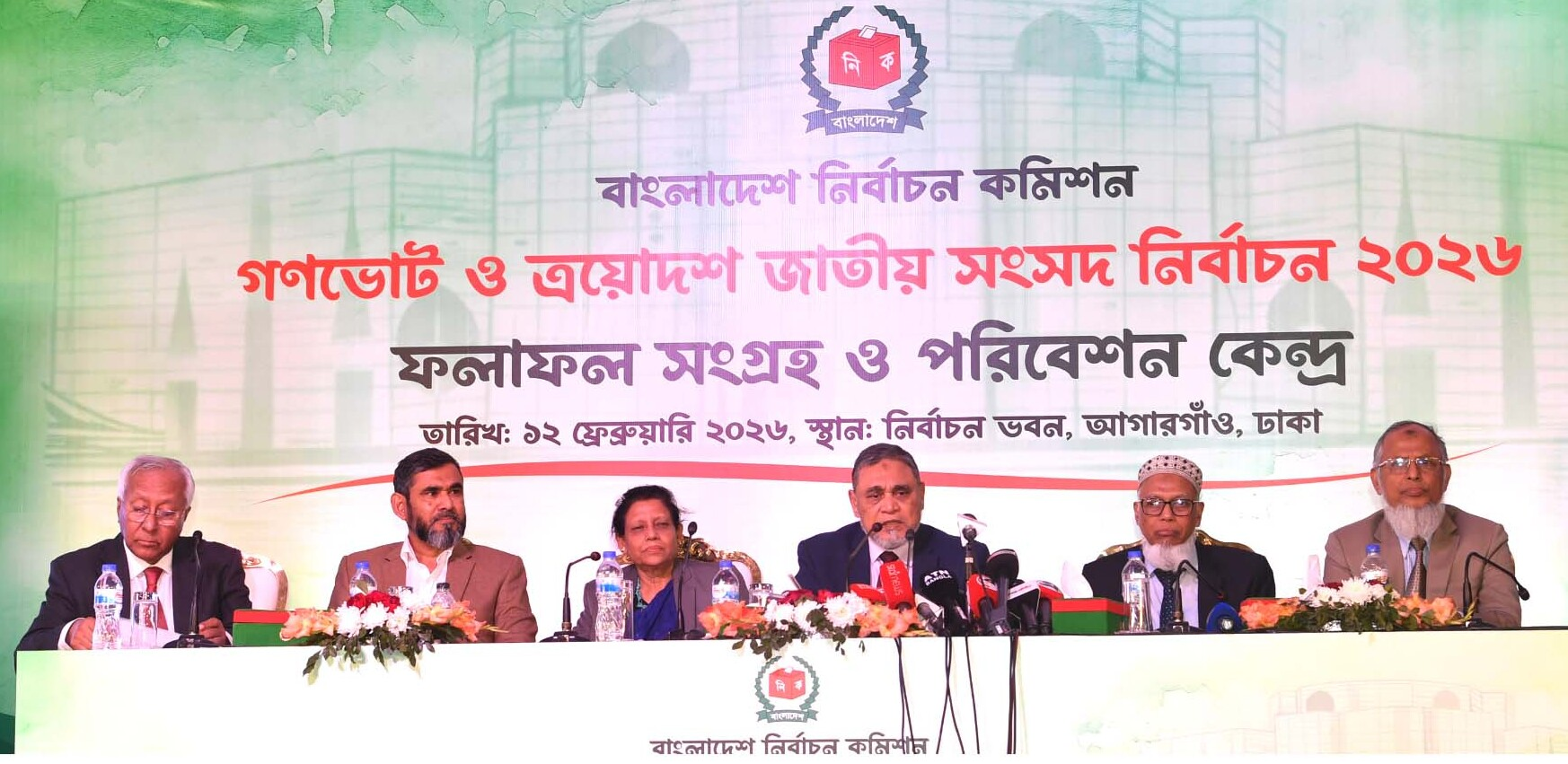
Chief Election Commissioner AMM Nasir Uddin briefing the results of the Referendum and National Parliament Election 2026.

In a televised address to the nation on 6 June 2025, Yunus declared the general election would be held on any day of the first half of April 2026. The BNP and Jatiya Party (Ershad) opposed holding elections in mid-2026, and demanded that the date be moved forward to December 2025, citing Kalbaisakhi storms and Ramadan. Later on 5 August, Yunus said in a televised broadcast that he would write to the Election Commission to request the election be held in February 2026 before Ramadan, which will begin as early as 17 February.

Chief election commissioner AMM Nasir Uddin's speech on the electoral schedule was recorded by the Bangladesh Television (BTV) and the Bangladesh Betar on 10 December 2025, and was broadcast on 11 December. On 22 December, Chief Adviser Muhammad Yunus inaugurated ten campaigning trucks named "Super Caravan", whose work will be to agitate public consciousness on election and information about the referendum.

A total of 3,407 nomination papers were collected for the 300 constituencies, and 2,582 papers were submitted. 28% of the submitted nominations were declined by the returning officers. 645 appeals were made against the nomination invalidation to the Election Commission. The election witnessed a significant increase of the number of female candidates, particularly from the Bangladesh Nationalist Party (BNP) and National Citizen Party (NCP). The only third gender (hijra) candidate was Anwarul Islam Rani, who stood as an independent candidate from Rangpur-3. With 15 candidates, Dhaka-12 is the constituency with the most candidates, while Pirojpur-1 is the lowest with only two candidates.

Region(s)	Constituencies	Nomination papers collection	Nomination papers submission	Primary nomination					Final nomination
Region(s)	Constituencies	Nomination papers collection	Nomination papers submission	Valid	Invalid	Valid after appeal	Valid nomination invalid after appeal	Nomination withdrawn	Final nomination
Dhaka Division	70	638	444	309	133	87	0	49	360
Cumilla	18	496	365	259	97	53	3	42	271
Mymensingh Division	24	402	311	199	112	72	0	43	240
Khulna Division	36	358	276	196	79	39	0	35	204
Rangpur Division	33	338	278	219	59	45	1	29	237
Rajshahi Division	39	329	260	185	74	45	0	23	216
Chattogram Division	58	293	194	138	56	32	1	19	155
Barishal Division	21	212	166	131	32	14	0	21	131
Sylhet Division	19	176	146	110	36	23	0	28	105
Faridpur	15	165	144	96	47	33	0	16	117
Total	300	3,407	2,582	1,842	725	443	5	305	2,036

On 4 February, the EC suspended election in the Sherpur-3 constituency over the death of Jamaat-e-Islami candidate Nuruzzaman Badal under the Representation of the People Order, 1972. Before the election, the government issued a three-day general holiday for the workers starting from 10 February, and a two-day general holiday for the service holders and government employees starting from 11 February, accompanied by the weekends of Friday-Saturday on 13 and 14 February respectively. Furthermore, the EC restricted the moving of some specific vehicles between 11 and 13 February midnights. This led to a nationwide mass migration of millions of homebound voters in a short timespan, creating heavy traffic and congestion in the highways, railways and the waterways, as well as a shortage of public transportation. According to The Daily Star, around 48 lakh mobile phone users left Dhaka between 9 and 11 February.

== Parties and alliances ==
Fifty registered political parties competed in the election. Nine registered parties fielded no candidates, including the Bangladesher Samyabadi Dal (Marxist–Leninist), Krishak Sramik Janata League, (Note: Officially endorsed BNP) National Awami Party (Muzaffar), Workers Party of Bangladesh, Bikalpa Dhara Bangladesh, Jatiya Samajtantrik Dal, Bangladesh Tarikat Federation, Trinamool BNP, and Bangladesh Nationalist Movement.

Alliance/Party		Symbol	Flag	Leader	Seats Contested		
Alliance/Party		Symbol	Flag	Leader	General	Alliance	Total
BNP+	Bangladesh Nationalist Party			Tarique Rahman	291 (Note: Bobby Hajjaj of the NDM and AZM Fariduzzaman Farhad of the NPP are only allied candidates from the respective parties, and both of them are contesting with the BNP's ticket.)		300
BNP+	Gono Odhikar Parishad			Nurul Haq Nur	94	2	300
BNP+	National People's Party			AZM Fariduzzaman Farhad	22	—N/a	300
BNP+	Ganosanhati Andolan			Zonayed Saki	17	1	300
BNP+	Nationalist Democratic Movement			Rashna Imam	8	—N/a	300
BNP+	Revolutionary Workers Party of Bangladesh			Khandaker Ali Abbas	7	1	300
BNP+	Jamiat Ulema-e-Islam Bangladesh			Ubaydullah Faruk	4		300
BNP+	Bangladesh Jatiya Party			Andaleeve Rahman	2	1	300
11 Parties	Bangladesh Jamaat-e-Islami			Shafiqur Rahman	228		296
11 Parties	Bangladesh Khelafat Majlis			Mamunul Haque	33	?	296
11 Parties	National Citizen Party			Nahid Islam	32	?	296
11 Parties	Amar Bangladesh Party			Mojibur Rahman Monju	30	3	296
11 Parties	Khelafat Majlis			Abdul Basit Azad	20	?	296
11 Parties	Bangladesh Labour Party			Mostafizur Rahman Iran	17	—N/a	296
11 Parties	Bangladesh Khilafat Andolan			Habibullah Mianji	8	—N/a	296
11 Parties	Liberal Democratic Party			Oli Ahmad	13	?	296
11 Parties	Nizam-e-Islam Party			Sarwar Kamal Azizi	3	1	296
11 Parties	Bangladesh Development Party			Anwarul Islam Chan	2		296
11 Parties	Jatiya Ganotantrik Party			Tasmia Pradhan	1	—N/a	296
NDF	Jatiya Party (Ershad)			Ghulam Muhammad Quader (Note: GM Quader is the legally recognized leader of the party. The leadership is disputed among Quader, Rowshan Ershad, and Anisul Islam Mahmud.) (Note: Only the Anisul faction of the party is a member of the alliance.)	199		211
NDF	Bangladesh Sangskritik Muktijote			Abu Layes Munna	20		211
NDF	Bangladesh Muslim League			Muhammad Mohsen Rashid	17		211
NDF	Jatiya Party (Manju)			Anwar Hossain Manju	10		211
DUF	Communist Party of Bangladesh			Kazi Sajjad Zahir Chandan	63		153
DUF	Socialist Party of Bangladesh			Bazlur Rashid Firoz	36		153
DUF	Socialist Party of Bangladesh (Marxist)			Masud Rana	34		153
DUF	Bangladesh Jatiya Samajtantrik Dal			Sharif Nurul Ambia	15		153
Greater; Sunni; Alliance	Bangladesh Islami Front			M A Matin	25		63
Greater; Sunni; Alliance	Bangladesh Supreme Party			Saifuddin Ahmed Al Hasani Maizbhandari	18		63
Greater; Sunni; Alliance	Islamic Front Bangladesh			Sayed Mohammad Bahadur Shah Mujaddedi	20		63
Islami Andolan Bangladesh				Syed Rezaul Karim	257		
Insaniyat Biplob Bangladesh		Apple		Imam Hayat	42		
Jatiya Samajtantrik Dal (Rab)				A. S. M. Abdur Rab	28		
Gano Forum				Subrata Chowdhury	20		
Janatar Dol				Mohammed Shamim Kamal	20		
Bangladesh Congress				Kazi Rezaul Hossain	19		
Amjanatar Dol				Mia Moshiuzzaman	15		
Bangladesh Republican Party				Md. Abu Hanif Hridoy	14		
Nagorik Oikko				Mahmudur Rahman Manna	11		
Bangladesh Nationalist Front				S.M. Abul Kalam Azad	8		
Bangladesh Minority Janata Party		Rocket		Sukriti Kumar Mondal	8		
Bangladesh Jatiya Party				ANM Sirajul Islam	6		
Zaker Party				Mostofa Ameer Faisal Mujaddedi	5		
Gano Front				Amirul Nuzhat	5		
Bangladesh Muslim League				Sheikh Zulfikar Bulbul Chowdhury	3		
Bangladesh Kalyan Party				Syed Muhammad Ibrahim	2		
Islami Oikya Jote				Abdul Qadir	2		
Ganatantri Party				Arosh Ali	1		
Bangladesh National Awami Party (Bhasani)				Jebel Rahman Ghaani	1		
Bangladesh Equal Right Party				Sushant Chandra Burman	1		
Independents		N/A			274		
Total					2031		

== Candidates ==
A total of 2,029 candidates are contesting the election for 300 parliamentary seats.

Division	Constituency		Bangladesh Nationalist Party+		11 Party Alliance		National Democratic Front	
Rangpur Division	1	Panchagarh-1	BNP	Barrister Nawshad Zamir	NCP	Sarjis Alam	—N/a	
Rangpur Division	2	Panchagarh-2	BNP	Farhad Hossain Azad	Jamaat	Md. Shafiul Alam	JP(E)	Md. Lutfar Rahman Ripon
Rangpur Division	3	Thakurgaon-1	BNP	Prof. Mirza Fakhrul Islam Alamgir	Jamaat	Delwar Hossain	—N/a	
Rangpur Division	4	Thakurgaon-2	BNP	Abdus Salam	Jamaat	Abdul Hakim	JP(E)	Nurun Nahar Begum
Rangpur Division	5	Thakurgaon-3	BNP	Jahidur Rahman	Jamaat	Mizanur Rahman	JP(E)	Hafiz Uddin Ahmed
Rangpur Division	6	Dinajpur-1	BNP	Md. Monjurul Islam	Jamaat	Md. Matiur Rahman	JP(E)	Md. Shahinur Islam
Rangpur Division	7	Dinajpur-2	BNP	Md. Sadiq Riaz	Jamaat	A. K. M. Afzalul Anam	JP(E)	Md. Zulfikar Hossain
Rangpur Division	8	Dinajpur-3	BNP	Syed Jahangir Alam	Jamaat	Md. Mainul Alam	JP(E)	Ahmed Shafi Rubel
Rangpur Division	9	Dinajpur-4	BNP	Akhtaruzzaman Mia	Jamaat	Md. Aftab Uddin Molla	JP(E)	Md. Nurul Amin Shah
Rangpur Division	10	Dinajpur-5	BNP	A. K. M. Kamruzzaman	NCP	Md. Abdul Ahad	JP(E)	Md. Kazi Abdul Gafur
Rangpur Division	11	Dinajpur-6	BNP	A. Z. M. Zahid Hossain	Jamaat	Md. Anwarul Islam	JP(E)	Md. Rezaul Haque
Rangpur Division	12	Nilphamari-1	JUIB	Monjurul Islam Afendi	Jamaat	Md. Abdus Sattar	JP(E)	Md. Taslim Uddin
Rangpur Division	13	Nilphamari-2	BNP	Shahrin Islam Tuhin	Jamaat	Alfaruk Abdul Latif	—N/a	
Rangpur Division	14	Nilphamari-3	BNP	Syed Ali	Jamaat	Obaidullah Khan Salafi	JP(E)	Md. Rohan Chowdhury
Rangpur Division	15	Nilphamari-4	BNP	Md. Abdul Gafur Sarkar	Jamaat	Abdul Montakim	JP(E)	Md. Siddiqul Alam
Rangpur Division	16	Lalmonirhat-1	BNP	Hasan Rajib Prodhan	Jamaat	Anowarul Islam Raju	JP(E)	Mashiur Rahaman Ranga
Rangpur Division	17	Lalmonirhat-2	BNP	Rokon Uddin Babul	Jamaat	Firoz Haider Lavlu	JP(E)	Md Elhan Uddin
Rangpur Division	18	Lalmonirhat-3	BNP	Asadul Habib Dulu	Jamaat	Md. Abu Taher	JP(E)	Md. Zahid Hasan
Rangpur Division	19	Rangpur-1	BNP	Md. Mokarram Hossain Sujon	Jamaat	Raihan Siraji	—N/a	
Rangpur Division	20	Rangpur-2	BNP	Mohammad Ali Sarkar	Jamaat	A. T. M. Azharul Islam	JP(E)	Anisul Islam Mondol
Rangpur Division	21	Rangpur-3	BNP	Md. Shamsuzzaman Samu	Jamaat	Mahbubur Rahman Belal	JP(E)	GM Quader
Rangpur Division	22	Rangpur-4	BNP	Mohammad Emdadul Haque Bharsa	NCP	Akhter Hossain	JP(E)	Abu Naser Md. Shah Mahbubur Rahman
Rangpur Division	23	Rangpur-5	BNP	Md. Golam Rabbani	Jamaat	Md. Golam Rabbani	JP(E)	S. M. Fakhruzzaman Jahangir
Rangpur Division	24	Rangpur-6	BNP	Md. Saiful Islam	Jamaat	Md. Nurul Amin	JP(E)	Nur Alam Jadu
Rangpur Division	25	Kurigram-1	BNP	Saifur Rahman Rana	Jamaat	Anwarul Islam	JP(E)	A.K.M. Mostafizur Rahman
Rangpur Division	26	Kurigram-2	BNP	Md. Sohel Hossain Kaikobad	NCP	Atik Mujahid	JP(E)	Ponir Uddin Ahmed
Rangpur Division	27	Kurigram-3	BNP	Tazvirul Islam	Jamaat	Mahbub Alam Salehi	JP(E)	Abdus Sobhan
Rangpur Division	28	Kurigram-4	BNP	Md. Azizur Rahman	Jamaat	Md. Mostafizur Rahman	JP(E)	K. M. Fazlul Mandal
Rangpur Division	29	Gaibandha-1	BNP	Khandaker Ziaul Islam Mohammad Ali	Jamaat	Md. Majedur Rahman	JP(E)	Shamim Haider Patwary
Rangpur Division	30	Gaibandha-2	BNP	Md. Anisuzzaman Khan Babu	Jamaat	Md. Abdul Karim Sarkar	JP(E)	Abdur Rashid Sarkar
Rangpur Division	31	Gaibandha-3	BNP	Syed Mainul Hassan Sadiq	Jamaat	Nazrul Islam	JP(E)	Mainur Rabbi Chowdhury Ruman
Rangpur Division	32	Gaibandha-4	BNP	Shamim Kaisar Lincoln	Jamaat	Abdur Rahim Sarkar	JP(E)	Kazi Mashiur Rahman
Rangpur Division	33	Gaibandha-5	BNP	Md. Faruk Alam Sarker	Jamaat	Abdullah Warraich	JP(E)	Shamim Haider Patwary
Rajshahi Division	34	Joypurhat-1	BNP	Md. Masud Rana Prodhan	Jamaat	Fazlur Rahman Said	—N/a	
Rajshahi Division	35	Joypurhat-2	BNP	Abdul Bari	Jamaat	S. M. Rashedul Alam Sobuj	—N/a	
Rajshahi Division	36	Bogra-1	BNP	Kazi Rafiqul Islam	Jamaat	Md. Sahabuddin	—N/a	
Rajshahi Division	37	Bogra-2	BNP	Mir Shahe Alam	Jamaat	Md. Shahadatuzzaman	JP(E)	Shariful Islam Jinnah
Rajshahi Division	38	Bogra-3	BNP	Abdul Muhit Talukder	Jamaat	Nur Muhammad Abu Taher	JP(E)	Md. Shahinul Islam
Rajshahi Division	39	Bogra-4	BNP	Mosharraf Hossain	Jamaat	Mustafa Faisal Parvez	JP(E)	Shahin Mustafa Kamal
Rajshahi Division	40	Bogra-5	BNP	Golam Mohammad Siraj	Jamaat	Md. Dabibur Rahman	—N/a	
Rajshahi Division	41	Bogra-6	BNP	Tarique Rahman	Jamaat	Abidur Rahman Sohel	—N/a	
Rajshahi Division	42	Bogra-7	BNP	Morshed Alam	Jamaat	Golam Rabbani	BML	Md. Ansar Ali
Rajshahi Division	43	Chapai Nawabganj-1	BNP	Shahjahan Miah	Jamaat	Md. Keramat Ali	JP(E)	Afzal Hossain
Rajshahi Division	44	Chapai Nawabganj-2	BNP	Md. Aminul Islam	Jamaat	Mizanur Rahman	JP(E)	Md. Khurshid Alam
Rajshahi Division	45	Chapai Nawabganj-3	BNP	Md. Harunur Rashid	Jamaat	Nurul Islam Bulbul	—N/a	
Rajshahi Division	46	Naogaon-1	BNP	Md. Mostafizur Rahman	Jamaat	Mahtab ul Haq	JP(E)	Md. Akbar Ali
Rajshahi Division	47	Naogaon-2	BNP	Shamsuzzoha Khan	Jamaat	Md. Enamul Haque	—N/a	
Rajshahi Division	48	Naogaon-3	BNP	Md. Fazle Huda Babul	Jamaat	Muhammad Mahfuzur Rahman	JP(E)	Md. Masud Rana
Rajshahi Division	49	Naogaon-4	BNP	Ekramul Bari Tipu	Jamaat	Khondkar Muhammad Abdur Rakib	JP(E)	Md. Altaf Hossain
Rajshahi Division	50	Naogaon-5	BNP	Zahidul Islam Dulu	Jamaat	Abu Sadat Md. Sayem	JP(E)	Md. Anwar Hossain
Rajshahi Division	51	Naogaon-6	BNP	Sheikh Md. Rejaul Islam Reju	Jamaat	Muhammad Khobirul Islam	—N/a	
Rajshahi Division	52	Rajshahi-1	BNP	Md. Sharif Uddin	Jamaat	Mujibur Rahman	—N/a	
Rajshahi Division	53	Rajshahi-2	BNP	Mizanur Rahman Minu	Jamaat	Mohammad Jahangir	—N/a	
Rajshahi Division	54	Rajshahi-3	BNP	Shofiqul Haque Milon	Jamaat	Abdul Kalam Azad	JP(E)	Afzal Hossain
Rajshahi Division	55	Rajshahi-4	BNP	Ziaur Rahman Zia	Jamaat	Abdul Bari Sardar	—N/a	
Rajshahi Division	56	Rajshahi-5	BNP	Nazrul Islam Mondol	Jamaat	Manzur Rahman	—N/a	
Rajshahi Division	57	Rajshahi-6	BNP	Abu Sayed Chand	Jamaat	Md. Nazmul Haq	JP(E)	Md. Iqbal Hossain
Rajshahi Division	58	Natore-1	BNP	Farzana Sharmin	Jamaat	Abdul Kalam Azad	—N/a	
Rajshahi Division	59	Natore-2	BNP	Ruhul Quddus Talukdar	Jamaat	Md. Yunus Ali	JP(E)	Md. Rakib Uddin Kamal
Rajshahi Division	60	Natore-3	BNP	Md. Anwarul Islam	NCP	S. M. Jarjis Kabir	JP(E)	Md. Ashiq Iqbal
Rajshahi Division	61	Natore-4	BNP	Md. Abdul Aziz	Jamaat	Md. Abdul Hakim	JP(E)	M. Yusuf Ahmed
Rajshahi Division	62	Sirajganj-1	BNP	Salim Reza	Jamaat	Md. Shahinur Alam	JP(E)	Md. Zahurul Islam
Rajshahi Division	63	Sirajganj-2	BNP	Iqbal Hassan Mahmood	Jamaat	Muhammad Zahidul Islam	—N/a	
Rajshahi Division	64	Sirajganj-3	BNP	Ainul Haque	BKM	Md. Abdur Rauf Sarkar	JP(E)	Md. Fazlul Haque
Rajshahi Division	65	Sirajganj-4	BNP	M Akbar Ali	Jamaat	Rafiqul Islam Khan	JP(E)	Md. Hilton Pramanik
Rajshahi Division	66	Sirajganj-5	BNP	Md. Amirul Islam Khan	Jamaat	Md. Ali Alam	JP(E)	Md. Akbar Hossain
Rajshahi Division	67	Sirajganj-6	BNP	M. A. Muhit	NCP	S. M. Saif Mostafiz	JP(E)	Md. Moktar Hossain
Rajshahi Division	68	Pabna-1	BNP	Md. Shamsur Rahman	Jamaat	Nazibur Rahman Momen	—N/a	
Rajshahi Division	69	Pabna-2	BNP	AKM Salim Reza Habib	Jamaat	Md. Hesab Uddin	JP(E)	Mehedi Hasan Rubel
Rajshahi Division	70	Pabna-3	BNP	Hasan Zafar Tuhin	Jamaat	Mohammad Ali Asghar	JP(E)	Mir Nadim Mohammad Dablu
Rajshahi Division	71	Pabna-4	BNP	Habibur Rahman Habib	Jamaat	Md. Abu Taleb Mondol	JP(E)	Md. Saiful Azad Mallick
Rajshahi Division	72	Pabna-5	BNP	Md. Shamsur Rahman Shimul Biswas	Jamaat	Md. Iqbal Hossain	—N/a	
Khulna Division	73	Meherpur-1	BNP	Masud Arun	Jamaat	Tajuddin Khan	JP(E)	Md. Abdul Hamid
Khulna Division	74	Meherpur-2	BNP	Md. Amzad Hossain	Jamaat	Md. Nazmul Huda	JP(E)	Md. Abdul Baki
Khulna Division	75	Kushtia-1	BNP	Reza Ahmed Bachchu	Jamaat	Belal Uddin	JP(E)	Md. Shahariar Jamil
Khulna Division	76	Kushtia-2	BNP	Raghib Rauf Chowdhury	Jamaat	Md. Abdul Gafur	—N/a	
Khulna Division	77	Kushtia-3	BNP	Md. Zakir Hossain Sarker	Jamaat	Amir Hamza	—N/a	
Khulna Division	78	Kushtia-4	BNP	Syed Mehedi Ahmed Rumi	Jamaat	Afzal Hossain	—N/a	
Khulna Division	79	Chuadanga-1	BNP	Md. Sharifuzzaman	Jamaat	Masud Parvez Russell	—N/a	
Khulna Division	80	Chuadanga-2	BNP	Mahmud Hasan Khan	Jamaat	Md. Ruhul Amin	—N/a	
Khulna Division	81	Jhenaidah-1	BNP	Md. Asaduzzaman	Jamaat	Abu Saleh Md. Matiur Rahman	JP(E)	Monika Alam
Khulna Division	82	Jhenaidah-2	BNP	Md. Abdul Majid	Jamaat	Ali Azam Md. Abu Bakr	JP(E)	Sawgatul Islam
Khulna Division	83	Jhenaidah-3	BNP	Mohammad Mehedi Hasan	Jamaat	Matiur Rahman	—N/a	
Khulna Division	84	Jhenaidah-4	BNP	Md. Rashed Khan	Jamaat	Md. Abu Taleb	JP(E)	Emdadul Islam
Khulna Division	85	Jessore-1	BNP	Nuruzzaman Liton	Jamaat	Muhammad Azizur Rahman	JP(E)	Md. Jahangir Alam
Khulna Division	86	Jessore-2	BNP	Sabira Sultana	Jamaat	Moslehuddin Farid	JP(E)	Md. Feroz Shah
Khulna Division	87	Jessore-3	BNP	Aninda Islam Amit	Jamaat	Md. Abdul Kader	JP(E)	Md. Kabir Gazi
Khulna Division	88	Jessore-4	BNP	Matiar Rahman Faraji	Jamaat	Golam Rasul	JP(E)	Md. Zahurul Haque
Khulna Division	89	Jessore-5	BNP	Rashid Bin Waqqas	Jamaat	Gazi Enamul Haq	JP(E)	M. A. Halim
Khulna Division	90	Jessore-6	BNP	Abul Hossain Azad	Jamaat	Md. Moktar Ali	JP(E)	G. M. Hassan
Khulna Division	91	Magura-1	BNP	Monowar Hossain Khan	Jamaat	Abdul Matin	JP(E)	Md. Zakir Hossain Mollah
Khulna Division	92	Magura-2	BNP	Nitai Roy Chowdhury	Jamaat	Md. Mushtarshed Billah	JP(E)	Moshiar Rahman
Khulna Division	93	Narail-1	BNP	Biswas Jahangir Alam	Jamaat	Obaydullah Kaiser	JP(E)	Md. Milton Mollah
Khulna Division	94	Narail-2	BNP	A. Z. M. Fariduzzaman Farhad	Jamaat	Ataur Rahman Bacchu	JP(E)	Khandaker Fayekuzzaman
Khulna Division	95	Bagerhat-1	BNP	Kapil Krishna Mondal	Jamaat	Mashur Rahman Khan	JP(E)	S. M. Golam Sarwar
Khulna Division	96	Bagerhat-2	BNP	Sheikh Mohammad Zakir Hossain	Jamaat	Sheikh Manjurul Haq Rahad	—N/a	
Khulna Division	97	Bagerhat-3	BNP	Sheikh Faridul Islam	Jamaat	Muhammad Abdul Wadud Shiekh	—N/a	
Khulna Division	98	Bagerhat-4	BNP	Somnath Dey	Jamaat	Abdul Alim	JP(E)	Sajan Kumar Mistry
Khulna Division	99	Khulna-1	BNP	Amir Ezaz Khan	Jamaat	Krishna Nandi	JP(E)	Md. Jahangir Hossain
Khulna Division	100	Khulna-2	BNP	Nazrul Islam Manju	Jamaat	Sheikh Jahangir Hussain Helal	—N/a	
Khulna Division	101	Khulna-3	BNP	Rakibul Islam Bokul	Jamaat	Mahfuzur Rahman	JP(E)	Md. Abdullah Al Mamun
Khulna Division	102	Khulna-4	BNP	Azizul Baree Helal	KM	S. M. Sakhawat Hossain	—N/a	
Khulna Division	103	Khulna-5	BNP	Mohammad Ali Asghar	Jamaat	Mia Golam Parwar	JP(E)	Shamim Ara Parveen
Khulna Division	104	Khulna-6	BNP	Monirul Hasan Bappi	Jamaat	Md. Abul Kalam Azad	JP(E)	Md. Mustafa Kamal Jahangir
Khulna Division	105	Satkhira-1	BNP	Habibul Islam Habib	Jamaat	Md. Izzat Ullah	JP(E)	Ziaur Rahman
Khulna Division	106	Satkhira-2	BNP	Abdur Rouf	Jamaat	Muhaddis Abdul Khaliq	JP(E)	Ashrafuzzaman Ashu
Khulna Division	107	Satkhira-3	BNP	Kazi Alauddin	Jamaat	Muhaddis Rabiul Bashar	JP(E)	Md. Alif Hossain
Khulna Division	108	Satkhira-4	BNP	Md. Moniruzzaman	Jamaat	Gazi Nazrul Islam	JP(E)	Hussein Muhammad Mayaz
Barishal Division	109	Barguna-1	BNP	Md. Nazrul Islam Molla	KM	Md. Jahangir Hossain	JP(E)	Md. Jamal Hossain
Barishal Division	110	Barguna-2	BNP	Nurul Islam Moni	Jamaat	Sultan Ahmed	JP(E)	Abdul Latif Farazi
Barishal Division	111	Patuakhali-1	BNP	Altaf Hossain Chowdhury	AB Party	Mohammad Abdul Wahab	JP(E)	Mannan Howlader
Barishal Division	112	Patuakhali-2	BNP	Shahidul Alam Talukder	Jamaat	Md. Shafiqul Islam Masud	—N/a	
Barishal Division	113	Patuakhali-3	GOP	Nurul Haque Nur	Jamaat	Shah Alam	—N/a	
Barishal Division	114	Patuakhali-4	BNP	A. B. M. Mosharraf Hossain	KM	Zahir Uddin Ahmed	—N/a	
Barishal Division	115	Bhola-1	BJP	Andaleeve Rahman	Jamaat	Md. Nazrul Islam	JP(E)	Md. Akbar Hossain
Barishal Division	116	Bhola-2	BNP	Md. Hafiz Ibrahim	LDP	Mokfar Uddin Chowdhury	JP(E)	Md. Jahangir Alam Ritu
Barishal Division	117	Bhola-3	BNP	Hafizuddin Ahmed	BDP	Nizamul Haque	JP(E)	Md. Kamal Uddin
Barishal Division	118	Bhola-4	BNP	Mohammad Nurul Islam Nayan	Jamaat	Mustafa Kamal	JP(E)	Md. Mizanur Rahman
Barishal Division	119	Barisal-1	BNP	Zahir Uddin Swapan	Jamaat	Kamrul Islam	JP(E)	Sernibat Sikander Ali
Barishal Division	120	Barisal-2	BNP	Shardar Sharfuddin Ahmed Shantu	Jamaat	Abdul Mannan	JP(E)	M. A. Jalil
Barishal Division	121	Barisal-3	BNP	Zainul Abedin	AB Party	Asaduzzaman Fuaad	JP(E)	Golam Kibria Tipu
Barishal Division	122	Barisal-4	BNP	Md. Rajib Ahsan	Jamaat	Abdul Jabbar	BSM	Abdul Jalil
Barishal Division	123	Barisal-5	BNP	Majibur Rahman Sarwar	11 Party Alliance supported IAB		JP(E)	Akhtar Rahman
Barishal Division	124	Barisal-6	BNP	Abul Hossain Khan	Jamaat	Mahmudunnabi Talukder	BML	Abdul Quddus
Barishal Division	125	Jhalokati-1	BNP	Rafiqul Islam Jamal	Jamaat	Fayzul Huq	JP(E)	Md. Rubel Howlader
Barishal Division	126	Jhalokati-2	BNP	Israt Sultana Elen Bhutto	Jamaat	Sheikh Neyamul Karim	—N/a	
Barishal Division	127	Pirojpur-1	BNP	Alamgir Hossain	Jamaat	Masood Sayedee	—N/a	
Barishal Division	128	Pirojpur-2	BNP	Ahammad Sohel Manzur	Jamaat	Shameem Sayedee	JP(M)	Md. Mahibul Hossain
Barishal Division	129	Pirojpur-3	BNP	Md. Ruhul Amin Dulal	NCP	Md. Shamim Hamidi	JP(E)	Md. Mashrequl Azam
Mymensingh Division	138	Jamalpur-1	BNP	M. Rashiduzzaman Millat	Jamaat	Nazmul Haque Sayedee	JP(E)	A. K. M. Fazlul Haque
Mymensingh Division	139	Jamalpur-2	BNP	Sultan Mahmud Babu	Jamaat	Shamiul Haque Farooqi	—N/a	
Mymensingh Division	140	Jamalpur-3	BNP	Md. Mustafizur Rahman Babul	Jamaat	Mujibur Rahman Azadi	JP(E)	Mir Shamsul Alam
Mymensingh Division	141	Jamalpur-4	BNP	Md. Faridul Kabir Talukder Shamim	Jamaat	Md. Abdul Awal	—N/a	
Mymensingh Division	142	Jamalpur-5	BNP	Shah Md. Wares Ali Mamun	Jamaat	Abdus Sattar	JP(E)	Md. Babar Ali Khan
Mymensingh Division	143	Sherpur-1	BNP	Sunsila Jabrin Priyanka	Jamaat	Hafez Rashedul Islam	JP(E)	Md. Ilias Uddin
Mymensingh Division	144	Sherpur-2	BNP	Mohammad Fahim Chowdhury	Jamaat	Md. Masudur Rahman	—N/a	
Mymensingh Division	145	Sherpur-3	BNP	Mahmudul Haque Rubel	Jamaat	Md. Golam Kibria	—N/a	
Mymensingh Division	146	Mymensingh-1	BNP	Syed Imran Saleh Prince	KM	Md. Tajul Islam	—N/a	
Mymensingh Division	147	Mymensingh-2	BNP	Motaher Hossain Talukder	BKM	Md. Muhammadullah	JP(E)	Md. Emdadul Haque Khan
Mymensingh Division	148	Mymensingh-3	BNP	M. Iqbal Hossain	NIP	Md. Abu Taher Khan	—N/a	
Mymensingh Division	149	Mymensingh-4	BNP	Abu Wahab Akand	Jamaat	Kamrul Ahsan	JP(E)	Abu Md. Musa Sarkar
Mymensingh Division	150	Mymensingh-5	BNP	Mohammad Jakir Hossain	Jamaat	Matiur Rahman Akand	—N/a	
Mymensingh Division	151	Mymensingh-6	BNP	Md. Akhtarul Alam	Jamaat	Md. Kamrul Hasan	—N/a	
Mymensingh Division	152	Mymensingh-7	BNP	Md. Mahbubur Rahman	Jamaat	Md. Asaduzzaman	JP(E)	Md. Zahirul Islam
Mymensingh Division	153	Mymensingh-8	BNP	Lutfullahel Majed Babu	LDP	Md. Aurangzeb Belal	JP(E)	Fakhrul Imam
Mymensingh Division	154	Mymensingh-9	BNP	Yaser Khan Chowdhury	BDP	Anwarul Islam Chand	JP(E)	Hasmat Mahmud
Mymensingh Division	155	Mymensingh-10	BNP	Mohammad Akteruzzaman Bacchu	LDP	Syed Mahmud Morshed	JP(E)	Md. Al Amin Sohan
Mymensingh Division	156	Mymensingh-11	BNP	Fakhruddin Ahmed Bacchu	NCP	Jahidul Islam	—N/a	
Mymensingh Division	157	Netrokona-1	BNP	Kayser Kamal	BKM	Ghulam Rabbani	JP(E)	Md. Anwar Hossain Khan
Mymensingh Division	158	Netrokona-2	BNP	Md. Anwarul Haque	NCP	Fahim Rahman Khan Pathan	JP(E)	A. B. M. Rafiqul Haque Talukder
Mymensingh Division	159	Netrokona-3	BNP	Rafiqul Islam Hilani	Jamaat	Md. Khairul Kabir Niyogi	JP(E)	Md. Abul Hossain Talukder
Mymensingh Division	160	Netrokona-4	BNP	Lutfozzaman Babar	Jamaat	Al Helal Talukder	—N/a	
Mymensingh Division	161	Netrokona-5	BNP	Md. Abu Taher Talukder	Jamaat	Masum Mustafa	—N/a	
Dhaka Division	130	Tangail-1	BNP	Fakir Mahbub Anam Swapan	Jamaat	Muhammad Abdullah Kafi	JP(E)	Muhammad Ilyas Hossain
Dhaka Division	131	Tangail-2	BNP	Abdus Salam Pintu	Jamaat	Humayun Kabir	JP(E)	Md. Humayun Kabir Talukder
Dhaka Division	132	Tangail-3	BNP	S. M. Obaidul Haque Nasir	NCP	Saifullah Haider	—N/a	
Dhaka Division	133	Tangail-4	BNP	Lutfor Rahman Khan Matin	Jamaat	Khandaker Abdur Razzak	JP(E)	Md. Liaquat Ali
Dhaka Division	134	Tangail-5	BNP	Sultan Salauddin Tuku	Jamaat	Ahsan Habib Masud	JP(E)	Md. Mozammel Haque
Dhaka Division	135	Tangail-6	BNP	Md. Rabiul Awwal Lavlu	Jamaat	Abdul Hamid	JP(E)	Mohammad Mamunur Rahim
Dhaka Division	136	Tangail-7	BNP	Abul Kalam Azad Siddiqui	Jamaat	Abdullah Talukder	—N/a	
Dhaka Division	137	Tangail-8	BNP	Ahmad Azam Khan	Jamaat	Shafiqul Islam Khan	JP(E)	Md. Nazmul Hasan
Dhaka Division	162	Kishoreganj-1	BNP	Mohammad Mazharul Islam	KM	Ahmad Ali	—N/a	
Dhaka Division	163	Kishoreganj-2	BNP	Md. Jalal Uddin	Jamaat	Md. Shafiqul Islam	JP(E)	Md. Afzal Hossain Bhuiyan
Dhaka Division	164	Kishoreganj-3	BNP	Osman Faruk	Jamaat	Jihad Khan	JP(E)	Md. Abu Bakr Siddique
Dhaka Division	165	Kishoreganj-4	BNP	Md. Fazlur Rahman	Jamaat	Md. Rokon Reza Sheikh	—N/a	
Dhaka Division	166	Kishoreganj-5	BNP	Syed Ehsanul Huda	Jamaat	Ramzan Ali	JP(E)	Md. Mahbubul Alam
Dhaka Division	167	Kishoreganj-6	BNP	Md. Shariful Alam	BKM	Ataullah Amin	JP(E)	Mohammad Ayub Hussain
Dhaka Division	168	Manikganj-1	BNP	S. A. Jinnah Kabir	Jamaat	Abu Bakr Siddique	—N/a	
Dhaka Division	169	Manikganj-2	BNP	Mainul Islam Khan	KM	Md. Salah Uddin	JP(E)	S. M. Abdul Mannan
Dhaka Division	170	Manikganj-3	BNP	Afroza Khan Rita	BKM	Mufti Saeed Nur	JP(E)	Abul Bashar Badshah
Dhaka Division	171	Munshiganj-1	BNP	Sheikh Md. Abdullah	Jamaat	A. K. M. Fakhruddin Raji	—N/a	
Dhaka Division	172	Munshiganj-2	BNP	Abdus Salam Azad	NCP	Majedul Islam	JP(E)	Md. Noman Mia
Dhaka Division	173	Munshiganj-3	BNP	Md. Kamruzzaman	BKM	Nur Hossain Noorani	JP(E)	Md. Arifuzzaman Didar
Dhaka Division	174	Dhaka-1	BNP	Khandaker Abu Ashfaq	Jamaat	Nazrul Islam	JP(E)	Md. Nasir Uddin Molla
Dhaka Division	175	Dhaka-2	BNP	Amanullah Aman	Jamaat	Mohammad Abdul Hoque	—N/a	
Dhaka Division	176	Dhaka-3	BNP	Gayeshwar Chandra Roy	Jamaat	Md. Shahinur Islam	JP(E)	Md. Faruq
Dhaka Division	177	Dhaka-4	BNP	Tanveer Ahmed Robin	Jamaat	Syed Joynul Abedin	BSM	Sahel Ahmed Sohel
Dhaka Division	178	Dhaka-5	BNP	Nabiullah Nabi	Jamaat	Mohammad Kamal Hossain	JP(E)	Mir Abdus Sabur
Dhaka Division	179	Dhaka-6	BNP	Ishraque Hossain	Jamaat	Abdul Mannan	JP(E)	Amir Uddin Ahmed
Dhaka Division	180	Dhaka-7	BNP	Hamidur Rahman Hamid	Jamaat	Md. Enayetullah	JP(E)	Saifuddin Ahmed Milon
Dhaka Division	181	Dhaka-8	BNP	Mirza Abbas	NCP	Nasiruddin Patwary	JP(E)	Md. Zuber Alam Khan
Dhaka Division	182	Dhaka-9	BNP	Habibur Rashid Habib	NCP	Javed Rasin	JP(E)	Kazi Abul Khair
Dhaka Division	183	Dhaka-10	BNP	Shaikh Rabiul Alam	Jamaat	Jasim Uddin Sarkar	JP(E)	Bhanni Bepari
Dhaka Division	184	Dhaka-11	BNP	M. A. Quayyum	NCP	Nahid Islam	JP(E)	Shamim Ahmed
Dhaka Division	185	Dhaka-12	BRWP	Saiful Haque	Jamaat	Saiful Alam	JP(E)	Sarkar Mohammad Salahuddin
Dhaka Division	186	Dhaka-13	BNP	Bobby Hajjaj	BKM	Mamunul Haque	BML	Shahriar Iftekhar
Dhaka Division	187	Dhaka-14	BNP	Sanjida Islam Tuli	Jamaat	Mir Ahmad Bin Quasem	JP(E)	Md. Helal Uddin
Dhaka Division	188	Dhaka-15	BNP	Md. Safiqul Islam Milton	Jamaat	Shafiqur Rahman	JP(E)	Md. Shamsul Haque
Dhaka Division	189	Dhaka-16	BNP	Aminul Haque	Jamaat	Md. Abdul Baten	JP(E)	Md. Sultan Ahmed Selim
Dhaka Division	190	Dhaka-17	BNP	Tarique Rahman	Jamaat	S. M. Khaliduzzaman	JP(E)	Tapu Raihan
Dhaka Division	191	Dhaka-18	BNP	S. M. Jahangir Hossain	NCP	Ariful Islam	JP(E)	Md. Zakir Hossain
Dhaka Division	192	Dhaka-19	BNP	Dewan Md. Salauddin	NCP	Dilshana Parul	JP(E)	Md. Bahadur Islam
Dhaka Division	193	Dhaka-20	BNP	Md. Tamiz Uddin	NCP	Nabila Tasnid	JP(E)	Ahsan Khan
Dhaka Division	194	Gazipur-1	BNP	Md. Mojibur Rahman	Jamaat	Shah Alam Bakshi	JP(E)	S. M. Shafiqul Islam
Dhaka Division	195	Gazipur-2	BNP	M. Manjurul Karim Roni	NCP	Ali Naser Khan	JP(E)	Md. Mahbub Alam
Dhaka Division	196	Gazipur-3	BNP	S. M. Rafiqul Islam Bachchu	BKM	Muhammad Ehsanul Haque	JP(E)	Md. Nazim Uddin
Dhaka Division	197	Gazipur-4	BNP	Shah Riazul Hannan	Jamaat	Salahuddin Ayubi	JP(E)	Enamul Kabir
Dhaka Division	198	Gazipur-5	BNP	Fazlul Haque Milon	Jamaat	Khairul Hasan	JP(E)	Md. Safiuddin Sarkar
Dhaka Division	199	Narsingdi-1	BNP	Khairul Kabir Khokon	Jamaat	Ibrahim Bhuiyan	JP(E)	Mohammad Mustafa Jamal
Dhaka Division	200	Narsingdi-2	BNP	Abdul Moyeen Khan	NCP	Sarowar Tusher	JP(E)	A. N. M. Rafiqul Alam Selim
Dhaka Division	201	Narsingdi-3	BNP	Manjur Elahi	BKM	Md. Rakibul Islam Rakib	JP(E)	A. K. M. Rezaul Karim
Dhaka Division	202	Narsingdi-4	BNP	Sardar Shakhawat Hossain Bokul	Jamaat	Md. Jahangir Alam	JP(E)	Md. Kamal Uddin
Dhaka Division	203	Narsingdi-5	BNP	Md. Ashraf Uddin Bokul	BKM	Tajul Islam	JP(E)	Meherun Nesha Khan Hena
Dhaka Division	204	Narayanganj-1	BNP	Mustafizur Rahman Bhuiyan Dipu	Jamaat	Anwar Hossain Molla	—N/a	
Dhaka Division	205	Narayanganj-2	BNP	Nazrul Islam Azad	Jamaat	Elias Molla	—N/a	
Dhaka Division	206	Narayanganj-3	BNP	Md. Azharul Islam Mannan	Jamaat	Iqbal Hossain Bhuiyan	—N/a	
Dhaka Division	207	Narayanganj-4	JUIB	Monir Hossain Kasemi	NCP	Abdullah Al Amin	JP(E)	Md. Salauddin Khoka
Dhaka Division	208	Narayanganj-5	BNP	Abul Kalam	KM	A. B. M. Sirajul Mamun	BSM	Amjad Hossain Mollah
Dhaka Division	209	Rajbari-1	BNP	Ali Newaz Mahmud Khaiyam	Jamaat	Nurul Islam	JP(E)	Khondaker Habibur Rahman
Dhaka Division	210	Rajbari-2	BNP	Md. Harunur Rashid	NCP	Syed Jamil Hijazi	JP(E)	Md. Shafiul Azam Khan
Dhaka Division	211	Faridpur-1	BNP	Khandaker Nasirul Islam	Jamaat	Md. Elias Molla	JP(E)	Sultan Ahmed Khan
Dhaka Division	212	Faridpur-2	BNP	Shama Obaid Islam	BKM	Md. Akram Ali	—N/a	
Dhaka Division	213	Faridpur-3	BNP	Nayab Yusuf Ahmed	Jamaat	Abdul Tawab	—N/a	
Dhaka Division	214	Faridpur-4	BNP	Shohidul Islam Babul	Jamaat	Md. Sarwar Hossain	JP(E)	Rayhan Jamil
Dhaka Division	215	Gopalganj-1	BNP	Md. Selimuzzaman Molla	Jamaat	Abdul Hamid	JP(E)	Sultan Zaman Khan
Dhaka Division	216	Gopalganj-2	BNP	K. M. Babar Ali	BKM	Shuaib Ibrahim	JP(E)	Mahmud Hasan
Dhaka Division	217	Gopalganj-3	BNP	S. M. Jilani	BKM	Ahmed Aziz	—N/a	
Dhaka Division	218	Madaripur-1	BNP	Nadira Akhtar	BKM	Saeed Uddin Ahmad Hanzala	JP(E)	Mohammad Zahirul Islam Mintu
Dhaka Division	219	Madaripur-2	BNP	Jahandar Ali Khan	BKM	Abdus Sobahan Khan	JP(E)	Md. Mohidul Islam
Dhaka Division	220	Madaripur-3	BNP	Anisur Rahman	Jamaat	Md. Rafiqul Islam	—N/a	
Dhaka Division	221	Shariatpur-1	BNP	Sayeed Ahmed Aslam	BKM	Jalaluddin Ahmed	—N/a	
Dhaka Division	222	Shariatpur-2	BNP	Md. Shafiqur Rahman Kiron	Jamaat	Mahmud Hossain Bakaul	JP(E)	Jasim Uddin
Dhaka Division	223	Shariatpur-3	BNP	Mia Nur Uddin Ahmed Apu	Jamaat	Muhammad Azharul Islam	JP(E)	Md. Abdul Hannan
Sylhet Division	224	Sunamganj-1	BNP	Kamruzzaman kamrul	Jamaat	Tofayel Ahmed Khan	—N/a	
Sylhet Division	225	Sunamganj-2	BNP	Nasir Hossain Chowdhury	Jamaat	Shishir Monir	—N/a	
Sylhet Division	226	Sunamganj-3	BNP	Mohammad Koysor Ahmed	BKM	Shahinur Pasha Chowdhury	—N/a	
Sylhet Division	227	Sunamganj-4	BNP	Nurul Islam	Jamaat	Md. Shams Uddin	JP(E)	Nazmul Huda
Sylhet Division	228	Sunamganj-5	BNP	Kalim Uddin Ahmed	Jamaat	Abdus Salam Madani	JP(E)	Mohammad Jahangir Alam
Sylhet Division	229	Sylhet-1	BNP	Khandaker Abdul Muktadir Chowdhury	Jamaat	Habibur Rahman	—N/a	
Sylhet Division	230	Sylhet-2	BNP	Tahsina Rushdir Luna	KM	Muhammad Muntasir Ali	JP(E)	Mahbubur Rahman Chowdhury
Sylhet Division	231	Sylhet-3	BNP	Mohammed Abdul Malique	BKM	Musleh Uddin Raju	JP(E)	Mohammad Atiqur Rahman Atiq
Sylhet Division	232	Sylhet-4	BNP	Ariful Haque Choudhury	Jamaat	Joynal Abedin	JP(E)	Mohammad Mujibur Rahman
Sylhet Division	233	Sylhet-5	JUIB	Ubaydullah Faruk	KM	Mohammad Abul Hasan	BML	Md. Bilal Uddin
Sylhet Division	234	Sylhet-6	BNP	Emran Ahmed Chowdhury	Jamaat	Muhammad Selim Uddin	JP(E)	Mohammad Abdun Noor
Sylhet Division	235	Moulvibazar-1	BNP	Nasir Uddin Ahmed	Jamaat	Aminul Islam	JP(E)	Ahmed Riaz Uddin
Sylhet Division	236	Moulvibazar-2	BNP	Shawkat Hossain Saku	Jamaat	A. M. Shahed Ali	JP(E)	Md. Abdul Malik
Sylhet Division	237	Moulvibazar-3	BNP	M. Naser Rahman	KM	Ahmed Bilal	—N/a	
Sylhet Division	238	Moulvibazar-4	BNP	Md. Mujibur Rahman Chowdhury	NCP	Pritom Das	JP(E)	Mohammad Jorif Hossain
Sylhet Division	239	Habiganj-1	BNP	Reza Kibria	BKM	Sirajul Islam	—N/a	
Sylhet Division	240	Habiganj-2	BNP	Abu Mansur Sakhawat Hasan Jibon	KM	Abdul Basit Azad	JP(E)	Abdul Muktadir Chowdhury
Sylhet Division	241	Habiganj-3	BNP	G. K. Gouse	Jamaat	Kazi Mahsin Ahmed	JP(E)	Abdul Munim Chowdhury
Sylhet Division	242	Habiganj-4	BNP	S. M. Faisal	KM	Ahmed Abdul Quader	BML	Shah Md. Al Amin
Chittagong Division	243	Brahmanbaria-1	BNP	M. A. Hannan	Jamaat	Md. Aminul Islam	JP(E)	Md. Shah Alam
Chittagong Division	244	Brahmanbaria-2	JUIB	Junaid Al Habib	NCP	Ashraf Uddin	JP(E)	Md. Ziaul Haque Mridha
Chittagong Division	245	Brahmanbaria-3	BNP	Md. Khaled Hossain Mahbub Shemal	NCP	Mohammad Ataullah	JP(E)	Md. Rezaul Islam Bhuiyan
Chittagong Division	246	Brahmanbaria-4	BNP	Mushfiqur Rahman	Jamaat	Md. Ataur Rahman Sarkar	JP(E)	Md. Zahirul Haque Khan
Chittagong Division	247	Brahmanbaria-5	BNP	Md. Abdul Mannan	BKM	Amjad Hossain Ashrafi	JP(E)	Mohammad Kamrul Islam
Chittagong Division	248	Brahmanbaria-6	GA	Zonayed Saki	Jamaat	Md. Mohsin	—N/a	
Chittagong Division	249	Comilla-1	BNP	Khandaker Mosharraf Hossain	Jamaat	Moniruzzaman Bahalul	JP(E)	Syed Md. Iftekhar Ahsan
Chittagong Division	250	Comilla-2	BNP	Md. Selim Bhuiyan	Jamaat	Nazim Uddin Molla	JP(E)	Md. Amir Hossain
Chittagong Division	251	Comilla-3	BNP	Kazi Shah Mofazzal Hossain Kaikobad	Jamaat	Yusuf Hakim Sohel	—N/a	
Chittagong Division	252	Comilla-4	GOP	Md. A. Jasim Uddin	NCP	Hasnat Abdullah	—N/a	
Chittagong Division	253	Comilla-5	BNP	Md. Jashim Uddin	Jamaat	Mubarak Hossain	JP(E)	Md. Emranul Haque
Chittagong Division	254	Comilla-6	BNP	Monirul Haq Chowdhury	Jamaat	Kazi Din Mohammad	BSM	Md. Amir Hossain Farayezi
Chittagong Division	255	Comilla-7	BNP	Redwan Ahmed	KM	Sulaiman Khan	BSM	Sajal Kumar Khar
Chittagong Division	256	Comilla-8	BNP	Zakaria Taher Sumon	Jamaat	Shafiqul Alam Helali	JP(E)	H. M. M. Irfan
Chittagong Division	257	Comilla-9	BNP	Md. Abul Kalam	Jamaat	Syed A. K. M. Sarwar Uddin Siddiqui	JP(E)	Md. Golam Mustafa Kamal
Chittagong Division	258	Comilla-10	BNP	Mobasher Alam Bhuiyan	Jamaat	Muhammad Yasin Arafat	BSM	Kazi Noor Alam Siddiqui
Chittagong Division	259	Comilla-11	BNP	Md. Kamrul Huda	Jamaat	Syed Abdullah Muhammad Taher	JP(E)	Md. Main Uddin
Chittagong Division	260	Chandpur-1	BNP	A. N. M. Ehsanul Hoque Milan	Jamaat	Abu Nasr Mohammad Maqbul Ahmed	JP(E)	Habib Khan
Chittagong Division	261	Chandpur-2	BNP	Md. Jalal Uddin	LDP	Md. Billal Hossain	JP(E)	Md. Emran Hossain Mia
Chittagong Division	262	Chandpur-3	BNP	Sheikh Farid Ahmed Manik	Jamaat	Shahjahan Mia	—N/a	
Chittagong Division	263	Chandpur-4	BNP	Harunur Rashid	Jamaat	Billal Hossain Miyaji	JP(E)	Mahmud Alam
Chittagong Division	264	Chandpur-5	BNP	Md. Mominul Haque	LDP	Md. Neyamul Bashir	JP(E)	Mirza Ghiyasuddin
Chittagong Division	265	Feni-1	BNP	Rafiqul Alam Majnu	Jamaat	E. S. M. Kamal Uddin	JP(E)	Motaher Hossain Chowdhury
Chittagong Division	266	Feni-2	BNP	Joynal Abedin	AB Party	Mojibur Rahman Bhuiyan Monju	—N/a	
Chittagong Division	267	Feni-3	BNP	Abdul Awal Mintoo	Jamaat	Mohammad Fakhruddin	JP(E)	Md. Abu Sufian
Chittagong Division	268	Noakhali-1	BNP	Mahbub Uddin Khokon	Jamaat	Muhammad Saifullah	JP(E)	Md. Nurul Amin
Chittagong Division	269	Noakhali-2	BNP	Zainul Abdin Farroque	NCP	Sultan Mohammed Zakaria	JP(E)	Md. Shahadat Hossain
Chittagong Division	270	Noakhali-3	BNP	Barkat Ullah Bulu	Jamaat	Borhan Uddin	—N/a	
Chittagong Division	271	Noakhali-4	BNP	Md. Shahjahan	Jamaat	Ishak Khondaker	JP(E)	Md. Shariful Islam
Chittagong Division	272	Noakhali-5	BNP	Muhammad Fakhrul Islam	Jamaat	Belayet Hossain	JP(E)	Khawaja Tanvir Ahmed
Chittagong Division	273	Noakhali-6	BNP	Mahbuber Rahman Samim	NCP	Abdul Hannan Masud	JP(E)	A. T. M. Nabi Ullah
Chittagong Division	274	Lakshmipur-1	BNP	Shahadat Hossain Salim	NCP	Mahbub Alam	JP(E)	Mohammad Mahmudur Rahman
Chittagong Division	275	Lakshmipur-2	BNP	Abul Khair Bhuiyan	Jamaat	Ruhul Amin Bhuiyan	—N/a	
Chittagong Division	276	Lakshmipur-3	BNP	Shahid Uddin Chowdhury Anee	Jamaat	Rezaul Karim	JP(E)	A. K. M. Mohi Uddin
Chittagong Division	277	Lakshmipur-4	BNP	Ashrafuddin Nijan	Jamaat	Ashrafur Rahman Hafizullah	—N/a	
Chittagong Division	278	Chittagong-1	BNP	Nurul Amin	Jamaat	Mohammad Saifur Rahman	JP(E)	Syed Shahadat Hossain
Chittagong Division	279	Chittagong-2	BNP	Sarwar Alamgir	Jamaat	Mohammad Nurul Amin	—N/a	
Chittagong Division	280	Chittagong-3	BNP	Mostafa Kamal Pasha	Jamaat	Mohammad Alauddin Sikder	—N/a	
Chittagong Division	281	Chittagong-4	BNP	Aslam Chowdhury	Jamaat	Anowar Siddiqui Chowdhury	—N/a	
Chittagong Division	282	Chittagong-5	BNP	Mir Mohammed Helal Uddin	BKM	Md. Nasir Uddin	—N/a	
Chittagong Division	283	Chittagong-6	BNP	Giasuddin Quader Chowdhury	Jamaat	Shahjahan Manju	—N/a	
Chittagong Division	284	Chittagong-7	BNP	Humam Quader Chowdhury	Jamaat	A. T. M. Rezaul Karim	JP(E)	Md. Mehdi Rashed
Chittagong Division	285	Chittagong-8	BNP	Ershad Ullah	NCP	Jobairul Hasan Arif	—N/a	
Chittagong Division	286	Chittagong-9	BNP	Mohammad Abu Sufian	Jamaat	Fazlul Haque	—N/a	
Chittagong Division	287	Chittagong-10	BNP	Sayeed Al Noman	Jamaat	Muhammad Shamsuzzaman Helali	JP(E)	Mohammad Emdad Hossain Chowdhury
Chittagong Division	288	Chittagong-11	BNP	Amir Khasru Mahmud Chowdhury	Jamaat	Mohammad Shafiul Alam	JP(E)	Abu Taher
Chittagong Division	289	Chittagong-12	BNP	Enamul Haque Enam	Jamaat	Mohammad Faridul Alam	JP(E)	Farid Ahmed Chowdhury
Chittagong Division	290	Chittagong-13	BNP	Sarwar Jamal Nizam	Jamaat	Mahmudul Hasan Chowdhury	JP(E)	Abdur Rob Chowdhury
Chittagong Division	291	Chittagong-14	BNP	Jashim Uddin Ahammed	LDP	Omar Faruque	JP(E)	Mohammad Badshah Mia
Chittagong Division	292	Chittagong-15	BNP	Najmul Mostafa Amin	Jamaat	Shajahan Chowdhury	—N/a	
Chittagong Division	293	Chittagong-16	BNP	Miskatul Islam Chowdhury	Jamaat	Mohammad Zahirul Islam	BML	Ehsanul Haque
Chittagong Division	294	Cox's Bazar-1	BNP	Salahuddin Ahmed	Jamaat	Abdullah Al Faruk	—N/a	
Chittagong Division	295	Cox's Bazar-2	BNP	Alamgir Mohammad Mahfuzullah Farid	Jamaat	A. H. M. Hamidur Rahman Azad	JP(E)	Md. Mahmudul Karim
Chittagong Division	296	Cox's Bazar-3	BNP	Lutfur Rahman Kajal	Jamaat	Shahidul Alam Bahadur	—N/a	
Chittagong Division	297	Cox's Bazar-4	BNP	Shahjahan Chowdhury	Jamaat	Nur Ahmed Anwari	—N/a	
Chittagong Division	298	Khagrachari	BNP	Wadud Bhuiyan	Jamaat	Md. Eyakub Ali	JP(E)	Mithila Roja
Chittagong Division	299	Rangamati	BNP	Dipen Dewan	BKM	Muhammad Abu Bakr Siddique	JP(E)	Ashok Talukder
Chittagong Division	300	Bandarban	BNP	Saching Prue Jerry	NCP	Abu Sayeed Md. Shuja Uddin	JP(E)	Abu Jafar Mohammad Wali Ullah

== Campaign ==
=== Major campaign issues ===
==== Unemployment ====
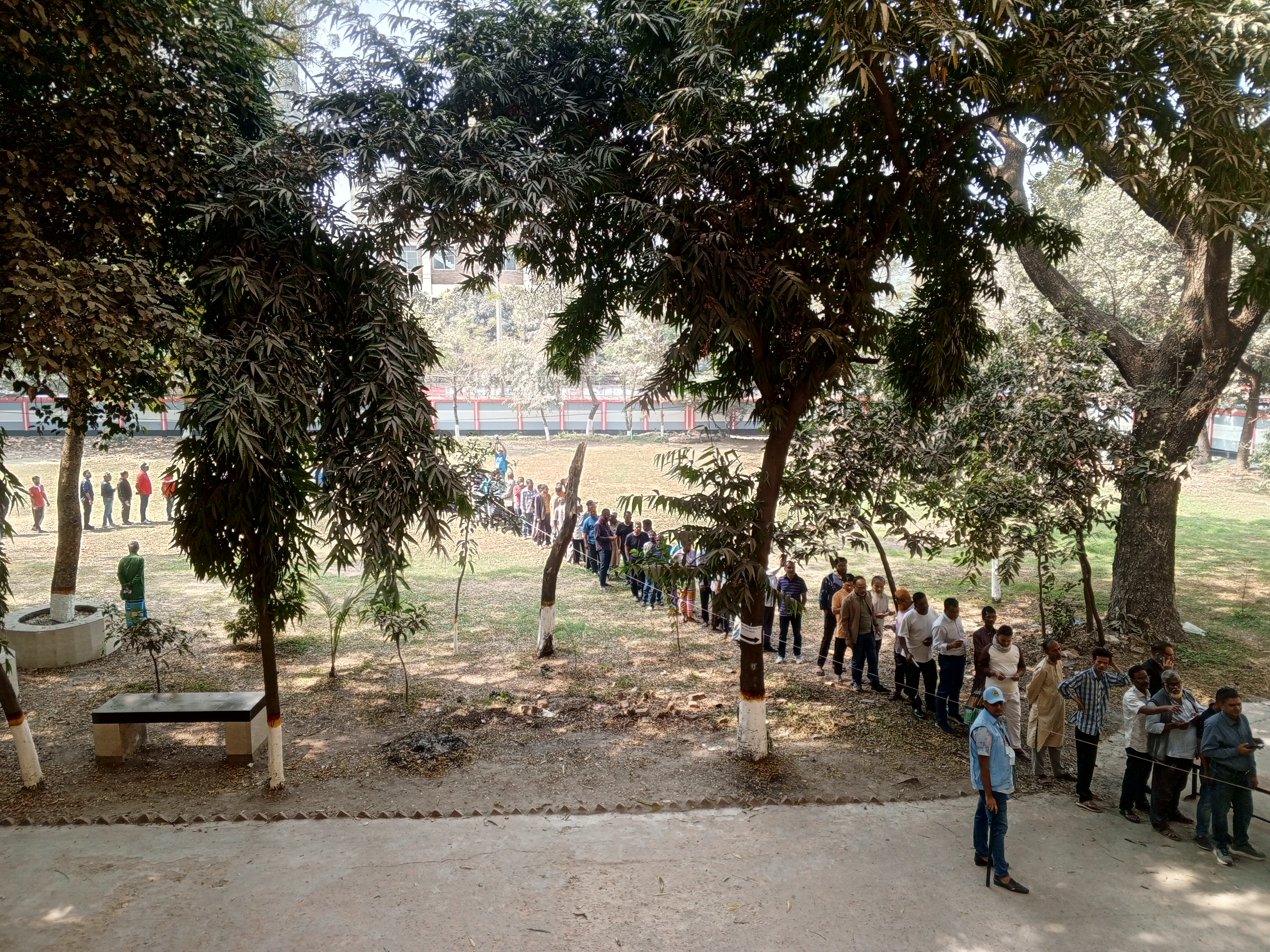
Queue of male voters at Government Music College, Dhaka, on the day of election

Unemployment has been a major problem for the Bangladeshi economy, especially affecting the youth. According to a Bangladesh Bureau of Statistics report, Bangladesh's overall unemployment rate stood at 4.48% in 2024, compared to 4.15% in 2023. In 2024, 87% of the unemployed were educated, and 21% of them were graduates, showing the lack of job growth needed to accommodate the increasing workforce. A 2024 study found that 55% of the Bangladeshi youth wished to leave the country due to the rising unemployment rate. Unemployment was one of the core factors behind the July Revolution of 2024.

==== Corruption ====
Corruption remains a major national issue. Bangladesh ranked 152nd out of 182 countries in the Transparency International's Corruption Perception Index in 2025, slipping from 151 in 2024. The issue of corruption took a central stage in election campaigns.

==== Extortion ====
Extortion in the country grew unprecedentedly in the Aftermath of the July Uprising. The parties like BNP and NCP (along with its affiliates Students Against Discrimination, Jatiya Nagorik Committee and Jatiya Chhatra Shakti) faced heavy criticism for involvement with extortion. The BNP particularly faced backlash for its leaders' involvement in extortion scandals.

==== Proportional representation ====
Proportional representation (PR) emerged as a key issue among political parties in the election campaigns. The existing first-past-the-post (FPTP) electoral system has been criticised as disproportional and a key driver of political deadlock in the country. Some of the leading minor parties, including National Citizen Party, Bangladesh Jamaat-e-Islami, Islami Andolan Bangladesh, Communist Party of Bangladesh, Gono Odhikar Parishad, and Amar Bangladesh Party, had staunchly opposed the system and supported PR, where the BNP continues to support FPTP. A Shushashoner Jonno Nagorik opinion poll conducted on 1,373 person between May and July 2025 found that 71% people in the country support PR in the proposed upper house of the Jatiya Sangsad. Eight parties led by Jamaat-e-Islami organized mass demonstrations in Dhaka in support of PR on 11 November 2025. Its leaders also warned that the general election not to take place before a referendum on the July Charter.

==== Youth voters ====
Nearly 56 million of the 127 million registered voters are aged between 18 and 37, constitute about 44 percent of the electorate, many of them belong to Generation Z, the main demographic contributor to the July Revolution. Due to three previously one-sided elections, this election is expected to be the first competitive election to the cohort. According to the Al Jazeera, these young voters are unified "less by ideology than by a shared suspicion of institutions, which, for most of their adult lives, have failed to represent them". The youth vote bank have been a focal point of party campaigns, and is widely considered to be the turning factor in the election.

==== Hindu and Awami League voters ====
Many Hindus voted for the Awami League in the previous general elections. Due to absence of the party in the 2026 election, parties such as the BNP and the Jamaat-e-Islami actively conducted programmes to attract the Hindu voters. BBC Bangla reported that the BNP maintains a stronghold amongst the Hindu voters, and the party promised to create a special tribunal and a security cell to prevent communal violence against religious minorities. Two leaders of the Vishwa Hindu Parishad were nominated from the BNP. On the other side, Jamaat-e-Islami established committees including minorities and nominated a Hindu candidate. The CPB fielded 17 minority candidates in the election, which is the highest among the competing parties.

Besides, BNP and Jamaat-e-Islami have taken strategies to attract former voters of the Awami League and its allies, which include among other things recruiting former AL politicians and promising legal protections. A significant number of AL supporters stated that they would refrain from voting in an election without "boat". Although according to University of Dhaka professor Asif Shahan, though the "core loyalists" might abstain, the "locally focused" former AL voters will vote and may become a decisive factor in the election.

Some surveys in January 2026 indicated that nearly half of the former AL voters switched their support to the BNP, followed by the Jamaat-e-Islami. According to the Communication & Research Foundation and Bangladesh Election and Public Opinion Studies, these "patterns suggest that former Awami League voters are not dispersing evenly across the party system or withdrawing from partisan preferences, but are instead consolidating their support around specific opposition alternatives". Analysing an October–November youth survey by the Bangladesh Youth Leadership Center (BYCL) in November 2025, which showed that many Awami League voters switched to the Jamaat-e-Islami, the British journalist David Bergman provided two possible reasons for this shift, first, due to the punitive stance of the BNP towards the AL at the local level, Jamaat-e-Islami has come to be viewed as the "lesser of two evils" by those AL supporters; and secondly, Jamaat-e-Islami's victory may be sought to a group of AL supporters as a "vindication", that the AL's claim to have been the "only true barrier preventing Bangladesh from sliding toward a religious state" was valid.

=== Party campaigns and preparations ===
==== Bangladesh Nationalist Party ====
Bangladesh Nationalist Party's campaign for 2026 Bangladeshi general election
- Affiliation: Bangladesh Nationalist Party
- Status: 22 January 2026 – 10 February 2026 (de jure)
- Headquarters: Naya Paltan, Dhaka, Bangladesh
- Key people: Tarique Rahman; Mirza Fakhrul Islam Alamgir; Amir Khasru Mahmud Chowdhury; Mirza Abbas; More...
- Slogans: Sobar age Bangladesh; ("Bangladesh First")
- Theme song

Music video
- Bhot diben kise, dhaner shishe ("Where to vote, in the sheaf of paddy") on YouTube

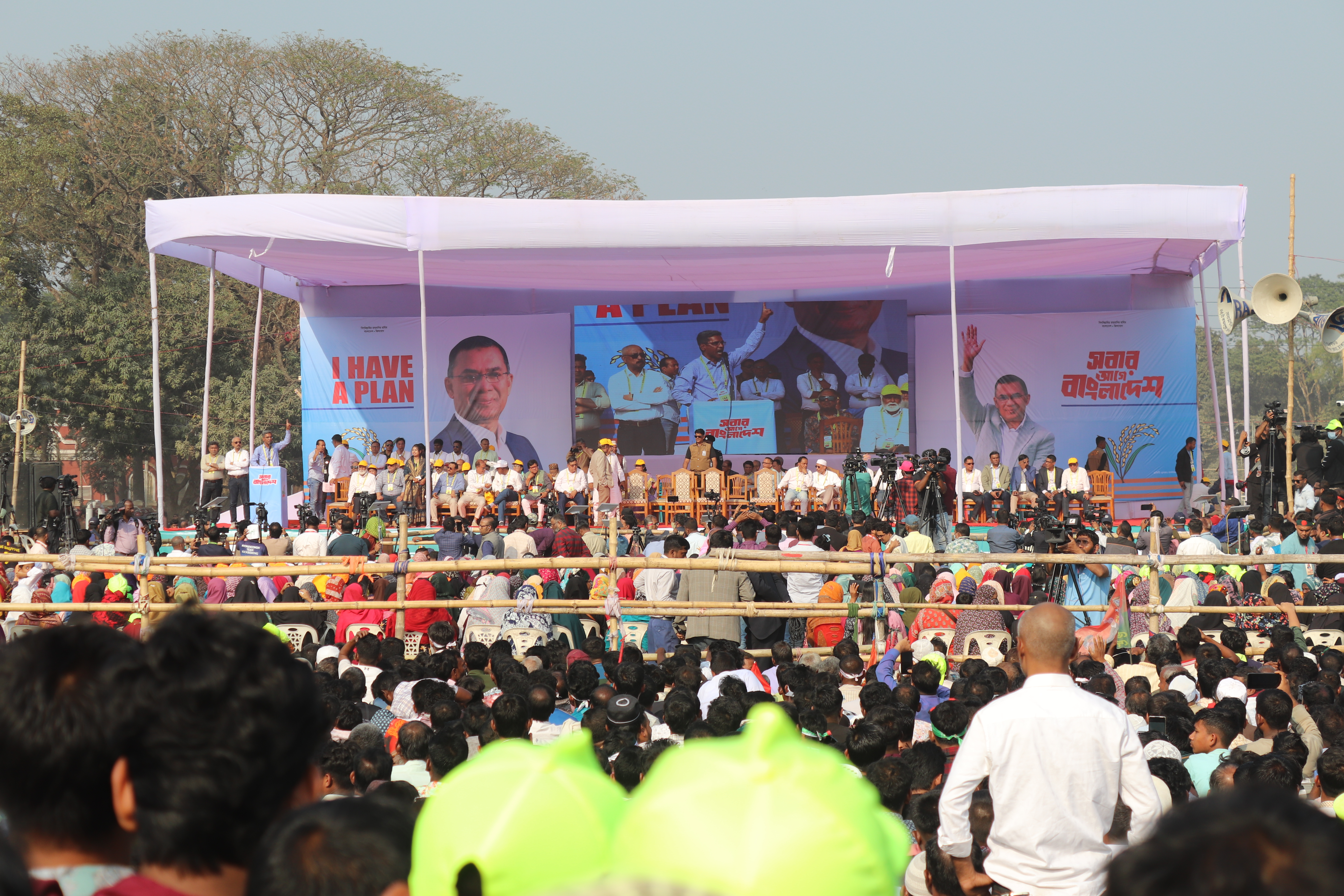
BNP Chairman Tarique Rahman delivering speech at a public gathering in Mymensingh before the election.

The BNP's primary candidate-selection started in late September 2025. The party sources reported that the candidates in approximately 200 seats were finalized by mid–October. However, the party was facing difficulties to determine candidates for 60–70 seats in due to internal conflicts and multiple strong candidates. The BNP announced their candidacy list for 237 constituencies on 3 November 2025. Its incumbent chairperson and former prime minister of Bangladesh, Khaleda Zia, would compete from three constituencies; however, serious dissatisfaction arose over the nomination in more than 40 seats, leading to frequent protests by the supporters of several nomination seekers. Party leaders feared that this might weaken the party unity in several electorates. In the second phase, the BNP unveiled a candidacy list for 36 seats, including seats of many leaders of the allied parties, alienating the allied parties, which even led to the conclusion of Bangladesh Labour Party 18-year-long alignment with the party, while two allied parties, the Liberal Democratic Party and the Jatiya Samajtantrik Dal (Rab), declared contesting in the election independently. On the other hand, the Bangladesh Liberal Democratic Party and the Bangladesh Jatiya Dal merged with the BNP.

Between 23 and 24 December, BNP announced 14 conceded seats for the allied parties, including the Jamiat Ulema-e-Islam Bangladesh, Islami Oikya Jote, Jatiya Party (Zafar), Gono Odhikar Parishad, Revolutionary Workers Party of Bangladesh, Ganosanhati Andolan, Nagorik Oikko, Nationalist Democratic Movement, and the National People's Party. On the other side, Bobby Hajjaj, leader of the NDM, Redwan Ahmed, secretary-general of the LDP, and Md. Rashed Khan, general secretary of the GOP have joined in BNP. On 28 January 2026, Nagorik Oikko pulled out of the BNP-led alliance. Due to the failure to secure nomination, many politicians who sought the BNP nomination contested the election as independent candidates, who have been identified as "rebel" candidates by the party. According to a report in Prothom Alo, efforts are being made from the top levels of the party to convince them, and action has been announced against them if they do not comply. Some leaders, including Rumeen Farhana, had already been expelled from the party because of this.

Tarique Rahman, the acting chairman of the BNP, returned to Bangladesh on 25 December 2025, after 17 years in exile. BBC Bangla reported that the BNP's electoral campaign would revolve around the personality of Tarique. However, experts think that it may create challenges for the BNP due to his controversial legacy involving the Hawa Bhaban and corruption. Additionally, during his campaign speeches, many irregularities and factual inaccuracies were detected. Opposition have also accused him of making several pledges that have already been implemented. The party is seeking to position itself as centrist and liberal. Some of its recent rhetoric explicitly acknowledged the preservation of the legacy of the Liberation War. The party also aimed to appeal to center-lef voters. BNP's key campaign pledge include the Family Card, issued to 4 million households which would provide a necessary amount of money to support monthly income of a family, and Farmer card, which would provide subsidized services to the farmers. The party also promised to create 10 million jobs within 18 months. Other promises include "one teacher, one tab" initiative, reopening mid-day meal services to the schools, expansion of deregulation of commerce, and recruiting 1 million healthcare workers.

The BNP unveiled their manifesto on 6 February 2026. The manifesto outlined 51 points within nine commitments stated to be based on the 19-point programme (1978), the Vision-2030 (2015) and the 31-point programme (2022) of the party and the July Charter — Family Card, Farmer Card, recruitment of 100,000 healthcare workers predominantly women, educational reform, meals in the primary schools, employment and youth skill development, 250 million tree plantation and 20,000 kilometres (12,000 miles) canalling, listing of the victims of the 1971 Bangladesh genocide and the July massacre, and religious harmony and digitalization of economy. Other key aspects include reinstatement of "faith and trust in Allah" to the constitution, reforms in the Article 70, establishment of ten-year term limits for the prime minister, creation of a trillion-dollar economy by 2034, increasing foreign direct investment to 2.5% of GDP, expansion of power generation capacity up to 35,000 MW by 2030, achievement of tax-to-GDP ratio up to 15%, establishment of "Truth and Heeling Commission", anti-corruption, women empowerment, honourium for imams, muezzins, khatibs, pandits and other religious leaders, and waiver of agricultural loans up to 10,000 taka.

For the first time since the 1991 Bangladeshi general election, the BNP decided to participate the elections on its own, without being in a formal or informal alliance with the Jamaat-e-Islami. The BNP general secretary Mirza Fakhrul Islam Alamgir confirmed the conclusion of its alliance with the Jamaat-e-Islami in August 2025. Political analyst Faisal Mahmud suggested that the split may be driven by the BNP's attempt to "appropriate the moral vocabulary of secular nationalism" in order to occupy the "void" left by the AL. According to him, the split can reshape Bangladesh's future political landscape "dramatically". The BNP's internal discipline was repeatedly questioned. A report from the Transparency International Bangladesh found that the party leaders and activists were behind 91% of the political violence since the fall of the Awami League on 5 August 2024.

==== Bangladesh Jamaat-e-Islami ====
Bangladesh Jamaat-e-Islami's campaign for 2026 Bangladeshi general election
- Affiliation: Bangladesh Jamaat-e-Islami; 11 Party Alliance
- Status: 22 January 2026 – 10 February 2026 (de jure)
- Headquarters: Mogbazar, Dhaka, Bangladesh
- Key people: Shafiqur Rahman; Mia Golam Parwar; ATM Azharul Islam; More...
- Slogans: Cholo eksathe gori Bangladesh; ("Together let's build Bangladesh")
- Theme song

Music video
- Inshallah jitbe ebar daripalla ("God willing, pan balance will win this time") on YouTube
- (unofficial, but widely used in the campaign)

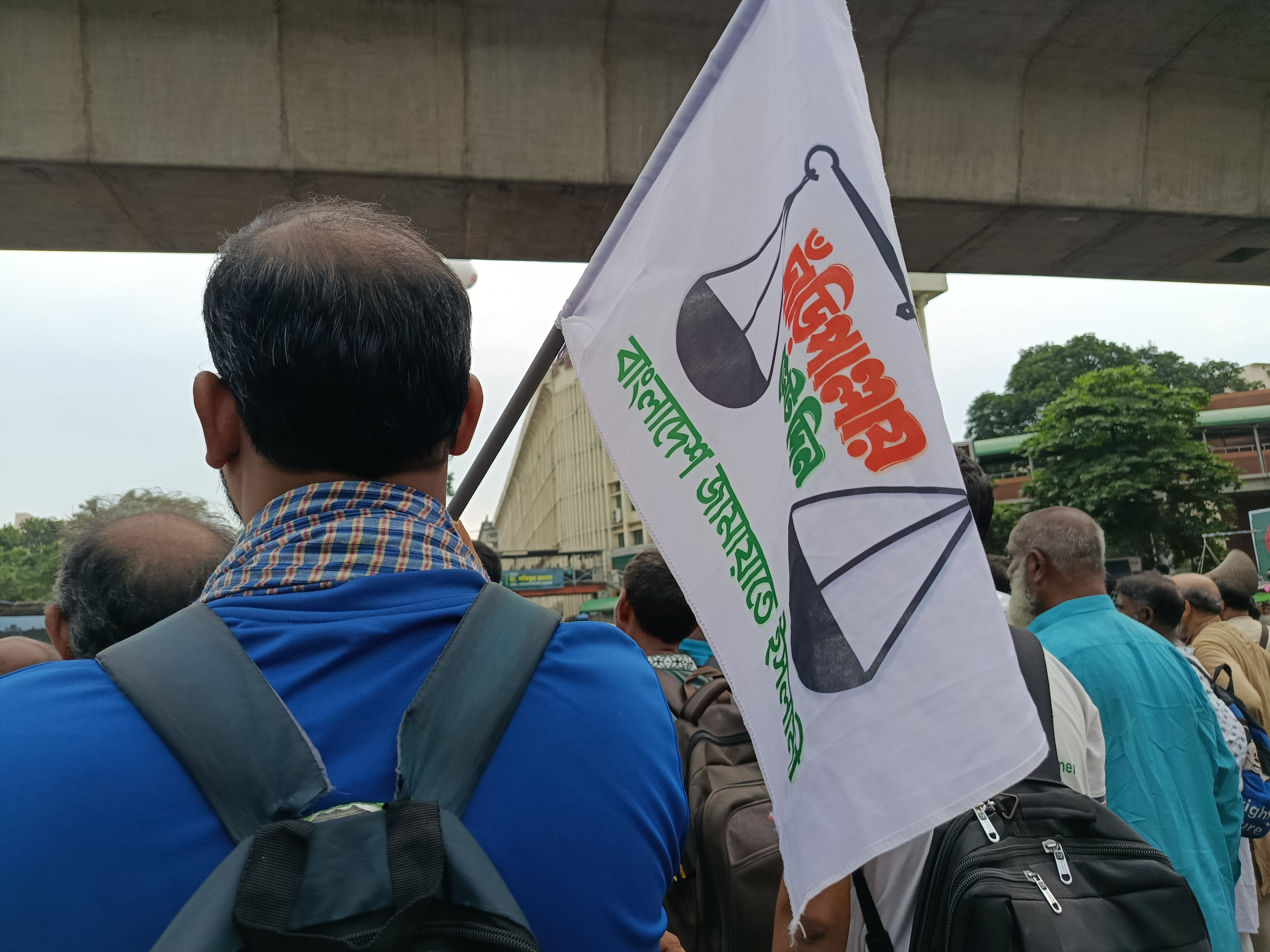
Supporter of Bangladesh Jamaat-e-Islami in Dhaka.

The Jamaat-e-Islami allied with 11 Party Alliance to campaign for five demands before the election, including a referendum for the July Charter by November, PR in the both houses of the proposed bicameral legislature, ensuring level playing field for all parties, prosecution of the Awami League government officials, and ban all activities of the Jatiya Party (Ershad) and the Grand Alliance (Bangladesh). Jamaat-e-Islami also tried to unify these parties into an electoral alliance, however, later it was decided to form an electoral convenience. Prothom Alo reported that they were also tying to connect with NCP, AB Party and GOP. On 28 December 2025, Jamaat-e-Islami announced an electoral alliance with the Liberal Democratic Party and the National Citizen Party. The Bangladesh Labour Party also joined the alliance on 24 January 2025. On the other hand, Islami Andolan Bangladesh, a founding member of alliance, left the alliance after failing to compromise seats. Prothom Alo also reported that approximately 80% candidates of the Jamaat-e-Islami's primary nomination list are new, who have no pior experience of contesting a general election. The party sources say that it is an attempt to bring young leadership to the forefront.

The Jamaat-e-Islami is trying to position itself as the "vanguard of the July Uprising" and a "viable alternative to established political parties, such as Awami League and BNP", both of which have controversial records in governance. According to the political analyst Saleh Uddin Ahmad, the party has created an image of a relatively corruption-free and a modest party, which may give them an upper hand in the election. Despite this, he also pointed out that the party's religious ideology and historical legacy may hinder the party's electoral campaign. The BBC reported that many younger voters separate the contemporary form of the party from its history and do not consider its 1971 stance as a "red line". According to professor Tawfique Haque of North South University, the Gen Z do not want to be "bogged with this debate", considering the party a "fellow victim of Hasina's rule".

Jamaat-e-Islami's campaign promises heavily concentrated on interest-free loans and tax cuts. The party pledged to introduce "smart social security card", which would bring all the government services under a single umbrella. The party also promised to train 10 million youth and to develop 1.5 million entrepreneurs and 500,000 million freelancers within five years. Other pledges include interest-free student loans, extensive consumer tax cuts, freezing industrial utility tariffs for three years, reopening closed factories under combined public and private ownership with 10% allocation for the workers, and free healthcare for the older citizens and children.

Jamaat-e-Islami published its manifesto on 4 February 2026. Titled the "people's manifesto", it contained 41 categories and prioritized 26 areas, including youth leadership, universal civil, special provisions for disadvantaged individuals and backward communities, safe and inclusive participation of women in state affairs, gradual introduction of universal healthcare and universal education as well as lowering their costs, social security and reduction of consumer inflation, establishment of good governance, ensuring judicial freedom, ensuring freedom of faith, establishment of peace in the Hill Tracts, welfare of women and hijras, anti-corruption, providing employment and creation of a skilled workforce, socioeconomic development, and building a self-reliant country. Most emphasis was placed on healthcare sector. Other key aspects include introduction of mandatory military service for all citizens aged between 18 and 22 regardless of gender, and "significantly" nominating women to the cabinet. Although not included in the manifesto, its emir (president) Shafiqur Rahman promised to reduce female working hours in the ceremony, a move for which he was previously criticized, which he clarified to be executed after the maternity leave with the "consent of mothers".

The party's resurgence prompted debate over whether the country is ready to be governed by an Islamist party. Some fear it could seek to enforce sharia or try to restrict women's rights and freedoms. Jamaat-e-Islami Emir promised not to implement sharia law if they form a government. According to The Washington Post, the US has expanded engagement with the Jamaat-e-Islami. In a leaked recording, an American diplomat reportedly said that the US does not believe that the party is able to implement Sharia, and if they attempt to act with regards to the US, then the US "would have 100 percent tariffs put on them the next day".

==== National Citizen Party ====
National Citizen Party's campaign for 2026 Bangladeshi general election
- Affiliation: National Citizen Party; 11 Party Alliance
- Status: 22 January 2026 – 10 February 2026 (de jure)
- Headquarters: Banglamotor, Dhaka, Bangladesh
- Key people: Nahid Islam; Akhter Hossain; Sarjis Alam; Hasnat Abdullah; Nasiruddin Patwary; More...; Formerly: Tasnim Jara
- Slogans: Notun chokhe Bangladesh; ("Bangladesh in new perspective")
- Theme song

Music video
- Bhoter michhile amar protik shapla koli ("My symbol in the voting procession, the water lily bud") on YouTube

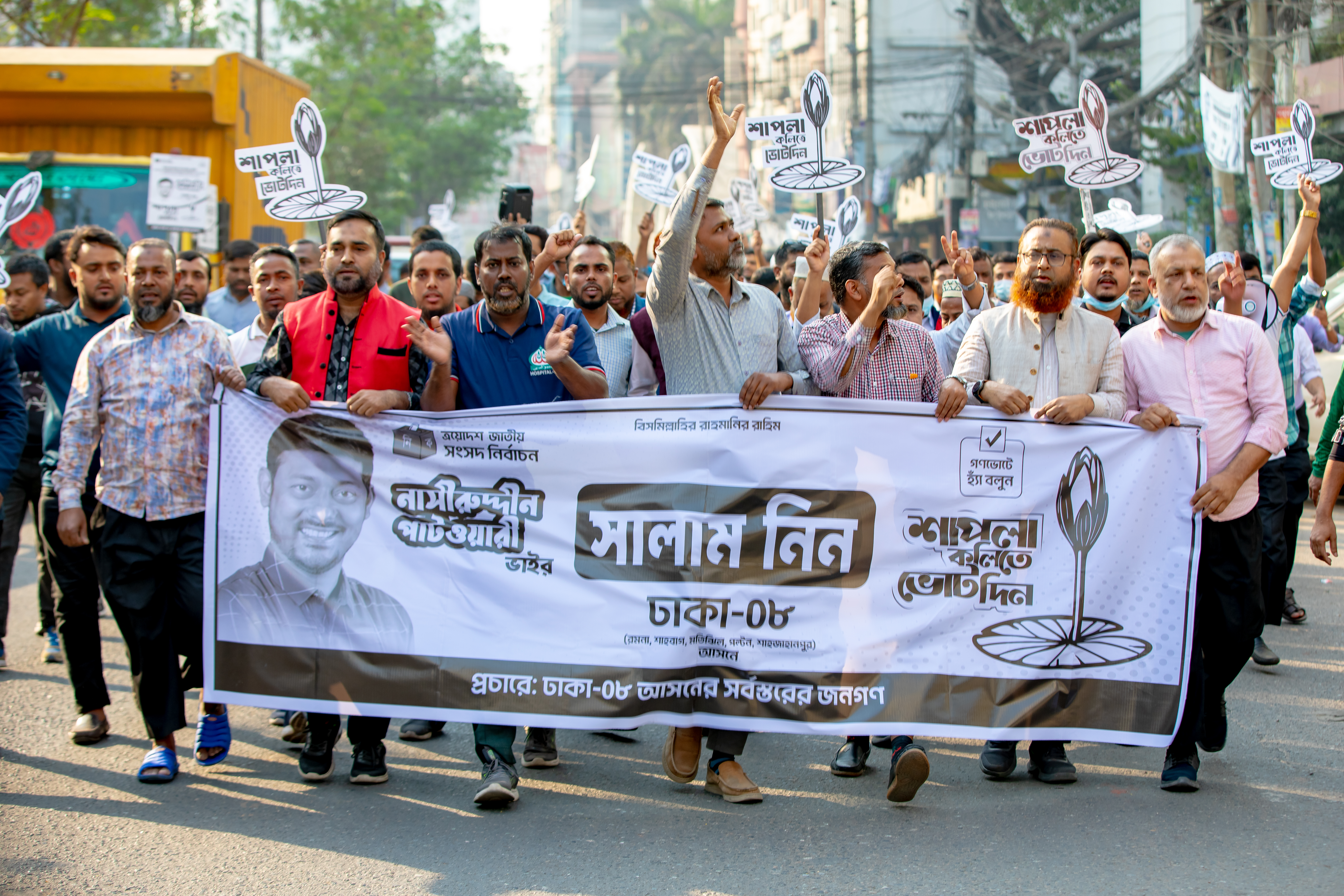
NCP candidate Nasiruddin Patwary's election rallies at Dhaka-8

The NCP published their "Manifesto of New Bangladesh" on 3 August 2025 at Central Shaheed Minar, Dhaka. Although not a formal electoral manifesto, it outlined their party policies and agenda if they form a government. The manifesto promises a new constitution, state recognition of the July Uprising and July massacre, minimization of the role of black money in politics, introduction of "whistleblower protection law" and "Village Parliament", dissolution of the Rapid Action Battalion, introduction of universal healthcare, increased state funding on STEM education, artificial intelligence and biotechnology research, increase of reserved-for-women seats in the Jatiya Sangsad to 100, recognition of houseworks in the GDP, establishment of a "Permanent Labor Commission", green technology, strong foreign and defence policy and bilateral solutions to the issues like deaths along the Bangladesh–India border, water sharing of transboundary rivers and Rohingya refugee crisis.

The NCP's campaign concentrated on the constituent assembly election and the new constitution, which was decided in a party meeting on 13–14 August. Their unofficial slogans include "This time people, want constituent assembly election" and "Solution to Bangladesh, a new constitution". The NCP became the first party to issue nomination forms from 6 November 2025. Notably, they kept 80% discounts for labour-peasants and injured protesters of the July Uprising. The party interviewed more than 1,000 nomination seekers among ordinary citizens nationwide over two days in November. Its leaders moved from booth to booth for suitable candidates. According to the Daily Jugantor, approximately 60% candidates primarily nominated by the NCP were non-NCP members. The party declared their primary candidacy list for 125 seats on 10 December 2025, including the seats of major leaders.

AB Party chairman Mojibur Rahman Monju hinted a possible alliance consisting of the NCP, his party, the Gono Odhikar Parishad and the 6 member parties of the Ganatantra Manch alliance in October 2025. The NCP, GOP, AB Party, Rastro Songskar Andolan, Jatiya Samajtantrik Dal (Rab), and United People's Bangladesh expressed interest to join the alliance. However, the NCP's opposition to the inclusion of UP Bangladesh, a splinter faction of the party, and GOP's internal disputes hampered the formation of the alliance. On 7 December 2025, "Democratic Reform Alliance" was established consisting the NCP, the AB Party, and the Rastro Songskar Andolan. The NCP leader Nahid Islam described it as "not only an electoral alliance – but also a political alliance".

Initially, Jamaat-e-Islami and NCP, close and supportive on the issues related to constitutional and electoral reforms, had differed on electoral activities. NCP was seen as uninterested to form an electoral alliance with the Jamaat-e-Islami and other Islamist parties. According to BBC Bangla, the faction of leftist politicians of NCP were pressuring the party leadership for this. From late December, NCP's alliance with Jamaat-e-Islami suddenly reemerged, creating significant discussion. On 28 December, Jamaat-e-Islami confirmed its electoral alliance with the NCP. Protesting the decision, NCP leaders Tasnim Jara and Tasnuva Jabeen resigned from the party, while former adviser Mahfuj Alam, who had previously expressed interest of joining the NCP, retracted from the decision. Khandakar Tahmid Rejwan, lecturer at the Independent University, Bangladesh, said:

It's unfortunate to see the leader of the political party that arguably claims to own and lead the 2024 mass uprising and depose Hasina, now become a junior partner to a major political party. ... As a result, we see defections of many top leaders of NCP, and astonishingly, by allying, it was only able to bargain for 30 seats for its own candidate. To sum up, Nahid has sold his political autonomy and image of an exclusive figure by de facto becoming subservient to Jamaat.

NCP declared their electoral manifesto on 30 January 2026. Their manifesto, named the "Manifesto of Youth and Dignity", contained 36 points (signifying the July 36). Their key pledges include lowering the voting age to 16, creating 10 million "dignified" jobs over the next five years, eradicating extortion to bring the political cost of doing business down to zero, and facilitating "reverse brain drain" by bringing talented professionals back to the country through one-off funding mechanisms.

==== Jatiya Party (Ershad) ====
Jatiya Party (Ershad) campaign for 2026 Bangladeshi general election
- Affiliation: Jatiya Party (Ershad); National Democratic Front
- Status: 22 January 2026 – 10 February 2026 (de jure)
- Headquarters: Kakrail, Dhaka, Bangladesh
- Key people: GM Quader; Shamim Haider Patwary

Since Hussain Muhammad Ershad's lifetime, the Jatiya Party had been divided into three factions — the Quader faction (led by Ghulam Muhammad Quader), the Raushan faction (led by Raushan Ershad), and the Anisul faction (led by Anisul Islam Mahmud). According to the Daily Manab Zamin significant dispute is ongoing among these factions over the party's electoral symbol plough. Each faction wants the symbol over their own nominated candidates.

On 8 December 2025, National Democratic Front, led by the Anisul faction and the Jatiya Party (Manju), was launched including 18 parties. On 23 December, the alliance declared candidates for 119 constituencies on 23 December, including the seats of top leaders of the member parties. On the other side, the Quader faction declared their final candidacy list on 26 December.

The party's campaign was limited to field meetings, leaflet distributions and mass processions, and included no major rally. Many of its leaders claimed to have been threatened and mared of campaigning freely. The party is campaigning for a "no" vote for the referendum and trying to secure the Awami League and minority votes. Its leaders believe that if AL supporters turn out at voting centres, only then the JP(E) will be able to meet its expectations and to maintain its historic stronghold in the Rangpur region.

==== Communist Party of Bangladesh ====
Communist Party of Bangladesh campaign for 2026 Bangladeshi general election
- Affiliation: Communist Party of Bangladesh; Democratic United Front
- Status: 22 January 2026 – 10 February 2026 (de jure)
- Headquarters: Purana Paltan, Dhaka, Bangladesh
- Slogans: দুনিয়ার মজদুর, এক হও!; ("Workers of the world, unite!")

The Daily Ittefaq reported that the CPB-led Left Democratic Alliance was creating a convention of progressive parties under the united front strategy, which was expected to establish by November 2025. They have reportedly contacted with Bangladesh Jatiya Samajtantrik Dal, Antifascist Left Front, Parbatya Chattagram Jana Sanghati Samiti and Democratic Cultural Unity for this.

On 29 November 2025, Democratic United Front (DUF) was announced at a national coalition, jointly organised by the CPB-led Left Democratic Alliance and the BJSD. The convention adopted a seven‑point political proposal outlining the coalition's ideological commitments and electoral strategy. Leaders called for uniting left‑wing, progressive, democratic, and "pro–Liberation War forces". The DUF declared their electoral manifesto on 23 January 2026, where emphasis were placed on the freedom of speech and expression, literary, cultural and democratic ambitions, development of youth power, and reorganization of educational system.

On the other hand, the CPB separately declared their manifesto on 3 February. Titled "electoral manifesto of changing the system", it outlines 18 points of pledges that follow: democratic reconstruction, rule of law, anti-corruption, "genuine" local governance, decentralization, electoral reform, restoration of voting rights, reduction of inequality, prevention of inflation and price hikes, employment, poverty alleviation, educational reform, "people-oriented" healthcare services reform, agricultural reform, rural development, workers' and women's rights, youth development, reform in transport and communication infrastructures, environmental protection, addressing the challenges of climate change, "people-oriented" reform in science, technology and research, right to media and information, freedom of expression, development of literal, cultural and progressive social consciousness and establishment of foreign policy based on world peace.

== Opinion polls ==
Vote-share projections
Polling agency	Fieldwork dates	Date published	Sample size	Margin of error	AL	JP(E)	BNP	IAB	Jamaat	NCP	Others	Independents	None	Decided, will not disclose	Undecided	"Can't say"/ No answer	Lead (pp)
CSI	1 – 10 February 2026	11 February 2026	64,890	—	—	—	46.6%	—	32.56%		19.86%		—	—	—	—	14.04
SHEBA/GGF	1 — 30 January 2026	10 February 2026	10,000	—	—	3%	73%	—	21%		3%		—	—	—	—	52
IILD	21 Jan — 5 February 2026	9 February 2026	63,615	± 0.9%	—	1.7%	44.1%	—	43.9%		—	3.8%	—	—	6.5%	—	0.2
EASD	18 — 31 January 2026	9 February 2026	41,500	—	—	4%	66.3%	—	13.6%		—	2.6%	—	—	—	—	52.7
Innovision Consulting	16 — 27 January 2026	30 January 2026	5,147	± 1.41%	—	0.5%	52.8%	1%	31%		—	1.5%	—	—	—	13.2%	21.8
The IAB leaves the Jamaat-led alliance on 16 January 2026
IILD/JF/PBD/NarratiV	21 Nov — 20 December 2025	12 January 2026	22,174	—	—	—	34.7%	43.8% (Note: 3.1% for IAB, 33.6% for Jamaat, and 7.1% for NCP)			4.5%	—	—	—	17%	—	9.1
EASD	20 Dec 2025 — 1 January 2026	5 January 2026	20,495	—	—	1.4%	70%	19.6% (Note: 19% for Jamaat, and 2.6% for NCP, no figure for the IAB)			5%	—	0.2%	—	—	—	51
The NCP joins the Jamaat-led alliance on 28 December 2025
BYLC	10 — 21 October 2025	10 November 2025	2,545 (Note: The survey was conducted only on people between the ages of 18 to 35.)	—	9.5%	0.4%	19.6%	16.9% (Note: This figure is for Jamaat only)		3.6%	1.5% (Note: 1.5% for "Other Islamic Parties", and 0.0% for "Other Leftist Parties".)	0.7%	—	—	30%	17.7%	2.7
CISR/IRI	13 Sep — 12 October 2025	1 December 2025	4,985	± 1.4%	—	5%	30%	30% (Note: 4% for IAB, and 26% for Jamaat)		6%	8%	—	4%	—	7%	11%	0
Like-minded 8 parties, including IAB, create an alliance under Jamaat on 19 October 2025
Innovision Consulting	2 – 15 September 2025	24 September 2025	10,413	± 0.96%	8.5%	0.4%	18.7%	1.4%	13.8%	1.9%	0.4%	—	—	9.1%	30.7%	9.1%	4.9
BRACU	1 – 20 July 2025	11 August 2025	5,489	± 1.32%	7.3%	0.3%	12%	—	10.4%	2.8%	2.5%	—	—	14.4%	48.5%	—	1.6
SANEM	20 — 31 May 2025	7 July 2025	2,003 (Note: The survey was conducted only on people between the ages of 15 to 35.)	± 2%	14.51%	3.64%	37.45%	—	21.72%	15.3%	4.99% (Note: 4.44% for "Other Islamist parties", and 0.55% for "Others".)	—	—	—	—	3.39%	16.73
All activities of the Awami League banned on 10 May 2025
Innovision Consulting	19 Feb — 3 March 2025	8 March 2025	10,696	± 0.8%	5.7%	0.4%	17%	1.1%	12.9%	2.1% (Note: NCP was not formed during the survey. Respondents were asked if they are going to support student led party.)	1.4%	—	—	21.3%	29.4%	8.6%	4.1
Formation of the National Citizen Party (NCP) by the student leaders on 28 February 2025
BRACU	15 — 31 October 2024	12 December 2024	4,158	± 1.55%	9%	1%	16%	—	11%	2% (Note: In a separate question, 40% of the respondents said that they'll vote for a student-led platform if it is launched, while 44% said they will not endorse it. Among the rest, 9% were undecided, and 8% gave no answer.)	9% (Note: 3% for "other Islamic groups", 2% for "a new political party formed by politicians", and 4% for "others".)	—	2%	—	38%	13%	5
Innovision Consulting	29 Aug — 8 September 2024	10 September 2024	5,115 (field)	± 1.4%	5%	1%	21%	3%	14%	10%	1%	3%	2%	—	34%	4%	7
Innovision Consulting	29 Aug — 8 September 2024	10 September 2024	3,581 (online)	± 1.67%	10%	0%	10%	1%	25%	35%	1%	3%	3%	—	11%	0%	10
Innovision Consulting	29 Aug — 8 September 2024	10 September 2024	Average		7.5%	0.5%	15.5%	2%	19.5%	22.5%	1%	3%	2.5%	—	22.5%	2%	3
2018 general election (Note: Widely considered to be rigged.)					74.96%	5.22%	11.73%	1.47%	—	N/A		1.76%	N/A		N/A	N/A	63.23

== Conduct ==
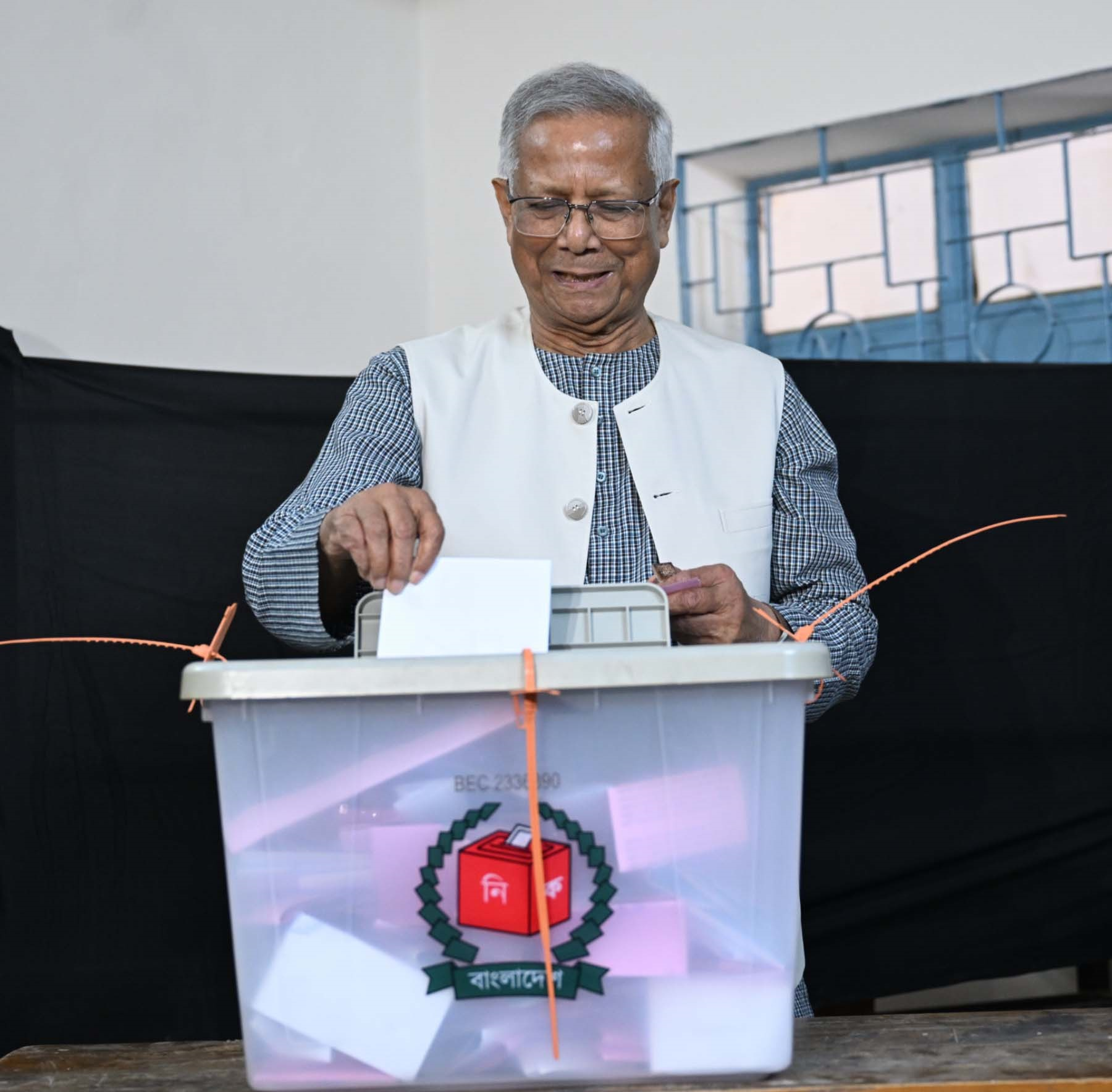
Chief Adviser of Bangladesh Muhammad Yunus, casts his vote in the election at the Gulshan Model School and College polling station.

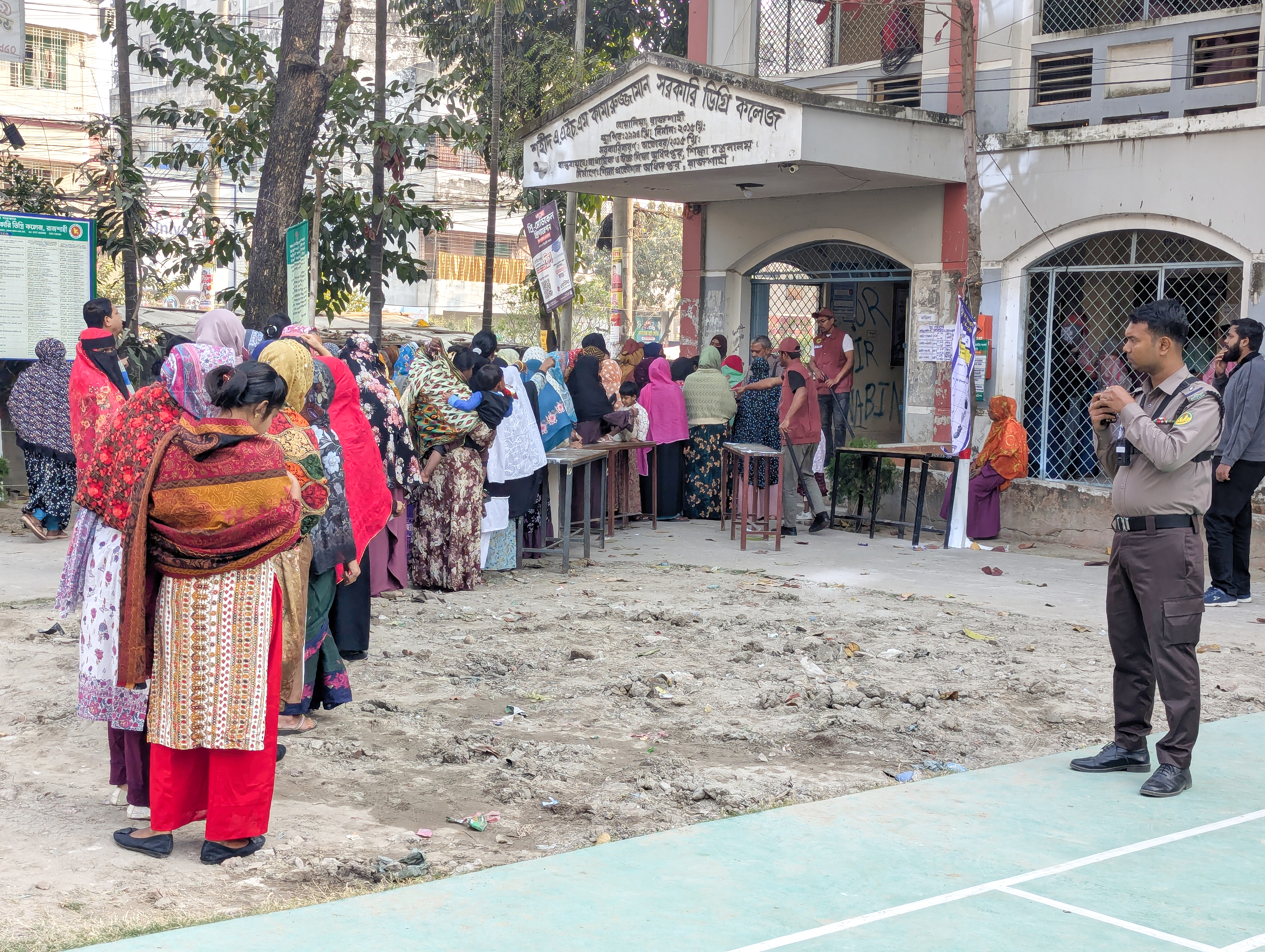
Queue of female voters at a polling station in Rajshahi.

Popular votes were taken at 247,499 booths in 42,766 polling stations countrywide. Around 785,225 election officials were on duty. Voting started at 7:30 BST (01:30 UTC) and ended at 16:30 BST (10:30 UTC). Voter turnout was moderate in the morning throughout the country. Turnout was low in Gopalganj, Hasina's hometown. The polling was described as "festive" and "Eid-like" by the Al Jazeera.

=== Irregularities ===
BNP leaders have alleged that Jamaat-e-Islami is transporting outsiders into Dhaka to cast fraudulent votes in an attempt to secure victory in the city's constituencies. The party claimed that these individuals are being housed in secret locations to influence the election outcome. BNP has called on the Election Commission and law enforcement to take immediate action against such irregularities to ensure a fair voting process. Sarwar Hossain Tushar, an 11 Party alliance candidate from NCP for the Narsingdi-2 constituency, has alleged that supporters of the Jamaat-e-Islami candidate are engaging in secret campaigning and "door-to-door" activities in violation of electoral codes. Tushar filed a formal complaint with the returning officer, claiming that these clandestine operations are intended to influence voters outside of the regulated campaigning hours and methods. He called for immediate intervention from the Election Commission to ensure a level playing field for all contestants.

On 5 February 2026, law enforcement agencies in Lakshmipur uncovered a major operation involving the production of illegal voting seals. A printing press owner confessed in court that he had manufactured fake ballot seals under the direct instructions of a local Jamaat-e-Islami leader. Police seized equipment and six fake seals intended for use on election day. Two polling agents representing Jamaat-e-Islami were sentenced to two years of rigorous imprisonment for illegally entering a polling center in Mirpur during the election. The individuals were apprehended by law enforcement after failing to provide valid identification or authorization to be present within the facility. Following a summary trial conducted by an executive magistrate, they were convicted of violating electoral regulations and imprisoned. In Bogra, Nasirul Islam, the Ward 2 secretary for Jamaat-e-Islami, was detained by a mobile court for illegally entering the Bhandari Girls' High School polling center late at night.

Jamaat-e-Islami leaders have accused BNP of election irregularities, lodging official complaints to the Election Commission and pledged to resist any violence on election day. On 28 January, a Jamaat-e-Islami leader was killed by BNP activists in Sherpur District. On the eve of election, BNP leader Manjurul Ahsan Munshi was seen threatening voters in Comilla District to vote for a candidate part of the BNP alliance. In a video that went viral, Munshi was heard saying, "If BNP comes to power and you vote for another party, I will not spare any of you. If necessary, I will burn your houses to ashes."

After this, the BNP immediately expelled Manjurul Ahsan Munshi for the statement. This move by the party leadership, led by Senior Joint Secretary General Ruhul Kabir Rizvi, highlights the party's efforts to maintain internal discipline amidst the high-stakes political environment of the 2026 electoral cycle. On the same day, a BNP leader in Shariatpur District, Mojibur Rahman Madbor, was arrested with huge cache of weapons by the Joint Forces. He was previously an activist of the Awami League before joining the BNP following Sheikh Hasina's ouster in 2024. Three more BNP activists were arrested by the Army on the same day in Bogra District with a pistol, five rounds of ammunition and 35 varied local weapons. Two of the arrested were BNP activists and one was a leader of the BNP-affiliated Bangladesh Jatiotabadi Swechhasebak Dal. Local BNP leaders and activists confessed their involvement with the party. On the eve of the election, both BNP and Jamaat-e-Islami leaders and activists were arrested with a large amount of cash and weapons.

Human Rights Support Society (HRSS) had deployed 565 observers for the election but about 48 observers were denied entry to counting rooms. In a few cases, they were obstructed either by election officials or supporters of candidates. According to an official with HRSS, 393 incidents of irregularities and clashes were recorded on the polling day. About 21 polling centres showed signs of irregularities.

== Referendum ==
A constitutional referendum took place in Bangladesh on 12 February 2026, alongside the general election. Voters were asked about the provisions of the July Charter and related amendments to the Constitution of Bangladesh. "July National Charter (Constitutional Amendment) Implementation Order, 2025" were issued for this purpose.

Choice	Votes	%
For	47,225,980	68.26
Against	21,960,231	31.74
Total	69,186,211	100.00
Valid votes	69,186,211	90.30
Invalid/blank votes	7,435,196	9.70
Total votes	76,621,407	100.00
Registered voters/turnout	127,711,793	60.00
Source: Prothom Alo

== Observation ==
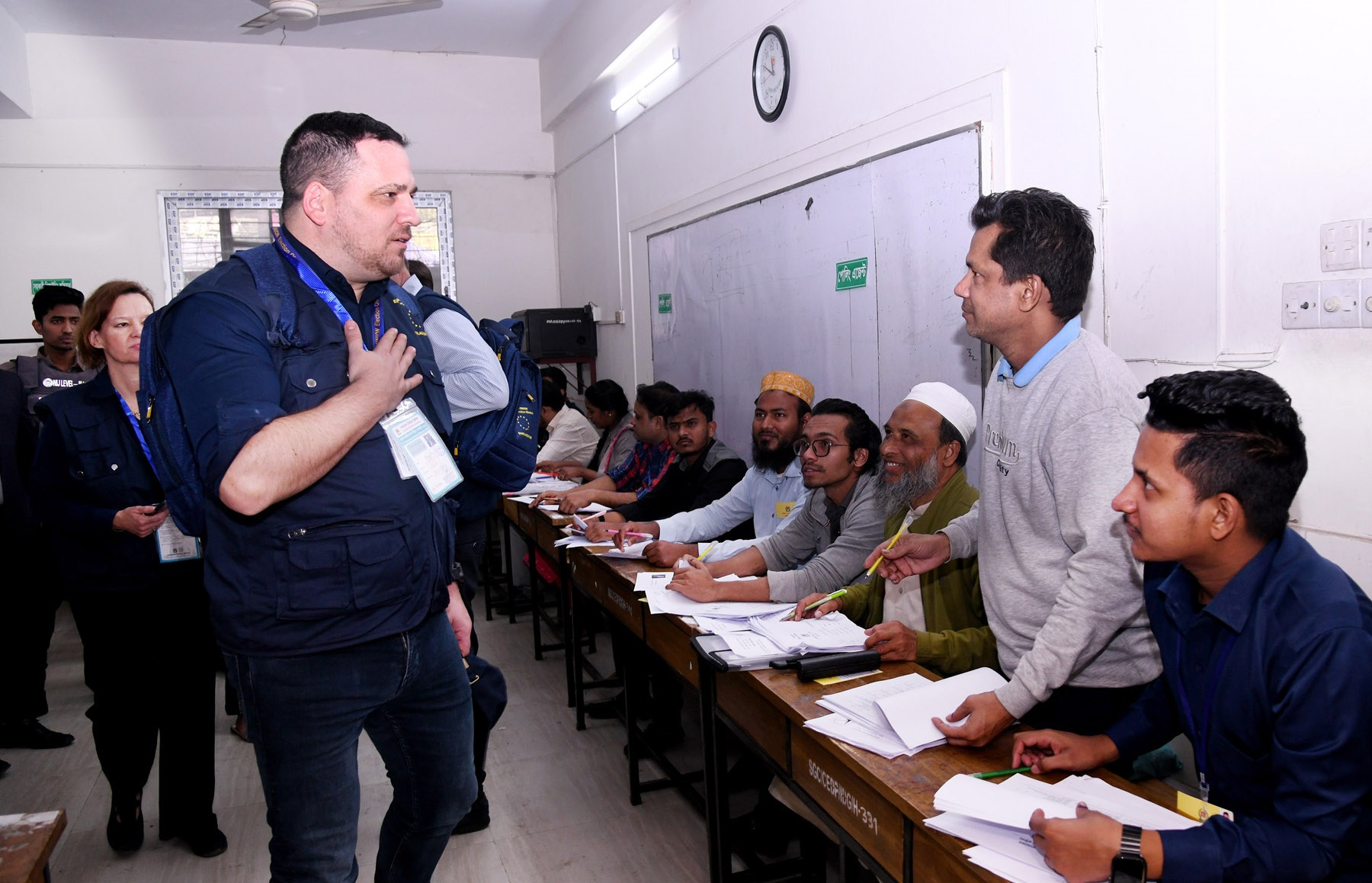
The European Union election observation team visiting the Siddheswari Girls' College polling station in Dhaka during the election

50,454 national and 500 international observers registered to monitor the election. The Election Commission invited five organizations to observe the election, including the United Nations (UN), the European Union (EU), International Republican Institute, National Democratic Institute, and the Commonwealth. Amongst them, the UN declined the invitation, while the EU and the Commonwealth responded positively.

The EU conducted an election observation mission at the invitation of the interim government and the EC. The mission was launched on 11 January 2026, one month before the election and led by chief observer Ivars Ijabs. On 17 January 56 long-term observers were deployed across the country. The mission included 200 observers from all 27 EU member states, as well as Canada, Norway, and Switzerland. The Commonwealth conducted an election observation mission led by Nana Akufo-Addo, along with 13 other members, including Ras Adiba Radzi, Mohamed Waheed Hassan, and David J. Francis.

== Results ==
The BNP won a landslide victory in the election, securing 209 of the 297 published seats outright, while its allied parties secured 3 seats. The Jamaat-e-Islami came second, securing 68 seats, the highest ever number of seats in its history, while its allies secured 9 seats.

=== Analysis ===
The success of the BNP has been attributed to the absence of AL in the election and party's familiarity and perceived experience among the voters, as well as voter's concern for the rise of right-wing politics/extremism. Also, the BNP got advantages from the internal division between the major Islamist groups such as the Jamaat, Islami Andolan and the Hefazat-e-Islam, that fractured the Islamist vote bank ultimately reducing Jamaat's votes.

The Jamaat mostly won in the constituencies adjacent to western Indian borders in the Khulna Division, which has been attributed mainly to the anti-India sentiment in the area. Regionally, it's the same area of Rajshahi and Khulna Divisions where the armed leftist groups were active previously. According to Indian analysts, Jamaat's victory in the border areas might has influenced the 2026 West Bengal Legislative Assembly election, particularly the Bharatiya Janata Party (BJP)'s campaign. Another factor of Jamaat's electoral success is the "rebel candidates" of the BNP in 78 constituencies, who contested as independent candidates against their party candidates. This roughly bifurcated the party's local electorate in at least 28 constituencies, enabling the Jamaat candidates to win in 21 of them. The Jamaat also did considerably better in Rangpur Division, a former stronghold for the Jatiya Party where Awami League or BNP was traditionally weak.

According to Hasan Ferdous, Jamaat's perceived patriarchal rhetoric demotivated many women to vote for the party, thus many women shifted to BNP. However, Nazmul Ahasan of Netra News disputed the claim, as their analysis found that women outnumbered men in some polling stations in centres that the Jamaat carried outside of Dhaka, where men outnumbered in centres that the BNP carried. Socially conservative women also favoured the Jamaat.

=== Results by alliance or party ===
Results by party (right) and alliance (left)
Party or alliance		Seats
Party or alliance		General
BNP+	Bangladesh Nationalist Party	210
BNP+	Gono Odhikar Parishad	1
BNP+	Ganosanhati Andolan	1
BNP+	Bangladesh Jatiya Party	1
BNP+	Nationalist Democratic Movement	0
BNP+	National People's Party	0
BNP+	Revolutionary Workers Party of Bangladesh	0
BNP+	Jamiat Ulema-e-Islam Bangladesh	0
BNP+	Total	213
11 Parties	Bangladesh Jamaat-e-Islami	68
11 Parties	National Citizen Party	6
11 Parties	Bangladesh Khelafat Majlis	2
11 Parties	Khelafat Majlis	1
11 Parties	Amar Bangladesh Party	0
11 Parties	Bangladesh Labour Party	0
11 Parties	Bangladesh Khilafat Andolan	0
11 Parties	Liberal Democratic Party	0
11 Parties	Nizam-e-Islam Party	0
11 Parties	Bangladesh Development Party	0
11 Parties	Jatiya Ganotantrik Party	0
11 Parties	Total	77
DUF	Communist Party of Bangladesh	0
DUF	Socialist Party of Bangladesh	0
DUF	Socialist Party of Bangladesh (Marxist)	0
DUF	Bangladesh Jatiya Samajtantrik Dal	0
DUF	Gano Front	0
DUF	Total	0
NDF	Jatiya Party (Ershad)	0
NDF	Bangladesh Sangskritik Muktijote	0
NDF	Bangladesh Muslim League	0
NDF	Jatiya Party (Manju)	0
NDF	Total	0
Greater; Sunni; Alliance	Bangladesh Islami Front	0
Greater; Sunni; Alliance	Bangladesh Supreme Party	0
Greater; Sunni; Alliance	Islamic Front Bangladesh	0
Greater; Sunni; Alliance	Total	0
Islami Andolan Bangladesh		1
Zaker Party		0
Insaniyat Biplob Bangladesh		0
Jatiya Samajtantrik Dal (Rab)		0
Gano Forum		0
Amjanatar Dol		0
Bangladesh Congress		0
Nagorik Oikko		0
Bangladesh Nationalist Front		0
Bangladesh Minority Janata Party		0
Bangladesh Kalyan Party		0
Islami Oikya Jote		0
Ganatantri Party		0
Bangladesh National Awami Party (Bhasani)		0
Janotar Dol		0
Bangladesh Republican Party		0
Bangladesh Muslim League (Bulbul)		0
Bangladesh Jatiya Party (Siraj)		0
Bangladesh Equal Right Party		0
Independents		7
Vacant		0
Total		298
Source: The Daily Star

=== Results by division ===
Results by division, coloured by popular vote share.

Major parties' vote share by division
Division				
Division	BNP	Jamaat	NCP	Others
Rangpur	41.95%	39.78%	6.44%	11.84%
Rajshahi	53.88%	39.71%	0.92%	5.49%
Khulna	43.55%	48.26%	—	8.20%
Barishal	47.64%	23.46%	—	28.89%
Mymensingh	51.60%	21.85%	1.63%	24.92%
Dhaka	51.41%	22.38%	5.75%	20.47%
Sylhet	59.54%	22.62%	—	17.84%
Chittagong	51.88%	28.01%	3.79%	16.32%
Total	49.63%	31.97%	3.07%	15.33%

Major parties/alliances' seat share by division
Division	Seats	BNP+	11 Parties	IAB	Independent
Rangpur	33	14	18	0	1
Rajshahi	39	28	11	0	0
Khulna	36	11	25	0	0
Barishal	21	18	2	1	0
Mymensingh	24	19	4	0	1
Dhaka	70	57	11	0	2
Sylhet	19	18	1	0	0
Chittagong	56	48	5	0	3
Total	298	213	77	1	7

=== Constituency-wise ===
Results by constituency are sourced from The Daily Star. bdnews24.com

Parliamentary Constituency			Winner				Runner Up				Margin	
#	Division	Name	Candidate	Party	Votes	%	Candidate	Party	Votes	%	Votes	%
1	Rangpur	Panchagarh-1	Muhammad Nawshad Zamir	BNP	176,169	51.18	Sarjis Alam	NCP	168,049	48.82	8,120	2.36
2	Rangpur	Panchagarh-2	Farhad Hossain Azad	BNP	174,650	57.55	Md. Shafiul Alam	JeI	128,862	42.45	45,788	15.08
3	Rangpur	Thakurgaon-1	Mirza Fakhrul Islam Alamgir	BNP	238,836	48.44	Delawar Hossain	JeI	141,017	28.63	97,819	19.81
4	Rangpur	Thakurgaon-2	Abdus Salam	BNP	121,017	51.12	Md. Abdul Hakim	JeI	115,707	48.88	5,310	2.24
5	Rangpur	Thakurgaon-3	Jahidur Rahman	BNP	132,797	59.09	Md. Mizanur Rahman	JeI	91,934	40.91	40,863	18.18
6	Rangpur	Dinajpur-1	Md. Manjurul Islam	BNP	179,314	60.4	Md. Matiur Rahman	JeI	117,481	39.6	61,833	20.8
7	Rangpur	Dinajpur-2	Md. Sadiq Riaz	BNP	144,317	58.63	A. K. M. Afzalul Anam	JeI	101,831	41.37	42,486	17.26
8	Rangpur	Dinajpur-3	Syed Jahangir Alam	BNP	139,207	48.68	Md. Mainul Alam	JeI	134,618	47.07	4,589	1.61
9	Rangpur	Dinajpur-4	Akhtaruzzaman Mia	BNP	165,577	54.41	Md. Aftab Uddin Mollah	JeI	127,666	41.96	37,911	12.46
10	Rangpur	Dinajpur-5	AZM Rezwanul Haque	IND	113,650	33.56	Md. Abdul Ahad	NCP	108,948	32.17	4,702	1.39
11	Rangpur	Dinajpur-6	A. Z. M. Zahid Hossain	BNP	205,118	50.4	Md. Anwarul Islam	JeI	190,703	46.8	14,415	3.5
12	Rangpur	Nilphamari-1	Md. Abdus Sattar	JeI	149,224	50.3	Md. Manjurul Islam	JUIB	118,160	39.8	31,064	10.5
13	Rangpur	Nilphamari-2	Al Faruk Abdul Latif	JeI	145,202	50.8	Shahrin Islam Tuhin	BNP	134,579	47.0	10,623	3.8
14	Rangpur	Nilphamari-3	Obaidullah Salafi	JeI	108,560	52.8	Syed Ali	BNP	89,102	43.3	19,458	9.5
15	Rangpur	Nilphamari-4	Abdul Muntakim	JeI	126,222	60.6	Md. Abdul Gafur Sarkar	BNP	82,086	39.4	44,136	21.2
16	Rangpur	Lalmonirhat-1	Hasan Rajib Prodhan	BNP	138,686	48.0	Md. Anwarul Islam Raju	JeI	129,572	44.9	9,114	3.1
17	Rangpur	Lalmonirhat-2	Rokon Uddin Babul	BNP	123,946	44.7	Md. Firoz Haider	JeI	117,252	42.3	6,694	2.4
18	Rangpur	Lalmonirhat-3	Asadul Habib Dulu	BNP	139,657	68.2	Md. Abu Taher	JeI	56,244	27.4	83,413	40.8
19	Rangpur	Rangpur-1	Md. Rayhan Shirazi	JeI	145,088	64.2	Md. Mokarram Hossain Sujan	BNP	69,407	30.7	75,681	33.5
20	Rangpur	Rangpur-2	ATM Azharul Islam	JeI	135,556	52.3	Muhammad Ali Sarkar	BNP	80,538	31.1	55,018	21.2
21	Rangpur	Rangpur-3	Md. Mahbubur Rahman	JeI	178,064	55.6	Md. Samsuzzaman Samu	BNP	85,498	26.7	92,566	28.9
22	Rangpur	Rangpur-4	Akhter Hossen	NCP	149,966	44.8	Mohammad Emdadul Haque Bharsa	BNP	140,564	42.0	9,402	2.8
23	Rangpur	Rangpur-5	Md. Golam Rabbani	JeI	176,411	55.7	Md. Golam Rabbani	BNP	115,116	36.4	61,295	19.4
24	Rangpur	Rangpur-6	Md. Nurul Amin	JeI	118,890	50.4	Md. Saiful Islam	BNP	116,919	49.6	1,971	0.8
25	Rangpur	Kurigram-1	Md. Anwarul Islam	JeI	141,090	53.4	Saifur Rahman Rana	BNP	123,025	46.6	18,065	6.8
26	Rangpur	Kurigram-2	Atiqur Rahman Mojahid	NCP	178,869	51.2	Md. Sohail Hosnain Kaikobad	BNP	170,335	48.8	8,534	2.4
27	Rangpur	Kurigram-3	Md. Mahbubul Alam	JeI	107,930	57.6	Tasvir Ul Islam	BNP	79,352	42.4	28,578	15.3
28	Rangpur	Kurigram-4	Md. Mostafizur Rahman	JeI	108,210	56.2	Md. Azizur Rahman	BNP	84,423	43.8	23,787	12.3
29	Rangpur	Gaibandha-1	Md. Majedur Rahman	JeI	140,726	78.7	Khandaker Ziaul Islam	BNP	37,997	21.3	102,729	57.5
30	Rangpur	Gaibandha-2	Md. Abdul Karim	JeI	122,630	56.9	Anisuzzaman Khan Babu	BNP	92,890	43.1	29,740	13.8
31	Rangpur	Gaibandha-3	Mohammad Nazrul Islam	JeI	162,457	53.7	Syed Mainul Hasan Sadiq	BNP	139,864	46.3	22,593	7.5
32	Rangpur	Gaibandha-4	Shamim Kaisar Lincoln	BNP	142,772	50.5	Md. Abdur Rahim Sarkar	JeI	139,738	49.5	3,034	1.1
33	Rangpur	Gaibandha-5	Md. Abdul Warres	JeI	89,274	54.9	Md. Farooq Alam Sarkar	BNP	73,483	45.1	15,791	9.7
34	Rajshahi	Joypurhat-1	Md. Fazlur Rahman Sayeed	JeI	165,192	51.5	Md. Masud Rana Pradhan	BNP	155,309	48.5	9,883	3.1
35	Rajshahi	Joypurhat-2	Md. Abdul Bari	BNP	158,065	63.1	SM Rashedul Alam	JeI	92,517	36.9	65,548	26.2
36	Rajshahi	Bogra-1	Kazi Rafiqul Islam	BNP	171,440	74.7	Md. Shahabuddin	JeI	57,959	25.3	113,481	49.5
37	Rajshahi	Bogra-2	Mir Shahe Alam	BNP	145,024	60.8	Abul Azad Md Shahaduzzaman	JeI	93,548	39.2	51,476	21.6
38	Rajshahi	Bogra-3	Md. Abdul Mohit Talukder	BNP	127,406	53.4	Noor Mohammad	JeI	111,026	46.6	16,380	6.9
39	Rajshahi	Bogra-4	Md. Mosharraf Hossain	BNP	155,339	58.8	Md. Mustafa Faisal	JeI	108,978	41.2	46,361	17.5
40	Rajshahi	Bogra-5	Gholam Mohammad Siraj	BNP	248,841	63.5	Md. Dabibur Rahman	JeI	143,329	36.5	105,512	26.9
41	Rajshahi	Bogra-6	Tarique Rahman	BNP	216,284	68.9	Md. Abidur Rahman	JeI	97,626	31.1	118,658	37.8
42	Rajshahi	Bogra-7	Morshed Milton	BNP	264,212	69.4	Md. Golam Rabbani	JeI	116,665	30.6	147,547	38.7
43	Rajshahi	Chapai Nawabganj-1	Md. Keramat Ali	JeI	206,893	56.0	Md. Shahjahan Mia	BNP	162,515	44.0	44,378	12.0
44	Rajshahi	Chapai Nawabganj-2	Md. Mizanur Rahman	JeI	171,227	52.5	Md. Aminul Islam	BNP	155,119	47.5	16,108	4.9
45	Rajshahi	Chapai Nawabganj-3	Md. Nurul Islam	JeI	189,640	59.9	Harunur Rashid	BNP	127,037	40.1	62,603	19.8
46	Rajshahi	Naogaon-1	Md. Mostafizur Rahman	BNP	173,864	53.1	Md. Mahbubul Alam	JeI	153,816	46.9	20,048	6.1
47	Rajshahi	Naogaon-2	Md. Enamul Haque	JeI	141,526	51.3	Md. Samsujjoha Khan	BNP	134,533	48.7	6,993	2.5
48	Rajshahi	Naogaon-3	Md. Fazle Huda	BNP	166,889	58.3	Md. Mahfuzur Rahman	JeI	119,421	41.7	47,468	16.6
49	Rajshahi	Naogaon-4	Ekramul Bari Tipu	BNP	133,924	57.9	Md. Abdur Rakib	JeI	97,585	42.1	36,339	15.7
50	Rajshahi	Naogaon-5	Md. Zahidul Islam Dulu	BNP	129,385	55.3	Abu Sadat Md. Sayem	JeI	104,747	44.7	24,638	10.5
51	Rajshahi	Naogaon-6	Sheikh Md. Rezaul Islam	BNP	108,866	52.7	Md. Khabirul Islam	JeI	97,629	47.3	11,237	5.4
52	Rajshahi	Rajshahi-1	Mujibur Rahman	JeI	171,786	50.3	Md. Sharif Uddin	BNP	169,902	49.7	1,884	0.6
53	Rajshahi	Rajshahi-2	Mizanur Rahman Minu	BNP	128,546	56.2	Mohammad Jahangir	JeI	100,370	43.8	28,176	12.3
54	Rajshahi	Rajshahi-3	Shofiqul Haque Milon	BNP	176,318	56.1	Md. Abul Kalam Azad	JeI	137,927	43.9	38,391	12.2
55	Rajshahi	Rajshahi-4	Md. Abdul Bari	JeI	115,226	51.3	Ziaur Rahman	BNP	109,461	48.7	5,765	2.6
56	Rajshahi	Rajshahi-5	Nazrul Islam Mondol	BNP	153,425	67.6	Manzoor Rahman	JeI	73,445	32.4	79,980	35.2
57	Rajshahi	Rajshahi-6	Md. Abu Said Chand	BNP	148,672	61.5	Md. Nazmul Haque	JeI	92,965	38.5	55,707	23.0
58	Rajshahi	Natore-1	Farzana Sharmin	BNP	102,726	53.1	Md. Abul Kalam Azad	JeI	90,568	46.9	12,158	6.3
59	Rajshahi	Natore-2	Ruhul Quddus Talukdar Dulu	BNP	162,841	55.6	Md. Yunus Ali	JeI	130,066	44.4	32,775	11.2
60	Rajshahi	Natore-3	Md. Anwarul Islam	BNP	119,768	64.3	Md. Daudar Mahmud	IND	66,492	35.7	53,276	28.6
61	Rajshahi	Natore-4	Md. Abdul Aziz	BNP	170,551	55.8	Md. Abdul Hakim	JeI	135,386	44.2	35,165	11.5
62	Rajshahi	Sirajganj-1	Md. Salim Reza	BNP	116,613	51.7	Md. Shahinur Alam	JeI	108,815	48.3	7,798	3.5
63	Rajshahi	Sirajganj-2	Iqbal Hassan Mahmood	BNP	176,638	56.4	Muhammad Zahidul Islam	JeI	136,595	43.6	40,043	12.8
64	Rajshahi	Sirajganj-3	Md. Ainul Haque	BNP	174,430	59.9	Muha: Abdur Rauf Sarkar	BKM	116,802	40.1	57,628	19.8
65	Rajshahi	Sirajganj-4	Md. Rafiqul Islam Khan	JeI	161,872	50.1	M. Akbar Ali	BNP	161,278	49.9	594	0.2
66	Rajshahi	Sirajganj-5	Md. Amirul Islam Khan	BNP	134,197	56.1	Md. Ali Alam	JeI	105,188	43.9	29,009	12.1
67	Rajshahi	Sirajganj-6	M. A. Muhit	BNP	171,508	62.3	SM Saif Mostafiz	NCP	103,884	37.7	67,624	24.6
68	Rajshahi	Pabna-1	Nazibur Rahman Momen	JeI	129,974	55.5	Md. Shamsur Rahman	BNP	104,245	44.5	25,729	11.0
69	Rajshahi	Pabna-2	AKM Salim Reza Habib	BNP	213,950	73.9	Md. Hesab Uddin	JeI	75,387	26.1	138,563	47.8
70	Rajshahi	Pabna-3	Muhammad Ali Asghar	JeI	147,475	50.6	Md. Hasan Zafir Tuhin	BNP	144,206	49.4	3,269	1.1
71	Rajshahi	Pabna-4	Md. Abu Taleb Mandal	JeI	137,675	50.7	Md. Habibur Rahman	BNP	133,874	49.3	3,801	1.4
72	Rajshahi	Pabna-5	Shamsur Rahman Simul Biswas	BNP	181,925	52.4	Md. Iqbal Hossain	JeI	164,994	47.6	16,931	4.9
73	Khulna	Meherpur-1	Md. Tajuddin Khan	JeI	123,271	53.9	Masud Arun	BNP	105,441	46.1	17,830	7.8
74	Khulna	Meherpur-2	Md. Nazmul Huda	JeI	96,306	52.8	Md. Amjad Hossain	BNP	85,988	47.2	10,318	5.6
75	Khulna	Kushtia-1	Reza Ahmed	BNP	165,909	65.7	Md. Belal Uddin	JeI	86,682	34.3	79,227	31.4
76	Khulna	Kushtia-2	Abdul Ghafoor	JeI	192,083	57.2	Ragib Rauf Chowdhury	BNP	143,821	42.8	48,262	14.4
77	Khulna	Kushtia-3	Amir Hamza	JeI	180,690	58.7	Md. Zakir Hossain Sarkar	BNP	126,909	41.3	53,781	17.4
78	Khulna	Kushtia-4	Md. Afjal Hossain	JeI	148,201	51.5	Syed Mehdi Ahmed Rumi	BNP	139,603	48.5	8,598	3.0
79	Khulna	Chuadanga-1	Md. Masood Parvez	JeI	211,041	57.9	Md. Sharifuzzaman	BNP	153,193	42.1	57,848	15.8
80	Khulna	Chuadanga-2	Md. Ruhul Amin	JeI	208,011	55.9	Mahmud Hasan Khan	BNP	163,877	44.1	44,134	11.8
81	Khulna	Jhenaidah-1	Md. Asaduzzaman	BNP	173,381	75.2	Abu Saleh Md. Matiur Rahman	JeI	57,055	24.8	116,326	50.4
82	Khulna	Jhenaidah-2	Ali Azam Md. Abu Bakr	JeI	195,702	52.7	Md. Abdul Majeed	BNP	175,984	47.3	19,718	5.4
83	Khulna	Jhenaidah-3	Md. Motiyar Rahman	JeI	175,857	54.0	Mohammad Mehdi Hasan	BNP	149,821	46.0	26,036	8.0
84	Khulna	Jhenaidah-4	Md. Abu Talib	JeI	105,999	57.9	Md. Saiful Islam Feroze	IND	77,104	42.1	28,895	15.8
85	Khulna	Jessore-1	Muhammad Azizur Rahman	JeI	119,093	56.0	Md. Nuruzzaman Liton	BNP	93,542	44.0	25,551	12.0
86	Khulna	Jessore-2	Mohammad Moslehuddin Farid	JeI	180,965	55.3	Sabira Sultana	BNP	146,447	44.7	34,518	10.6
87	Khulna	Jessore-3	Anindya Islam Amit	BNP	201,339	51.8	Md. Abdul Quader	JeI	187,463	48.2	13,876	3.6
88	Khulna	Jessore-4	Ghulam Rasul	JeI	176,912	57.3	Mujibur Rahman Khokon	BNP	131,917	42.7	44,995	14.6
89	Khulna	Jessore-5	Gazi Enamul Haque	JeI	132,876	61.0	Shahid Md. Iqbal Hossain	IND	85,045	39.0	47,831	22.0
90	Khulna	Jessore-6	Md. Mokhtar Ali	JeI	92,234	53.5	Md. Abul Hossain Azad	BNP	80,141	46.5	12,093	7.0
91	Khulna	Magura-1	Md. Monowar Hossain	BNP	185,338	67.4	Abdul Mateen	JeI	89,691	32.6	95,647	34.8
92	Khulna	Magura-2	Nitai Roy Chowdhury	BNP	147,896	55.8	Md. Musharhsed Billah	JeI	117,018	44.2	30,878	11.6
93	Khulna	Narail-1	Biswas Jahangir Alam	BNP	99,975	57.1	Md. Obaidullah	JeI	75,225	42.9	24,750	14.2
94	Khulna	Narail-2	Md. Ataur Rahman	JeI	118,142	60.1	Md. Monirul Islam	IND	78,457	39.9	39,685	20.2
95	Khulna	Bagerhat-1	Md. Moshiur Rahman Khan	JeI	117,527	50.7	Kapil Krishna Mandal	BNP	114,323	49.3	3,204	1.4
96	Khulna	Bagerhat-2	Sheikh Manjurul Haque Rahad	JeI	117,709	63.9	Sheikh Mohammad Zakir Hossain	BNP	66,409	36.1	51,300	27.8
97	Khulna	Bagerhat-3	Sheikh Faridul Islam	BNP	102,661	55.1	Mohammad Abdul Wadud Sheikh	JeI	83,550	44.9	19,111	10.3
98	Khulna	Bagerhat-4	Md. Abdul Alim	JeI	116,067	54.1	Somnath Dey	BNP	98,326	45.9	17,741	8.3
99	Khulna	Khulna-1	Amir Ejaz Khan	BNP	121,352	63.3	Krishna Nandi	JeI	70,346	36.7	51,006	26.6
100	Khulna	Khulna-2	Sheikh Jahangir Hussain Helal	JeI	93,789	51.6	Nazrul Islam Manju	BNP	88,197	48.4	5,592	3.1
101	Khulna	Khulna-3	Rakibul Islam	BNP	74,845	53.1	Mohammad Mahfuzur Rahman	JeI	66,010	46.9	8,835	6.3
102	Khulna	Khulna-4	SK Azizul Bari Helal	BNP	123,162	52.9	SM Sakhawat Hossain	KM	109,530	47.1	13,632	5.9
103	Khulna	Khulna-5	Mohammad Ali Asghar Lobby	BNP	148,854	50.4	Mia Golam Parwar	JeI	146,246	49.6	2,608	0.9
104	Khulna	Khulna-6	Abul Kalam Azad	JeI	150,724	54.7	SM Monirul Hasan	BNP	124,710	45.3	26,014	9.4
105	Khulna	Satkhira-1	Md. Izzatullah	JeI	193,772	53.3	Md. Habibul Islam Habib	BNP	169,995	46.7	23,777	6.5
106	Khulna	Satkhira-2	Muhammad Abdul Khaliq	JeI	266,959	69.7	Md. Abdur Rauf	BNP	116,293	30.3	150,666	39.3
107	Khulna	Satkhira-3	Hafez Rabiul Bashar	JeI	184,233	63.6	Md. Shahidul Alam	IND	105,379	36.4	78,854	27.2
108	Khulna	Satkhira-4	Gazi Nazrul Islam	JeI	106,913	55.6	Md. Moniruzzaman	BNP	85,426	44.4	21,487	11.2
109	Barishal	Barguna-1	Mahmudul Hossain Waliullah	IAB	140,291	49.45	Md. Nazrul Islam Mollah	BNP	136,145	47.99	4,146	1.46
110	Barishal	Barguna-2	Nurul Islam Moni	BNP	90,643	46.57	Dr. Sultan Ahmad	JeI	85,247	43.80	5,396	2.77
111	Barishal	Patuakhali-1	Altaf Hossain Chowdhury	BNP	152,087	58.6	Md Feroze Alam	IAB	58,161	22.4	93,926	36.2
112	Barishal	Patuakhali-2	Shafiqul Islam Masud	JeI	100,750	58.1	Md. Shahidul Alam Talukder	BNP	72,676	41.9	28,074	16.2
113	Barishal	Patuakhali-3	Nurul Haque Nur	GOP	97,323	54.5	Md Hasan Mamun	IND	81,361	45.5	15,962	8.9
114	Barishal	Patuakhali-4	ABM Mosharraf Hossain	BNP	124,013	63.9	Mostafizur Rahman	IAB	70,127	36.1	53,886	27.8
115	Barishal	Bhola-1	Barrister Andaleeve Rahman	BJP	105,543	49.51	Md. Nazrul Islam	JeI	75,337	35.33	30,206	14.18
116	Barishal	Bhola-2	Hafiz Ibrahim	BNP	119,085	56.0	Mohammad Fazlul Karim	JeI	93,703	44.0	25,382	11.9
117	Barishal	Bhola-3	Maj.Hafizuddin Ahmed	BNP	145,990	71.8	Muhammad Nizamul Haque	BDP	57,351	28.2	88,639	43.6
118	Barishal	Bhola-4	Mohammad Nurul Islam	BNP	189,351	69.9	Mohammad Mustafa Kamal	JeI	81,437	30.1	107,914	39.8
119	Barishal	Barisal-1	Zahir Uddin Swapan	BNP	100,552	68.5	Md. Kamrul Islam Khan	JeI	46,263	31.5	54,289	37.0
120	Barishal	Barisal-2	Sardar Sarfuddin Ahmed	BNP	141,622	65.7	Abdul Mannan	JeI	74,082	34.3	67,540	31.4
121	Barishal	Barisal-3	Zainul Abedin	BNP	80,930	56.9	Asaduzzaman Fuaad	ABP	61,192	43.1	19,738	13.9
122	Barishal	Barisal-4	Md. Rajib Ahsan	BNP	128,322	63.2	Mohammad Abdul Jabbar	JeI	74,684	36.8	53,638	26.4
123	Barishal	Barisal-5	Majibur Rahman Sarwar	BNP	135,146	58.7	Syed Faizul Karim	IAB	95,044	41.3	40,102	17.4
124	Barishal	Barisal-6	Abul Hossain Khan	BNP	82,217	59.5	Md. Mahmudunnabi	JeI	55,988	40.5	26,229	19.0
125	Barishal	Jhalokati-1	Rafiqul Islam Jamal	BNP	62,010	52.9	Faizul Haque	JeI	55,120	47.1	6,890	5.9
126	Barishal	Jhalokati-2	Israt Sultana Ilein Bhutto	BNP	113,419	61.6	SM Nayeamul Karim	JeI	70,556	38.4	42,863	23.3
127	Barishal	Pirojpur-1	Masood Sayeedi	JeI	132,659	55.3	Alamgir Hossain	BNP	107,105	44.7	25,554	10.6
128	Barishal	Pirojpur-2	Ahmad Sohail Manzoor	BNP	105,185	52.1	Shameem Sayeedi	JeI	96,897	47.9	8,288	4.1
129	Barishal	Pirojpur-3	Md. Ruhul Amin Dulal	BNP	63,791	63.5	Md. Shamim Hamidi	NCP	36,616	36.5	27,175	27.0
138	Mymensingh	Jamalpur-1	M Rashiduzzaman Millat	BNP	172,011	64.7	Muhammad Nazmul Haque Sayeedi	JeI	93,661	35.3	78,350	29.4
139	Mymensingh	Jamalpur-2	A. E. Sultan Mahmud Babu	BNP	95,860	60.6	Md. Shamiul Haque	JeI	62,434	39.4	33,426	21.2
140	Mymensingh	Jamalpur-3	Md. Mostafizur Rahman Babul	BNP	207,412	71.8	Md. Mujibur Rahman Azadi	JeI	81,430	28.2	125,982	43.6
141	Mymensingh	Jamalpur-4	Md. Faridul Kabir Talukder	BNP	147,406	76.6	Mohammad Abdul Awal	JeI	44,947	23.4	102,459	53.2
142	Mymensingh	Jamalpur-5	Shah Md Waresh Ali Mamun	BNP	199,344	63.8	Muhammad Abdus Sattar	JeI	113,201	36.2	86,143	27.6
143	Mymensingh	Sherpur-1	Md. Rashedul Islam Rashed	JeI	127,811	62.0	Sansila Zebrin	BNP	78,342	38.0	49,469	24.0
144	Mymensingh	Sherpur-2	Mohammad Fahim Chowdhury	BNP	118,472	52.2	Md. Golam Kibria	JeI	108,335	47.8	10,137	4.5
145	Mymensingh	Sherpur-3	Mahmudul Haque Rubel	BNP	166,117	76.9	Masudur Rahman	JeI	47,071	21.8	119,066	55.2
146	Mymensingh	Mymensingh-1	Mohammed Salman Omar	IND	108,265	51.5	Syed Imran Saleh	BNP	101,926	48.5	6,339	3.0
147	Mymensingh	Mymensingh-2	Muhammadullah	BKM	144,565	55.2	Motahar Hossain Talukder	BNP	117,344	44.8	27,221	10.4
148	Mymensingh	Mymensingh-3	M Iqbal Hossain	BNP	75,320	53.3	Ahmad Taibur Rahman	IND	65,995	46.7	9,325	6.6
149	Mymensingh	Mymensingh-4	Md. Abu Wahab Akand Wahid	BNP	177,891	51.2	Mohammad Kamrul Ahsan	JeI	169,580	48.8	8,311	2.4
150	Mymensingh	Mymensingh-5	Mohammad Zakir Hossain	BNP	128,896	55.8	Md. Matiur Rahman Akand	JeI	102,228	44.2	26,668	11.6
151	Mymensingh	Mymensingh-6	Md. Kamrul Hasan	JeI	75,946	59.1	Akhtar Sultana	IND	52,669	40.9	23,277	18.1
152	Mymensingh	Mymensingh-7	Md. Mahabubur Rahman	BNP	99,049	53.9	Md. Achaduzzaman	JeI	84,851	46.1	14,198	7.8
153	Mymensingh	Mymensingh-8	Lutfulahel Majed	BNP	107,577	70.1	Md. Aurangzeb Belal	LDP	45,791	29.9	61,786	40.2
154	Mymensingh	Mymensingh-9	Yasser Khan Chowdhury	BNP	85,761	54.7	AKM Anwarul Islam	BDP	71,168	45.3	14,593	9.4
155	Mymensingh	Mymensingh-10	Mohammad Aktaruzzaman	BNP	75,585	53.0	Abu Bakr Siddiqur Rahman	IND	67,013	47.0	8,572	6.0
156	Mymensingh	Mymensingh-11	Fakhruddin Ahmed	BNP	111,230	62.8	Muhammad Morshed Alam	IND	66,016	37.2	45,214	25.6
157	Mymensingh	Netrokona-1	Kaiser Kamal	BNP	158,343	64.4	Golam Rabbani	BKM	87,488	35.6	70,855	28.8
158	Mymensingh	Netrokona-2	Md. Anwarul Haque	BNP	171,399	71.8	Md. Fahim Rahman Khan Pathan	NCP	67,367	28.2	104,032	43.6
159	Mymensingh	Netrokona-3	Rafiqul Islam Hilali	BNP	118,469	63.2	Md. Delwar Hossain Bhuiyan	IND	68,961	36.8	49,508	26.4
160	Mymensingh	Netrokona-4	Lutfozzaman Babar	BNP	160,801	80.1	Md. Al Helal	JeI	39,840	19.9	120,961	60.3
161	Mymensingh	Netrokona-5	Machum Mustafa	JeI	82,177	50.9	Md. Abu Taher Talukdar	BNP	79,412	49.1	2,765	1.7
130	Dhaka	Tangail-1	Fakir Mahbub Anam	BNP	153,932	62.0	Muhammad Abdullah Kafi	JeI	94,462	38.0	59,470	24.0
131	Dhaka	Tangail-2	Abdus Salam Pintu	BNP	198,213	76.5	Md. Humayun Kabir	JeI	60,871	23.5	137,342	53.0
132	Dhaka	Tangail-3	Md. Lutfar Rahman Khan Azad	IND	107,901	56.6	SM Obaidul Haque	BNP	82,769	43.4	25,132	13.2
133	Dhaka	Tangail-4	Md. Lutfar Rahman	BNP	105,342	62.8	Abdul Latif Siddiqui	IND	62,509	37.2	42,833	25.5
134	Dhaka	Tangail-5	Sultan Saladin Tuku	BNP	131,279	62.0	Ahsan Habib	JeI	80,283	38.0	50,996	24.1
135	Dhaka	Tangail-6	Md. Rabiul Awal	BNP	150,952	62.2	AKM Abdul Hamid	JeI	91,914	37.8	59,038	24.3
136	Dhaka	Tangail-7	Abul Kalam Azad Siddiqui	BNP	141,253	66.5	Md. Abdullah ibn Abul Hossain	JeI	71,040	33.5	70,213	33.1
137	Dhaka	Tangail-8	Ahmed Azam Khan	BNP	114,217	59.7	Salahuddin Alamgir	IND	77,130	40.3	37,087	19.4
162	Dhaka	Kishoreganj-1	Mazharul Islam	BNP	124,035	55.1	Hedayatullah Hadi	BKM	101,132	44.9	22,903	10.2
163	Dhaka	Kishoreganj-2	Advocate Md. Jalal Uddin	BNP	143,669	54.3	Md. Shafiul Islam	JeI	120,975	45.7	22,694	8.6
164	Dhaka	Kishoreganj-3	Osman Faruk	BNP	112,466	52.3	Jehad Khan	JeI	102,476	47.7	9,990	4.6
165	Dhaka	Kishoreganj-4	Md. Fazlur Rahman	BNP	132,472	69.6	Md. Rokan Reza Sheikh	JeI	57,829	30.4	74,643	39.2
166	Dhaka	Kishoreganj-5	Sheikh Mujibur Rahman Iqbal	IND	66,450	55.0	Md. Ramzan Ali	JeI	54,400	45.0	12,050	10.0
167	Dhaka	Kishoreganj-6	Md. Shariful Alam	BNP	185,813	81.4	Ataullah Amin	BKM	42,555	18.6	143,258	62.8
168	Dhaka	Manikganj-1	SA Jinnah Kabir	BNP	137,773	63.9	Md. Tozammel Haque	IND	77,818	36.1	59,955	27.8
169	Dhaka	Manikganj-2	Moinul Islam Khan	BNP	175,776	68.3	Md. Salah Uddin	BKM	81,531	31.7	94,245	36.6
170	Dhaka	Manikganj-3	Afroza Khanam Rita	BNP	167,345	72.3	Muhammad Said Noor	BKM	64,242	27.7	103,103	44.6
171	Dhaka	Munshiganj-1	Md. Abdullah	BNP	167,562	62.3	AKM Fakhruddin	JeI	101,568	37.7	65,994	24.6
172	Dhaka	Munshiganj-2	Abdus Salam Azad	BNP	121,154	67.4	Majedul Islam	NCP	58,573	32.6	62,581	34.8
173	Dhaka	Munshiganj-3	Md. Kamruzzaman	BNP	124,691	58.4	Mohiuddin	IND	88,936	41.6	35,755	16.8
174	Dhaka	Dhaka-1	Khandaker Abu Ashfaq	BNP	173,781	59.21	Mohammad Nazrul Islam	JeI	112,622	38.36	61,159	20.85
175	Dhaka	Dhaka-2	Amanullah Aman	BNP	163,020	64.20	Md. Abdul Haque	JeI	78,655	30.98	84,365	33.22
176	Dhaka	Dhaka-3	Gayeshwar Chandra Roy	BNP	99,163	51.30	Md. Shahinur Islam	JeI	83,264	43.08	15,899	8.23
177	Dhaka	Dhaka-4	Syed Zainul Abedin	JeI	77,367	47.74	Tanveer Ahmed	BNP	74,447	45.92	2,920	1.80
178	Dhaka	Dhaka-5	Mohammad Kamal Hossain	JeI	96,641	48.2	Md Nabi Ulla	BNP	87,491	43.6	9,150	4.56
179	Dhaka	Dhaka-6	Ishraque Hossain	BNP	78,850	57.47	Md. Abdul Mannan	JeI	55,697	40.60	23,153	16.9
180	Dhaka	Dhaka-7	Hamidur Rahman	BNP	104,666	46.3	Md. Enayat Ulla	JeI	98,483	43.5	6,183	2.8
181	Dhaka	Dhaka-8	Mirza Abbas	BNP	59,366	49.3	Nasiruddin Patwary	NCP	54,127	44.9	5,239	4.3
182	Dhaka	Dhaka-9	Habibur Rashid Habib	BNP	111,212	53.1	Mohammad Javed Mia	NCP	53,460	25.5	57,752	27.6
183	Dhaka	Dhaka-10	Sheikh Rabiul Alam	BNP	80,436	51.1	Md. Jasim Uddin Sarkar	JeI	77,136	48.9	3,300	2.1
184	Dhaka	Dhaka-11	Nahid Islam	NCP	93,872	47.8	M. A. Qayyum	BNP	91,833	46.8	2,039	1.0
185	Dhaka	Dhaka-12	Saiful Alam Khan Milon	JeI	53,773	43.96	Saiful Haque	BRWP	30,963	25.32	22,810	18.63
186	Dhaka	Dhaka-13	Bobby Hajjaj	BNP	88,387	50.7	Mamunul Haque	BKM	86,067	49.3	2,320	1.3
187	Dhaka	Dhaka-14	Barrister Mir Ahmad Bin Quasem	JeI	101,113	48.88	Sanjida Islam	BNP	83,323	40.28	17,790	8.60
188	Dhaka	Dhaka-15	Shafiqur Rahman	JeI	85,131	54.20	Md. Shafiqul Islam Khan	BNP	63,513	40.44	21,618	13.76
189	Dhaka	Dhaka-16	Col. Md. Abdul Baten	JeI	88,828	48.87	Aminul Haque	BNP	85,467	47.02	3,361	1.85
190	Dhaka	Dhaka-17	Tarique Rahman	BNP	72,699	50.49	S. M. Khaliduzzaman	JeI	68,300	47.45	4,399	3.06
191	Dhaka	Dhaka-18	SM Jahangir Hossain	BNP	144,715	56.53	Ariful Islam	NCP	111,297	43.47	33,418	13.06
192	Dhaka	Dhaka-19	Dewan Md. Salauddin	BNP	190,976	56.66	Dilshana Parul	NCP	125,283	37.17	65,693	19.49
193	Dhaka	Dhaka-20	Md. Tamiz Uddin	BNP	160,428	68.94	Nabila Tasnid	NCP	56,343	24.52	104,085	44.42
194	Dhaka	Gazipur-1	Md. Mojibur Rahman	BNP	208,688	58.3	Md. Shah Alam Bakshi	JeI	149,553	41.7	59,135	16.5
195	Dhaka	Gazipur-2	M. Manjurul Karim Roni	BNP	188,606	57.2	Ali Nacher Khan	NCP	140,950	42.8	47,656	14.5
196	Dhaka	Gazipur-3	S. M. Rafiqul Islam	BNP	162,343	61.7	Muhammad Ehsanul Haque	BKM	100,539	38.3	61,804	23.5
197	Dhaka	Gazipur-4	Salahuddin Aiyubi	JeI	101,779	53.0	Shah Riazul Hannan	BNP	90,390	47.0	11,389	5.9
198	Dhaka	Gazipur-5	AKM Fazlul Haque Milon	BNP	133,869	63.2	Md. Khairul Hasan	JeI	78,123	36.8	55,746	26.3
199	Dhaka	Narsingdi-1	Khairul Kabir Khokon	BNP	161,405	62.9	Md. Ibrahim Bhuiyan	JeI	95,349	37.1	66,056	25.8
200	Dhaka	Narsingdi-2	Abdul Moyeen Khan	BNP	92,739	62.4	Md. Amjad Hossain	JeI	55,920	37.6	36,819	24.8
201	Dhaka	Narsingdi-3	Manzoor Elahi	BNP	82,061	64.2	Md. Ariful Islam Mridha	IND	45,682	35.8	36,379	28.5
202	Dhaka	Narsingdi-4	Sardar Shakhawat Hossain Bokul	BNP	163,392	67.5	Md. Jahangir Alam	JeI	78,744	32.5	84,648	35.0
203	Dhaka	Narsingdi-5	Md. Ashraf Uddin	BNP	137,690	75.4	Tajul Islam	BKM	44,981	24.6	92,709	50.8
204	Dhaka	Narayanganj-1	Mustafizur Rahman Bhuiyan	BNP	158,358	63.3	Md. Anwar Hossain Molla	JeI	91,690	36.7	66,668	26.7
205	Dhaka	Narayanganj-2	Md. Nazrul Islam Azad	BNP	124,291	60.5	Md Ilyach Molla	JeI	81,054	39.5	43,237	21.0
206	Dhaka	Narayanganj-3	Azharul Islam Mannan	BNP	155,400	53.5	Md. Iqbal Hossain Bhuiyan	JeI	134,918	46.5	20,482	7.0
207	Dhaka	Narayanganj-4	Abdullah Al Amin	NCP	106,171	56.8	Monir Hossain	JUIB	80,619	43.2	25,552	13.7
208	Dhaka	Narayanganj-5	Abul Kalam	BNP	114,799	53.2	ABM Sirajul Mamun	BKM	101,196	46.8	13,603	6.3
209	Dhaka	Rajbari-1	Ali Newaz Mahmud Khaiyam	BNP	154,541	60.5	Md. Nurul Islam	JeI	101,092	39.5	53,449	21.0
210	Dhaka	Rajbari-2	Md. Haroon-or-Rashid	BNP	237,254	77.9	Jamil Hijazi	NCP	67,299	22.1	169,955	55.8
211	Dhaka	Faridpur-1	Md. Elias Molla	JeI	154,145	54.9	Khandokar Nasirul Islam	BNP	126,476	45.1	27,669	9.9
212	Dhaka	Faridpur-2	Shama Obaed	BNP	121,694	57.7	Md. Akram Ali	BKM	89,305	42.3	32,389	15.4
213	Dhaka	Faridpur-3	Nayab Yusuf Ahmed	BNP	148,545	54.5	Md. Abdul Tawab	JeI	124,115	45.5	24,430	9.0
214	Dhaka	Faridpur-4	Md. Shahidul Islam	BNP	127,443	62.7	Md. Sarwar Hossain	JeI	75,805	37.3	51,638	25.4
215	Dhaka	Gopalganj-1	Md. Selimuzzaman Molya	BNP	69,462	56.1	Md. Kabir Miya	GOP	54,329	43.9	15,133	12.2
216	Dhaka	Gopalganj-2	KM Babar	BNP	40,048	54.8	M. H. Khan Manju	IND	33,039	45.2	7,009	9.6
217	Dhaka	Gopalganj-3	S. M. Jilani	BNP	60,166	64.0	Gobinda Chandra Pramanik	IND	33,867	36.0	26,299	28.0
218	Dhaka	Madaripur-1	Syed Uddin Ahmad Hanzala	BKM	64,909	50.1	Nadira Akhter	BNP	64,524	49.9	385	0.3
219	Dhaka	Madaripur-2	Md. Jahandar Ali Mia	BNP	61,744	57.1	Milton Baiddo	IND	46,476	42.9	15,268	14.1
220	Dhaka	Madaripur-3	Anishur Rahman	BNP	96,188	53.2	Md. Rafiqul Islam	JeI	84,646	46.8	11,542	6.4
221	Dhaka	Shariatpur-1	Sayeed Ahmed Aslam	BNP	77,398	55.2	Jalaluddin Ahmad	BKM	62,717	44.8	14,681	10.5
222	Dhaka	Shariatpur-2	Md. Safiqur Rahman Kiran	BNP	129,814	64.7	Mahmud Hossain	JeI	70,892	35.3	58,922	29.4
223	Dhaka	Shariatpur-3	Mia Nuruddin Ahmed Apu	BNP	107,516	60.7	Muhammad Azharul Islam	JeI	69,684	39.3	37,832	21.4
224	Sylhet	Sunamganj-1	Kamruzzaman Kamrul	BNP	161,774	63.5	Tofail Ahmed	JeI	92,966	36.5	68,808	27.0
225	Sylhet	Sunamganj-2	Md. Nasir Chowdhury	BNP	99,522	61.2	Mohammad Shishir Monir	JeI	63,220	38.8	36,302	22.3
226	Sylhet	Sunamganj-3	Mohammad Kaisar Ahmed	BNP	97,313	69.7	Md. Anwar Hossain	IND	42,226	30.3	55,087	39.4
227	Sylhet	Sunamganj-4	Nurul Islam	BNP	98,092	56.4	Md. Shams Uddin	JeI	75,735	43.6	22,357	12.9
228	Sylhet	Sunamganj-5	Kalim Uddin Ahmed	BNP	151,915	59.8	Abu Tahir Muhammad Abdus Salam	JeI	102,121	40.2	49,794	19.6
229	Sylhet	Sylhet-1	Khandakar Abdul Muktadir	BNP	176,936	56.7	Maulana Habibur Rahman	JeI	134,983	43.3	41,953	13.4
230	Sylhet	Sylhet-2	Tahsina Rushdir Luna	BNP	116,697	75.7	Muhammad Muntasir Ali	BKM	37,446	24.3	79,251	51.4
231	Sylhet	Sylhet-3	Mohammad Abdul Malik	BNP	114,255	60.8	Musleh Uddin Raju	BKM	73,614	39.2	40,641	21.6
232	Sylhet	Sylhet-4	Ariful Haque Chowdhury	BNP	186,846	72.3	Md Zainal Abedin	JeI	71,391	27.7	115,455	44.7
233	Sylhet	Sylhet-5	Mohammad Abul Hasan	KM	79,355	53.2	Ubaidullah Faruk	JUIB	69,774	46.8	9,581	6.4
234	Sylhet	Sylhet-6	Emran Ahmed Chowdhury	BNP	70,794	55.9	Mohammad Selim Uddin	JeI	55,923	44.1	14,871	11.8
235	Sylhet	Moulvibazar-1	Nasir Uddin Ahmed	BNP	98,282	54.2	Mohammad Aminul Islam	JeI	83,013	45.8	15,269	8.4
236	Sylhet	Moulvibazar-2	Shawkat Hossain Saku	BNP	88,381	62.3	Md. Syed Ali	JeI	53,458	37.7	34,923	24.6
237	Sylhet	Moulvibazar-3	Nasser Rahman	BNP	156,757	66.9	Md. Abdul Mannan	JeI	77,636	33.1	79,121	33.8
238	Sylhet	Moulvibazar-4	Md. Mujibur Rahman Chowdhury	BNP	170,877	77.3	Sheikh Noor-e-Alam Hamidi	BKM	50,204	22.7	120,673	54.6
239	Sylhet	Habiganj-1	Reza Kibria	BNP	111,999	66.6	Maulana Sirajul Islam	BKM	56,132	33.4	55,867	33.2
240	Sylhet	Habiganj-2	Abu Mansoor Sakhawat Hasan	BNP	126,583	65.8	Abdul Basit Azad	BKM	65,762	34.2	60,821	31.6
241	Sylhet	Habiganj-3	G. K. Gouse	BNP	142,348	75.7	Qazi Mohsin Ahmad	JeI	45,568	24.3	96,780	51.5
242	Sylhet	Habiganj-4	S. M. Faisal	BNP	188,072	69.1	Md Ghiyas Uddin	BIF	84,323	30.9	103,749	38.2
243	Chittagong	Brahmanbaria-1	M. A. Hannan	BNP	68,092	65.9	A. K. M. Aminul Islam	JeI	35,220	34.1	32,872	31.8
244	Chittagong	Brahmanbaria-2	Rumeen Farhana	IND	118,547	59.6	Mohammad Junaid Al Habib	JUIB	80,434	40.4	38,113	19.2
245	Chittagong	Brahmanbaria-3	Md. Khaled Hossain Mahbub	BNP	209,636	77.0	Md. Ataullah	NCP	62,547	23.0	147,089	54.0
246	Chittagong	Brahmanbaria-4	Mushfiqur Rahman	BNP	139,842	60.4	Md. Ataur Rahman Sarkar	JeI	91,796	39.6	48,046	20.8
247	Chittagong	Brahmanbaria-5	Md. Abdul Mannan	BNP	85,769	50.3	Kazi Nazmul Hossain	IND	84,708	49.7	1,061	0.6
248	Chittagong	Brahmanbaria-6	Zonayed Saki	GSA	95,342	70.5	Md. Mohsin	JeI	39,976	29.5	55,366	41.0
249	Chittagong	Comilla-1	Khandkar Mosharraf Hossain	BNP	141,440	59.9	Md. Moniruzzaman	JeI	94,845	40.1	46,595	19.7
250	Chittagong	Comilla-2	Md. Abdul Mannan	BNP	77,037	55.0	Md. Abdul Matin	IND	63,045	45.0	13,992	10.0
251	Chittagong	Comilla-3	Kazi Shah Mofazzal Hossain Kaikobad	BNP	159,291	59.2	Md. Yusuf Sohail	JeI	109,599	40.8	49,692	18.5
252	Chittagong	Comilla-4	Hasnat Abdullah	NCP	166,583	77.0	Md. Jasim Uddin	GOP	49,885	23.0	116,698	54.0
253	Chittagong	Comilla-5	Md. Jashim Uddin	BNP	134,485	51.9	Mubarak Hossain	JeI	124,587	48.1	9,898	3.8
254	Chittagong	Comilla-6	Monirul Haq Chowdhury	BNP	201,706	62.7	Qazi Deen Mohammad	JeI	119,851	37.3	81,855	25.4
255	Chittagong	Comilla-7	Atikul Alam Shawon	IND	91,690	65.4	Redwan Ahmed	BNP	48,509	34.6	43,181	30.8
256	Chittagong	Comilla-8	Zakaria Taher Sumon	BNP	169,178	79.0	Md. Shafiqul Alam Helal	JeI	45,091	21.0	124,087	57.9
257	Chittagong	Comilla-9	Md. Abul Kalam	BNP	170,008	58.8	AKM Sarwar Uddin Siddiqui	JeI	118,961	41.2	51,047	17.6
258	Chittagong	Comilla-10	Md. Mobaswer Alam Bhuiyan	BNP	163,667	56.9	Mohammad Ibrahim Abrar	JeI	123,733	43.1	39,934	13.9
259	Chittagong	Comilla-11	Syed Abdullah Muhammad Taher	JeI	133,308	63.5	Md. Kamrul Huda	BNP	76,638	36.5	56,670	27.0
260	Chittagong	Chandpur-1	A. N. M. Ehsanul Hoque Milan	BNP	133,032	65.4	Abu Nashar Maqbool Ahmad	JeI	70,368	34.6	62,664	30.8
261	Chittagong	Chandpur-2	Md. Jalal Uddin	BNP	172,506	75.0	Md. Bilal Hossain	LDP	57,473	25.0	115,033	50.0
262	Chittagong	Chandpur-3	Sheikh Farid Ahmed	BNP	165,404	62.1	Md. Shahjahan Mia	JeI	100,865	37.9	64,539	24.2
263	Chittagong	Chandpur-4	Md. Abdul Hannan	IND	74,175	51.8	Md. Harunur Rashid	BNP	69,155	48.2	5,020	3.5
264	Chittagong	Chandpur-5	Md. Mominul Haque	BNP	185,404	71.0	Md. Neyamul Bashir	LDP	75,660	29.0	109,744	42.0
265	Chittagong	Feni-1	Rafiqul Alam Majnu	BNP	119,904	58.3	SM Kamaluddin	JeI	85,615	41.7	34,289	16.7
266	Chittagong	Feni-2	Joynal Abedin	BNP	131,210	62.1	Mojibur Rahman Bhuiyan Monju	ABP	80,058	37.9	51,152	24.2
267	Chittagong	Feni-3	Abdul Awal Mintoo	BNP	157,425	59.3	Mohammad Fakhruddin	JeI	108,160	40.7	49,265	18.6
268	Chittagong	Noakhali-1	Mahbub Uddin Khokon	BNP	126,833	56.4	Md. Saif Ullah	JeI	98,036	43.6	28,797	12.8
269	Chittagong	Noakhali-2	Zainul Abdin Farroque	BNP	83,982	55.6	Sultan Muhammad Zakaria Majumdar	NCP	67,054	44.4	16,928	11.2
270	Chittagong	Noakhali-3	Barkat Ullah Bulu	BNP	141,031	53.2	Md. Borhan Uddin	JeI	123,941	46.8	17,090	6.4
271	Chittagong	Noakhali-4	Md. Shahjahan	BNP	219,182	59.5	Md. Ishaq Khandkar	JeI	148,989	40.5	70,193	19.1
272	Chittagong	Noakhali-5	Mohammad Fakhrul Islam	BNP	147,808	55.1	Mohammad Belayet Hossain	JeI	120,453	44.9	27,355	10.2
273	Chittagong	Noakhali-6	Abdul Hannan Masud	NCP	91,899	58.9	Mohammad Mahbuber Rahman	BNP	64,021	41.1	27,878	17.9
274	Chittagong	Lakshmipur-1	Md. Shahadat Hossain	BNP	86,811	59.4	Md. Mahbub Alam	NCP	59,265	40.6	27,546	18.8
275	Chittagong	Lakshmipur-2	Md. Abul Khair Bhuiyan	BNP	146,321	52.2	S. U. M. Ruhul Amin Bhuiyan	JeI	133,698	47.8	12,623	4.5
276	Chittagong	Lakshmipur-3	Shahid Uddin Chowdhury Anee	BNP	135,612	52.5	Md. Rezaul Karim	JeI	122,802	47.5	12,810	5.0
277	Chittagong	Lakshmipur-4	A. B. M. Ashraf Uddin Nijan	BNP	115,199	61.0	Md. Ashraful Rahman Hafizulya	JeI	73,756	39.0	41,443	22.0
278	Chittagong	Chittagong-1	Nurul Amin	BNP	128,799	58.19	Mohammad Shaifur Rahman	JeI	84,538	37.03	44,261	21.15
279	Chittagong	Chittagong-2	Sarwar Alamgir	BNP	138,545		Mohammad Nurul Amin	JeI				
280	Chittagong	Chittagong-3	Mostafa Kamal Pasha	BNP	73,037	60.39	Mohammad Alauddin Sikder	JeI	39,662	32.79	33,375	27.59
281	Chittagong	Chittagong-4	Result withhold by Supreme Court.									
282	Chittagong	Chittagong-5	Mir Mohammad Helal Uddin	BNP	147,054	68.78	Md. Nasir Uddin	BKM	46,589	21.80	100,465	47.02
283	Chittagong	Chittagong-6	Giasuddin Quader Chowdhury	BNP	111,201	67.76	Mohammad Ilias Nuri	BIF	26,696	16.27	84,505	51.49
284	Chittagong	Chittagong-7	Humam Quader Chowdhury	BNP	101,445	57.85	ATM Rezaul Karim	JeI	41,719	23.79	59,726	34.06
285	Chittagong	Chittagong-8	Ershad Ullah	BNP	152,969	57.85	Md. Abu Nasser	JeI	53,564	20.14	99,405	37.71
286	Chittagong	Chittagong-9	Mohammad Abu Sufian	BNP	109,388	66.37	Dr. AKM Fazlul Haque	JeI	53,807	32.64	55,581	33.73
287	Chittagong	Chittagong-10	Sayeed Al Noman	BNP	122,978	57.4	Muhammad Shamsuzzaman Helaly	JeI	76,919	35.9	46,059	21.5
288	Chittagong	Chittagong-11	Amir Khasru Mahmud Chowdhury	BNP	115,999	56.83	Mohammad Shafiul Alam	JeI	76,681	36.44	39,318	20.39
289	Chittagong	Chittagong-12	Enamul Haque Enam	BNP	135,044	70.55	Syed Air Mohammad Payaru	BIF	28,999	15.15	106,045	55.40
290	Chittagong	Chittagong-13	Sarwar Jamal Nizam	BNP	126,192	57.66	S. M. Shah Jahan	BIF	51,450	23.51	74,742	34.15
291	Chittagong	Chittagong-14	Jashim Uddin Ahammed	BNP	76,493	41.93	Omar Farooq	LDP	75,467	41.36	1,026	0.56
292	Chittagong	Chittagong-15	Shajahan Chowdhury	JeI	172,061	57.6	Nazmul Mustafa Amin	BNP	127,025	41.5	50,577	16.1
293	Chittagong	Chittagong-16	Mohammad Zahirul Islam	JeI	93,167	39.51	Miskatul Islam Chowdhury	BNP	83,105	35.24	10,062	4.27
294	Chittagong	Cox's Bazar-1	Salahuddin Ahmed	BNP	222,019	63.12	Abdullah Al Farooq	JeI	129,728	36.88	92,291	26.24
295	Chittagong	Cox's Bazar-2	Alamgir Mahfuzullah Farid	BNP	125,543	57.80	A. H. M. Hamidur Rahman Azad	JeI	91,889	41.36	33,654	16.44
296	Chittagong	Cox's Bazar-3	Lutfur Rahman Kajal	BNP	182,096	52.31	Shahidul Alam	JeI	161,827	46.49	20,269	5.82
297	Chittagong	Cox's Bazar-4	Shahjahan Chowdhury	BNP	122,909	50.31	Noor Ahmad Anwari	JeI	121,980	49.69	929	0.63
298	Chittagong	Khagrachhari	Wadud Bhuiyan	BNP	151,040	45.67	Dharma Jyoti Chakma	IND	68,315	20.66	82,725	25.02
299	Chittagong	Rangamati	Dipen Dewan	BNP	201,544	76.45	Pahel Chakma	IND	31,222	11.85	170,322	64.60
300	Chittagong	Bandarban	Saching Prue Jerry	BNP	141,455	80.94	Abu Saeed Md. Suja Uddin	NCP	26,162	14.97	115,293	65.96

== Reactions ==
=== Domestic ===
Following the unofficial results, BNP urged its supporters to not hold any victory rally or meeting, but instead to pray at mosques at noon nationwide. Both Jamaat and NCP alleged inconsistencies and raised accusations of "election engineering". Jamaat urged its supporters to wait for the official results and future programmes. The party later requested the Election Commission to recount votes in 32 constituencies. The 11 parties organized nationwide demonstrations on 16 February protesting alleged "election engineering" and violence against their supporters following the election. Additionally, the coalition declared to form a "shadow cabinet" against the government cabinet. If it is formed, it will be the first such type of arrangement in Bangladesh.

=== International ===
Malaysian prime minister Anwar Ibrahim, Indian prime minister Narendra Modi, Pakistani president Asif Ali Zardari and prime minister Shehbaz Sharif, Sri Lankan president Anura Kumara Dissanayake, Nepalese prime minister Sushila Karki, Maldivian president Mohamed Muizzu, and Bhutanese prime minister Tshering Tobgay congratulated Rahman on his victory. Modi also spoke with Rahman via telephone. Indian state, West Bengal chief minister Mamata Banerjee and Indian National Congress president Mallikarjun Kharge also congratulated Rahman.

== Violence ==
=== Pre-election ===
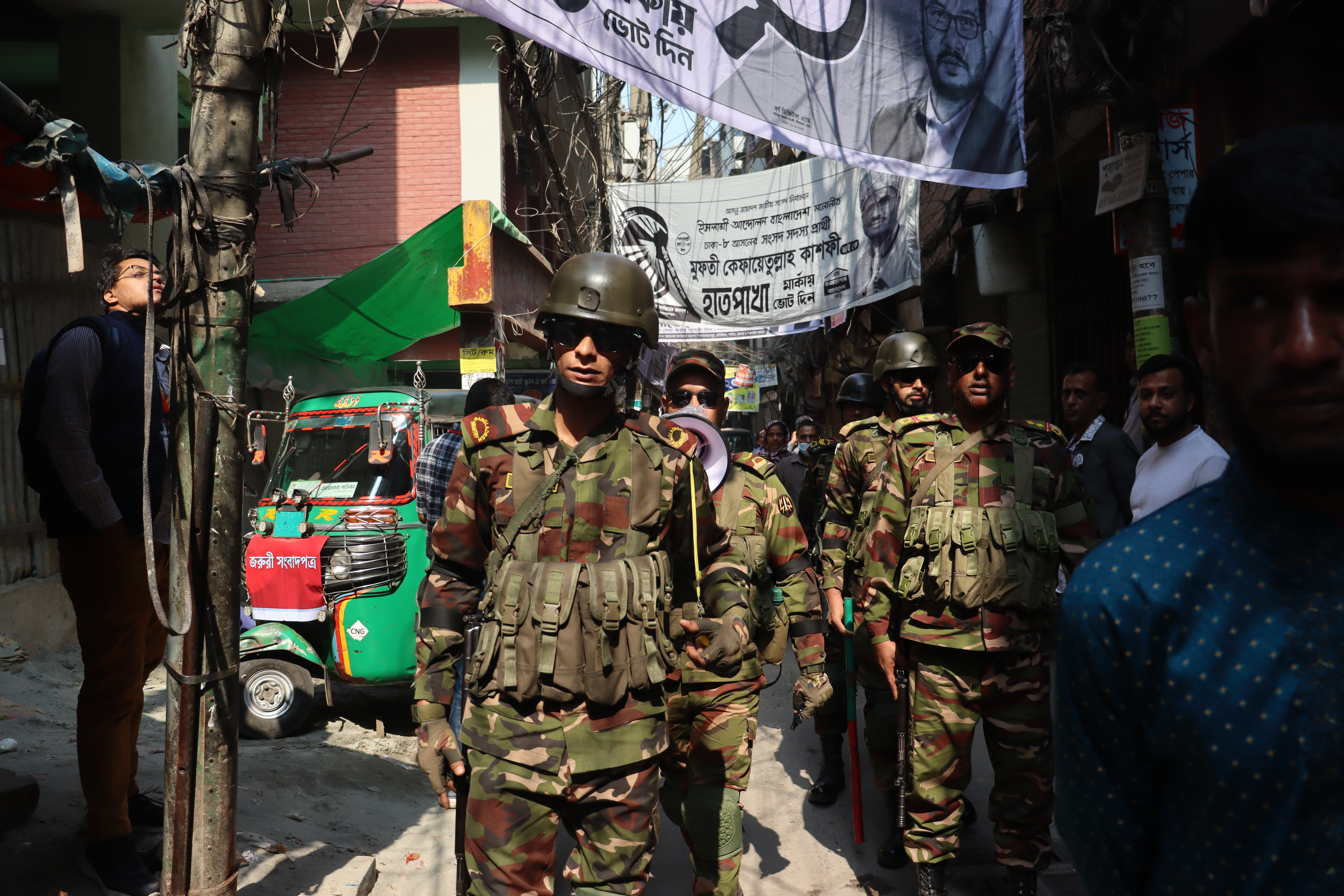
The military was deployed in selected areas, alongside other security forces, to maintain law and order during the election.

By the end of January 2026, the Human Rights Support Society (HRSS) reported at least 62 election-related clashes nationwide since the election schedule was announced. In the same period, since 11 December, at least 16 political activists were killed, raising concerns over renewed political violence. While none of the deaths have officially been classified as politically motivated, local media and rights groups report that BNP leaders and activists account for 13 of the fatalities. Additionally, at least 24 people were shot and more than 200 residences and establishments were attacked during this period. HRSS also stated that at least 10 people were killed and 2,503 injured between October 2025 and 14 February 2026. On polling day, there were 105 clashes, 59 allegations of ballot stuffing, six assaults on candidates, three incidents of ballot box snatching, and two cases of arson

According to Transparency International Bangladesh (TIB), BNP was involved with 91.7%, Awami League with 20.7%, Jamaat-e-Islami with 7.7%, and the National Citizen Party (NCP) with 1.2% of the political violence committed since 5 August 2024. Explosives were found being made to sabotage elections in incidents reported in January and December.

On 12 December 2025, Osman Hadi, leader of Inqilab Moncho and an independent candidate for the Dhaka-8 constituency, was shot by Awami League-backed assailants riding motorcycles while conducting an election campaign in the Paltan area of Dhaka. He was later taken to the hospital in critical condition, where he fell into a coma. He died on 18 December while undergoing treatment in Singapore General Hospital.

Previously, Michael Kugelman, senior fellow with the Asia Pacific Foundation of Canada, expressed concerns of violent actions from the Awami League in reaction to the verdict of the trial of Sheikh Hasina ahead of the general election. Kugelman's concerns were elaborated on by geopolitical analyst Bahauddin Foizee, who noted in The Diplomat that multiple layers of conflict were likely, including between the government and the Awami League, and between the Awami League and other political parties. Foizee pointed out that the BNP and Jamaat-e-Islami, both historically united in opposition to Hasina, are now vying for dominance in the post-Hasina political landscape, which could lead to violent confrontations between the two. He also highlighted the danger of intra-party conflicts within the BNP and Jamaat, noting that such internal struggles, long embedded in Bangladesh's political culture, could spill over into public unrest, further deepening instability.

=== Post-election ===
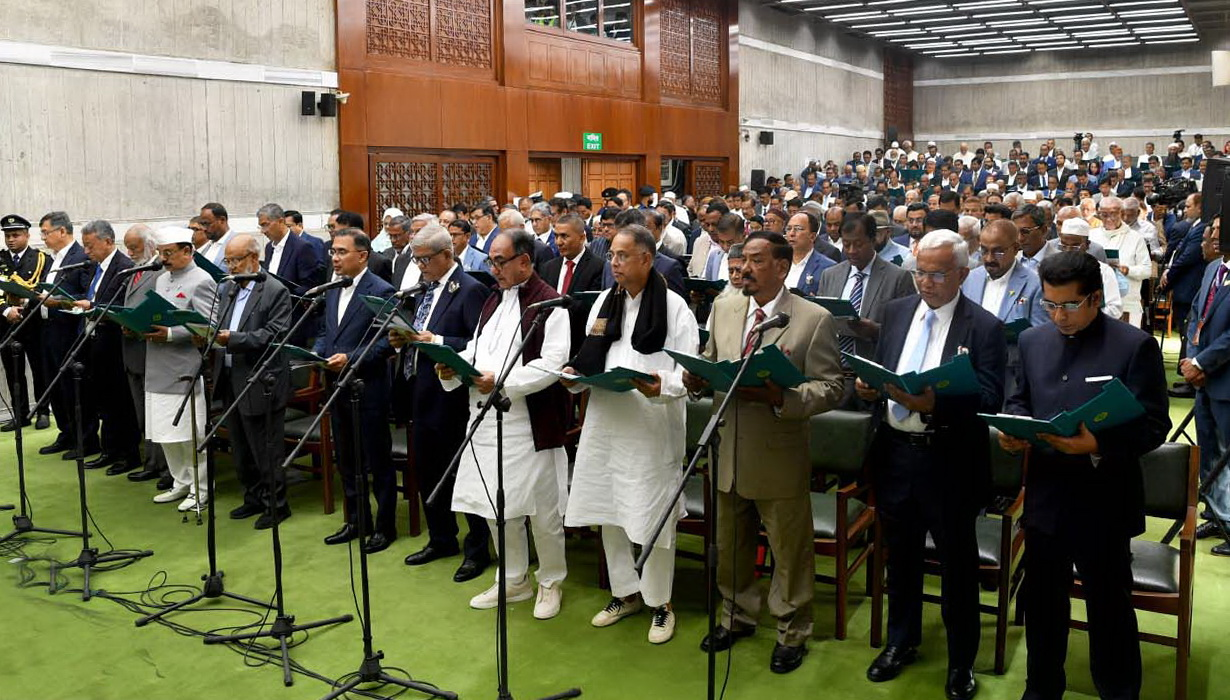
Newly elected Members of Parliament of the Bangladesh Nationalist Party taking oath at the Jatiya Sangsad on 17 February 2026

Following the results, Jamaat accused BNP supporters of attacking supporters of the 11 Parties, their homes and businesses in 21 places in 16 districts nationwide. Prothom Alo found evidence of attacks on most places, though some claims were found to have been false, and even local activists reportedly did not have any idea of such attacks.

== Misinformation ==
A report by Dismiss Lab found that between 16 December 2025 and 15 January 2026, election-related misinformation grew 41% than previous month. Key topics of misinformation include alliance, seat convenience and opinion polls. The Election Commission reportedly detected around 86,000 pieces of artificial intelligence generated disinformation ahead of the election, nearly 36,000 of them were identified as violent in nature, primarily targeting the top party leader like Tarique Rahman and Shafiqur Rahman. According to a report by the Rumor Scanner Bangladesh, Tarique was targeted by rumours in 133 instances while the BNP was affected by 360 rumours. Shafiqur was subject to 54 negative rumors and his party Jamaat-e-Islami was affected by 308 negative rumors.

A BBC Bangla report found that artificial intelligence generated misinformation could impact the general election. Started by the Jamaat-e-Islami supporters, it quickly spread among the BNP and the NCP supporters, which shows fake campaign and voter base of the respective party. According to Dhaka University professor Saiful Alam Chowdhury, such "information disorder" risks post-election riots like Brazil attacks in Bangladesh.

Reports from several fact-checking organizations found that deepfake and cheapfake contents were prevailing before the elections. Fact-checkers, analysts, and law-enforcing officials identified various techniques of spreading misinformation through these media, which include adding misleading captions, cutting out parts of original statements or changing the context to create different meanings, using fabricated statements in the name of a person, and presenting old information as recent events. Some identified people behind these works include some "detected" foreign individuals, Awami League supporters, and Internet "bot armies", which work on behalf of various political parties. The US-based Center for the Study of Organized Hate claimed that between August 2025 and February 2026, more than 700,000 posts of the AI generated contents were published from 17,000 X accounts from "coordinated" Hindu nationalist networks across India, US, UK and Canada, which highlights a "Hindu genocide" ahead of the election.

== In popular culture ==
According to BBC Bangla, more than 250 theme songs were produced before the elections for various parties and candidates, through which studios and artists earned millions of taka. Dhaka 26 is an election-themed romantic drama based on the general election, produced by Esha Rahman, directed by Ishteaque Ahmed, and starring Akash Rahman, Allen Shubhro and Tasnuva Tisha.

== See also ==
- 2026 Bangladeshi presidential election
- 2026 national electoral calendar
- Elections in Bangladesh
- Bangladesh Election Commission
