= List of people from Kurigram District =

This list of notable people from Kurigram District includes individuals who were born in, resided in, or have ancestral roots in the Kurigram District of Bangladesh.

== Freedom Fighters ==
=== Revolutionaries ===
- Raufun Basunia, student leader in the anti-autocracy movement.

=== Bir Muktijoddha (Gallant Freedom Fighters) ===
- Taramon Bibi, recipient of the title Bir Pratik.

== Writers ==
- Syed Shamsul Haq, renowned for his work across all branches of literature including poetry, drama, novels, and short stories; known as the "Sabyasachi Lekhak (versatile writer)".

== Entertainment ==
=== Lyricists, Composers, and Vocalists ===
- Abbasuddin Ahmed, vocalist, music director, and composer.
- Ajit Roy, singer, composer, and key organizer of the Swadhin Bangla Betar Kendra.

== Politicians ==
- Shamsul Haque Chowdhury, freedom fighter, politician.
- Amzad Hossain Sarkar (1958–2021), 8th Jatiya Sangsad member.
- Aslam Hossain Saudagar (1966–), 11th Jatiya Sangsad member.
- M. A. Matin (Kurigram politician), 11th Jatiya Sangsad member.
- A. K. M. Maidul Islam (1943–2018), politician, industrialist, former minister and MP of Kurigram-3, founder and chairman of Qasem Group.
- Golam Habib Dulal (1943–), politician, former Chief Conservator of Forests, former MP of Kurigram-4, and former chairman of Bangladesh Satota Party (2017–2018) and chairman of Bangladesh Sattobadi Dal.
- Tajul Islam Chowdhury (1944–2018), politician, former minister, MP of Kurigram-2, and former whip and chief whip of the National Parliament.
- Abdul Bari Sarkar, 6th Jatiya Sangsad member.
- Mohammad Sadakat Hossain, 1st Jatiya Sangsad member.
- Ponir Uddin Ahmed, 11th Jatiya Sangsad member.
- Mohammad Sirajul Haque, 2nd Jatiya Sangsad member.
- Ruhul Kabir Rizvi, Senior Joint Secretary General of the Bangladesh Nationalist Party.
- Zakir Hossain (1966–), MP of Kurigram-4 and minister.
- Saifur Rahman Rana, 6th Jatiya Sangsad member.
- Ruhul Amin, 10th Jatiya Sangsad member.

== Social Workers ==
- Rikta Akter Banu, selected among the world's 100 most inspiring and influential women according to the BBC 100 Women list.

== Judiciary ==
- A B M Altaf Hossain, former Deputy Attorney General and Justice.

== Government Officials ==
- Ashraf-ud-Doula, retired major, diplomat, secretary, and former ambassador of Bangladesh to Japan and Vietnam; also served as High Commissioner to Australia.
- Abdul Aziz Sarkar, former Director General of Rapid Action Battalion.
