= Rowmari Upazila =

Upazila in Kurigram district

Rowmari রৌমারী
- Upazila
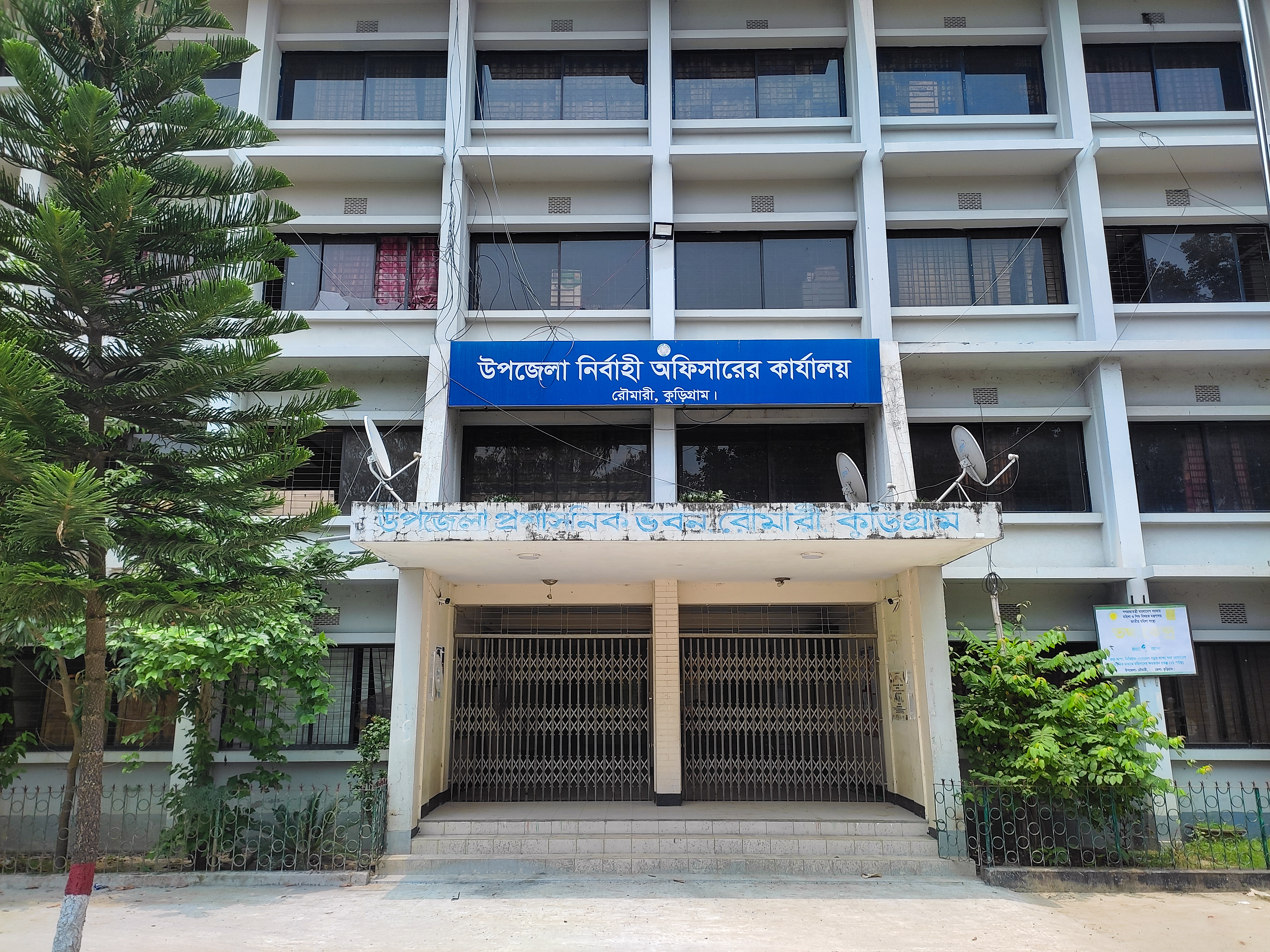
- Rowmari Upazila Executive Officer's Office

- Coordinates: 25°33.8′N 89°51′E
- Country: Bangladesh
- Division: Rangpur
- District: Kurigram

Area
  - Total: 197.03 km^{2} (76.07 sq mi)

Population (2022)
  - Total: 227,513
  - Density: 1,154.7/km^{2} (2,990.7/sq mi)
- Time zone: UTC+6 (BST)
- Postal code: 5640
- Website: rowmari.kurigram.gov.bd

Rowmari (Raumari, Bengali: রৌমারী) is an upazila of Kurigram District in the Division of Rangpur, Bangladesh.

== Geography ==
Rowmari is located at 25.5625°N 89.8500°E. It has a total area of 197.03 km^{2}.

The upazila is bounded by Ulipur Upazila and Assam state of India on the north, Char Rajibpur Upazila on the south, Assam state of India on the east, and Char Rajibpur, Chilmari, and Ulipur Upazilas on the west.

== History ==
=== Etymology ===
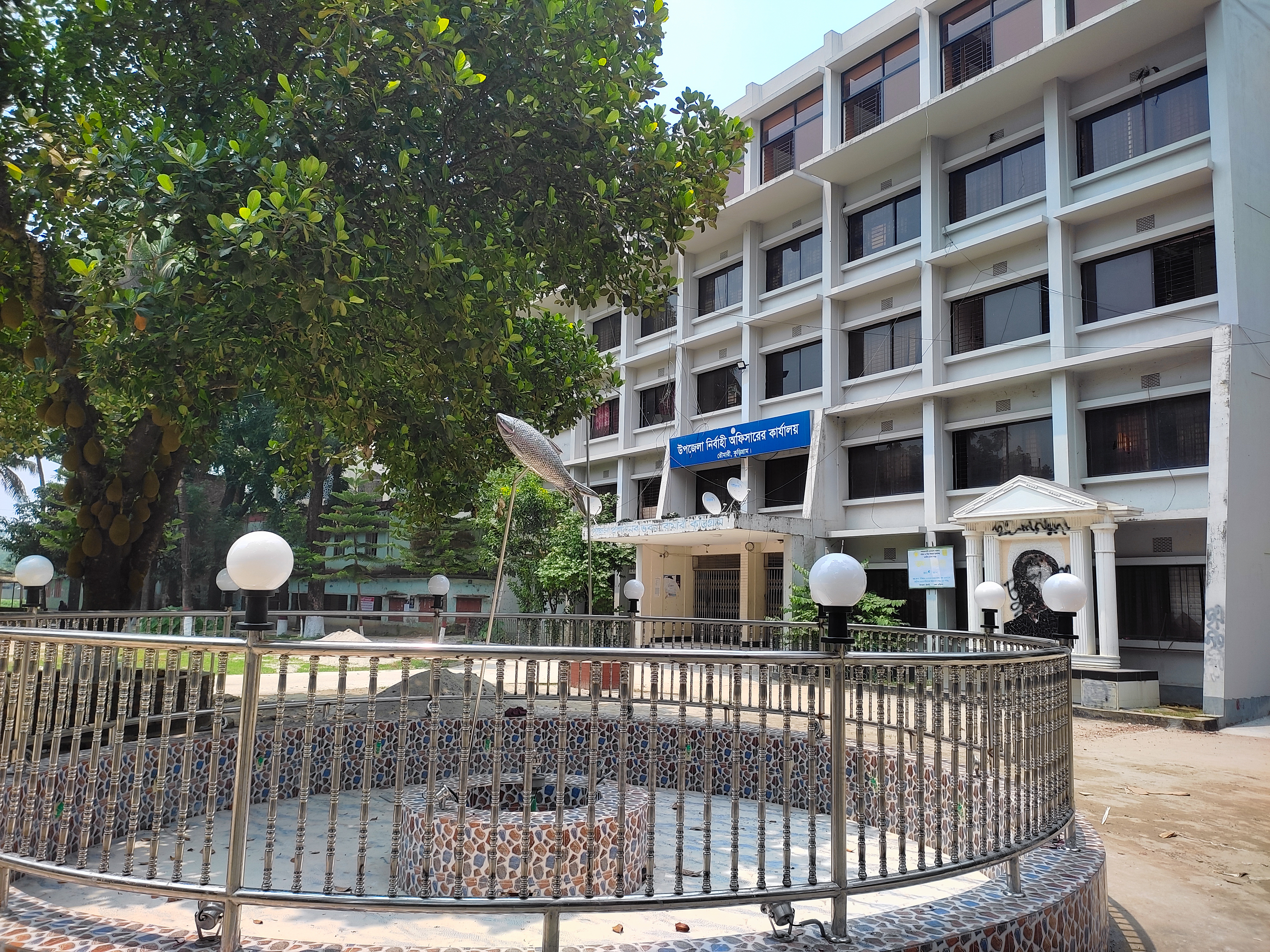
Rowmari Upazila square with the symbolic Rau (Rui) fish

The exact history behind the naming of Rowmari Upazila is not definitively known. However, according to a widely circulated folk explanation, a large quantity of Rui fish (Rohu) was once found in this region. The act of catching Rui fish here was locally referred to as Rau Mach Mara. It is believed that the name Rowmari originated from the phrase Rau Mara.

=== Background ===
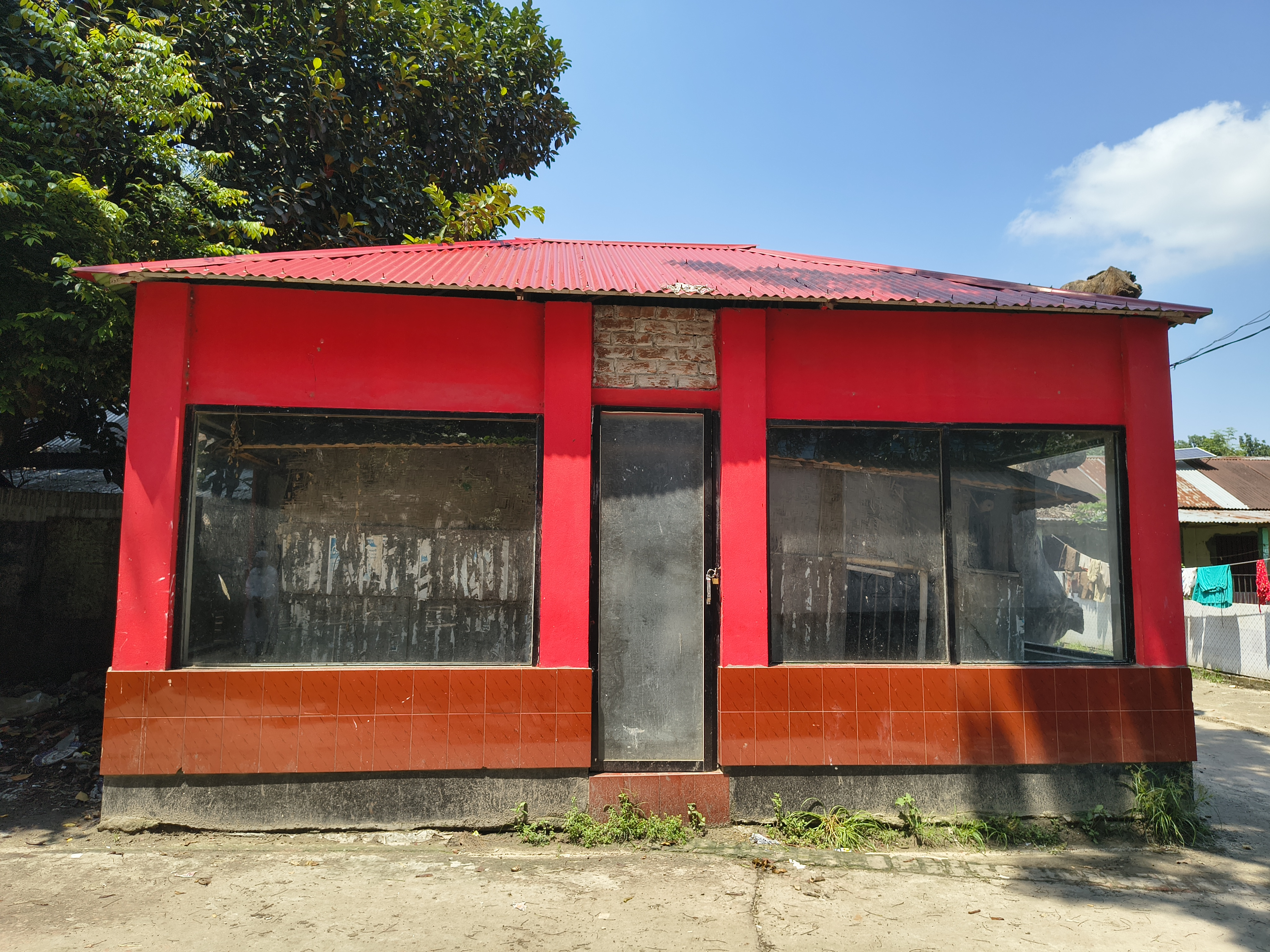
The First Post Office of Independent Bangladesh

On the eve of the Partition of India in 1947, at a place called Boraibari near the Rowmari border, Maulana Abdul Hamid Khan Bhasani and Abdul Kashem Mia of Mankachar established "Pakistan Fort" to demand the inclusion of the Muslim-majority Goalpara district of Assam into Pakistan. They organized a militia force with local youths. A massive stage was erected at this location, where Maulana Bhasani delivered speeches for seven days to a gathering of hundreds of thousands of people.

The country's first post office, located in the Bazarpara area of Rowmari Sadar Union, was established in 1947. During the Liberation War, this post office played a crucial role in the temporary administrative structure of independent Bangladesh. Due to a lack of proper maintenance and renovation, this historic establishment is now in a dilapidated condition.

=== Events of the Liberation War ===
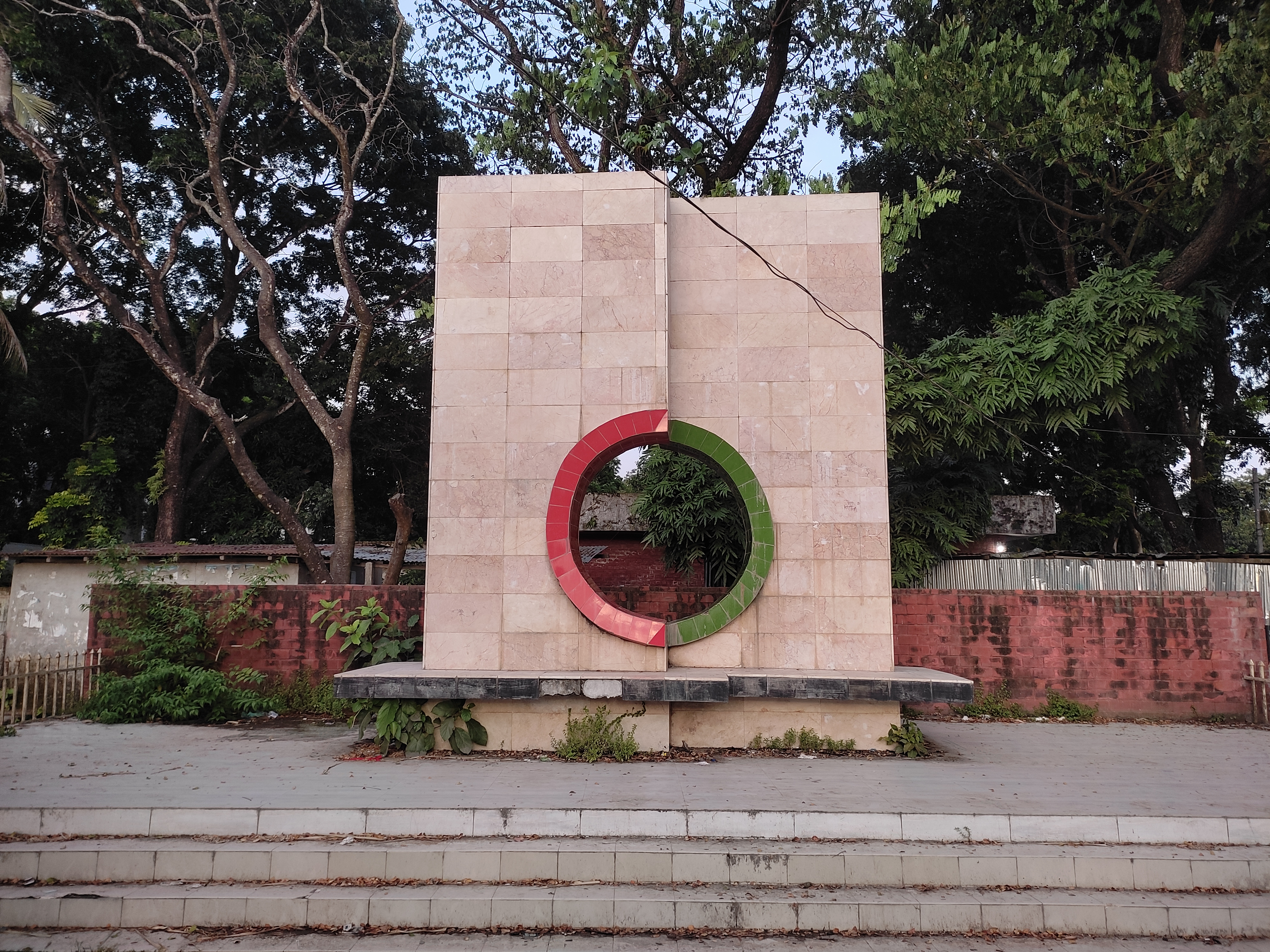
Chandmari Battlefield Liberation War Memorial

During the Bangladesh Liberation War, Sector Commander Major Ziaur Rahman, Colonel Taher, Wing Commander M. Hamidullah Khan, and others successively organized and led guerrilla warfare in Sector 11 from this area. Freedom fighters were trained here, and operations were carried out in Chilmari, Ulipur, and various areas of Gaibandha District.

During the war, nine freedom fighters from Rowmari were martyred: Abu Asad, Abul Hossain, Abdul Bari, Abdul Latif, Abdul Hamid, Abdul Majid, Shohibor Rahman, Khondokar Abdul Aziz, and Badiuzzaman. Rowmari is referred to as a "liberated zone" because the Pakistani invaders never dared to enter this region.

== Demographics ==
Religions in Raomari Upazila (2022)
Religion	Percent
Islam	99.21%
Hinduism	0.72%
Other or not stated	0.07%

According to the 2022 Bangladeshi census, Roumari Upazila had 57,569 households and a population of 227,513. 10.39% of the population were under 5 years of age. Roumari had a literacy rate (age 7 and over) of 60.52%: 62.85% for males and 58.30% for females, and a sex ratio of 95.98 males for every 100 females. 34,003 (14.95%) lived in urban areas.

According to the 2011 Census of Bangladesh, Rowmari Upazila had 46,871 households and a population of 196,417. 49,712 (25.31%) were under 10 years of age. Rowmari had a literacy rate (age 7 and over) of 34.57%, compared to the national average of 51.8%, and a sex ratio of 1051 females per 1000 males. 25,680 (13.07%) lived in urban areas.

As of the 1991 Census of Bangladesh, Rowmari has a population of 137,040. Males constitute 49.34% of the population, and females 50.66%. This upazila's eighteen-and-up population is 63,884. Raomari has an average literacy rate of 16.5% (7+ years), and the national average of 32.4% literate.

== Administration ==
Mauza geocode map of Rowmari Upazila

Rowmari Thana was established in 1908 under the Rangpur district, and on 1 August 1983, it was upgraded to an upazila. The upazila has no municipality and consists of six unions. The administrative activities of these six unions fall under the jurisdiction of Rowmari Thana.

Rowmari Upazila is divided into six union parishads:

1. Rowmari Union
2. Jadur Char Union
3. Shaulmari Union
4. Datbhanga Union
5. Bandaber Union
6. Char Shaulmari Union

== Religious institutions ==
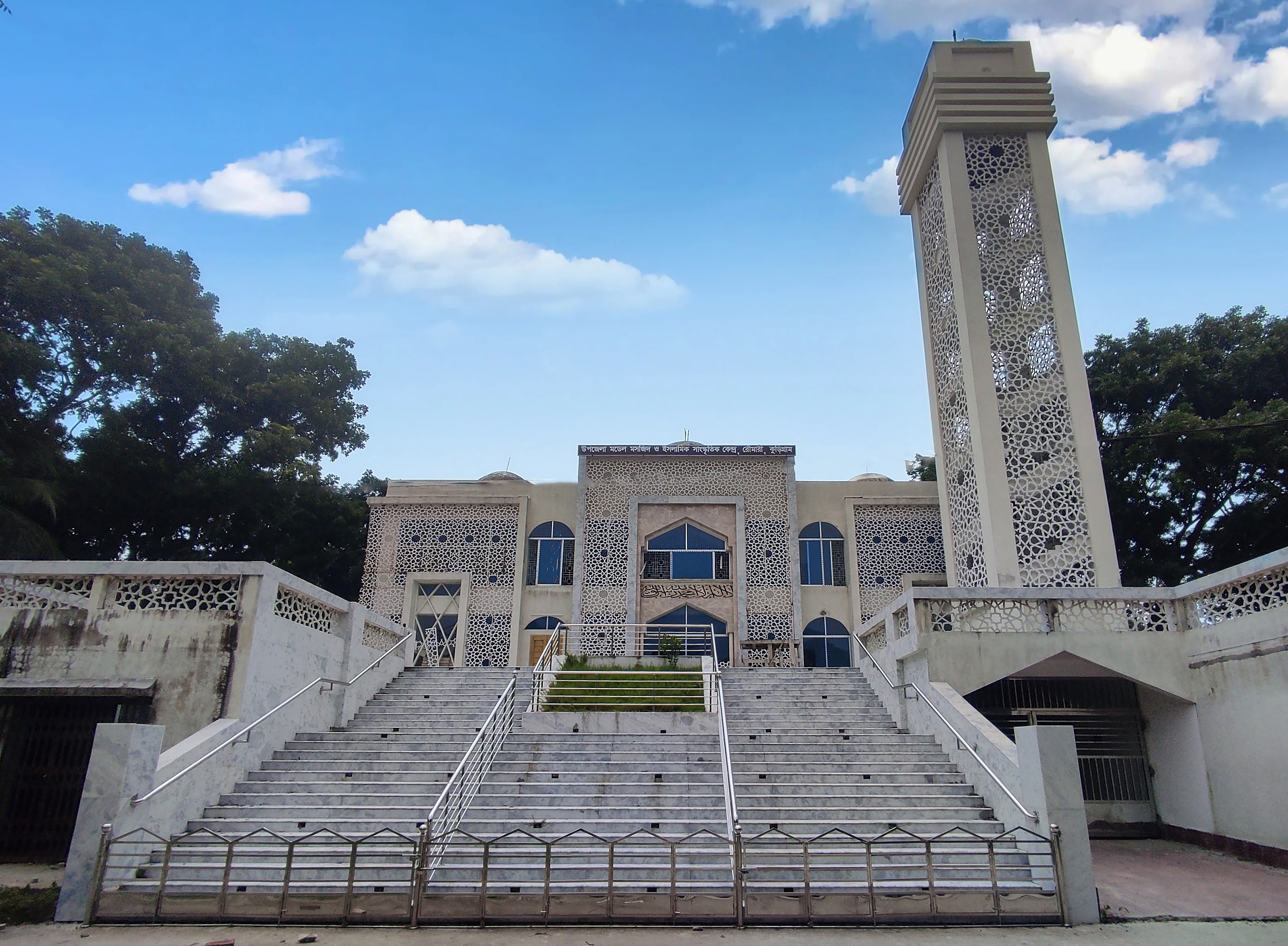
Rowmari Upazila Model Mosque and Islamic Cultural Center

There are 288 mosques and 7 temples in Rowmari Upazila.

- Rowmari Upazila Model Mosque and Islamic Cultural Center
- Thana Jame Mosque
- Beparipara Jame Mosque (established in 1882)

== Tourist attractions ==
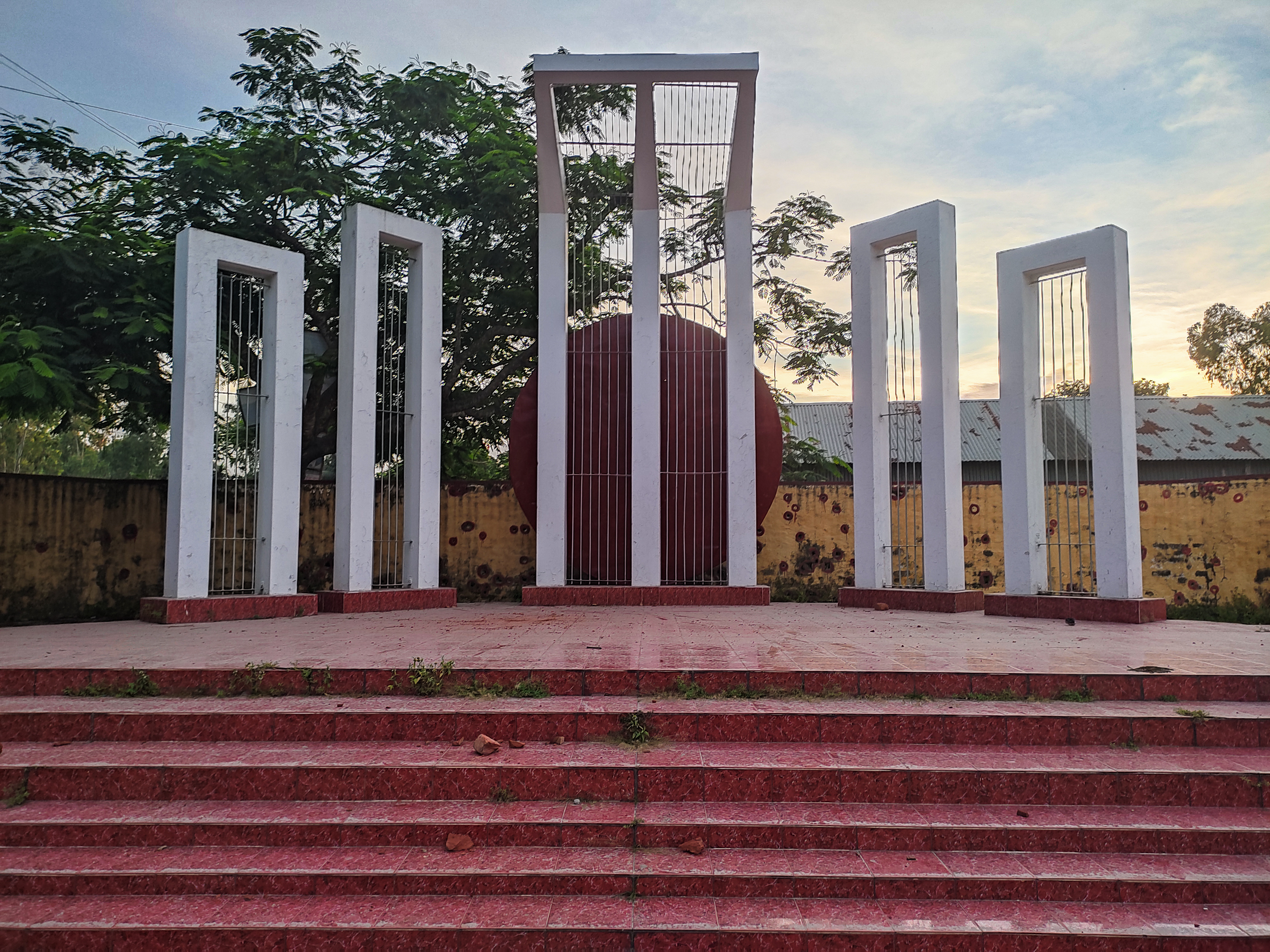
Rowmari Central Shaheed Minar

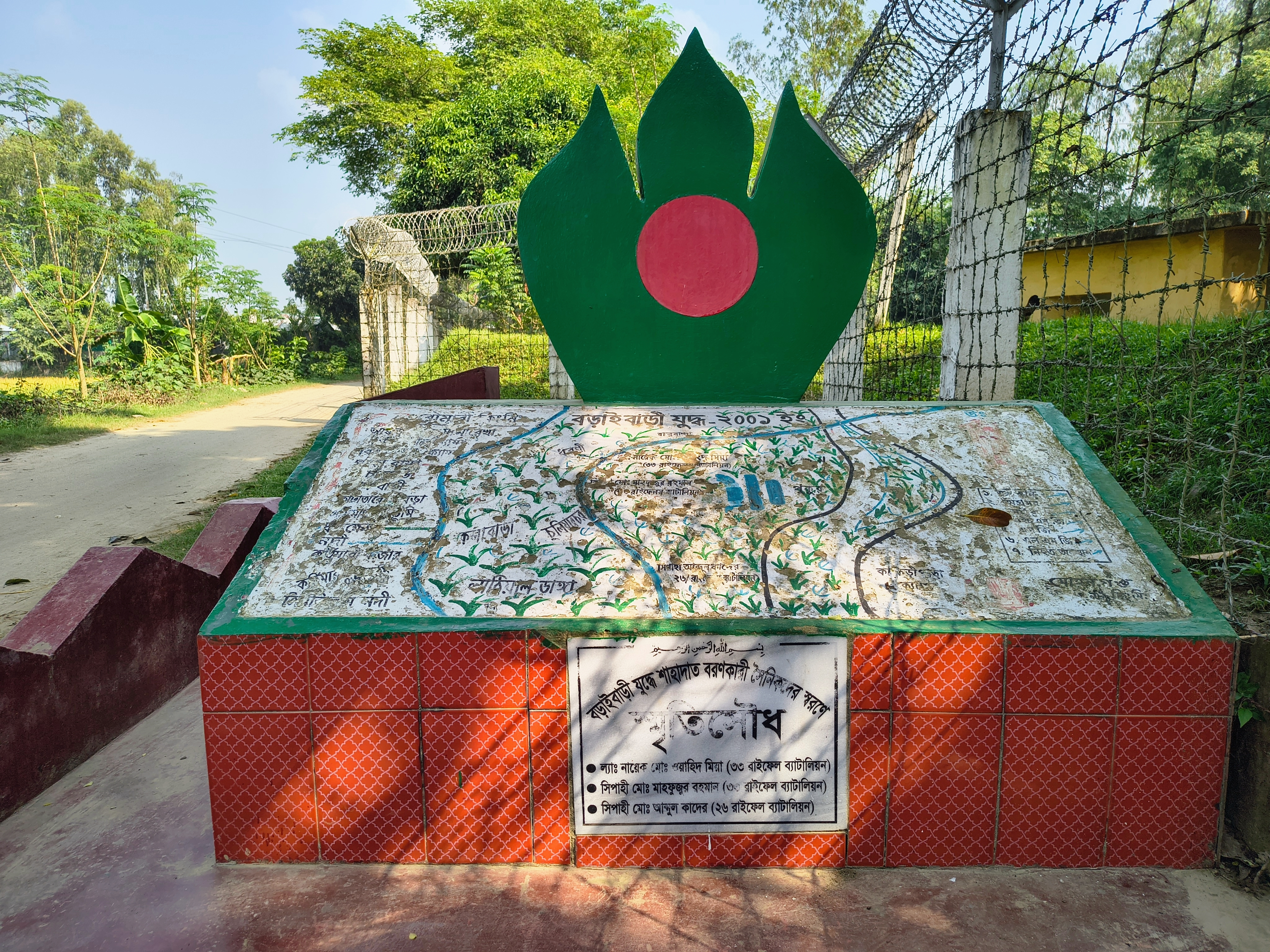
The memorial in remembrance of the Bangladeshi soldiers martyred in the Battle of Boraibari.

The notable tourist attractions in Rowmari Upazila include:

- Boraibari Memorial
- Rowmari Central Shaheed Minar

== Notable people ==
- Mohammad Sirajul Haque – principal and former member of parliament
- Golam Hossain – politician and former member of parliament
- Md Zakir Hossain – politician and former minister, Ministry of Primary and Mass Education
- Ruhul Amin – politician and former member of parliament
- Md. Biplab Hasan – politician and former member of parliament
- Md. Mostafizur Rahman Mostak – politician of Bangladesh Jaamat e Islam and current member of parliament.

== Elected representatives ==
Upazila parishad and administration

No.	Designation	Name
01	Upazila Chairman	
02	Vice Chairman	
03	Female Vice Chairman	
04	Upazila Executive Officer	

== See also ==
- Upazilas of Bangladesh
- Districts of Bangladesh
- Divisions of Bangladesh
