= Jadur Char Union =

Jadur Char Union যাদুর চর ইউনিয়ন
- Union Council
- Jadur Char Union Parishad
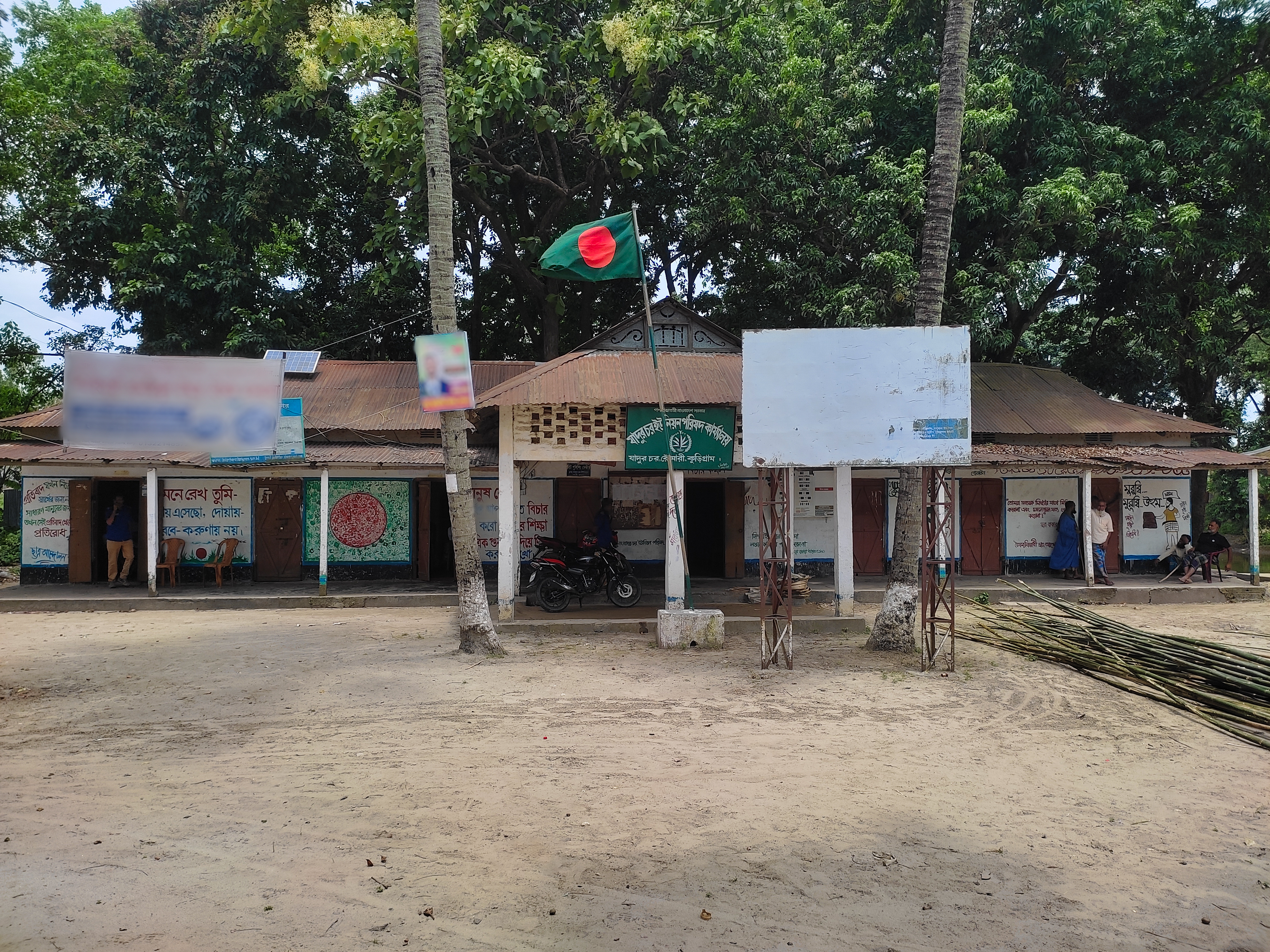
- Jadur Char Union Parishad Office

- Location in Bangladesh
- Coordinates: 25.521076°N 89.812096°E
- Country: Bangladesh
- Division: Rangpur Division
- District: Kurigram District
- Upazila: Rowmari Upazila

Government
  - Union Chairman: Md. Sarbesh Ali

Area
  - Total: 35.10 km^{2} (13.55 sq mi)

Population
  - Total: 33,394
  - Density: 951.4/km^{2} (2,464/sq mi)
- Time zone: UTC+6 (BST)
- Postal code: 5640
- Website: jadurcharup.kurigram.gov.bd/%20jadurchar.gov.bd

Jadur Char Union (Bengali: যাদুর চর ইউনিয়ন) is union of Rowmari Upazila of Kurigram District, Bangladesh.

== Geography ==
Jadur Char Union has a total area of 35.10 square kilometres (8,671 acres). To the north of Jadur Char Union lies Rowmari Upazila, to the east is India, to the south is Char Rajibpur Upazila, and to the west is the Brahmaputra River, which borders Ashtomir Char Union of Chilmari Upazila.

== Population ==
According to the 2011 census, the total population of Jadur Char Union was 33,394. The population resided in 8,111 households, with 16,166 males and 17,228 females.

== Education and Culture ==
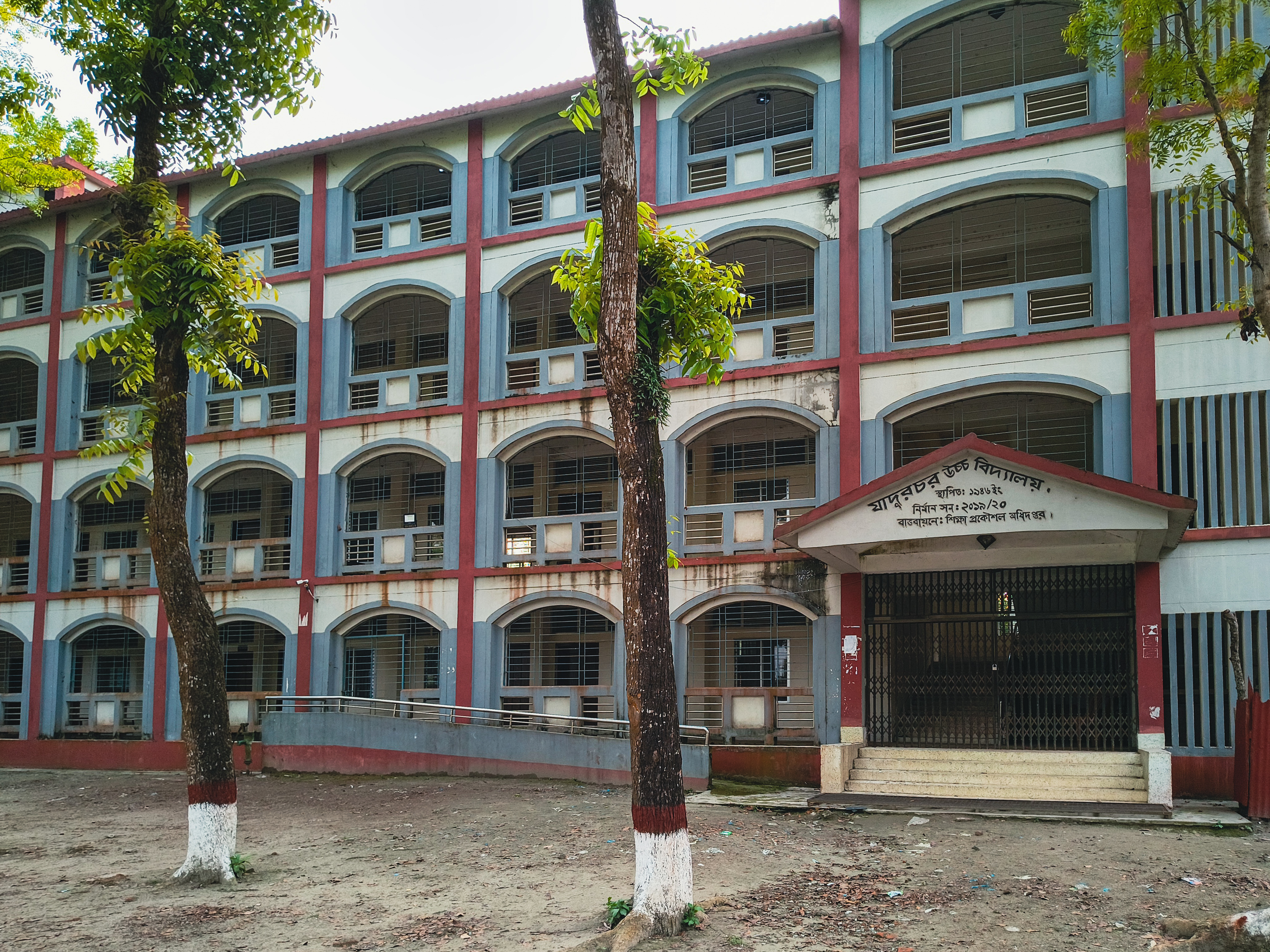
Jadur Char High School

The average literacy rate of Jadur Char Union is 33.3%, with a female literacy rate of 30.8% and a male literacy rate of 36.0%.

Notable educational institutions in this area include:

- Jadur Char Model Degree College
- Jadur Char High School
- Jadur Char Girls High School
- Jadur Char Mahius Sunnat Alim Madrasa
- Jadur Char Government Primary School
- Kashiabari Government Primary School

== Tourist Attractions ==
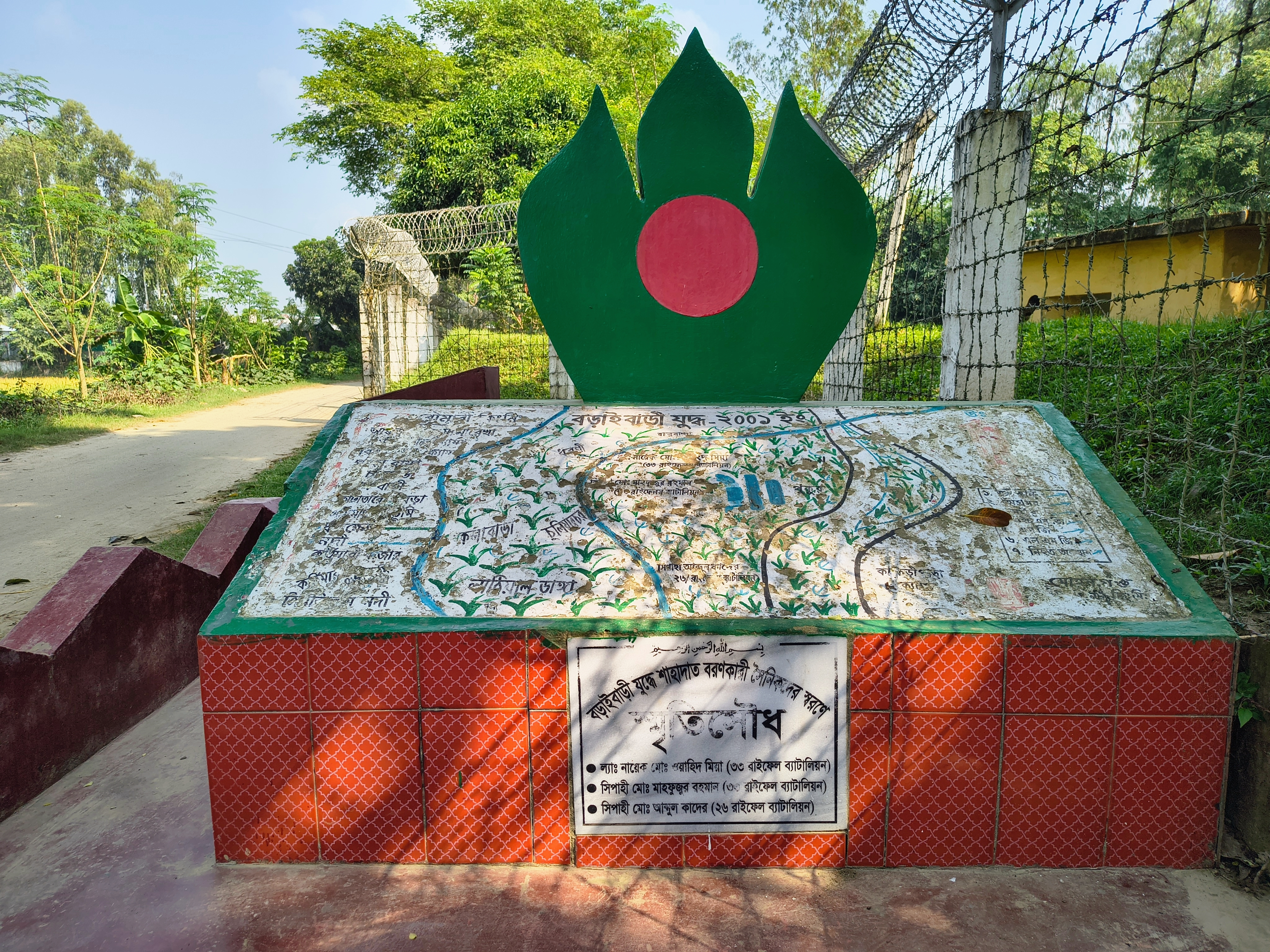
The memorial in remembrance of the Bangladeshi soldiers martyred in the Battle of Boraibari.

The notable tourist attractions in Jadur Char Union include:

- Boraibari Memorial
- Pata Dhoya Shapla Beel
- Sonavari River

== See more ==
- Union councils of Bangladesh
- Local government in Bangladesh
- Rangpur Division
