= Rokanuddaula Mandal =

Bangladeshi politician

- রোকনদ্দৌলা মন্ডল

Member of Parliament from Kurigram-4
- In office 1988 by-election – 1990
- Preceded by: Najimuddaula
- Succeeded by: Golam Hossain

Personal details
- Born: Kurigram District
- Party: Jatiya Party

Rokanuddaula Mandal is a politician of Kurigram District of Bangladesh and a former member of parliament for the Kurigram-4 constituency.

== Career ==
Mandal is a politician of Jatiya Party. He is the cousin of former President Hussein Muhammad Ershad. When Najimuddaula, an MP from Kurigram-4 constituency, died in 1988, he was elected as a member of parliament as a candidate of Jatiya Party in the by-elections.
