= Rikta Akter Banu =

School founder in Bangladesh

- Born: Bangladesh

Rikta Akter Banu is a nurse and the founder and teacher of the Learning Disability School. According to the BBC 100 Women list published in 2024. she was selected as one of the 100 most inspiring and influential women in the world.

== Early life ==
She is a resident of Ramna Sarkar Bari area of Ramna Union, Chilmari Upazila, Kurigram District.

== Learning Disability School ==
The school was originally established with the aim of educating autistic or learning-disabled children. Later, children and adolescents with various physical and mental disabilities were also enrolled here. Rikta Akter Banu, the founder of the school, has a daughter who was diagnosed with autism or cerebral palsy. She attempted to admit her daughter to a local school but was unsuccessful. As a result, she decided to establish a school herself to provide education for children with special needs.

== 100 Women (BBC) ==
In 2024, Rikta Akter Banu was selected as one of the influential and inspiring women in the BBC 100 Women list.

== See More ==
- Rikta Akhter Banu (Lutfa) Intellectual Disability School
