= Abdus Salam Azad =

Bangladeshi politician

- আব্দুস সালাম আজাদ

Member of the Bangladesh Parliament for Munshiganj-2
- Incumbent
- Assumed office 17 February 2026
- Preceded by: Sagufta Yasmin Emily

Personal details
- Party: Bangladesh Nationalist Party

Abdus Salam Azad is a Bangladeshi politician. He is the incumbent Jatiya Sangsad member representing the Munshiganj-2 constituency since 2026.

== Career ==
Azad was a senior vice president of Bangladesh Jatiotabadi Jubodal, the youth wing of the Bangladesh Nationalist Party (BNP). He became the assistant organising secretary of BNP in May 2015.

In May 2022, Azad was appointed as the organizing secretary of BNP's Dhaka division unit.

In October 2025, Azad was appointed as the joint secretary general of BNP, along with Humayun Kabir.

In December 2025, Mizanur Rahman Sinha was first announced as the BNP candidate for the Munshiganj-2 constituency for the 2026 Bangladeshi general election. But due to his illness, Azad secured the nomination instead. In February 2026, Azad then won the race securing 121,154 votes while his nearest opponent National Citizen Party candidate Majedul Islam received 58,573 votes.
