= Munshiganj-2 =

Constituency of Bangladesh's Jatiya Sangsad

Coordinates: 23.51°N 90.47°E

- Constituency for the Jatiya Sangsad
- District: Munshiganj District
- Division: Dhaka Division
- Electorate: 378,492 (2026)

Current constituency
- Created: 1984
- Party: Bangladesh Nationalist Party
- Member: Abdus Salam Azad
- ← 171 Munshiganj-1 173 Munshiganj-3 →

Munshiganj-2 is a constituency represented in the Jatiya Sangsad (National Parliament) of Bangladesh since 2026 by Abdus Salam Azad of the Bangladesh Nationalist Party.

== Boundaries ==
The constituency encompasses Lohajang and Tongibari upazilas.

== History ==
The constituency was created in 1984 from a Dhaka constituency when the former Dhaka District was split into six districts: Manikganj, Munshiganj, Dhaka, Gazipur, Narsingdi, and Narayanganj.

Ahead of the 2008 general election, the Election Commission redrew constituency boundaries to reflect population changes revealed by the 2001 Bangladesh census. The 2008 redistricting altered the boundaries of the constituency.

== Members of Parliament ==
Election	Member	Party
1986	Md Korban Ali	Jatiya Party
1988	Iqbal Hossain	Jatiya Party
1991	Muhammad Hamidullah Khan	Bangladesh Nationalist Party
Feb 1996	Muhammad Hamidullah Khan	Bangladesh Nationalist Party
Jun 1996	Mizanur Rahman Sinha	Bangladesh Nationalist Party
2001	Mizanur Rahman Sinha	Bangladesh Nationalist Party
2008	Sagufta Yasmin	Awami League
2026	Abdus Salam Azad	Bangladesh Nationalist Party

== Elections ==
=== Elections in the 2020s ===
General Election 2026: Munshiganj-2
Party	Candidate	Votes	%	±%
BNP	Abdus Salam Azad	121,154	61.6	N/A
NCP	Majedul Islam	58,573	29.8	N/A
IAB	K M Billal	13,367	6.8	N/A
JP(E)	Md Noman Mia	2,857	1.5	N/A
Islamic Front	Ashiq Mahmud	651	0.3	N/A
Majority		62,581	31.8	N/A
Turnout		196,602	51.9	N/A
Registered electors		378,492		
BNP gain from AL				

=== Elections in the 2010s ===
General Election 2014: Munshiganj-2
Party	Candidate	Votes	%	±%
AL	Sagufta Yasmin	130,263	93.8	+40.3
Independent	Mahbub Uddin Ahmed	8,461	6.1	N/A
Bangladesh Khelafat Majlis	Md. Abdul Wadud	175	0.1	N/A
Majority		121,802	87.7	+78.8
Turnout		138,899	52.3	−32.6
AL hold				

=== Elections in the 2000s ===
General Election 2008: Munshiganj-2
Party	Candidate	Votes	%	±%
AL	Sagufta Yasmin	104,876	53.5	+12.3
BNP	Mizanur Rahman Sinha	87,358	44.6	−13.3
IAB	Abdus Sattar Mollah	3,831	2.0	N/A
Majority		17,518	8.9	−7.8
Turnout		196,065	84.9	+14
AL gain from BNP				

General Election 2001: Munshiganj-2
Party	Candidate	Votes	%	±%
BNP	Mizanur Rahman Sinha	83,623	57.9	+7.5
AL	Sagufta Yasmin	59,534	41.2	+7.6
IJOF	A. Latif Hawlader	1,136	0.8	N/A
Independent	Md. Anowar Hossain	102	0.1	N/A
Jatiya Party (M)	Mia Md. Din Ul Islam Kachi	84	0.1	N/A
Independent	Md. Rafiqul Islam Dhali	59	0.0	N/A
Majority		24,089	16.7	−0.1
Turnout		144,538	70.9	−7.8
BNP hold				

=== Elections in the 1990s ===
General Election June 1996: Munshiganj-2
Party	Candidate	Votes	%	±%
BNP	Mizanur Rahman Sinha	58,455	50.4	−0.8
AL	Nurul Islam Khan	39,003	33.6	+5.4
JP(E)	Abul Bashar	14,116	12.2	+11.3
IOJ	Md. Golam Mostafa	2,378	2.0	N/A
Zaker Party	Atiqur Rahman	1,451	1.2	−2.1
Jamaat	A. B. M. Fazlul Karim	701	0.6	N/A
Majority		19,452	16.8	−6.2
Turnout		116,104	78.7	+23.9
BNP hold				

General Election 1991: Munshiganj-2
Party	Candidate	Votes	%	±%
BNP	Muhammad Hamidullah Khan	60,697	51.2	
AL	Nazrul Islam	33,422	28.2	
Independent	Sirajul Alam Fuku	13,582	11.5	
UCL	Saiful Islam	3,983	3.4	
Zaker Party	Atiqur Rahman	3,858	3.3	
JP(E)	A. Latif Hawlader	1,082	0.9	
Bangladesh Janata Party	Babul Ahmed	900	0.8	
Jatiya Janata Party and Ganatantrik Oikkya Jote	Zamal Uddin	315	0.3	
Bangladesh National Congress	Mafizur Rahman Dhali	280	0.2	
Jatiya Jukta Front	Md. Ali Hossain	177	0.1	
NAP (Muzaffar)	Dhirendra Kumar Mondol	160	0.1	
FP	D. S. M. Ismail	84	0.1	
Majority		27,275	23.0	
Turnout		118,540	54.8	
BNP gain from				
