= Saifur Rahman Rana =

Bangladesh Nationalist Party politician

- সাইফুর রহমান রানা

Member of Parliament from Kurigram-1
- In office 15 February 1996 – 12 June 1996
- Preceded by: A.K.M. Shahidul Islam
- Succeeded by: A.K.M. Mostafizur Rahman

Personal details
- Born: Kurigram District
- Party: Bangladesh Nationalist Party

Saifur Rahman Rana is a Bangladesh Nationalist Party politician. He was elected a member of parliament from Kurigram-1 in February 1996.

== Career ==
Rana was Kurigram District BNP general secretary. He was elected to parliament from Kurigram-1 as a Bangladesh Nationalist Party candidate in the 15 February 1996 Bangladeshi general election.

He was defeated from Kurigram-1 constituency on 12 June 1996, 2001, 2008 and 2018 on the nomination of the Bangladesh Nationalist Party.
