= Kurigram-4 =

Constituency of Bangladesh's Jatiya Sangsad

Coordinates: 25.57°N 89.83°E

- Constituency for the Jatiya Sangsad
- District: Kurigram District
- Division: Rangpur Division
- Electorate: 289,120 (2018)

Current constituency
- Created: 1984
- Party: Bangladesh Jamaat-e-Islami
- Member: Md. Mostafizur Rahman
- ← 27 Kurigram-3 29 Gaibandha-1 →

Kurigram-4 is a constituency represented in the Jatiya Sangsad (National Parliament) of Bangladesh since 2026 by Md. Mostafizur Rahman of the Bangladesh Jamaat-e-Islami.

== Boundaries ==
The constituency encompasses Chilmari, Char Rajibpur and Raomari upazilas.

== History ==
The constituency was created in 1984 from the Rangpur-17 constituency when the former Rangpur District was split into five districts: Nilphamari, Lalmonirhat, Rangpur, Kurigram, and Gaibandha.

Ahead of the 2018 general election, the Election Commission altered the boundaries of the constituency by removing one union parishad (Saheber Alga) of Ulipur Upazila, and adding the remainder of Chilmari Upazila to the two union parishads already included: Ashtamir Char and Nayerhat.

== Members of Parliament ==
Election	Member	Party
1986	Najimuddaula	Independent
1988	Najimuddaula	Jatiya Party
1988 by-election	Rokanuddaula	Jatiya Party
1991	Golam Hossain	Jatiya Party
Feb 1996	Abdul Bari Sarkar	Bangladesh Nationalist Party
Jun 1996	Golam Hossain	Jatiya Party
2001	Golam Habib Dulal	Islami Jatiya Oikya Front
2008	Zakir Hossain	Awami League
2014	Ruhul Amin	Jatiya Party (Manju)
2018	Zakir Hossain	Awami League
2024	Md. Biplab Hasan	Awami League

== Elections ==
=== Elections in the 2020s ===
General election 2026: Kurigram-4
Party	Candidate	Votes	%	±%
BNP	Md. Azizur Rahman			
Jamaat	Md. Mostafizur Rahman			
BSD	Sheikh Mohammed Abdul Khaliq			
Independent	Md. Rukunuzzaman			
BSD (Marxist)	Raju Ahmed			
JP(E)	K. M. Fazlul Mandal			
IAB	Md. Hafizur Rahman			
Majority				
Turnout				

=== Elections in the 2010s ===
General Election 2014: Kurigram-4
Party	Candidate	Votes	%	±%
Jatiya Party (M)	Ruhul Amin	32,607	54.8	+53.3
AL	Zakir Hossain	24,939	41.9	+4.3
Independent	Motalib Hossain	1,968	3.3	N/A
Majority		7,668	12.9	+2.6
Turnout		59,514	29.3	−56.7
Jatiya Party (M) gain from AL				

=== Elections in the 2000s ===
General Election 2008: Kurigram-4
Party	Candidate	Votes	%	±%
AL	Zakir Hossain	73,913	37.6	+19.6
JP(E)	Golam Habib Dulal	53,682	27.3	N/A
Jamaat	Noor Alam Mukul	42,968	21.9	−6.0
Independent	Md. Eman Ali	17,183	8.7	N/A
IAB	Abul Kalam Azad	4,319	2.2	N/A
Jatiya Party (M)	Md. Lutfor Rahaman	3,030	1.5	−9.9
BSD	Md. Mohi Uddin Ahmed	1,090	0.6	N/A
Independent	Rukunur Dowlla	327	0.2	N/A
Majority		20,231	10.3	−2.3
Turnout		196,512	86.0	+13.4
AL gain from IJOF				

General Election 2001: Kurigram-4
Party	Candidate	Votes	%	±%
IJOF	Golam Habib Dulal	62,484	40.5	N/A
Jamaat	Md. Abdul Latif	43,025	27.9	+11.7
AL	Shawkat Ali Sarkar	27,856	18.0	−2.4
Jatiya Party (M)	Golam Hossain	17,568	11.4	N/A
Bangladesh Samajtantrik Dal (Basad-Khalekuzzaman)	Md. Abul Bashar Monju	3,458	2.2	N/A
Majority		19,459	12.6	−7.5
Turnout		154,391	72.6	+7.4
IJOF gain from JP(E)				

=== Elections in the 1990s ===
General Election June 1996: Kurigram-4
Party	Candidate	Votes	%	±%
JP(E)	Golam Hossain	42,790	40.5	+11.3
AL	Shawkat Ali Sarkar	21,514	20.4	+5.9
Jamaat	Md. Sirajul Haque	17,064	16.2	−4.9
BNP	Md. Abdul Bari Sarkar	12,698	12.0	−1.5
Independent	Azizur Rahman	7,985	7.6	N/A
IOJ	Abul Kalam Azad	1,469	1.4	N/A
Zaker Party	Md. Nurul Alam	1,203	1.1	+0.3
Bangladesh Samajtantrik Dal (Khalekuzzaman)	Abul Bashar Manju	431	0.4	N/A
Sramik Krishak Samajbadi Dal	Md. Nurul Islam	282	0.3	−5.0
FP	A. B. M. Moinul Islam	185	0.2	−0.9
Majority		21,276	20.1	+11.9
Turnout		105,621	65.2	+24.3
JP(E) hold				

General Election 1991: Kurigram-4
Party	Candidate	Votes	%	±%
JP(E)	Golam Hossain	21,991	29.2	
Jamaat	Md. Sirajul Haque	15,854	21.1	
AL	Md. Azizul Haq	10,915	14.5	
BNP	Azizur Rahman	10,169	13.5	
Independent	Md. Abul Kashem	7,550	10.0	
Sramik Krishak Samajbadi Dal	Md. Nurul Islam Sarker	3,998	5.3	
Independent	Md. Anwar Hossain	2,024	2.7	
Independent	Mohammad Sadakat Hossain	911	1.2	
FP	A. B. M. Moinul Islam	801	1.1	
Zaker Party	Md. Nurul Alam	577	0.8	
CPB	Md. Golam Hider	263	0.3	
Jatia Mukti Dal	Md. Amjad Hossain	219	0.3	
Majority		6,137	8.2	
Turnout		75,272	40.9	
JP(E) hold				
