= Kurigram-1 =

Constituency of Bangladesh's Jatiya Sangsad

Coordinates: 25.97°N 89.69°E

- Constituency for the Jatiya Sangsad
- District: Kurigram District
- Division: Rangpur Division
- Electorate: 563,978 (2026)

Current constituency
- Created: 1984
- Party: Bangladesh Jamaat-e-Islami
- Member: Md. Anwarul Islam
- ← 24 Rangpur-6 26 Kurigram-2 →

Kurigram-1 is a constituency represented in the Jatiya Sangsad (National Parliament) of Bangladesh since 2026 by Md. Anwarul Islam of the Bangladesh Jamaat-e-Islami.

== Boundaries ==
The constituency encompasses Bhurungamari and Nageshwari upazilas.

== History ==
The constituency was created in 1984 from a Rangpur constituency when the former Rangpur District was split into five districts: Nilphamari, Lalmonirhat, Rangpur, Kurigram, and Gaibandha.

== Members of Parliament ==
Election	Member	Party
1986	A.K.M. Shahidul Islam	Jatiya Party (Ershad)
Feb 1996	Saifur Rahman Rana	Bangladesh Nationalist Party
Jun 1996	A.K.M. Mostafizur Rahman	Jatiya Party (Ershad)
2001	A.K.M. Mostafizur Rahman	Islami Jatiya Oikya Front
2008	A.K.M. Mostafizur Rahman	Jatiya Party (Ershad)
2014	A.K.M. Mostafizur Rahman	Jatiya Party (Ershad)
2018	Aslam Hossain Saudagar	Bangladesh Awami League
2024	A.K.M. Mostafizur Rahman	Jatiya Party (Ershad)
2026	Md Anwarul Islam	Bangladesh Jamaat-e-Islami

== Elections ==
=== Elections in the 2020s ===
General election 2026: Kurigram-1
Party	Candidate	Votes	%	±%
Jamaat	Md. Anwarul Islam	141,090		
BNP	Saifur Rahman Rana	123,025		
Majority				
Turnout		360,482		
Registered electors		563,978		
Jamaat gain from JP(E)				

=== Elections in the 2010s ===
General Election 2014: Kurigram-1
Party	Candidate	Votes	%	±%
JP(E)	A.K.M. Mostafizur Rahman (Note: Sources vary with regard to the 2014 vote count. They report between 74,429 and 74,720 votes for the winner, between 30,172 and 38,172 votes for the runner up, and between 0 and 1,601 votes for the third place finisher, but the discrepancies in the figures are not large enough to change the overall outcome.)	74,720	69.9	+4.5
Independent	Md. Abdul Hai	30,613	28.7	N/A
Jatiya Party (M)	Rashid Ahmed	1,500	1.4	N/A
Majority		44,107	41.3	+13.8
Turnout		106,833	26.0	−62.0
JP(E) hold				

=== Elections in the 2000s ===
General Election 2008: Kurigram-1
Party	Candidate	Votes	%	±%
JP(E)	A.K.M. Mostafizur Rahman	209,899	65.4	N/A
BNP	Saifur Rahman Rana	92,583	28.8	−5.6
IAB	Golam Mostofa Md. Ansar Ali	17,465	5.4	N/A
KSJL	Kazi Md. Latiful Kabir	1,221	0.4	N/A
Majority		117,316	27.5	+26.7
Turnout		321,168	88.0	+9.5
JP(E) gain from IJOF				

General Election 2001: Kurigram-1
Party	Candidate	Votes	%	±%
IJOF	A.K.M. Mostafizur Rahman	89,073	35.2	N/A
BNP	Saifur Rahman Rana	87,157	34.4	+11.0
AL	Md. Shamsul Haq Chowdhury	75,730	29.9	+4.7
Jatiya Party (M)	Md. Ershadul Haque Dipu	543	0.2	N/A
Bangladesher Samajtantrik Dal (Basad-Khalekuzzaman)	Jahedul Haque Milu	398	0.2	N/A
JSD	Shree Gopinath Ray	279	0.1	N/A
Majority		1,916	0.8	−12.3
Turnout		253,180	78.5	+11.6
IJOF gain from JP(E)				

=== Elections in the 1990s ===
General Election June 1996: Kurigram-1
Party	Candidate	Votes	%	±%
JP(E)	A.K.M. Mostafizur Rahman	64,064	38.3	−0.5
AL	Md. Mozammel Haque Prodhan	42,125	25.2	−1.2
BNP	Saifur Rahman Rana	39,088	23.4	+12.1
Jamaat	Md. Kamruddin	16,401	9.8	−11.8
IOJ	Md. Abdur Rahman Prodhan	4,714	2.8	N/A
Zaker Party	Kaflur Rahman	583	0.3	−0.3
Gano Forum	Shahidul Islam	318	0.2	N/A
Majority		21,939	13.1	+0.7
Turnout		167,293	66.9	+20.8
JP(E) hold				

General Election 1991: Kurigram-1
Party	Candidate	Votes	%	±%
JP(E)	A.K.M. Shahidul Islam	46,476	38.8	
AL	Md. Abdus Sabur Chawdhury	31,630	26.4	
Jamaat	Md. Kamruddin	25,876	21.6	
BNP	Md. Khairul Alam	13,543	11.3	
Bangladesh Samajtantrik Dal (Khalekuzzaman)	Md. Zahedul Haq	805	0.7	
Zaker Party	Md. Kafilur Rahman	659	0.6	
CPB	Md. Abdul Hai	477	0.4	
IOJ	Fazlul Haq Chairman	290	0.2	
Majority		14,846	12.4	
Turnout		119,756	46.1	
JP(E) hold				
