= Rikta Akhter Banu (Lutfa) Intellectual Disability School =

Special education school in Kurigram, Bangladesh

- রিকতা আখতার বানু (লুৎফা) বুদ্ধি প্রতিবন্ধী বিদ্যালয়
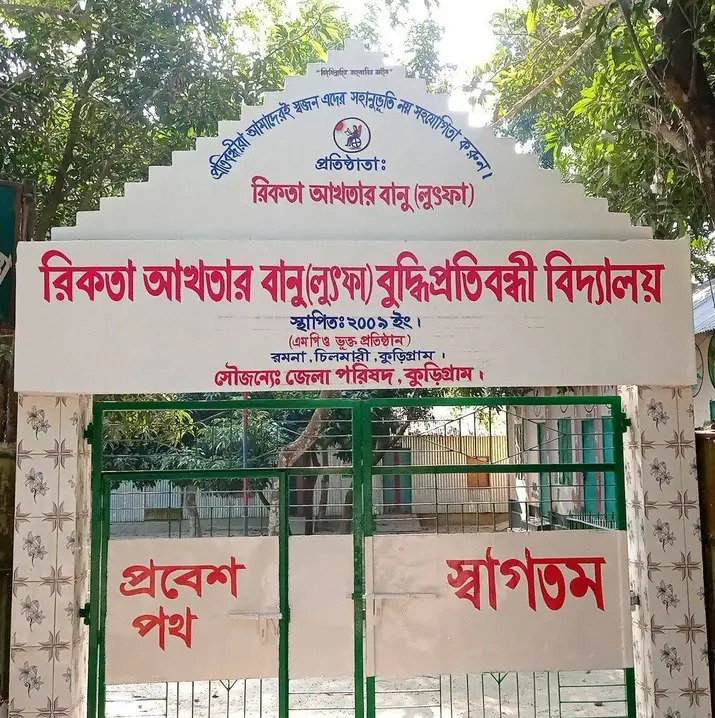
- Entrance
- Ramna, Chilmari; Bangladesh

Information
- Type: Special education school
- Established: 2009
- Founder: Rikta Akhter Banu
- School district: Kurigram District

Rikta Akhter Banu (Lutfa) Intellectual Disability School is a specialized educational institution located in Chilmari Upazila of Kurigram District, Bangladesh. The school primarily works for the education and improvement of the quality of life for children with intellectual disabilities and autism.

== History ==
The founder, Rikta Akhter Banu, initially enrolled her own disabled child in a mainstream school. However, after some time, the school authorities informed her that it was no longer possible to teach the child there. Following this experience, she decided to establish a dedicated school for children with disabilities. In 2009, with approximately 60 children, she founded this institution.

== Activities ==
The school follows specialized teaching methods for children with intellectual disabilities and autism. In addition to traditional education, the institution provides:

- Speech therapy
- Physiotherapy
- Vocational training (handicrafts, painting, etc.)
- Sports and cultural activities

== Infrastructure ==
The school has its own building and a playground. There is a specialized transportation system for the students, and the school employs trained teachers and caregivers to support the children's needs.

== Impact ==
The school has become a symbol of hope for children with disabilities in a large area of Chilmari and surrounding regions. Many students from this institution have participated in sports and cultural competitions at the district and divisional levels and won awards.

== See also ==
- Education in Bangladesh
