= Mohammad Sirajul Haque =

Bangladeshi politician

- মোহাম্মদ সিরাজুল হক

Member of the Bangladesh Parliament for Rangpur-17 (now Kurigram-4)
- In office 2 April 1979 – 24 March 1982

Personal details
- Born: 15 February 1947 (age 79) Kurigram, Bengal Province, British India
- Party: Bangladesh Jamaat-e-Islami; Islamic Democratic League

Mohammad Sirajul Haque is a Bangladesh politician of Kurigram District and former member of parliament for the undivided Rangpur-17 (now Kurigram-4) constituency in 1979.

== Biography ==
Mohammad Sirajul Haq was born on 15 February 1947 in Bara Madhartila village of what is now Rowmari Upazila, Kurigram District, Bangladesh.

== Career ==
Haque was a professor at Kurigram College and principal of Roumari Degree College. Time to time he practised as a lawyer at the Kugrigram District Court. He was elected a member of parliament from undivided Rangpur-17 as an Islamic Democratic League candidate in the 1979 Bangladeshi general election. When Bangladesh Jamaat-e-Islami was established in 1979, he joined Jamaat politics.

Haque was defeated in the third parliamentary elections of 1986, the fifth parliamentary elections of 1991 and the seventh parliamentary elections of 12 June 1996 as a candidate of Bangladesh Jamaat-e-Islami from Kurigram-4 constituency.
