= Sagufta Yasmin Emily =

Bangladeshi politician (born 1962)

- সাগুফতা ইয়াসমিন এমিলি

Member of the Bangladesh Parliament for Munshiganj-2
- In office 24 January 2009 – 6 August 2024
- Preceded by: Mizanur Rahman Sinha
- Succeeded by: Abdus Salam Azad

Personal details
- Born: 3 November 1962 (age 63)
- Party: Bangladesh Awami League

Sagufta Yasmin Emily (born 3 November 1962) is a Bangladesh Awami League politician and a former Jatiya Sangsad member representing the Munshiganj-2 constituency. She served as a whip of the parliament in the 9th Parliament (2009-2013).

== Education ==
Emily completed her bachelor's and master's degree in geography from the University of Dhaka in 1984 and 1986 respectively.

== Career ==
Emily was elected to parliament from Munshiganj District in January 2009 as a candidate of the Bangladesh Awami League.

Emily was reelected to the parliament in January 2014. On 8 March 2010 at a roundtable organized by Transparency International Bangladesh, she described religiously motivated terrorism as an obstacle for the advancement for women in Bangladesh. At the Padma Bridge—New Lifeline of Development organized by BSRM and The Daily Star on 10 January 2016, where she talked about the effects of river erosion in her constituency, she told the panel how the local government had to use millions of takas worth of sandbags to prevent erosion. In July 2016 she accused some non-government organisations of being involved with activities against the state and called for the government to take action against them. State Minister for Social Welfare Nuruzzaman Ahmed said the government will monitor their activities and that the government was willing to take "drastic action" if the situation demands it.
