= Md. Biplab Hasan =

Bangladeshi politician

- বিপ্লব হাসান পলাশ

Member of the Bangladesh Parliament for Kurigram-4
- In office 7 January 2024 – 6 August 2024
- Preceded by: Md Zakir Hossain
- Succeeded by: Md. Mostafizur Rahman

Personal details
- Born: 24 November 1986 (age 39)
- Party: Awami League

Md. Biplab Hasan (born 24 November 1986) is a Awami League politician and a former member of parliament from Kurigram-4 in 2024.

== Career ==
Hasan was elected to parliament from Kurigram-4 as an Awami League candidate on 7 January 2024.
