= Hamidul Haque Khandker =

Bangladeshi politician

- হামিদুল হক খন্দকার

Member of the Bangladesh Parliament for Kurigram-2
- In office 10 January 2024 – 6 August 2024
- Preceded by: Ponir Uddin Ahmed
- Succeeded by: Atiqur Rahman Mojahid

Personal details
- Born: 12 March 1955 (age 71)
- Party: Independent
- Education: Rangpur Medical College

Hamidul Haque Khandkar (born 12 March 1955) is a Bangladeshi politician and a former Jatiya Sangsad member representing the Kurigram-2 constituency in 2024. He is an Orthopedic surgeon and currently serving as Professor and Head of the Orthopedics Department at Rangpur Community Medical College & Hospital.

He lost his seat as a member of parliament when President Mohammad Shahabuddin dissolved the National Parliament after the fall of the Awami League government through a student uprising in 2024.
