= Chilmari Upazila =

Chilmari চিলমারী
- Upazila
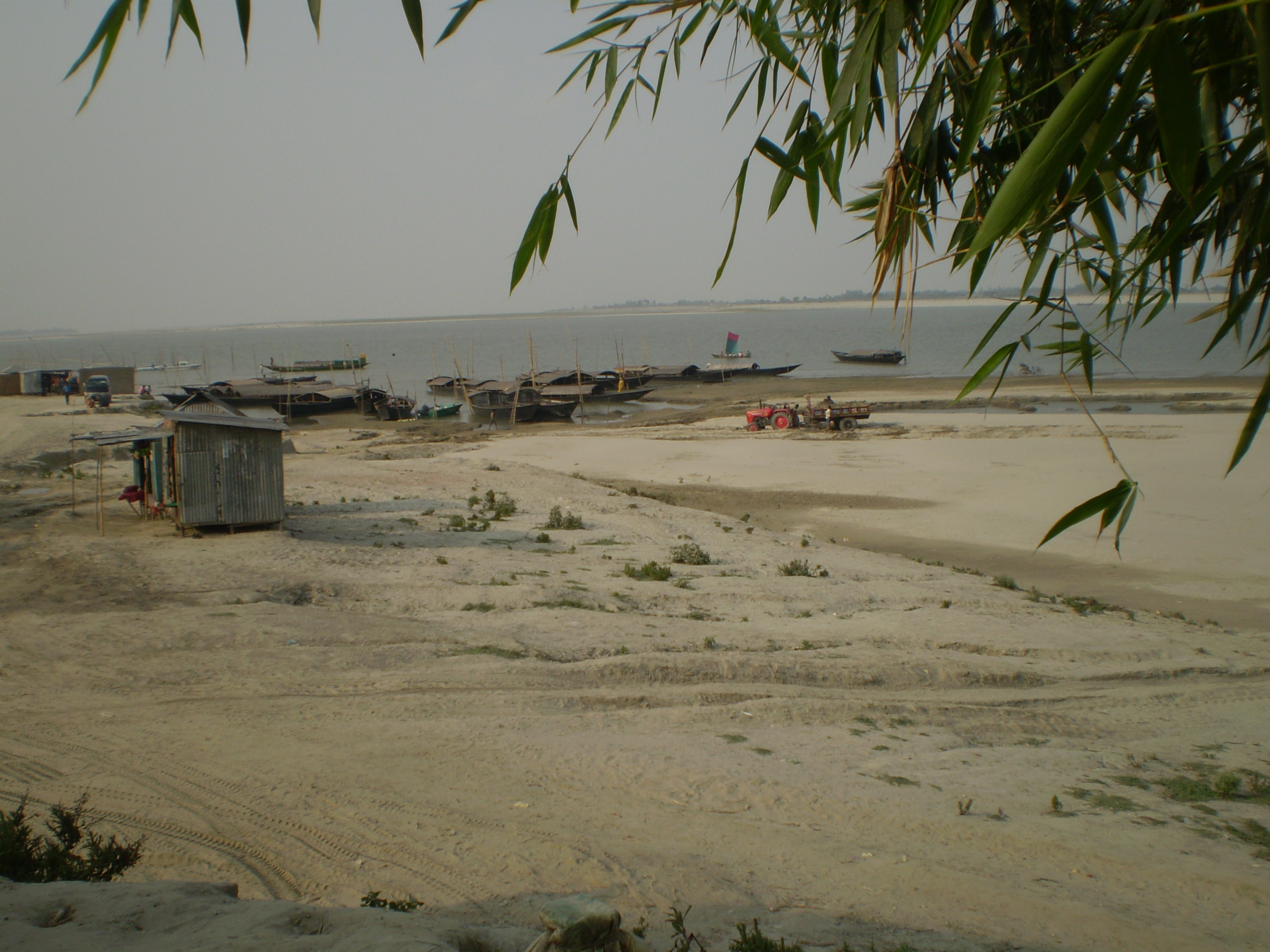
- Jamuna River in Chilmari

- Coordinates: 25°34′N 89°41.5′E
- Country: Bangladesh
- Division: Rangpur
- District: Kurigram

Area
  - Total: 224.96 km^{2} (86.86 sq mi)

Population (2022)
  - Total: 131,715
  - Density: 585.50/km^{2} (1,516.4/sq mi)
- Time zone: UTC+6 (BST)
- Postal code: 5630
- Website: chilmari.kurigram.gov.bd

Chilmari Upazila mauza geocode map

Chilmari (Bengali: চিলমারী) is an upazila of Kurigram District in the Division of Rangpur, Bangladesh.

== History ==
Chilmari was river port during the Pakistani and British Rule. During the war of Independence of Bangladesh in 1971, the Chilmari Riverborne Amphibious Landing Assault was conducted by then BDF Sector 11, Mankarchar Sub-Sector, led by Squadron Leader M. Hamidullah Khan with participation of the 3rd East Bengal Regiment.

=== Etymology ===
The region known as Chilmari Thana came into existence in 1850. There is a vast narrative surrounding the naming of Chilmari, filled with various folklore and legends. Among the many popular stories and beliefs, it is difficult to say with certainty which one is accurate.

According to Folklore 1, several hundred years ago, most of the land in Chilmari was covered with sand. It is said that a significant amount of Chinese grass (Chin) used to be cultivated in this sandy region. As a result, the area was supposedly named Chinmari, where "Mari" means place or land. Over time, this name is believed to have evolved into the present-day Chilmari.

Folklore 2 suggests that once, there was a great disturbance caused by chila (kite) birds in this area. Flocks of kites would invade the paddy and cultivated lands, destroying thousands of acres of crops. Their nuisance was so intense that people could hardly live peacefully in markets and villages. The terror of these birds disrupted public life. These kites used to roam in flocks along the banks of the Brahmaputra River and nested in bamboo groves, mango orchards, or on the branches of banyan trees. It is said that if anyone accidentally killed a kite, a massive number of birds would immediately arrive and attack that person’s home for six or seven days. To resolve this issue, people appealed to the British government, which eventually ordered the extermination of the birds. When this news reached various parts of Kurigram, people took up bows and arrows and followed the armed British soldiers to help the residents of Chilmari get rid of the kite menace. Crowds of people descended upon the fields and marketplaces of Chilmari. When curious onlookers asked where they were going, they would chant in unison: "Cholo Cholo Chilmari" (Let’s go, let’s go to Chilmari). It is believed that the name Chilmari originated from this slogan.

Folklore 3 tells that at one time, a river port was established along the banks of the Brahmaputra River. Large boats and ships would anchor there, unload goods, and reload for journeys to other ports. The British administration established a customs office at the port for tax collection. The customs officer would stamp the goods once the duties were paid. Illiterate locals began referring to the customs office as Sil-Mari (meaning stamp place). Over time, this Sil-Mari is believed to have transformed into Chilmari.

During the early British rule, the East India Company initiated an agricultural industrial revolution in the Baharband Pargana area by cultivating indigo. Some of the indigo factories were located in what was then Raniganj. Indigo products were stamped and stored in warehouses before being shipped overseas. Author Mostafa Tofael Hossain has suggested that the name Chilmari originated from this stamping (sil) process.

== Geography ==
Chilmari is located at 25.5667°N 89.6917°E. It has 30,966 households and total area 224.96 km^{2}. Situated in the northern part of Bangladesh, it is located near the Indo-Bangladesh frontier. Chilmari Upazila is intersected by the mighty Brahmaputra River.

The upazila is bounded by Ulipur Upazila on the north, Char Rajibpur Upazila and Sundarganj Upazila of Gaibandha District on the south, Raomari Upazila and Char Rajibpur Upazila on the east, Sundarganj and Ulipur upazilas on the west.

== Demographics ==
Religions in Chilmari Upazila (2022)
Religion	Percent
Islam	95.13%
Hinduism	4.83%
Other or not stated	0.04%

According to the 2022 Bangladeshi census, Chilmari Upazila had 34,576 households and a population of 131,715. 9.79% of the population were under 5 years of age. Chilmari had a literacy rate (age 7 and over) of 66.38%: 69.03% for males and 63.81% for females, and a sex ratio of 98.16 males for every 100 females. 38,137 (28.95%) lived in urban areas.

According to the 2011 Census of Bangladesh, Chilmari Upazila had 30,966 households and a population of 122,841. 32,533 (26.48%) were under 10 years of age. Chilmari had a literacy rate (age 7 and over) of 39.67%, compared to the national average of 51.8%, and a sex ratio of 1068 females per 1000 males. 45,215 (36.81%) lived in urban areas.

As of the 1991 Census of Bangladesh, Chilmari has a population of 100,516. Males constitute 49.98% of the population, and females 50.02%. This Upazila's eighteen up population is 47851. Chilmari has an average literacy rate of 23.7% (7+ years), and the national average of 32.4% literate.

== Administration ==
Chilmari Upazila is divided into six union parishads: Ashtamir Char, Chilmari, Nayar Hat, Ramna, Raniganj, and Thanahat. The union parishads are subdivided into 50 mauzas and 166 villages.

=== Ninth Parliament election from Kurigram-4 ===
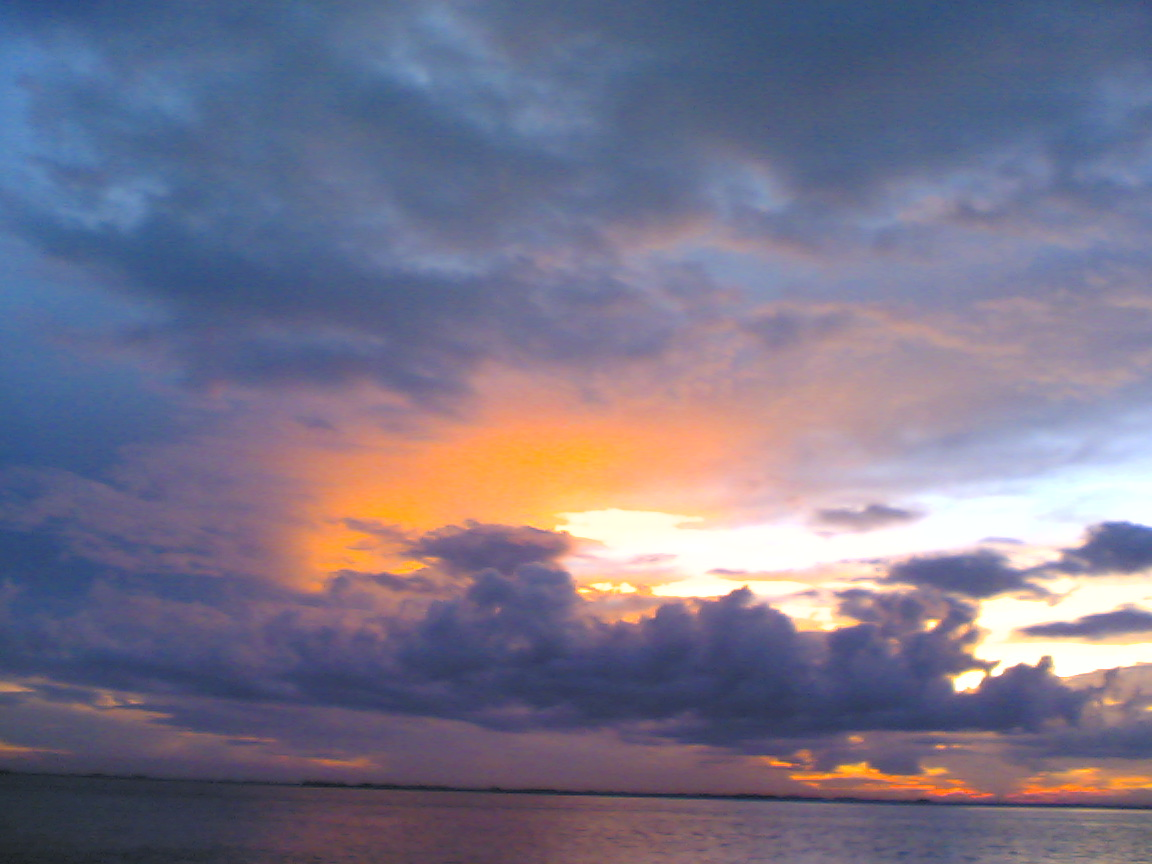
Sunset over the Brahmaputra River

In the ninth parliament election (জাতীয় সংসদ নির্বাচন) held on 29 December 2008 a total of eight candidates, including two independent ones, are contesting but the contest will be mainly limited to three candidates: former JP MP Md. Golam Habib Dulal from JP-Ershad, Md. Jakir Hossain from AL and Md. Nur Alam Mukul from Jamaat-e Islami candidate of BNP-led four-party alliance. The Jamaat-e Islami candidate is using 'Scale' as the symbol.

The majority voters are in the eastern side of the Brahmaputra river. There are 1,56,822 voters in Raumari and Rajipur upazilas, while 71,730 voters in Chilmari upazila. Of the Chilmari voters, there are about 20,000 voters in Astomir Char and Nayarhat unions under Chilmari that is situated on the eastern side of the Brahmaputra river.

Finally Md. Jakir Hossain from AL elected MP for the 9th Parliament election, 2008 ( Kurigram-4).

== Education ==
The literacy rate in this upazila is 50 percent. Other statistics are as follows:

- Colleges: 3 (1 government)
- High schools: 11
- Madrasas: 12
- Government primary schools: 55
- Non-government primary schools: 35

== Economy ==
- Total arable land: 15,003 acres
- Cash crops: paddy, wheat, potato, jute, peanuts, tobacco, maize, etc.
- There are no industrial establishments
- Although the Chilmari port was once an ancient commercial hub centered on import and export, it ceased operation in 1965.

== Notable residents ==
- Mohammad Sadakat Hossain, Member of Parliament, lived in Chilmari.

== See also ==
- Upazilas of Bangladesh
- Districts of Bangladesh
- Divisions of Bangladesh
