= Md. Umar Farooq =

Bangladeshi politician

- মো. উমর ফারুক

Member of Parliament from Kurigram-2
- In office 15 February 1996 – 12 June 1996
- Preceded by: Md. Tajul Islam Choudhury
- Succeeded by: Md. Tajul Islam Choudhury

Personal details
- Born: Kurigram District
- Party: Bangladesh Nationalist Party

Md. Umar Farooq is a Bangladesh Nationalist Party politician. He was elected a member of parliament from Kurigram-2 in February 1996.

== Career ==
Umar Farooq is the Kurigram district BNP advisor. He is the former chairman of Holokhana Union of Kurigram Sadar Upazila. He was elected to parliament from Kurigram-2 as a Bangladesh Nationalist Party candidate in 15 February 1996 Bangladeshi general election.
