= Acme Laboratories =

Pharmaceutical company in Bangladesh

The ACME Laboratories Ltd.
- Type: Public
- Traded as: DSE: ACMELAB, CSE: ACMELAB
- Industry: Pharmaceutical
- Founded: 1954; 72 years ago
- Headquarters: Dhaka, Bangladesh
- Key people: Mizanur Rahman Sinha (managing director); Nagina Afzal Sinha (chairperson)
- Website: acmeglobal.com

The ACME Laboratories Ltd. is a pharmaceutical company based in Bangladesh. It is part of the ACME Group of Companies. Mizanur Rahman Sinha is the managing director and largest shareholder of the company and Nagina Afzal Sinha is the chairperson.

== Corporate history ==
- 1954 Year of the establishment (initially as a partnership)
- 1976 The firm was converted into a private limited company
- 1983 Commercial operation at the modernized plant equipped with sophisticated and advanced facilities
- 1995 Company reaches golden jubilee

Following regulatory approval in March 2019, ACME began exporting to the United Kingdom in December 2019. The next year, they entered the United States market by exporting Zolpidem, a generic sleeping tablet.

The company set up a plant in the Active Pharmaceutical Ingredients (API) Industrial Park in Gazaria Upazila of Munshiganj District by March 2023, but was unable to start production for a year because of the lack of a natural gas connection. Titas Gas blamed insufficient gas supply for the delay.

== Factories ==
ACME's plant is located at Dhulivita in Dhamrai, about 40 km northwest of Dhaka.
