= Md Anwarul Islam (politician) =

Bangladeshi politician

Md Anwarul Islam is a Bangladeshi politician affiliated with Bangladesh Jamaat-e-Islami. He is an elected Member of Parliament from the Kurigram-1 constituency.
