= Golam Hossain (Bangladeshi politician) =

Bangladeshi politician

Md. Golam Hossain

Member of Bangladesh Parliament
- In office 1991–1996
- Preceded by: Najimuddaula
- Succeeded by: Abdul Bari Sarkar
- In office June 1996 – 2001
- Preceded by: Abdul Bari Sarkar
- Succeeded by: Golam Habib Dulal

Personal details
- Party: Jatiya Party (Ershad)

Md. Golam Hossain is a Jatiya Party (Ershad) politician and a former member of parliament for Kurigram-4.

== Career ==
Hossain was elected to parliament from Kurigram-4 as a Jatiya Party candidate in 1991. He was elected again in June 1996.
