= National Democratic Front (Bangladesh) =

Bangladeshi political alliance

National Democratic Front জাতীয় গণতান্ত্রিক ফ্রন্ট
- Abbreviation: NDF
- Leader: Anwar Hossain Manju (JP(M))
- President: Anisul Islam Mahmud (JP(E))
- Spokesperson: ABM Ruhul Amin Howlader (JP(E))
- Founder: Anwar Hossain Manju (JP(M)); Anisul Islam Mahmud (JP(E))
- Founded: 8 December 2025 (323 days)
- Dissolved: February 2026 (de facto)
- Political position: Big tent
- Member parties: 14

The National Democratic Front (Bengali: জাতীয় গণতান্ত্রিক ফ্রন্ট, romanised: Jātīẏô Gôṇôtāntrik Phrônṭ, abbreviated: NDF) is a Bangladeshi multi-party political alliance led by the Anisul faction of the Jatiya Party (Ershad) and the Jatiya Party (Manju). It was founded on 8 December 2025, ahead of the 2026 general election.

== Background ==
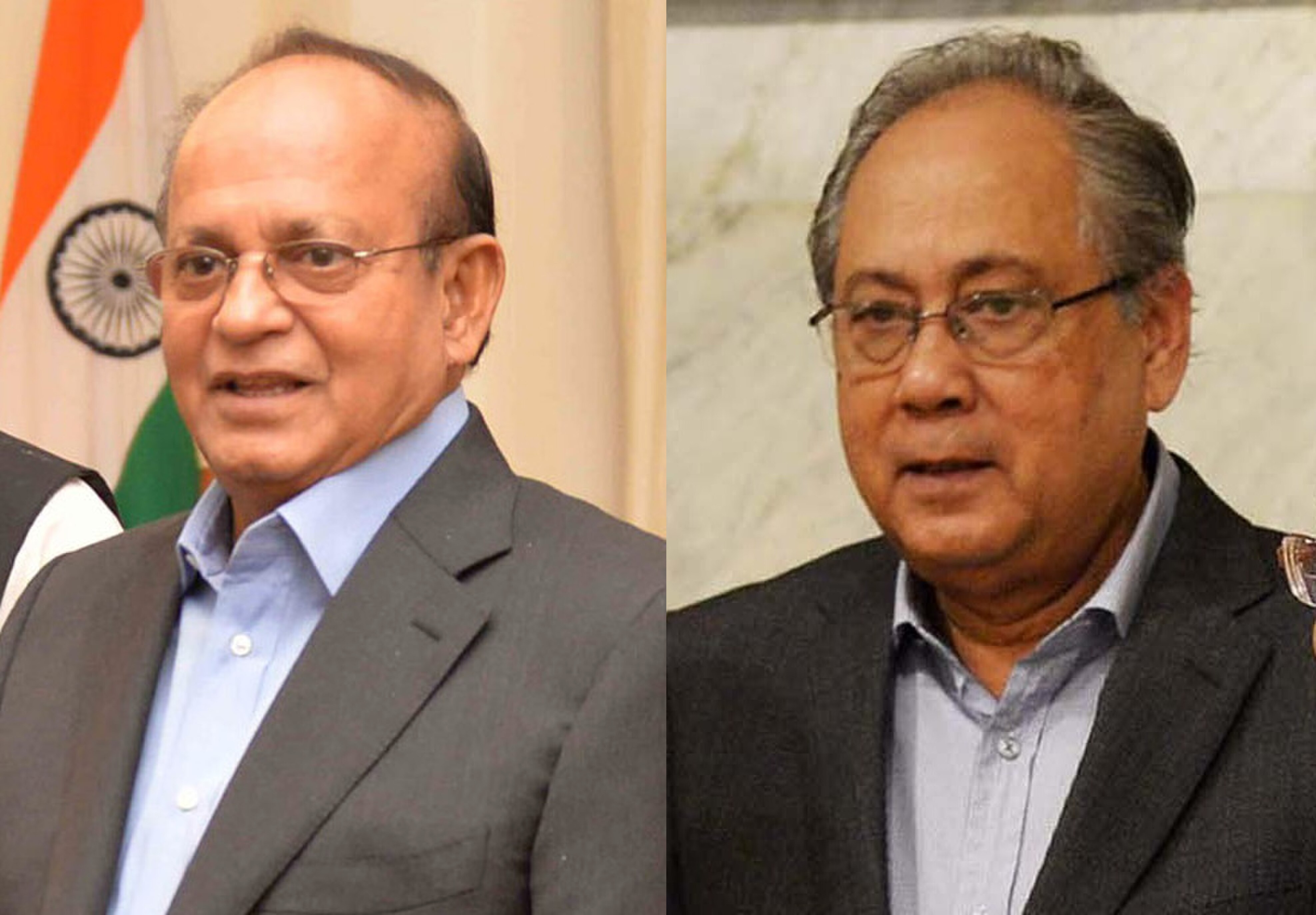
Key leaders of the NDF: Jatiya Party (Manju) chairman Anwar Hossain Manju (left) and Jatiya Party (Ershad) faction chairman Anisul Islam Mahmud (right).

After the Independence of Bangladesh in 1971, the country plunged into political instability, culminating in the 15 August 1975 coup d'état, which began a series of coups and counter-coups in the country. In continuation, Hussain Muhammad Ershad seized power in a military coup in 1982. He later assumed the presidency and after various political initiatives, the Jatiya Party (Ershad) was founded in 1986. Members of other parties and other civil society members became a part of the ruling party, including Anisul Islam Mahmud, Anwar Hossain Manju, ABM Ruhul Amin Hawlader among others. Mahmud and Howlader were initially members of the Bangladesh Nationalist Party, the party of Ziaur Rahman, who seized power like Ershad during a military coup before him. Manju, the then editor of The Daily Ittefaq, was the son of Tofazzal Hossain Manik Miah, one of the leading journalist leaders of the Bengali nationalist struggle. Both Mahmud and Manju occupied senior ministerial posts in the Ershad ministry. However, in the face of continuous protests, the Ershad regime fell in 1990. Later on, Bangladesh returned to the parliamentary system.

Even though Ershad fell as a dictator, his party consolidated as an important influencing "kingmaker" in the country's politics for the next three decades. After the June 1996 general election, when the Awami League, the party that led the country's independence and ruled it in the beginning, fell just below the supermajority of seats, the party's president Sheikh Hasina was finally able to form the government with Jatiya Party's support. Manju, the party's then secretary-general, played the most vital role in convincing the jailed Ershad to support an AL government. Later, before the 2001 general election, when Ershad withdrew support from the Hasina government to join the BNP-led right-wing 20 Party Alliance, the comparatively left-leaning and secular faction of the Jatiya Party, led by Manju, broke away and remained in support of the AL government, preventing its fall. This formation of the Jatiya Party (Manju) was the party's first major breakup, after which the party has split up numerous times. According to many political analysts, the party is one of the, if not the top political party of Bangladesh that has been so repeatedly "bracketed", with each breakdown gradually weakening the party.

In 2001, Ershad would formed the separate Islami Jatiya Oikya Front, only to pull the worst performance till then. After the 2006–2008 political crisis, Mahmud's role within the party during the Fakhruddin-led caretaker government strained the relation between him and Ershad, and Manju became briefly inactive in politics. In the 2008 general election, Jatiya Party (Ershad) went with the AL to form the Grand Alliance (Bangladesh) which won a massive landslide, ushering the 16-year rule of Sheikh Hasina. During her time, three controversial elections were held in 2014, 2018 and 2024. Jatiya Party's participation in these election earned them the role of opposition in the Jatiya Sangsad, and for this position, the party was accused by its opponents and analysts of legitimising Hasina's increasingly authoritarian rule. Manju's Jatiya Party (JP) joined the AL-led left-leaning Grand Alliance (Bangladesh) after 2014. After the death of Ershad in 2019, his party experienced internal rifts among GM Quader and Raushan Ershad, where Mahmud switched sides in different times. The July Revolution of 2024 resulted in the Resignation of Sheikh Hasina, after which the activities of Awami League and it's associates were banned. The Grand Alliance and other related upstart became practically defunct, and factions of the Jatiya Party were severely cornered in national politics.

== History ==
After bloody clashes during the July Revolution, Prime Minister Sheikh Hasina resigned on 5 August, bringing an end to long-standing rule. Chief of Army Staff Waker-uz-Zaman met with the political parties excluding the Grand Alliance (Bangladesh) to resolve the crisis at that time, first himself and later with President Mohammed Shahabuddin at Bangabhaban after Hasina's resignation was verbally announced. The then parliamentary Leader and Deputy Leader of the Opposition GM Quader and Anisul Islam Mahmud, who were leaders of the Quader faction of Jatiya Party (Ershad), were also present at these meetings. However, The party was no longer invited to various dialogues initiated by the interim government that was later formed with Muhammad Yunus as the Chief Adviser. Additionally, at the blame of "accomplice of autocrat", the party was subjected to several attacks and vandalism across the country, including its national office. In 2025, as its committee's term had expired and to strengthen the party, the Quader-led faction announced a national council, which was later suspended by Quader after a panel led by Mahmud and A. B. M. Ruhul Amin Howlader prepared to contest against him. Calling the suspension illegal, the Anisul-Howlader faction held a council along with some leaders from Rowshan Ershad's faction and formed a new committee, where they were elected the party's chairman and general secretary, respectively. They took initiatives to unite factions of the party which was rejected by the Quader faction who claimed themselves as the "real" Jatiya Party and the owner of its electoral symbol, plough.

Discussions to form a multi-party alliance along with Anwar Hossain Manju's Jatiya Party (Manju) began in November as an extension of the party's unity process, initiated by the Anisul faction. The alliance's initial name was reported in various news outlets to be 'Nationalist Democratic Alliance'. After several rounds of meetings, the alliance would launch under the name 'National Democratic Front (NDF)' in a conference centre in Dhaka's Gulshan on 8 December 2025. Although it was formed just before the 2026 general elections, front leaders claim that a long-term political alliance was the focus and not the immediate elections. Manju was declared as the front's chief adviser, while Mahmud and Howlader were declared chairman and spokesperson, respectively. 20 parties were mentioned as members of the front in the written declaration but 18 verbally, of which six parties were said to be registered by the Bangladesh Election Commission. Some political parties that participated in the discussions to form the front were absent, and there was some controversy over the actual number of members in the alliance. Apart from JaPa and JP, notable parties among the front members include Ilias Kanchan's Janata Party Bangladesh (JPB), Trinomool BNP, Bangladesh Muslim League led by Mohsen Rashid, Bangladesh Nationalist Movement, etc. Among them, JPB's acting president and former JaPa leader Golam Sarwar Milon was appointed as the chief coordinator of the front.

The alliance declared candidates for 119 out of 300 constituencies on 23 December 2025, including the seats of top leaders of the member parties.

Party	Leader
Jatiya Party (Manju)	Anwar Hossain Manju
Jatiya Party (Ershad) (Anisul faction)	Anisul Islam Mahmud
Trinomool BNP	Antara Selima Huda
Janata Party Bangladesh	Ilias Kanchan
Bangladesh Nationalist Movement	Taimur Alam Khandaker
Bangladesh Sangskritik Muktijote	Abu Layes Munna
Bangladesh Muslim League	Mohsin Rashid
Jatiya Islamic Mahajote	
Bangladesh Independent Party	
Alliance Democratic Party	
Bangladesh Democratic Movement	
National Cultural Alliance	
United Democratic Party	
Gano Andolan	

== Dissolution and Dormancy ==
The alliance structurally collapsed during the 2026 election cycle after the Election Commission denied its leading faction the official Jatiya Party (E) plough symbol and disqualified its chairman Anisul Islam Mahmud from the ballot.

Following the election, the front fell into permanent dormancy as member parties chose to "retain their individual identity and ideology" and abandoned joint operations, leaving it a defunct entity while its fragmented leadership factions issued separate national statements strictly under their respective Jatiya Party banners rather than the NDF coalition name.

== See also ==
- 11 Party Alliance
- Grand Alliance (Bangladesh)
