= Atiqur Rahman Mujahid =

Bangladeshi politician

- আতিকুর রহমান মোজাহিদ
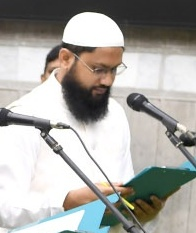
- Mujahid in 2026

Member of Parliament
- Incumbent
- Assumed office 17 February 2026
- Preceded by: Hamidul Haque Khandker
- Constituency: Kurigram-2

Personal details
- Born: 20 December 1992 (age 33) Tokraihat, Kurigram, Rangpur
- Party: National Citizen Party
- Spouse: Rifat Ara Rira
- Education: University of Dhaka (BA); International Islamic University Malaysia (MA), (PhD)
- Occupation: Politician, academic

Atiqur Rahman Mujahid (born 20 December 1992) is a Bangladeshi politician. He is a joint convener of the National Citizen Party. In the 13th Jatiya Sangsad Election, he was elected as a member of parliament from the Kurigram-2 constituency as a nominee of the National Citizen Party.

== Early life and education ==
Atiqur Rahman Mujahid was born on 20 December 1992 in Pathan Para, Togoraihat area of Kurigram District. His father is Amjad Hossain and his mother is Arjuna Begum. His spouse is Rifat Ara Rira.

He completed his undergraduate studies at the University of Dhaka. Later, on an international scholarship, he obtained his master's in history and civilisation and PhD degrees in political science from the International Islamic University Malaysia. His PhD dissertation focuses on Youth Development Modeling in Bangladesh. Before elected, He worked as a faculty member of two private universities in Dhaka.
