= Iqbal Hossain =

Bangladeshi politician (c.1950–2019)

- ইকবাল হোসেন

Member of Parliament for Munshiganj-2
- In office 15 April 1988 – 6 December 1990
- Preceded by: Md Korban Ali
- Succeeded by: Muhammad Hamidullah Khan

Personal details
- Born: c. 1950
- Died: 6 December 2019 (aged 69) Dhaka, Bangladesh
- Occupation: Politician

Iqbal Hossain (c. 1950 – 6 December 2019) was a Bangladeshi freedom fighter and politician from Munshiganj. He was a member of the Jatiya Sangsad representing the Munshiganj-2 constituency during 1988–1990.

== Biography ==
Hossain took part in the Liberation War of Bangladesh. He was the commander of Louhajong unit of Mujib Bahini in 1971. He also served as the vice chairman of Muktijoddha Sangsad. He was elected as a member of the Jatiya Sangsad from Munshiganj-2 in 1988.

Hossain died on 6 December 2019 in Apollo Hospital, Dhaka.
