= Tajul Islam Choudhury =

Bangladeshi diplomat and politician

Md. Tajul Islam Choudhury
- মোঃ তাজুল ইসলাম চৌধুরী

Member of the Bangladesh Parliament for Kurigram-2
- In office 29 January 2014 – 28 January 2019
- Preceded by: Zafar Ali
- Succeeded by: Ponir Uddin Ahmed
- In office 14 July 1996 – 27 October 2006
- Preceded by: Md. Umar Farooq
- In office 10 July 1986 – 24 November 1995
- Preceded by: Position created

Personal details
- Born: 31 October 1944
- Died: 13 August 2018 (aged 73) Dhaka, Bangladesh

Md. Tajul Islam Choudhury (31 October 1944 – 13 August 2018) was a Bangladeshi politician. He was elected as a member of parliament seven times from Kurigram-2 constituency. He also served as the opposition chief whip.
