= Kurigram-2 =

Constituency of Bangladesh's Jatiya Sangsad

Coordinates: 25.81°N 89.64°E

- Constituency for the Jatiya Sangsad
- District: Kurigram District
- Division: Rangpur Division
- Electorate: 604,738 (2026)

Current constituency
- Created: 1984
- Party: National Citizen Party
- Member: Atiqur Rahman Mujahid
- ← 25 Kurigram-1 27 Kurigram-3 →

Kurigram-2 is a constituency represented in the Jatiya Sangsad (National Parliament) of Bangladesh since 2026 by Atiqur Rahman Mujahid of the National Citizen Party.

== Boundaries ==
The constituency encompasses Kurigram Sadar, Phulbari, and Rajarhat upazilas.

== History ==
The constituency was created in 1984 from the Rangpur-14 constituency when the former Rangpur District was split into five districts: Nilphamari, Lalmonirhat, Rangpur, Kurigram, and Gaibandha.

Ahead of the 2008 general election, the Election Commission redrew constituency boundaries to reflect population changes revealed by the 2001 Bangladesh census. The 2008 redistricting altered the boundaries of the constituency.

Ahead of the 2014 general election, the Election Commission expanded the boundaries of the constituency. Previously it excluded four union parishads of Rajarhat Upazila: Bidyananda, Gharialdanga, Nazimkhan, and Omar Majid.

== Members of Parliament ==
Election	Member	Party
1986	Md. Tajul Islam Choudhury	Jatiya Party (Ershad)
Feb 1996	Md. Umar Farooq	Bangladesh Nationalist Party
Jun 1996	Md. Tajul Islam Choudhury	Jatiya Party (Ershad)
2001	Md. Tajul Islam Choudhury	Islami Jatiya Oikya Front
2008	Zafar Ali	Awami League
2014	Md. Tajul Islam Choudhury	Jatiya Party (Ershad)
2018	Ponir Uddin Ahmed	Jatiya Party (Ershad)
2024	Hamidul Haque Khandker	Independent
2026	Atiqur Rahman Mojahid	National Citizen Party

== Elections ==
=== Elections in the 2020s ===
General election 2026: Kurigram-2
Party	Candidate	Votes	%	±%
NCP	Atiqur Rahman Mujahid	178,869		
BNP	Md. Sohel Hossain Kaikobad	170,335		
Majority				
Turnout		400,585		
Registered electors		604,738		
NCP gain from Independent				

=== Elections in the 2010s ===
Md. Tajul Islam Choudhury was elected unopposed in the 2014 general election after opposition parties withdrew their candidacies in a boycott of the election.

=== Elections in the 2000s ===
Hussain Muhammad Ershad stood for three seats in the 2008 general election: Rangpur-3, Kurigram-2, and Dhaka-17. After winning all three, he chose to represent Dhaka-17 and quit the other two, triggering by-elections in them. Zafar Ali of the Awami League was elected in an April 2009 by-election.

Kurigram-2 by-election, 2009
Party	Candidate	Votes	%	±%
AL	Zafar Ali	140,748	65.9	N/A
JP(E)	Golam Habib Dulal	46,619	21.8	−50.9
IAB	Md. Mustafizur Rahaman	13,439	6.3	−2.2
BNP	Md. Tajul Islam Choudhury	12,915	6.0	−12.2
Majority		94,129	44.0	−10.6
Turnout		213,721	64.3	−22.4
AL gain from JP(E)				

General Election 2008: Kurigram-2
Party	Candidate	Votes	%	±%
JP(E)	Hossain Muhammad Ershad	209,505	72.7	N/A
BNP	Md. Tajul Islam Choudhury	52,374	18.2	+12.0
IAB	Md. Mustafizur Rahaman	24,372	8.5	N/A
BSD	Jahedul Haque Milu	971	0.3	N/A
LDP	Sultan Ahamed	605	0.2	N/A
BDB	Bhudeb Chakrabarti	259	0.1	N/A
Majority		157,131	54.6	+48.0
Turnout		288,032	86.7	+13.7
JP(E) gain from IJOF				

General Election 2001: Kurigram-2
Party	Candidate	Votes	%	±%
IJOF	Md. Tajul Islam Choudhury	123,886	49.9	N/A
AL	Amsaa Amin	107,398	43.3	+5.1
BNP	Md. Lutfar Rahman	15,508	6.2	−4.3
Bangladesh Samajtantrik Dal (Basad-Khalekuzzaman)	Jahedul Haque Milu	1,120	0.5	N/A
Independent	Md. Matiur Rahman	363	0.1	N/A
Majority		16,488	6.6	+1.8
Turnout		248,275	73.0	+0.4
IJOF gain from JP(E)				

=== Elections in the 1990s ===
General Election June 1996: Kurigram-2
Party	Candidate	Votes	%	±%
JP(E)	Md. Tajul Islam Choudhury	82,158	43.0	+0.8
AL	Zafar Ali	72,962	38.2	+6.6
BNP	AKM Maidul Islam	20,019	10.5	+3.9
Jamaat	A.N.M. Solaiman	7,719	4.0	−5.5
IOJ	Md. Abdul Gani	6,670	3.5	+0.2
Zaker Party	Md. Sirajul Islam	751	0.4	−0.5
Independent	A.M.M. Samsuddin Miah	353	0.2	N/A
Bangladesh Samajtantrik Dal (Khalekuzzaman)	Jahedul Haque Milu	305	0.2	−0.3
Gano Forum	Shri Sanalal Bakshi	173	0.1	N/A
Independent	Bhudev Chandra Chakrabarti	122	0.1	N/A
Majority		9,196	4.8	−5.8
Turnout		191,232	72.6	+22.1
JP(E) hold				

General Election 1991: Kurigram-2
Party	Candidate	Votes	%	±%
JP(E)	Md. Tajul Islam Choudhury	59,049	42.2	
AL	Zafar Ali	44,181	31.6	
Jamaat	Md. Sulaiman Ali	13,284	9.5	
BNP	Md. Abdus Salam	9,176	6.6	
IOJ	Md. Zakaria	4,646	3.3	
JSD	Md. Ansar Ali	3,000	2.1	
Bangladesh Janata Party	A. K. M. Shamsuddoha	2,720	1.9	
Zaker Party	Md. Karam Ali	1,258	0.9	
Independent	Md. Golam Morshed	741	0.5	
Bangladesh Samajtantrik Dal (Khalekuzzaman)	Shree Shudhangsu Chakraborty	722	0.5	
Jatiya Samajtantrik Dal-JSD	Md. Motlabbar Rahaman	431	0.3	
CPB	Md. Harun ur Rashid Lal	416	0.3	
Bangladesh Muslim League (Matin)	Syeda Gulrukh Mohol Shiraji	138	0.1	
Majority		14,868	10.6	
Turnout		139,762	50.5	
JP(E) hold				
