= Ponir Uddin Ahmed =

Bangladeshi politician

- পনির উদ্দিন আহমেদ

Member of 11th Jatiya Sangsad

Member of Parliament for Kurigram-2
- In office 3 January 2019 – 7 January 2024
- Preceded by: Tajul Islam Choudhury
- Succeeded by: Hamidul Haque Khandker

Personal details
- Born: 10 October 1957 (age 68) Kurigram
- Party: Jatiya Party (Ershad)
- Profession: Business
- Committees: Standing Committee on Ministry of Public Administration

Ponir Uddin Ahmed (Bengali: পনির উদ্দিন আহমেদ) is a Jatiya Party (Ershad) politicians and former Member of Parliament of Kurigram-2.

== Career ==
Ahmed was elected to parliament from Kurigram-2 as a Jatiya Party (Ershad) candidate 30 December 2018.
