= Aslam Hossain Saudagar =

Bangladeshi politician

- আছলাম হোসেন সওদাগর

Member of the Bangladesh Parliament for Kurigram-1
- In office 30 January 2019 – 29 January 2024
- Preceded by: A.K.M. Mostafizur Rahman
- Succeeded by: A.K.M. Mostafizur Rahman

Personal details
- Party: Awami League

Aslam Hossain Saudagar (Bengali: আছলাম হোসেন সওদাগর) is a Bangladeshi politician who was a member of the Bangladesh Parliament for Kurigram-1 from 2019 to 2024.

== Career ==
Saudagar was chairman of Nageshwari Upazila from 2009 to 2013.

He was elected to parliament on 30 December 2018 as a Bangladesh Awami League candidate for Kurigram-1. In December 2023, he withdrew his nomination for re-election in favor of coalition partner Jatiya Party candidate A.K.M. Mostafizur Rahman.
