= Mizanur Rahman Sinha =

Bangladeshi politician (1943–2026)

- মিজানুর রহমান সিনহা

State Minister of Health and Family Welfare
- In office 22 May 2003 – 29 October 2006
- Preceded by: Amanullah Aman
- Succeeded by: Mujibur Rahman Fakir

Member of Parliament for Munshiganj-2
- In office 14 July 1996 – 27 October 2006
- Preceded by: Muhammad Hamidullah Khan
- Succeeded by: Sagufta Yasmin Emily

Personal details
- Born: 18 August 1943
- Died: 16 May 2026 (aged 82) Singapore
- Party: Bangladesh Nationalist Party
- Education: University of Dhaka

Mizanur Rahman Sinha (18 August 1943 – 16 May 2026) was a Bangladesh Nationalist Party politician who was a Jatiya Sangsad member, representing the Munshiganj-2 constituency, and the managing director of The ACME Laboratories Ltd.

== Early life and education ==
Sinha was born on 18 August 1943. He completed an M.A. at the University of Dhaka.

== Career ==
Sinha became the managing director of The ACME Laboratories Ltd on 30 September 1995. He is the chairman of Sinha Knit and Denims Ltd, Sinha Knit Industries Ltd, Sinha Fabrics Limited, and the Sinha Wool Wears Limited. He was elected to Parliament in 1996 and in 2001 from Munshiganj-2 as a candidate of Bangladesh Nationalist Party. He served as the State Minister of Health and Family welfare. He also served as the State Minister of Textiles. On 1 April 2016 he was made treasurer of Bangladesh Nationalist Party.

== Death ==
Sinha died at a hospital in Singapore, on 16 May 2026, at the age of 82.
