= A.K.M. Shahidul Islam =

Bangladeshi politician

Member of Bangladesh Parliament

Personal details
- Party: Jatiya Party (Ershad)

A.K.M. Shahidul Islam is a Jatiya Party (Ershad) politician and a former member of parliament of Kurigram-1. He was also a member of the UNESCO World Heritage Center's 21st Session of the General Assembly of States' Parties, representing Bangladesh, in 2017. He was also at the time the research and liaison officer for the Bangladeshi Embassy in Paris, France.

== Career ==
Islam was elected to parliament from Kurigram-1 as a Jatiya Party candidate in 1986 and 1988.
