= A.K.M. Mostafizur Rahman =

Bangladeshi politician

- এ, কে, এম মোস্তাফিজুর রহমান

Member of Parliament for Kurigram-1
- In office 14 July 1996 – 28 January 2019
- Preceded by: A.K.M. Shahidul Islam
- Succeeded by: Aslam Hossain Saudagar

Personal details
- Born: 3 January 1961 (age 64)
- Party: Jatiya Party

A.K.M. Mostafizur Rahman (born 3 January 1961) is a Jatiya Party politician and a former Jatiya Sangsad member representing the Kurigram-1 constituency.

== Early life ==
Mostafizur Rahman was born on 3 January 1961. He has an H.S.C. degree.

== Career ==
Mostafizur Rahman was elected to parliament as a Jatiya Party candidate in 1996, 2001, 2008, and 2014 from Kurigram-1.
