= Md Zakir Hossain =

Bangladeshi politician

- জাকির হোসেন
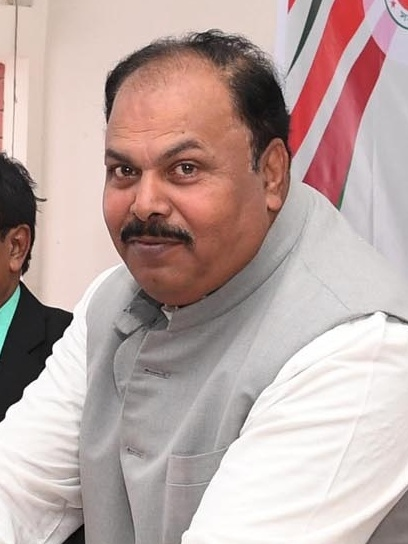
- Hossain in 2019

Minister of State for Primary and Mass Education
- In office 7 January 2019 – 10 January 2024
- Prime Minister: Sheikh Hasina
- Preceded by: Mostafizur Rahman
- Succeeded by: Rumana Ali

Member of the Bangladesh Parliament for Kurigram-4
- In office 3 January 2019 – 7 January 2024
- Preceded by: Ruhul Amin

Personal details
- Born: 2 July 1966 (age 59)
- Party: Bangladesh Awami League

Md Zakir Hossain (born 2 July 1966) is a Bangladesh Awami League politician and former Jatiya Sangsad member representing the Kurigram-4 constituency. He is a former state minister of Primary and Mass Education.

== Career ==
Hossain was elected to the parliament on 30 December 2018 from Kurigram-4 as a Bangladesh Awami League candidate. He was appointed the state minister of primary and mass education in the fourth Hasina cabinet.

On 26 November 2023, the Awami League announced the final list of its 298 candidates to contest the 2024 national election, which did not include Hossain.
