= Abdul Bari Sarkar =

Bangladeshi politician

- অবদুল বারী সরকার

Member of Parliament from Kurigram-4
- In office 15 February 1996 – 12 June 1996
- Preceded by: Golam Hossain
- Succeeded by: Golam Hossain

Personal details
- Born: Kurigram District
- Party: Bangladesh Nationalist Party

Abdul Bari Sarkar is a politician from Kurigram District of Bangladesh and a former member of parliament for the Kurigram-4 constituency.

== Career ==
Sarkar is the president of the Chilmari Upazila unit of the Bangladesh Nationalist Party. He was elected to parliament from Kurigram-4 as a Bangladesh Nationalist Party candidate in the 15 February 1996 Bangladeshi general election. He was defeated in the 7th Jatiya Sangsad elections on 12 June 1996 as a candidate of Bangladesh Nationalist Party from Kurigram-4 constituency.
