= Taramon Bibi =

Bangladeshi freedom fighter

Taramon Bibi Bir Protik
- তারামন বিবি
- Born: c. 1956; Shankar Madhabpur, Kurigram, East Pakistan, Pakistan
- Died: 1 December 2018 (aged 62); Char Rajibpur Upazila, Kurigram, Bangladesh
- Military career
- Allegiance: Bangladesh
- Alliance: Mukti Bahini
- Service year: 1971
- Conflicts: Bangladesh Liberation War
- Awards: Bir Protik

Taramon Bibi Bir Protik (c. 1956 – 1 December 2018) was one of the two female freedom fighters in Bangladesh to obtain the Bir Protik award. She engaged in direct combat during the liberation war of Bangladesh in 1971 as a member of the Mukti Bahini (Liberation Army), which was a guerrilla force that fought against the Pakistani military.

== Biography ==
Bibi was born in Shankar Madhabpur village, Kurigram District, to Abdus Sobhan and Kulsum Bewa. She was hired by the Mukti Bahini to help cook and clean the camp when she was 16. She was interested in the war effort and asked Havildar Muhit, in the infantry regiment of Sector 11, to train her. He trained her on the usage of the .303 British rifle and submachine guns. She was in Sector 11 under the leadership of sector commander Abu Taher.

Taramon Bibi died at her residence at Char Rajibpur Upazila, Kurigram, at 1:30am on 1 December 2018.

== Award ==
After the war, she was awarded Bir Protik (Symbol of Valour) by the Bangladesh government in 1973. But her whereabouts were unknown, and the award was never handed over to her. She herself remained unaware of this until 1995, when a researcher from Mymensingh discovered her. She was finally given her award by then Prime Minister of Bangladesh Khaleda Zia on 19 December 1995.

== Personal life ==
Bibi was married to Abdul Majid. Together they had a son, Abu Taher, and a daughter.

== Death ==
She died in Kurigram, Bangladesh, at the age of 62.

== Legacy ==
She was a fighter of the Mukti Bahini during the Independence War in 1971.
