= Zafar Ali (politician) =

Bangladeshi politician

Member of Parliament

Personal details
- Party: Bangladesh Awami League

Zafar Ali is a Bangladesh Awami League politician and the former Member of Parliament from Kurigram-2.

== Career ==
Ali was elected to Parliament in 2009 from Kurigram-2 as a Bangladesh Awami League candidate in a by election. The by-election was called after Hussain Muhammad Ershad resigned. Ershad had won the election from Rangpur-3, Kurigram-2, and Dhaka-17 in 2008 Bangladesh General election and he choose to represent Dhaka-17.
