= Muhammad Hamidullah Khan =

Bangladeshi military officer and politician (1938–2011)

M. Hamidullah Khan TJ BP

Member of Parliament for Munshiganj-2
- In office 1991–1996
- Preceded by: Iqbal Hossain
- Succeeded by: Mizanur Rahman Sinha

Personal details
- Born: 11 September 1938 Bikrampur, Bengal, British India (present day Munshiganj, Dhaka, Bangladesh)
- Died: 30 December 2011 (aged 73) CMH, Dhaka, Bangladesh
- Awards: Bir Protik; Tamgha-e-Jurat

Military service
- Allegiance: Bangladesh; Pakistan (before 1971)
- Branch/service: Bangladesh Air Force; Pakistan Air Force
- Years of service: 1962-1978
- Rank: Wing commander
- Unit: No.24 Squadron, GD(Admin.)
- Commands: Commander of the Sector - IX; Provost Marshal of Air Headquarters; ACAS(Administration) of Air Headquarters; Director Martial Law Communication and Control Center; AOC of BAF Base Dhaka
- Battles/wars: Indo-Pakistan War of 1965; Bangladesh Independence War

Muhammad Hamidullah Khan, TJ, BP (Bengali: এম হামিদুল্লাহ খান; 11 September 1938 – 30 December 2011) was a military leader and a war hero in two wars fought in South Asia: the Indo-Pakistani War of 1965 and the Bangladesh War of Independence in 1971. Hamidullah was elected member of parliament three times: in 1979, 1996, and 1996. Hamidullah held a number of public offices as chairman, such as Sonali Bank, Freedom Fighters Welfare Trust, Security & Exchange Commission, and Board of Investment.

== Early life and education ==
Wing Commander Hamidullah Khan was born on 11 September 1938 in Medini Mandal village, Lohajang upazila, Bikrampur. He passed his matriculation from Kazir Pagla A.T. Institution in 1954. He completed his Intermediate and Bachelor of Commerce degree from Jagannath College in 1956 and 1959, respectively. In 1960, he joined the Pakistan Air Force Academy (PAFAA) as a cadet.

== Career ==
Khan joined the Pakistan Air Force Academy as a cadet of the 34th GD pilot course in 1960. He gained a commission in 1962. During the 1965 Indo-Pakistan War, Hamidullah was awarded the Tamgha-i-Jurat Gallantry Medal for his courage and the Sitara-e-Harb War Medal for his dedication in the September 1965 Pathankot infiltration. In 1970, he was posted to Dhaka as the assistant provost marshal of PAF. As flight lieutenant, he also served as the commanding officer of 5th P & S and the deputy director (Security) of Tejgaon International Airport in the Pakistan Air Force. In the Bangladesh Independence War in 1971, he planned and commanded the Chilmari riverborne amphibious raid, one of the most strategically significant ground combat operations that was fought during the War of Independence of Bangladesh within the Mankachar sub~sector boundary of BDF Sector 11. Major Shafaat Jamil augmented the operation with two platoons from the 3rd East Bengal Regiment

During the war in 1971, Squadron Leader Hamidullah held three appointments. As an official of the Bangladesh Government, M. Hamidullah Khan was the principal BDF representative of guerilla training at Chakulia, Bihar. After participating in the Sector Commanders Conference held between July 11~17th 1971, BDF C-in-C Colonel M. A. G. Osmani transferred Hamidullah to Teldhala, BDF Sector 11 HQ. During that time, he received a battlefield promotion to squadron leader. Bangladesh Forces Sector 11 headquarters was under the command of BDF commander Lt. Col. Ziaur Rahman, who appointed Hamidullah BDF commander of Mankachar Sub-Sector 1, with additional charge of independent Roumari district. He was promoted to the rank of squadron leader during the Bangladesh War of Independence. On 3 November 1971, Squadron Leader M. Hamidullah Khan was appointed BDF commander of Sector 11..

After the independence of Bangladesh, he joined the Bangladesh Air Force from the Bangladesh Forces. In 1973 Hamidullah was promoted to the rank of wing commander. He retired voluntarily on January 10, 1979. Hamidullah was provost marshall during the 7 November 1975 Nationalist Revolution and the 1977 BAF uprising and hijacked JAL flt. 472.

Hamidullah was the Bangladesh representative during the 34th United Nations General Assembly session in 1979 as Bangladesh's special envoy on the question of granting recognition to the State of Palestine and the plenary session on UN Resolutions 242 and 439 on the question of Palestine and Namibia, respectively. He held numerous public appointments and elected posts during his service to the country. He joined the Bangladesh Nationalist Party in 1978, contested the Jatiya Sangsad elections, and was elected lawmaker three times in 1979, 1991, and 1996 from the Louhaganj-Shirajdi Khan constituency. He was also nominated for the Dhaka-15 constituency in the 2008 election.

After his death, M. Hamidullah Khan was given a state funeral with full military honors.

He also authored four more books and made two documentaries on the events surrounding the war and post-independence. The Bangladesh government named Road 23 in the town of Banani, Dhaka, after him. Along with those of 55 other fighters, his biography was included in a CD released by the Bangladesh government.

== Death ==
M. Hamidullah Khan was given a state funeral with a military guard of honour. Hamidullah Khan and his wife, Rabeya Sultana Khan, had two sons, Murad Hamid Khan (Sonny) and Tariq Hamid Khan (Konny).
