= Md. Mostafizur Rahman (Kurigram politician) =

Bangladeshi politician

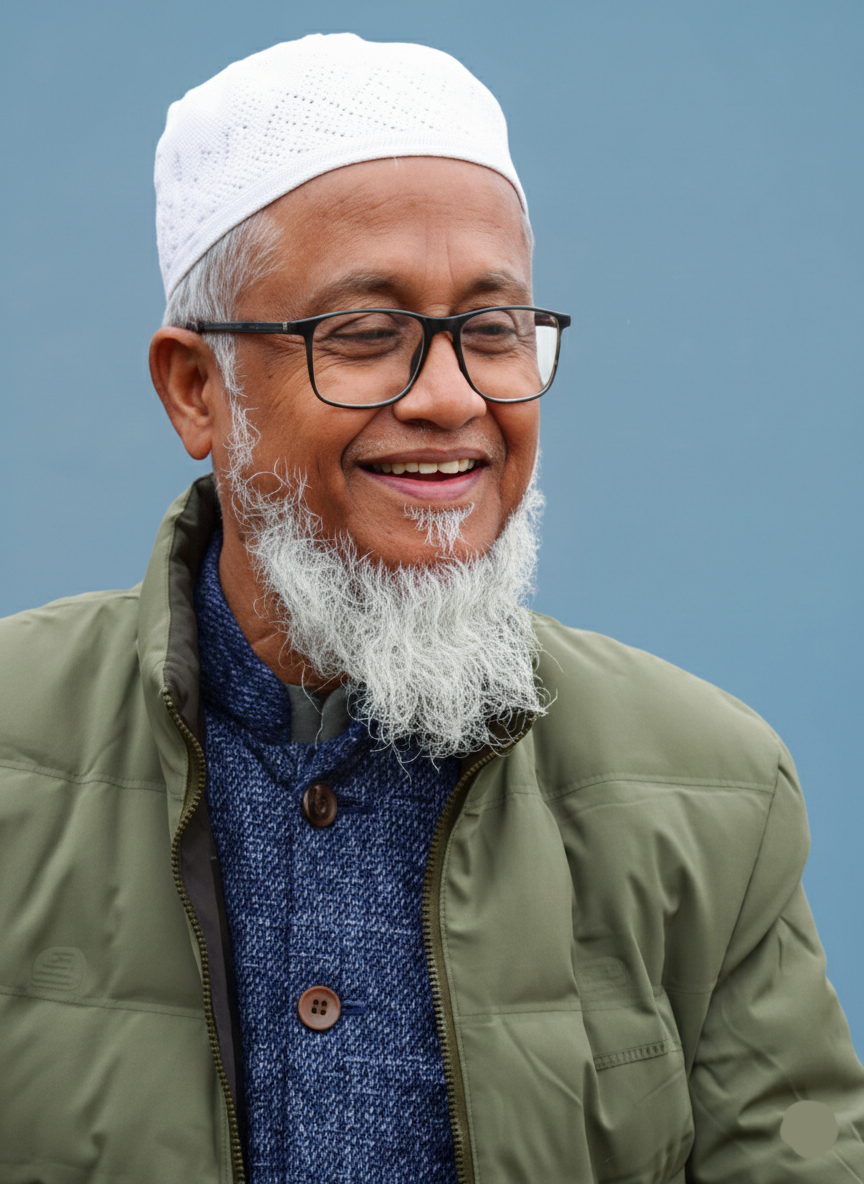

Member of the Bangladesh Parliament for Kurigram-4
- Incumbent
- Assumed office 17 February 2026
- Preceded by: Md. Biplab Hasan

Personal details
- Party: Bangladesh Jamaat-e-Islami
- Occupation: Politician

Md. Mostafizur Rahman is a Bangladeshi politician affiliated with Bangladesh Jamaat-e-Islami. He is a current Member of Parliament from the Kurigram-4.
