= Mohammad Sadakat Hossain =

Bangladeshi politician

- মোহাম্মদ সাদাকাত হোসেন

Member of Parliament from Undivided Rangpur-17 (now Kurigram-4)
- In office 1973–1975

Personal details
- Born: Kurigram District
- Party: Bangladesh Awami League
- Nickname: Chakku Mian

Mohammad Sadakat Hossain, also known as Chakku Mian, was a politician of Kurigram district of Bangladesh, Freedom fighter and former Member of Parliament for undivided Rangpur-17 (now Kurigram-4) constituency in 1973. He was an organizer of the Liberation War of Bangladesh.

== Career ==
He stood as an Awami League candidate in the 1970 Pakistani general election, and was elected Member of the National Assembly (MNA) for constituency Rangpur-III.

Hossain was a freedom fighter and an organizer of the Bangladesh Liberation War. He was the president of Chilmari Thana of Bangladesh Awami League and the headmaster of Chilmari High School.

After independence, he was elected to parliament from Rangpur-17 (now Kurigram-4) as an Awami League candidate in the 1973 Bangladeshi general election. In the 1991 Bangladeshi general election, Hossain stood, unsuccessfully, for Kurigram-4 as an independent candidate.
