= Najimuddaula =

Bangladeshi politician

Member of Bangladesh Parliament

Personal details
- Party: Jatiya Party (Ershad)

Najimuddaula is a Jatiya Party (Ershad) politician and a former member of parliament for Kurigram-4 in Bangladesh.

== Career ==
Najimuddaula was elected to parliament from Kurigram-4 as a Jatiya Party candidate in 1986 and 1988.
