= Jatiya Party (Manju) =

Bangladeshi political party

Jatiya Party-JP জাতীয় পার্টি - জেপি
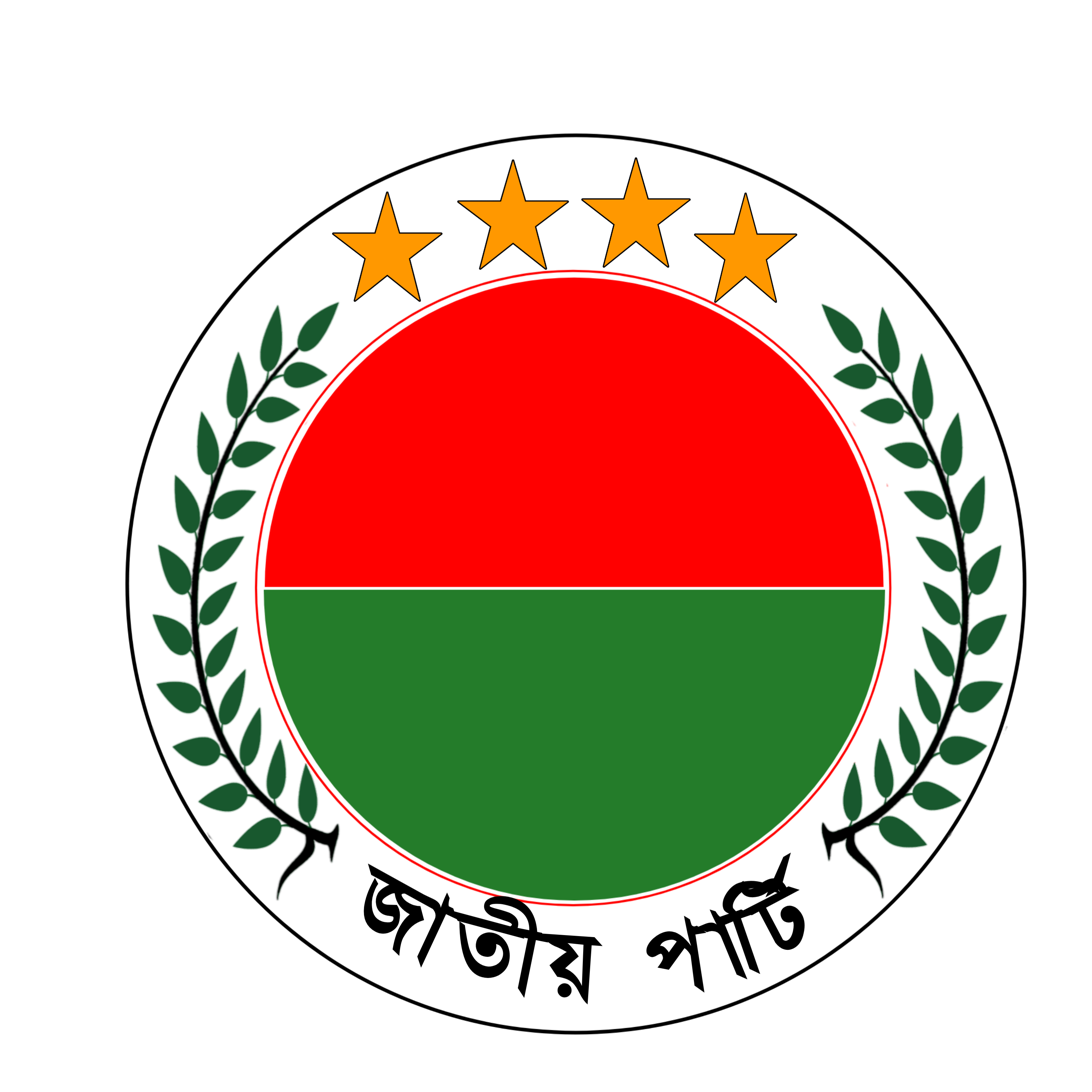
- Chairman: Anwar Hossain Manju
- Secretary-General: Sheikh Shahidul Islam
- Split from: Jatiya Party (Ershad)
- Headquarters: 3/6, Block-A, Lalmatia, Mohammadpur, Dhaka
- Ideology: Bangladeshi nationalism
- National affiliation: National Democratic Front
- Bangladesh Parliament: 0 / 350

Party flag
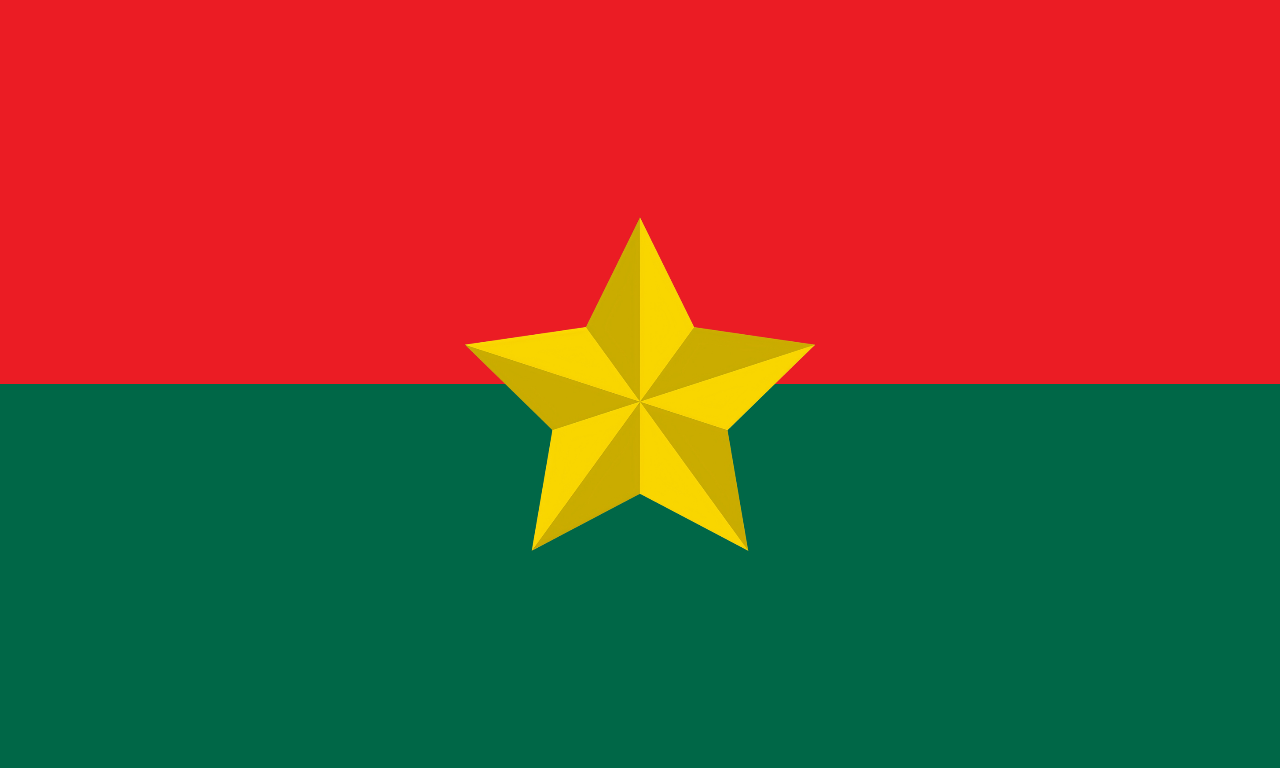

The Jatiya Party (Manju) (Bengali: জাতীয় পার্টি (মঞ্জু)) is a political party in Bangladesh, led by Anwar Hossain Manju. It is a splinter group of the original Jatiya Party, that was founded by military ruler Hussain Muhammad Ershad. The Manju faction broke away from the original Jatiya Party in 1999 when Anwar Hossain Manju refused to leave the First Hasina ministry and follow party leader Ershad in an alliance with the Bangladesh Nationalist Party.

The party is registered with the Election Commission of Bangladesh as Jatiya Party-JP.

The party has only been a minor force in Bangladeshi politics, allied to the Awami League. It lost its parliamentary representation in 2008, re-entering parliament only after the 2014 Bangladeshi general election. The 2014 election was boycotted by the main opposition coalition around the Bangladesh Nationalist party. For the first time in its existence the Jatiya Party (Manju) returned two members of parliament: Party Chairman Manju was elected unopposed in Pirojpur-2, while Ruhul Amin won in Kurigram-4. The party joined the third Hasina ministry in 2014, with Anwar Hosain Manju being named Minister of Environment and Forest. The party lost its parliamentary representation again in 2024.

After the July Revolution that toppled the Awami League government, party chairman Anwar Manju was detained for a short time. The party opposed the interim Yunus ministry. Leaders of the Students Against Discrimination movement asked the Supreme Court of Bangladesh to ban the party for its support of the toppled government, but the petition was rejected, allowing the party to continue operating.

To compete in the 2026 Bangladeshi general election the party created the National Democratic Front together with the Jatiya Party (Ershad).

== Election results ==
=== Jatiya Sangsad elections ===
Election	Party leader	Votes	%	Seats	+/–	Position	Government
2001	Anwar Hossain Manju	243,617	0.44%	1 / 300	New	▲8th	Opposition
2008	Anwar Hossain Manju	7,818	0.01%	0 / 300	▼1	▼29th	Extra-parliamentary
2014	Anwar Hossain Manju	124,389	0.73	2 / 300	▲2	▲6th	Coalition
2018	Anwar Hossain Manju	182,611	0.21%	1 / 300	▼1	▼10th	Coalition
2024	Anwar Hossain Manju	1,540	0.02%	0 / 300	▼1	▼8th	Extra-parliamentary
