= Golam Habib Dulal =

Bangladeshi politician

Member of Bangladesh Parliament, Former Chief Conservator of Forests (CCF)

Personal details
- Born: Chilmari, Kurigram
- Party: Jatiya Party (Ershad)

Golam Habib Dulal is a Jatiya Party politician and a former member of parliament for Kurigram-4.

== Career ==
Dulal was elected to parliament from Kurigram-4 as a Jatiya Party candidate in 2001.
