= Ruhul Amin (Kurigram politician) =

Bangladeshi politician

Member of Parliament

Personal details
- Party: Jatiya Party

Md Ruhul Amin (Bengali: মোঃ রুহুল আমিন; born 1956) is a Bangladeshi politician and was a Member of Parliament from Kurigram-4 on 10th parliament.

== Early life ==
Amin was born on 11 February 1956. He studied up to S.S.C. or grade ten.

== Career ==
Amin was elected to Parliament from Kurigram-4 as a Jatiya Party candidate in 2014 and served till 2018.
