= Char Rajibpur Upazila =

Upazila in Kurigram district

Char Rajibpur চর রাজিবপুর
- Upazila
- Rajibpur
- Rajibpur Thana

- Coordinates: 25°24′N 89°41.5′E
- Country: Bangladesh
- Division: Rangpur
- District: Kurigram
- Establishment: 1983

Area
  - Total: 111.03 km^{2} (42.87 sq mi)

Population (2022)
  - Total: 78,383
  - Density: 705.96/km^{2} (1,828.4/sq mi)
- Time zone: UTC+6 (BST)
- Postal code: 5650
- Website: charrajibpur.kurigram.gov.bd

Char Rajibpur Upazila mauza geocode map

Char Rajibpur (Bengali: চর রাজিবপুর) is an upazila of Kurigram District in the Division of Rangpur, Bangladesh.

== Geography ==
Char Rajibpur is located at 25.4000°N 89.6917°E. It has 17,310 households and a total area 111.03 km^{2}.

== Demographics ==
Religions in Char Rajibpur Upazila (2022)
Religion	Percent
Islam	99.49%
Hinduism	0.50%
Other or not stated	0.01%

According to the 2022 Bangladeshi census, Char Rajibpur Upazila had 19,398 households and a population of 78,383. 10.91% of the population were under 5 years of age. Char Rajibpur had a literacy rate (age 7 and over) of 61.39%: 62.87% for males and 59.99% for females, and a sex ratio of 95.94 males for every 100 females. 37,443 (47.77%) lived in urban areas.

According to the 2011 Census of Bangladesh, Char Rajibpur Upazila had 17,310 households and a population of 73,373. 20,456 (27.88%) were under 10 years of age. Char Rajibpur had a literacy rate (age 7 and over) of 36.53%, compared to the national average of 51.8%, and a sex ratio of 1074 females per 1000 males. 14,697 (20.03%) lived in urban areas.

As of the 1991 Census of Bangladesh, Char Rajibpur has a population of 58,049. Males constitute are 49.54% of the population, and females 50.46%. This Upazila's eighteen up population is 27,533. Char Rajibpur has an average literacy rate of 16.4% (7+ years), and the national average of 32.4% literate.

According to the 11th National Assembly elections, Rajibpur upazila has a total of 54 thousand 79 voters. Among them there are 26 thousand 535 male voters and 27 thousand 544 female voters

== Administration ==
Char Rajibpur Upazila is divided into three union parishads: Rajibpur, Kodalkati, and Mohongonj. The union parishads are subdivided into 26 mauzas and 99 villages.

== Religious Institutions ==
- Mosques: 125
- Temple: 1
- Church: None

== Communication ==
There are 20 kilometers of paved roads and 150 kilometers of unpaved roads; the waterways cover 14 nautical miles. Alongside sailboats and horse-drawn carriages, all types of modern vehicles operate here.

== Health ==
There is one Upazila Health Complex, one Family Planning Center, one Tuberculosis and Leprosy Treatment Center, and one Veterinary Hospital.

== Tourist attractions ==
One-third of the upazila is riverine, with scenic riverside villages and island-like sandbars enhanced by kans grass. It has one of Bangladesh’s two river police stations. The Paharia River partly marks the border with India. Rajibpur also hosts Bangladesh’s first border haat at Bholarhat–Kalairchar.

== Famous People ==
Taramon Bibi (She fought in Sector 11 during the 1971 Liberation War, and the Government of Bangladesh awarded him the title of Bir Protik)

== See also ==
- Upazilas of Bangladesh
- Districts of Bangladesh
- Divisions of Bangladesh
