= Kurigram District =

District of Rangpur Division in Bangladesh

Kurigram District কুড়িগ্রাম জেলা
- District of Bangladesh
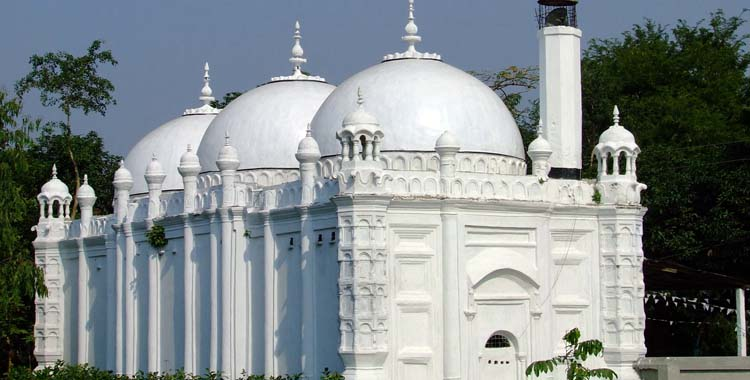
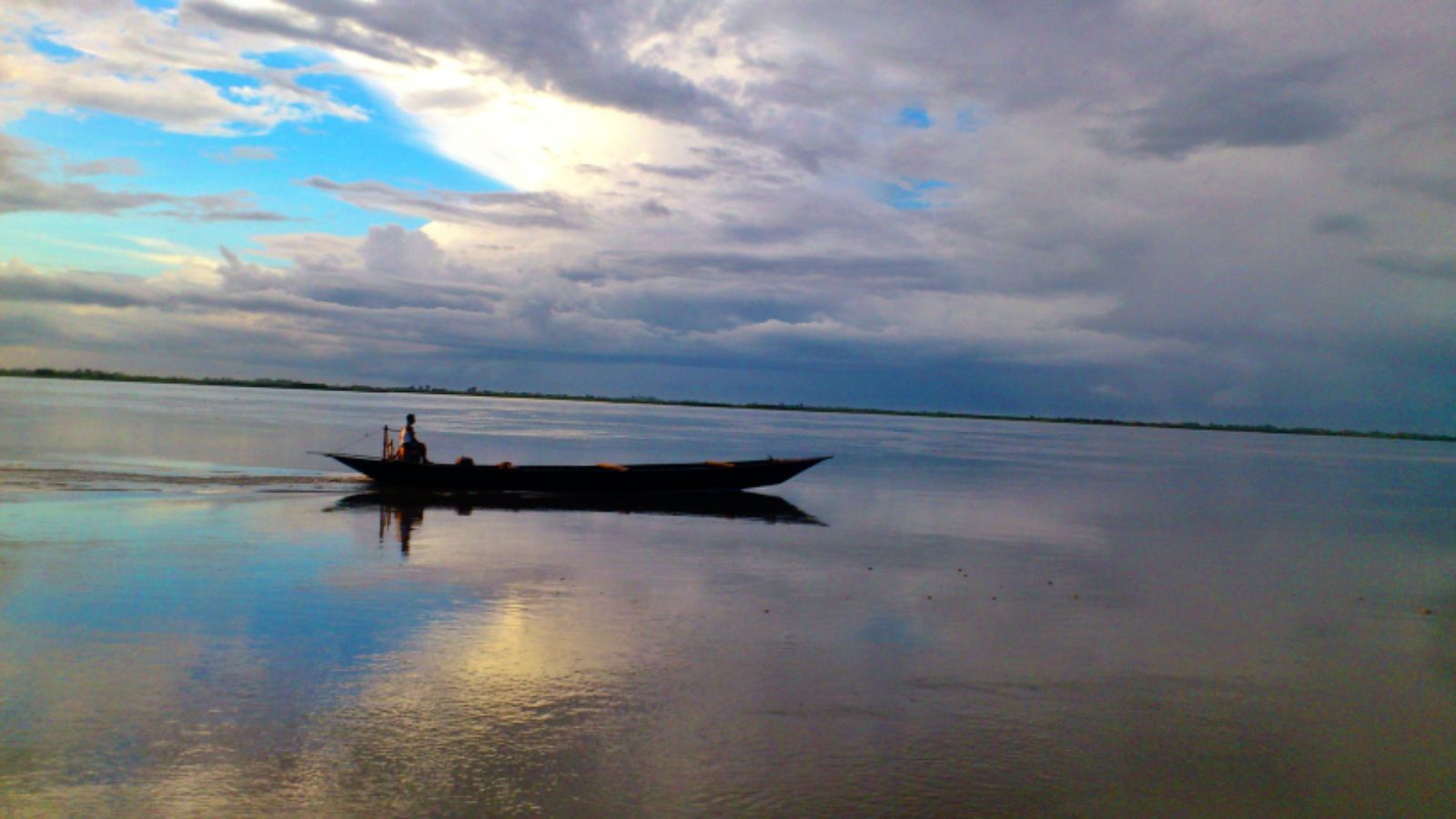
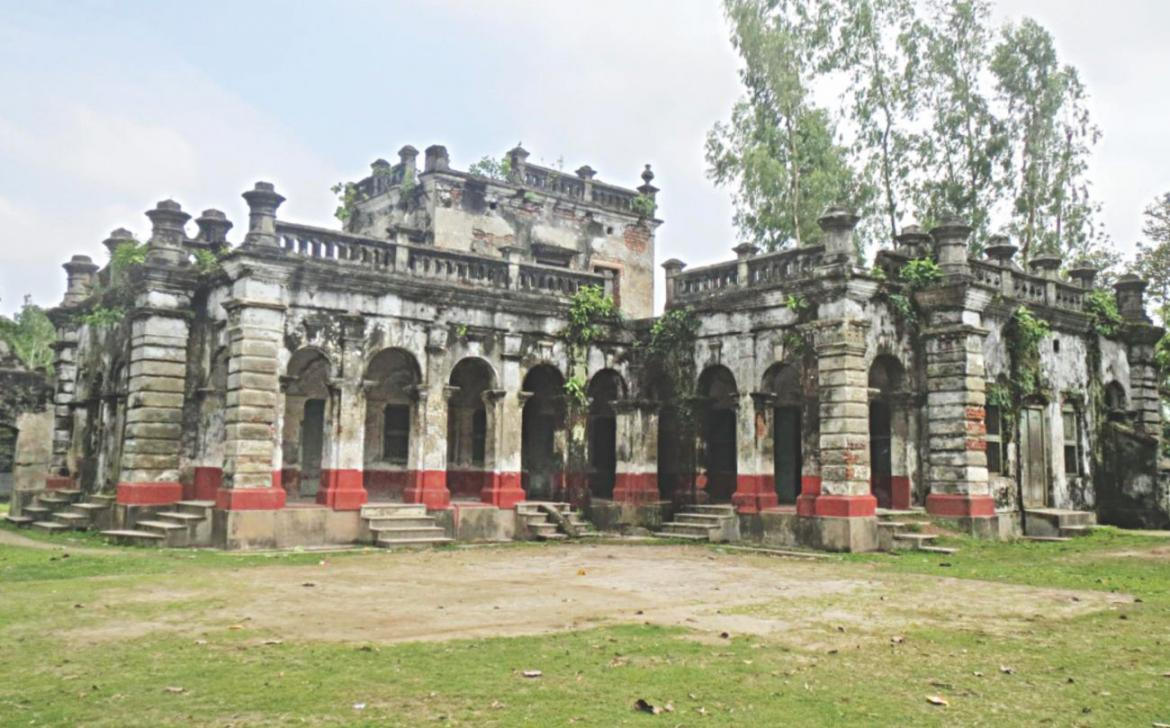
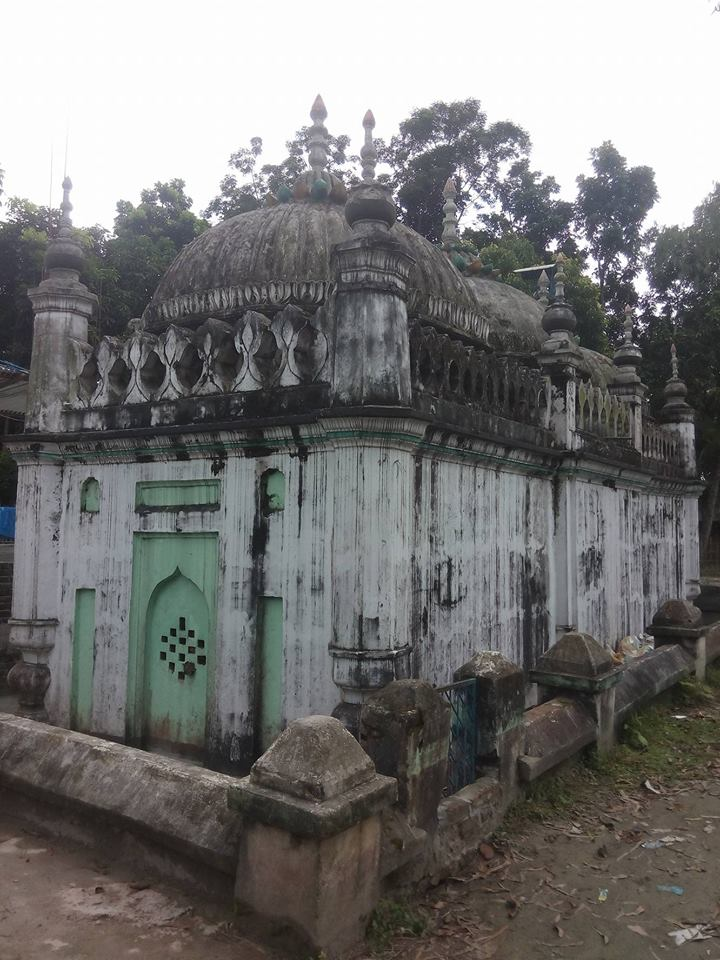
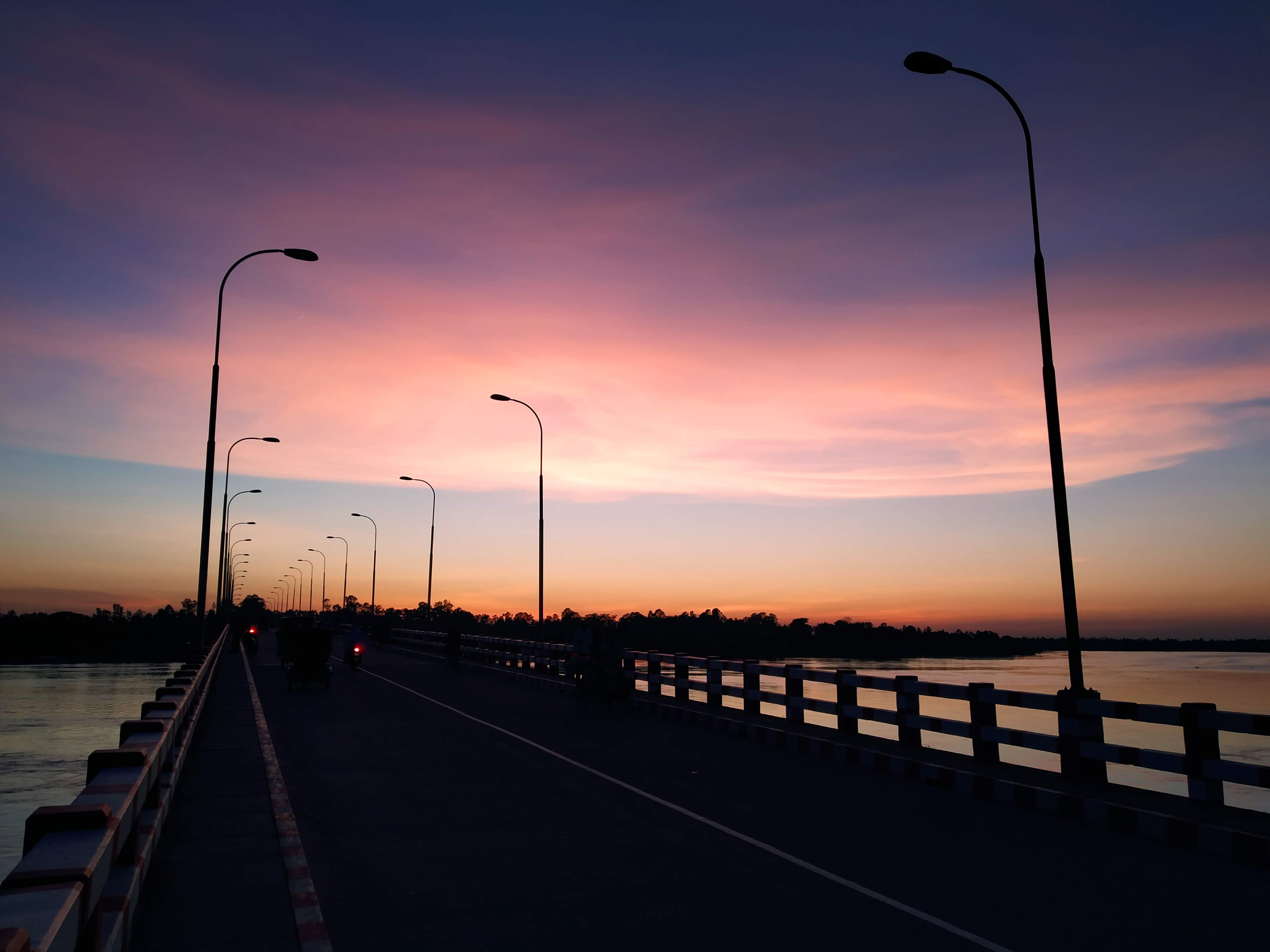
- Chandamari Mosque Jamuna River Ulipur Munshibari Mekurtari Shahi Mosque Dharla Bridge

- Location of Kurigram District in Bangladesh
- Interactive map of Kurigram District
- Coordinates: 25.75°N 89.66°E
- Country: Bangladesh
- Division: Rangpur Division
- Established: 1 February 1984
- Headquarters: Kurigram

Government
  - Deputy Commissioner: Md Rezaul Karim

Area
  - Total: 2,245.04 km^{2} (866.81 sq mi)

Population (2022)
  - Total: 2,329,160
  - Density: 1,037.47/km^{2} (2,687.03/sq mi)
- Time zone: UTC+06:00 (BST)
- Postal code: 5600
- Area code: 0581
- ISO 3166 code: BD-28
- HDI (2018): 0.591 medium · 15th of 21
- Website: kurigram.gov.bd

Kurigram District (Bengali: কুড়িগ্রাম জেলা) is a district of Bangladesh in Rangpur Division. The district is located in northern Bangladesh along the country's border with India. Under British rule, the area was organized as a mahakuma and was not established as a district until 1984 under Chief Martial Law Administrator, Hussain Muhammad Ershad's decentralization programme.

== Etymology ==
The name "Kurigram" is derived from the words Kuri and Gram. Kuri means "twenty" and Gram means "village" in Kol, a Munda language formerly spoken in the district.

== History ==
The region has historically been viewed as a part of Gaurabardhan (today Mahasthangarh) or Kamrup (today Assam). When the Kamrup kingdom was divided into many small kingdoms, the northern half of the Kurigram was controlled by the new polity Cooch Behar, while the southern half became a part of the Uari kingdom.

At the beginning of the 12th century, the Khen dynasty emerged as a power in the area of Kurigram, led by such kings as Chakradhwaj and Nilambor. The capital of this new dynasty was located in Chatra, today found in the Ulipur upazila. In 1418, Hosen Shah, the Sultan of Gouro, attacked and defeated Nilambar. Nilambar was killed in battle and the area fell under the control of Muslims, eventually becoming a part of the Mughal Empire.

When the British regime took control over India, Hare Ram and Debi Sing, a broker of the East India Company, were placed in charge of the area as dewans (controllers). In 1770, the mismanagement of the East India Company caused the Great Bengal famine, leading to numerous rebellions led by native Kurigramis. At that time, Kurigram was not one administrative unit, but was split up into the districts of Borobari, Ulipur, Chimari, and Nageshwari.

On 22 April 1875, the British government established the Kurigram mahakuma under the name "Kuriganj". It consisted of eight thanas called Kurigram, Lalmonirhat, Ulipur, Chilmari, Roumari, Nageshwar, Bhurungamari, and Pulbari. It was established as a district on 1 February 1984 and today consists of nine upazilas.

== Geography ==
Kurigram District is located in the northern region of Bangladesh along the border with India. The district is bordered by Jamalpur district of Mymensingh division to the south, Gaibandha, Rangpur and Lalmonirhat districts as well as West Bengal state of India to the west, and the Indian states of Assam and Meghalaya to the east. In total, the district has 278.28 kilometers of international border with India. The district consists of 9 upazilas, 72 unions, and 1,872 villages.

The climate of the district is higher in the summer and lower in the winter compared to other parts of Bangladesh. The average maximum temperature is around 32–33 degrees Celsius and the average minimum temperature is around 5–10 degrees Celsius. Like other parts of Bangladesh, the district experiences heavy rainfall during the rainy season, and the average annual rainfall is about 3,000 millimetres (120 in).

Several rivers flow through the center of Kurigram. The major rivers are the Brahmaputra (now called the Jamuna), Dharla, and Teesta. Minor rivers include the Dudhkumar, Phulkuar, Gangadhar, Jinjiram, and others. The three northern upazilas of the district were recently connected to the southern upazilas by a bridge over the Dharla river.

== Demographics ==
Historical population
Year	Pop.	±% p.a.
1974	1,117,434	—
1981	1,307,824	+2.27%
1991	1,603,034	+2.06%
2001	1,792,073	+1.12%
2011	2,069,073	+1.45%
2022	2,329,160	+1.08%

According to the 2022 Census of Bangladesh, Kurigram District had 605,722 households and a population of 2,329,160, of whom, 21.73% of the inhabitants lived in urban areas. 18.67% of the population was under 10 years of age. The population density was 1,037 people per km^{2}. The literacy rate (age 7 and over) was 65.13%, compared to the national average of 74.80% and the sex ratio was 96.84 males per 100 females. The ethnic population was 275.

=== Religion ===
Religions in Kurigram District (2022)
Religion	Percent
Muslims	93.82%
Hindus	6.16%
Other or not stated	0.02%

Religion in present-day Kurigram District
Religion	1941 (Note: 1941 figures are for Kurigaon subdivision of Rangpur district excluding Lalmonirhat thana.)		1981		1991		2001		2011		2022	
Religion	Pop.	%	Pop.	%	Pop.	%	Pop.	%	Pop.	%	Pop.	%
Islam	433,514	77.24%	1,198,500	91.64%	1,469,161	91.65%	1,666,880	93.01%	1,932,779	93.41%	2,185,248	93.82%
Hinduism	127,035	22.63%	107,976	8.26%	123,446	7.70%	123,627	6.90%	135,484	6.55%	143,381	6.16%
Others (Note: Including Jainism, Christianity, Buddhism, Zoroastrianism, Judaism, Ad-Dharmis, or not stated)	697	0.12%	348	0.10%	10,427	0.65%	1,566	0.09%	810	0.04%	531	0.02%
Total Population	561,246	100%	1,307,824	100%	1,603,034	100%	1,792,073	100%	2,069,073	100%	2,329,160	100%

Muslims are the majority with 92.82% while Hindus are 6.16%. The Hindu population has fallen in percentage from 6.55% to 6.16% from 2011 to 2022.

== Subdivision ==
Kurigram District upazila geocode map

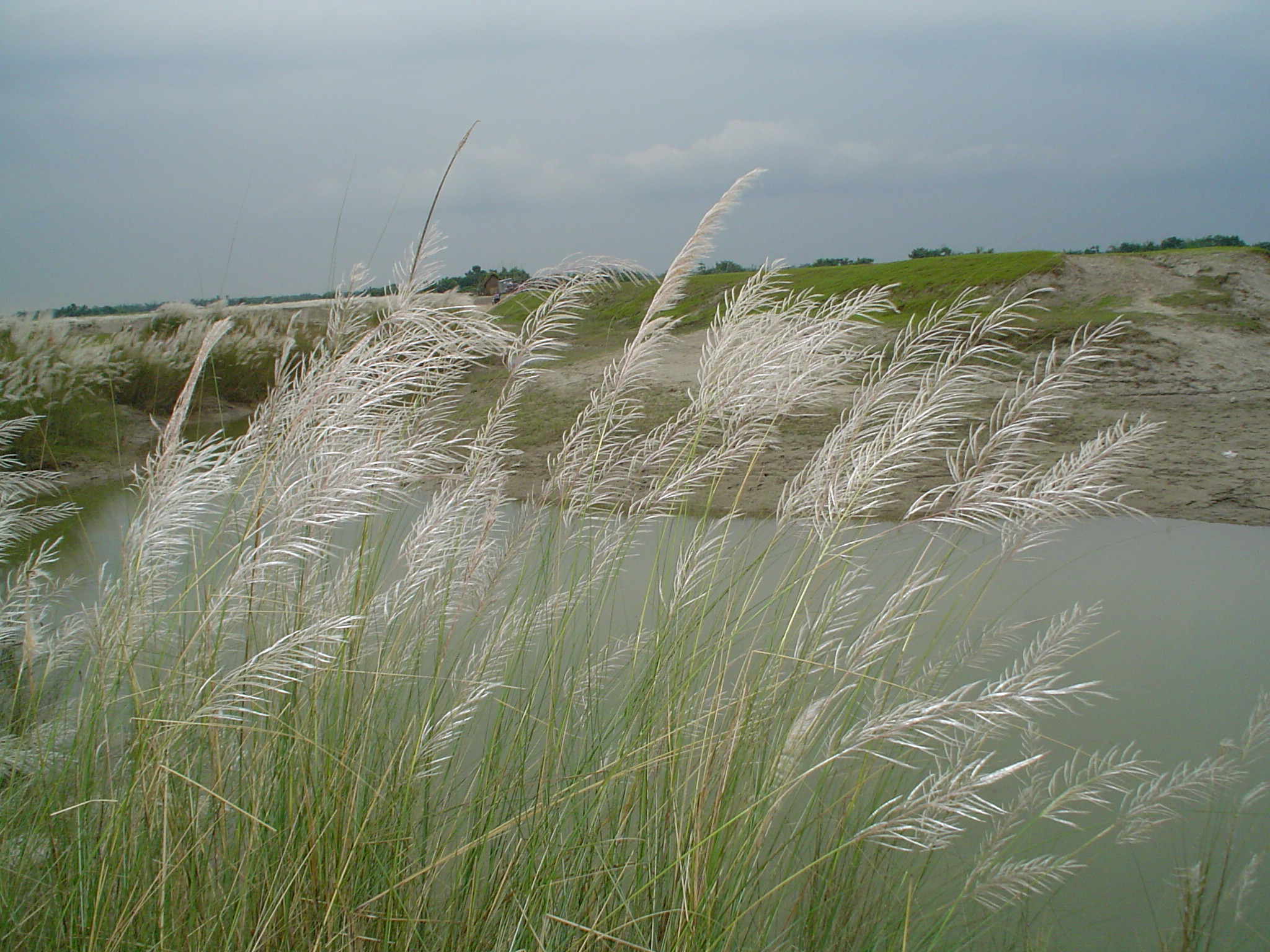
View of the Dharla River in Kurigram.

Kurigram District is divided into nine upazilas (subdistricts):

- Bhurungamari Upazila: northernmost subdistrict, easily connected with the other two northern subdistricts. Shares a border with India.
- Char Rajibpur Upazila: island subdistrict in the south of Kurigram. Only accessible via water transport.
- Chilmari Upazila: subdistrict found on the banks of the central rivers. The subdistrict is an important port and economic hub.
- Kurigram Sadar Upazila: central subdistrict of Kurigram on the bank of the Dharla river. It is considered the main subdistrict of Kurigram.
- Nageshwari Upazila: northern subdistrict.
- Phulbari Upazila: northern subdistrict on the border with India and the Bengali district of Lalmonhirhat.
- Rajarhat Upazila: western subdistrict which has developed as a business center.
- Raomari Upazila: independent subdistrict which played an important role in the Bangladesh War for Independence.
- Ulipur Upazila: Largest subdistrict by size.

== Places of interest ==
- Jamuna River
- Sonahat Landport
- Sonahat Bridge
- Potaka Bhaban
- Shongram thaky Shadhinota Museum
- North Bengal Museum
- Dhorla Bridge
- Mekurtari Shahi Mosque
- Chandi Mandir
- Dolmancha Mandir
- Bir Protik Taramon Bibi's house
- Naodanga Royal Palace
- Sindur Moti
- Enclaves
- Pangeshwari Temple
- Bhetarbandh Royal Palace
- Chandamari Mosque
- Two Canons of Panga Kingdom (Preserved at the BGB Gate)
- Kazir Mosque
- Chilmari land port
- Ghogadaha Bazar
- Ulipur Munshibari
- Mawlana Bhasani Bridge

== Infrastructure ==
=== Health ===
In Kurigram, there is a single government hospital, two private hospitals, and an eye hospital. In addition, there are eight upazila-level health complexes, a maternity clinic, and a tuberculosis clinic in the district. The district has 100% Expanded Program on Immunization coverage, 96% sanitation coverage, and 96% pure drinking water coverage.

== Education ==
Like in other parts of Bangladesh, there is a four level system for education. Students spend five years in Primary, five years in Secondary, two years in Higher Secondary, and four to nine years in Tertiary Education. There are 1 agricultural University, 43 colleges, 257 high schools, 563 registered and 552 non-registered primary schools, 224 madrasa, 1 polytechnical institute, and 1 technical school and college in the district. Along with Bengali, English is compulsory at all levels of education.

- Kurigram Govt. College
- Kurigram Govt. Women's college
- Kurigram Agricultural University
- Kurigram Polytechnic Institute
- Kurigram Collectorate School and College
- Majida Adarsha Degree College
- Khalilganj High School and College
- Kurigram Govt. High school
- Kurigram Govt. Girls' High School
- Border Guard Public School (BGPS), Kurigram
- Kurigram Nursing Institute
- Kurigram Technical school & College
- Shishu Niketan kurigram
- kisoloy primary school
- Kurigram River View High school
- Kurigram Alia Kamil Madrasah
- Kurigram Farigat Madrasha (only for girls)

== Notable people ==
- Taramon Bibi
- Syed Shamsul Haque, poet and writer
- AKM Maidul Islam, politician
- Kanai Lal Sarker, politician
- Adv. Ruhul Kabir Rizvi, Politician and Lawyer, Senior Joint Secretary General,Spokesperson of the Bangladesh Nationalist Party & Adviser to the Prime Minister of Bangladesh
- Anwara Syed Haq, poet and writer
- Abbasuddin Ahmed, singer and composer
- Kasim Uddin, prince of Bhawaiya
- Ajit Roy, singer
- Badol Khondokar, film director and producer
- Raufun Basunia, activist
- Maj. Gen. (Retd) AMSA Amin, Military Officer, Politician and former Ambassador
- Md. Amjad Hossain Talukdar, politician
- Rokanuddaula Mandal, politician
- Golam Hossain, politician
- Amzad Hossain Sarker, politician
- Ahmed Nazmin Sultana, politician
- Akkas Ali, politician
- Md. Motiur Rahman, politician
- Aslam Hossain Saudagar, politician
- M. A. Matin (Kurigram politician), politician
- Golam Habib Dulal, politician
- Tajul Islam Choudhury, politician
- Abdul Bari Sarkar, politician
- Mohammad Sadakat Hossain, politician
- Najimuddaula, politician
- Md. Umar Farooq, politician
- Ponir Uddin Ahmed, politician
- Noor-E-Hasna Lily Chowdhury, politician
- Mohammad Sirajul Haque, politician
- Md Zakir Hossain, politician
- A.K.M. Shahidul Islam politician
- Shahnaz Sardar politician
- Md. Biplab Hasan, politician

== See also ==
- Districts of Bangladesh
- Upazilas of Bangladesh
- Divisions of Bangladesh
- Upazila
- Thana
- Administrative geography of Bangladesh
