= Phulbari Upazila =

Phulbari Upazila may refer to:

In Bangladesh:

- Phulbari Upazila, Dinajpur
- Phulbari Upazila, Kurigram

Elsewhere:

- Phulbari, Mechi, Nepal
- Phulbari, Rapti, Nepal
- Phulbari, Jalpaiguri, West Bengal, India, location of a road border crossing into Bangladesh
