= List of Bhawaiya singers =

Bhawaiya is a musical form or a popular folk music in Northern Bangladesh, especially Rangpur District and in Cooch Behar, Jalpaiguri, part of Darjeeling and North Dinajpur district of West Bengal and Dhubri and Goalpara of Assam in India. These area were covered by Kamtapur state and so for the song also Kamtapuri language is used. This folk song is sung traditionally both solo and by chorus. The following is a list of Bhawaiya singers from Bangladesh and West Bengal:

- Momtaz Begum
- Abdul Alim
- Farida Parveen
- Kanak Chapa
- Kasim Uddin
- Abbas Uddin
- Mustafa Zaman Abbasi
- Ferdausi Begum
- Rathindranath Roy

From Assam:

- Pratima Barua Pandey
- Zubeen Garg
- Papon
- From West Bengal
- Saurav Moni
- Shri Gita Roy Bavaman
