= Killing of Felani Khatun =

2011 incident near Phulbari, Kurigram

- Part of Deaths along the Bangladesh–India border
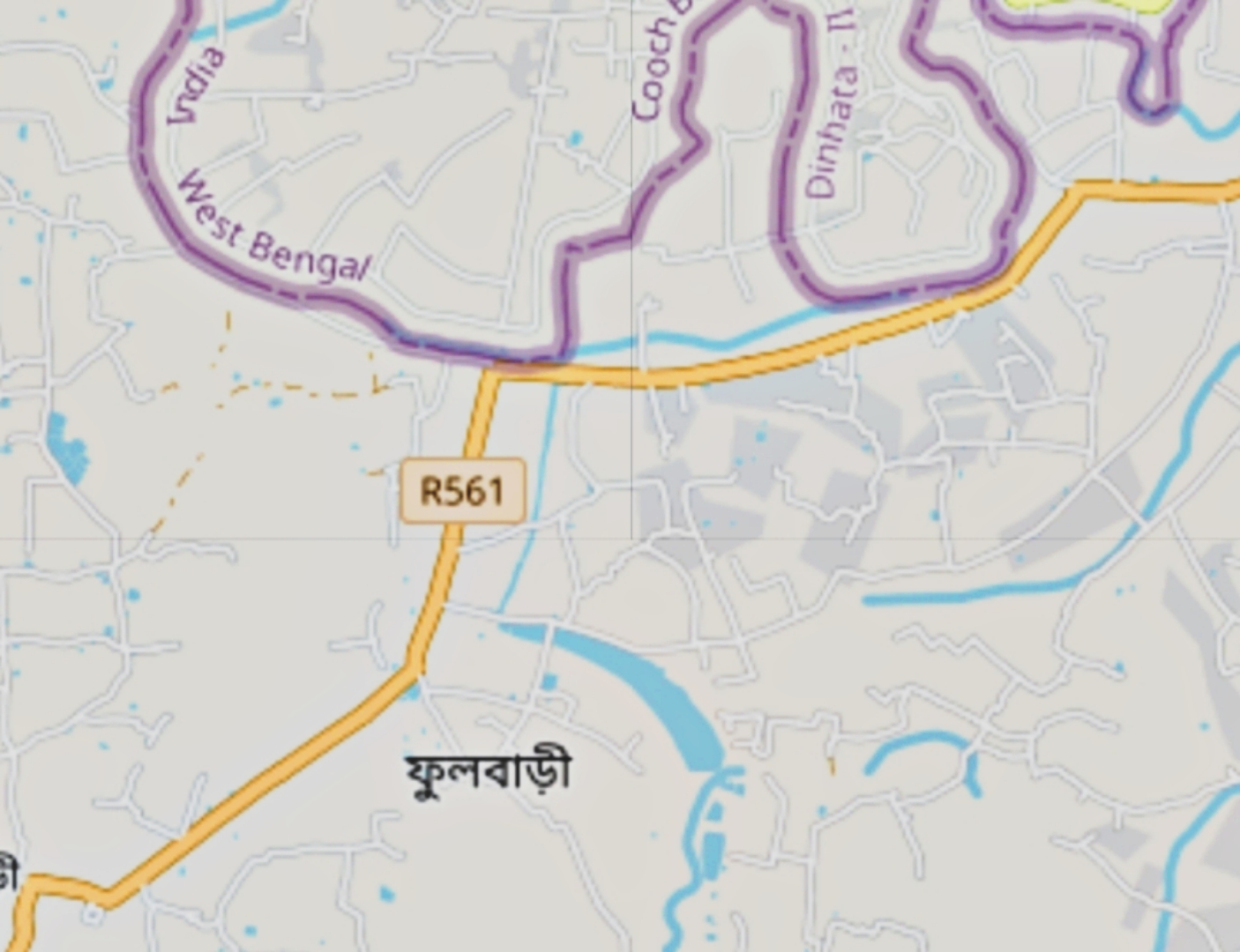
- Map of Phulbari including border line highlighted in violet
- Native name: ফেলানি হত্যাকান্ড
- Date: January 7, 2011; 15 years ago
- Time: c. 5:30 am (UTC+6)
- Location: Anantapur, Phulbari, Kurigram, Bangladesh; 26.024334°N 89.583338°E
- Participants: Indian Border Security Force
- Deaths: 1 (Felani Khatun)
- Accused: Constable Amiya Ghosh
- Verdict: Not guilty

On 7 January 2011, Felani Khatun, a 15-year-old Bangladeshi girl, was shot and killed by the Indian Border Security Force (BSF) while attempting to cross the India-Bangladesh border near Phulbari Upazila in Kurigram, Bangladesh. Felani and her father, Noor Islam, were returning to Bangladesh after residing in Assam, India, without valid travel documents illegally.

The incident was captured in a photograph that showed her body suspended on the barbed-wire border fence. The image, which was widely circulated, became a focal point in discussions about border enforcement practices and human rights concerns.

== Background ==
Felani Khatun (Bengali: ফেলানী খাতুন; c. 1995 – 7 January 2011)) was a 15-year-old Bangladeshi girl. Her family had migrated to India seeking better economic opportunities. They resided in Assam, where Felani worked as a domestic worker. In early 2011, the family decided to return to Bangladesh in preparation for Felani's arranged marriage. Without valid travel documents, they opted to cross the border illegally.

== Incident ==
On 7 January 2011, at dawn, Felani and her father attempted to scale the barbed-wire fence using a ladder. During the attempt, her clothing became entangled, leaving her stranded atop the fence.

As Felani struggled to free herself, she was shot by BSF personnel, identified as Constable Amiya Ghosh. Eyewitnesses stated that she initially survived the gunshot but succumbed to her injuries while still trapped on the fence. Her body remained suspended for several hours before being retrieved.

== Reaction and aftermath ==
The Bangladeshi government swiftly condemned the shooting of Felani Khatun. Foreign Minister Dipu Moni issued a statement expressing outrage over the incident, calling it a "gross violation of human rights". The Ministry of Foreign Affairs of Bangladesh officially lodged a diplomatic protest with the Indian government, demanding that the responsible BSF personnel be held accountable.

While the Indian government expressed regret over the incident, it maintained that the BSF personnel were acting within the guidelines of border security enforcement.

In a 2021 statement, Human Rights Watch condemned the killing, calling it "excessive use of force" by BSF personnel and called for an independent investigation into the incident and for the Indian government to hold accountable those responsible.

Bangladesh-based human rights organisation Odhikar's President Chowdhury Rafiqul Abrar also condemned the killing and called for immediate justice. Human rights activist, Kiriti Roy called the killing as "a shame for India".

In January 2022, The Daily Star reported on the eleventh anniversary of the killing and noted that her family was still seeking justice.

=== Legal proceedings ===
Following the incident, the BSF initiated an internal investigation into the shooting. Constable Amiya Ghosh, the BSF personnel involved, was charged with violating the force's operational protocols. The case was brought before a BSF General Court Martial (GCM) court, which is responsible for investigating incidents involving BSF personnel.

In 2013, the GSF court acquitted Constable Ghosh, citing a lack of sufficient evidence to support the allegations. This verdict was widely criticized, particularly by Bangladeshi officials and international human rights organizations, who questioned the integrity of the trial process and the accountability of the BSF.

Following this decision, the Bangladeshi government called for a retrial and greater transparency in the judicial process. In 2015, a retrial was conducted. However, the GSF court upheld the original acquittal, stating that the procedural and evidentiary limitations made it impossible to establish guilt beyond a reasonable doubt.

In 2016, the National Human Rights Commission of India asked the Secretary of Ministry of Home Affairs of the Government of India to submit a compliance report with proof of payment with the sum of ₹500,000 in compensation to Felani's family.

== Legacy ==
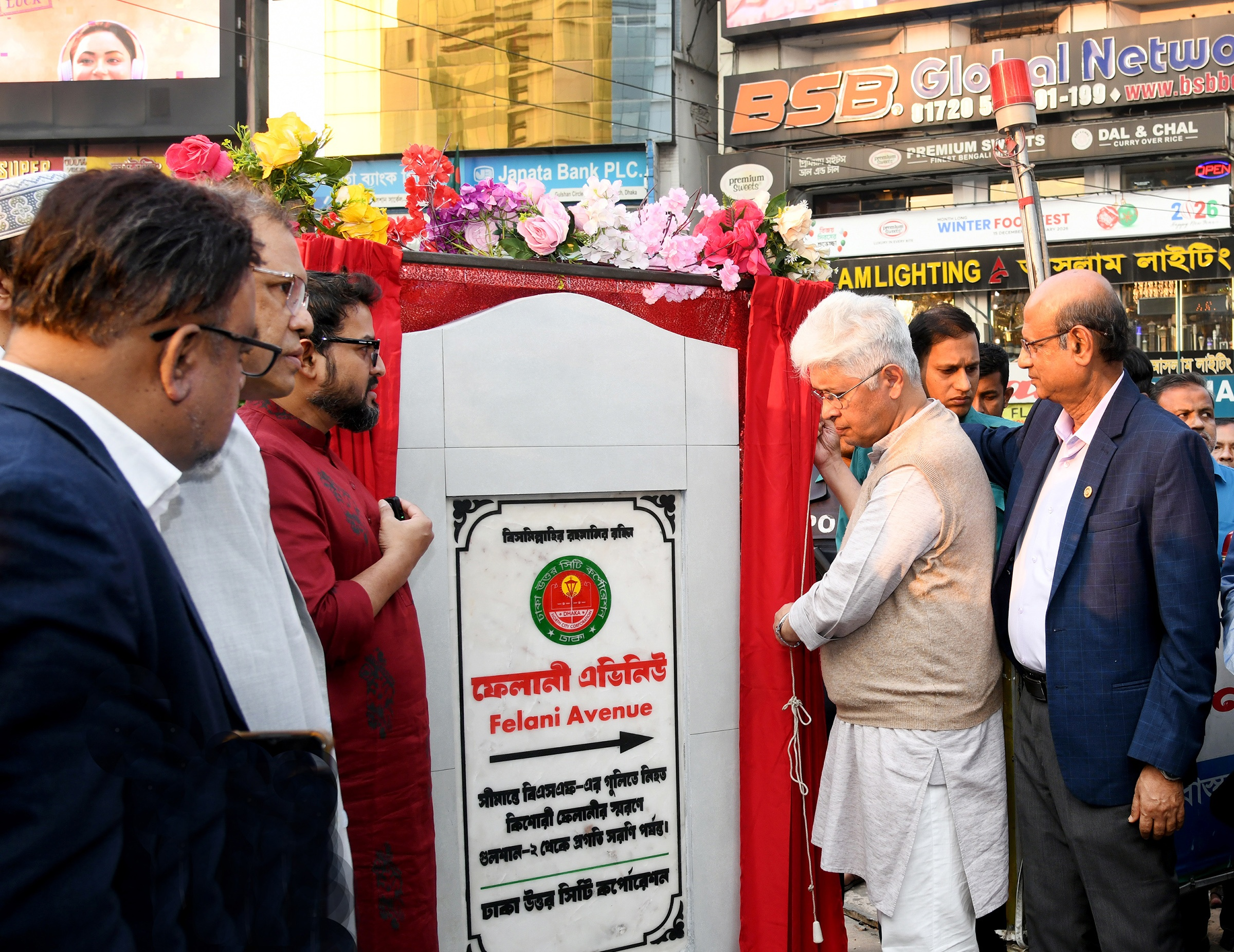
Adilur Rahman Khan unveiling Felani Avenue nameplate

In 2021, Mahbubul A Khalid along with composer Ahmed Imtiaz Bulbul released a song titled 'Felani' commemorating her tenth death anniversary.

The case has also continued to be discussed in Bangladeshi media and civil society. In 2022, Prothom Alo published an article in which human rights activist Kiriti Roy described Felani's killing as a symbol of the continuing controversy surrounding border killings.

In 2025, Jahangirnagar University also renamed four of its residential halls in honour of Felani Khatun and other national figures. The decision formed part of a broader initiative to commemorate individuals regarded as significant in Bangladesh's history and public life.

In December 2025, A road in Dhaka Diplomatic Zone renamed as Felani Avenue.
