= Kanailal Sarkar =

Kanailal Sarkar or Kanai Lal Sarkar may refer to:

- Kanai Lal Sarkar (Bangladeshi politician) (1925–1980)
- Kanailal Sarkar (West Bengal politician) (1911 – not before 1986)
