= Rajarhat Upazila =

Upazila in Kurigram district

Rajarhat রাজারহাট
- Upazila
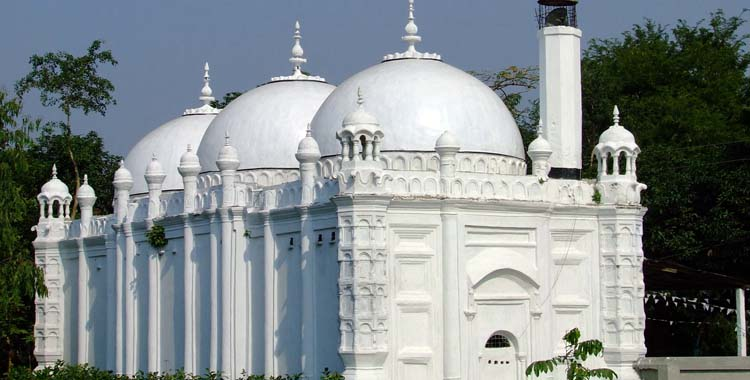
- Chandamari Mandalpara Jame Masjid

- Coordinates: 25°48′N 89°33′E
- Country: Bangladesh
- Division: Rangpur
- District: Kurigram

Government
  - Upazila Parisad Chairman: Abul Hashem
  - UNO: MD. Rafikul Islam

Area
  - Total: 166.64 km^{2} (64.34 sq mi)

Population (2022)
  - Total: 203,060
  - Density: 1,218.6/km^{2} (3,156.0/sq mi)
- Time zone: UTC+6 (BST)
- Postal code: 5610
- Website: rajarhat.kurigram.gov.bd

Rajarhat Upazila mauza geocode map

Rajarhat (Bengali: রাজারহাট) is an upazila of Kurigram District in the Division of Rangpur, Bangladesh. Since 1981 it has been a Thana and later on September 14, 1983, it was turned into an upazila by the government.

== Geography ==
Rajarhat is located at 25.8000°N 89.5500°E, which is about 10 kilometers west to the center of Kurigram district. It is surrounded by Phulbari and Lalmonirhat Sadar upazilas on the north, Ulipur and Pirgachha upazilas on the south, Kurigram sadar upazila on the east, and Lalmonirhat Sadar and Kaunia upazilas on the west. It has 46,489 households and a total area of 166.64 km^{2}. Two rivers, Teesta and Dharla pass through this upazila.

== Demographics ==
Religions in Rajarhat Upazila (2022)
Religion	Percent
Islam	81.66%
Hinduism	18.32%
Other or not stated	0.02%

According to the 2022 Bangladeshi census, Rajarhat Upazila had 53,625 households and a population of 203,060. 8.63% of the population were under 5 years of age. Rajarhat had a literacy rate (age 7 and over) of 70.27%: 74.43% for males and 66.33% for females, and a sex ratio of 95.83 males for every 100 females. 17,148 (8.44%) lived in urban areas.

According to the 2011 Census of Bangladesh, Rajarhat Upazila had 46,489 households and a population of 182,981. 39,385 (21.52%) were under 10 years of age. Rajarhat had a literacy rate (age 7 and over) of 52.03%, compared to the national average of 51.8%, and a sex ratio of 1060 females per 1000 males. 9,292 (5.08%) lived in urban areas.

As of the 1991 Census of Bangladesh, Rajarhat has a population of 158,648. Males constitute 50.52% of the population, and females 49.48%. Upazila's adult (over 18) population is 72,315. Rajarhat has an average literacy rate of 27.1% (7+ years), and the national average of 32.4% literacy.

== Points of interest ==
- Sindurmati Dighi
- Chandamari Mosque
- Pangeshwari Temple
- Gharialdanga Zamindar Bari
- Panga Rajbari
- Two cannons ascribed to Fate Khan and Kalu Khan (Panga Rajbari)
- Koteshwar Shiva Mandir

== Administration ==
Rajarhat Upazila is divided into seven union parishads: Biddanondo, Chakirpashar, Chinai, Gharialdanga, Nazimkhan, Rajarhat, and Umarmajid. The union parishads are subdivided into 110 mauzas and 180 villages.

Similar to other upazilas in the country, Upazila Parisad headed by an Upazila Chairman who is elected in a direct vote of the people is the highest form of local government in Rajarhat upazila.

== Education ==
- Literacy Rate: 60%
- Number of Colleges: 4
- Number of High Schools: 34
- Number of Madrasas: 45
- Number of Primary Schools (government run): 49
- Number of Primary Schools (private): 67

== Notable residents ==
- Abdullah Sarwrdi (Ex MP)
- Raufun Basunia (Late leader of anti dictatorship movement)
- Jahangir Hossain Chowdhury (First Upazilla Chairman Rajarhat)
- Badol Khondokar ( film director and producer )

== See also ==
- Upazilas of Bangladesh
- Districts of Bangladesh
- Divisions of Bangladesh
