= SM Abraham Lincoln =

Bangladeshi social worker and lawyer

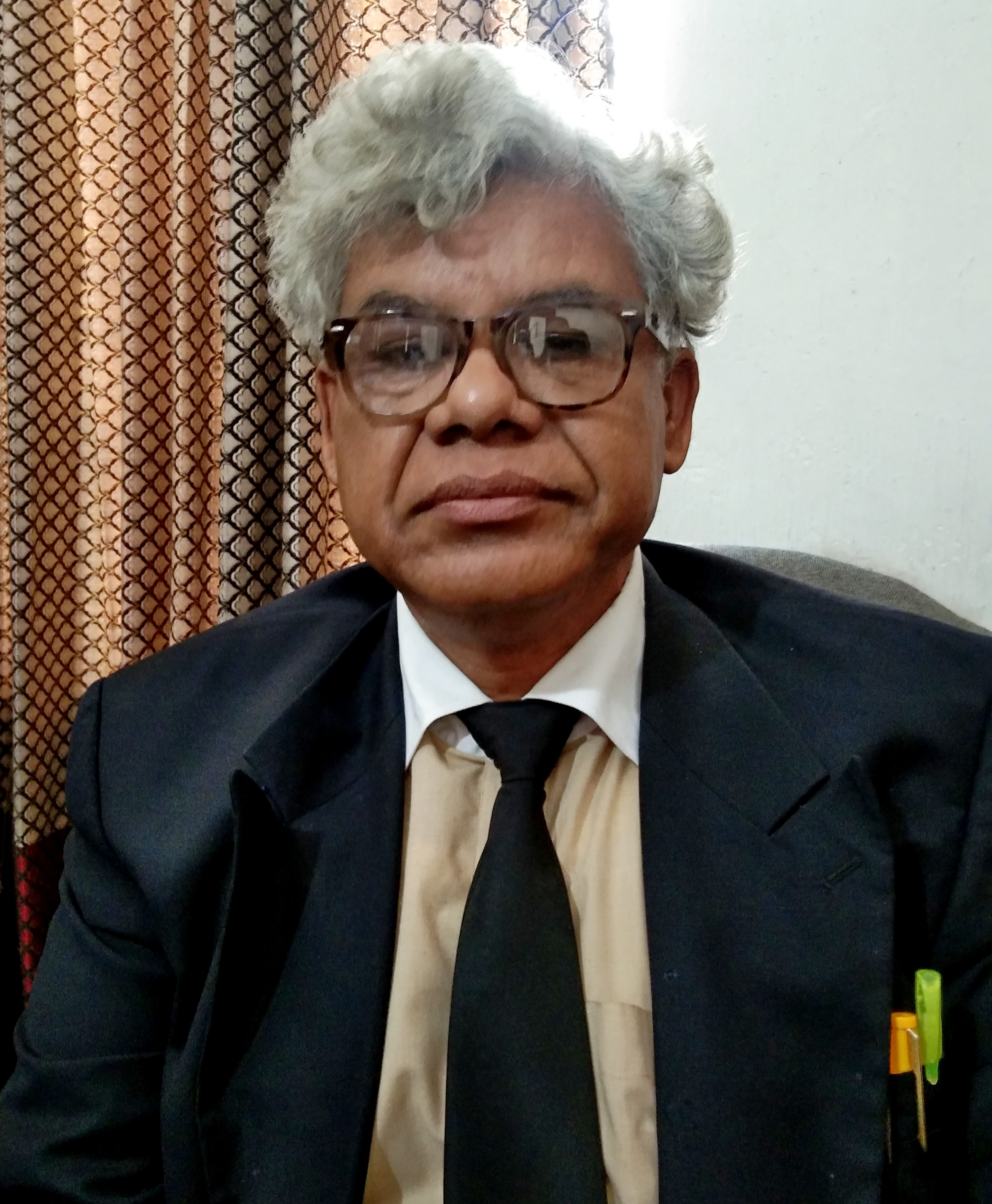
- Born: November 14, 1966 (age 59); Kurigram, Bangladesh
- Education: Rajshahi University
- Occupations: Lawyer, social worker, human rights activist, educator, historian
- Years active: 1991–present
- Organization: Bangladesh Supreme Court
- Notable work: Lawyer of Felani Khatun Border Shooting Case; Founding North Bengal Museum; Bangladesh-India Enclave Exchange Efforts
- Spouse: Nazmun Naher Sweety
- Awards: Ekushey Padak; Independence Award

SM Abraham Lincoln (born November 14, 1966) is a Bangladeshi social worker, human rights activist and lawyer.

== Early life and education ==
SM Abraham Lincoln was born on November 14, 1966, in Baksipara village, Krishnapur district, Kurigram, Bangladesh, to Mohiuddin Ahmad, a liberation war organizer, and Amena Khatun. He was the fifth of their seven sons. His childhood was influenced by the events of the Bangladesh Liberation War, which shaped his later commitment to social justice and human rights.

Lincoln attended Khalilganj Primary School and Kurigram Aliya Madrasa, completing his secondary education at Khalilganj High School in 1982 and higher secondary education at Kurigram Government College in 1984. He earned LL.B. from Rajshahi University in 1988 and LL.M. in 1989. Lincoln also completed a diploma in rural management and development from the Philippines.

He was assistant general secretary of the Rajshahi University Central Student's Union (RUCSU) in 1988 while studying at the university.

== Career ==
Lincoln started his career as a lawyer in Kurigram on October 9, 1991, and was admitted as a High Court lawyer in 1996. He is listed as a lawyer of Bangladesh Supreme Court. Since 2007, Lincoln has been working as the public prosecutor of Kurigram.

Lincoln has been the lawyer for Felani Khatun's family in the Border shooting of Felani Khatun, which is ongoing in the Supreme Court of India. He also helped in the rehabilitation of Taraman Bibi, a freedom fighter who made contribution to the liberation war.

He is the founder of The North Bengal Museum, which houses artifacts collected over 20 years of research. Lincoln has authored 16 books, primarily on local history, published by institutions such as the Bangla Academy and Asiatic Society.

As an educator, Lincoln founded Kurigram Law College. He has served as a senator and member of the Law Examination Committee at the National University of Bangladesh and as a member of the Faculty of Law's Committee of Courses at University of Rajshahi.

Lincoln is the convenor of The Bangladesh-India Border Victim Rescue Legal Assistance Forum, which provides legal support to border incident victims. He was also an adviser to the Bangladesh-India Enclave Exchange Coordination Committee, which facilitated the exchange of 161 enclaves between Bangladesh and India.

He has served as a legal adviser to the Bangladesh National Human Rights Commission and Begum Rokeya University in Rangpur.

== Awards ==
On 22 January 2022, Lincoln was awarded the Ekushey Padak, the second most important award for civilians in Bangladesh and in 2024 was awarded the Independence Award (Swadhinata Padak), the highest civilian award in Bangladesh.

== Personal life ==
Lincoln is married to Nazmun Naher Sweety, and the couple has a son, Sashowta Gourab Siddhartha.
