= Phulbari, Nepal =

Phulbari, Nepal may refer to:

- Phulbari, Mechi
- Phulbari, Rapti
