= Kanailal =

Kanailal or Kanai Lal (Bengali: কানাইলাল) is a masculine given name. Notable people with this name include:

- Kanailal Bhattacharyya (1917–1983), Indian politician
- Kanailal Bhattacharjee (1909–1931), Bengali nationalist
- Kanailal Dutta (1888–1908), Indian nationalist
- Kanailal Niyogi (1924–1961), Indian railway worker
- Kanai Lal Sarker (1925–1980), Bangladeshi politician
- Kanailal Sarkar (1911 – not before 1985), Indian physician and politician
