= Kurigram Sadar Upazila =

Kurigram Sadar কুড়িগ্রাম সদর
- Upazila
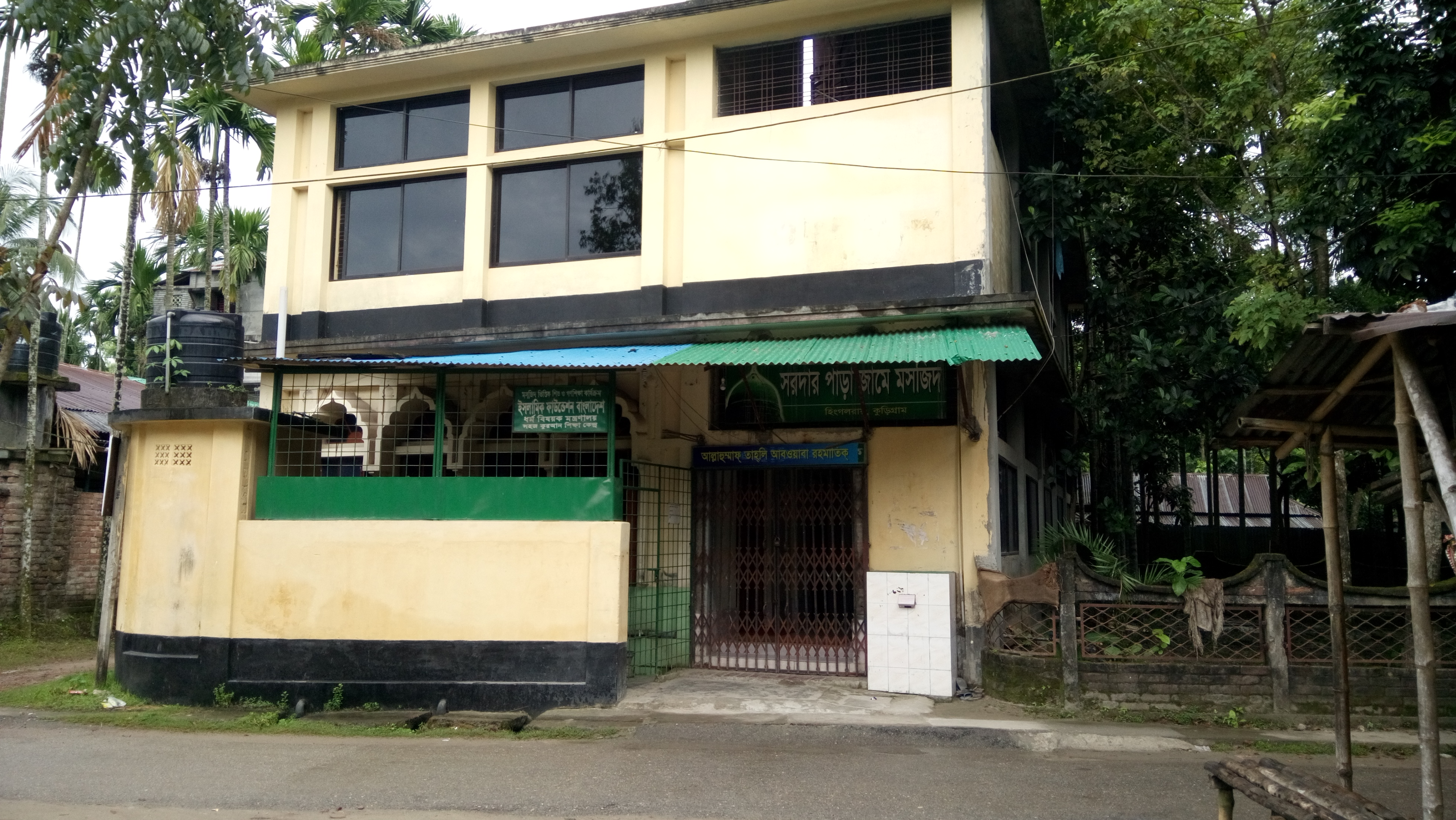
- Sadarpara Jame Masjid, Kurigram

- Coordinates: 25°49′N 89°39′E
- Country: Bangladesh
- Division: Rangpur
- District: Kurigram
- Headquarters: Kurigram

Area
  - Total: 276.43 km^{2} (106.73 sq mi)

Population (2022)
  - Total: 361,408
  - Density: 1,307.4/km^{2} (3,386.2/sq mi)
- Time zone: UTC+6 (BST)
- Postal code: 5600
- Area code: 0581
- Website: kurigramsadar.kurigram.gov.bd

Kurigram Sadar Upazila mauza geocode map

Kurigram Sadar (Bengali: কুড়িগ্রাম সদর) is an upazila of Kurigram District in Rangpur Division, Bangladesh.

== Geography ==
Kurigram Sadar is located at 25.8167°N 89.6500°E. It has a total area 276.43 km^{2}.

== Demographics ==
Historical population
Year	Pop. (000)	±%
1981	182	—
1991	217	+19.2%
2001	259	+19.4%
2011	312	+20.5%
2022	361	+15.7%
Source: Bangladesh Bureau of Statistics

Religions in Kurigram Sadar Upazila (2022)
Religion	Percent
Islam	93.38%
Hinduism	6.60%
Other or not stated	0.02%

According to the 2022 Bangladeshi census, Kurigram Sadar Upazila had 90,115 households and a population of 361,408. 9.98% of the population were under 5 years of age. Kurigram Sadar had a literacy rate (age 7 and over) of 69.87%: 72.85% for males and 67.00% for females, and a sex ratio of 97.29 males for every 100 females. 131,901 (36.50%) lived in urban areas.

According to the 2011 Census of Bangladesh, Kurigram Sadar Upazila had 72,592 households and a population of 312,408. 74,572 (23.87%) were under 10 years of age. Kurigram Sadar had a literacy rate (age 7 and over) of 46.14%, compared to the national average of 51.8%, and a sex ratio of 1022 females per 1000 males. 80,810 (25.87%) lived in urban areas.

As of the 1991 Census of Bangladesh, Kurigram Sadar has a population of 217,311. Males constitute are 51.01% of the population, and females 48.99%. This Upazila's eighteen up population is 106,925. Kurigram Sadar has an average literacy rate of 26.2% (7+ years), and the national average of 32.4% literate.

== Administration ==
Kurigram Sadar Upazila is divided into Kurigram Municipality and eight union parishads.

The union parishads are subdivided into 78 mauzas and 266 villages.

Kurigram Municipality is subdivided into 9 wards and 106 mahallas.

== Education ==
- Kurigram Government College
- Kurigram Govt. Women's College
- Mojida Degree College
- Kurigram Govt. High School
- Kurigram Govt. Girls' High School
- Shuvesscha tutorial Homes, Mollah para, Kurigram
- Mogalbasa Bilateral High School
- Kurigram Polytechnic Institute
- Kurigram Agricultural University

== See also ==
- Upazilas of Bangladesh
- Districts of Bangladesh
- Divisions of Bangladesh
- Administrative geography of Bangladesh
