= Phulbari Upazila, Kurigram =

Upazila in Kurigram district

Phulbari ফুলবাড়ী
- Upazila
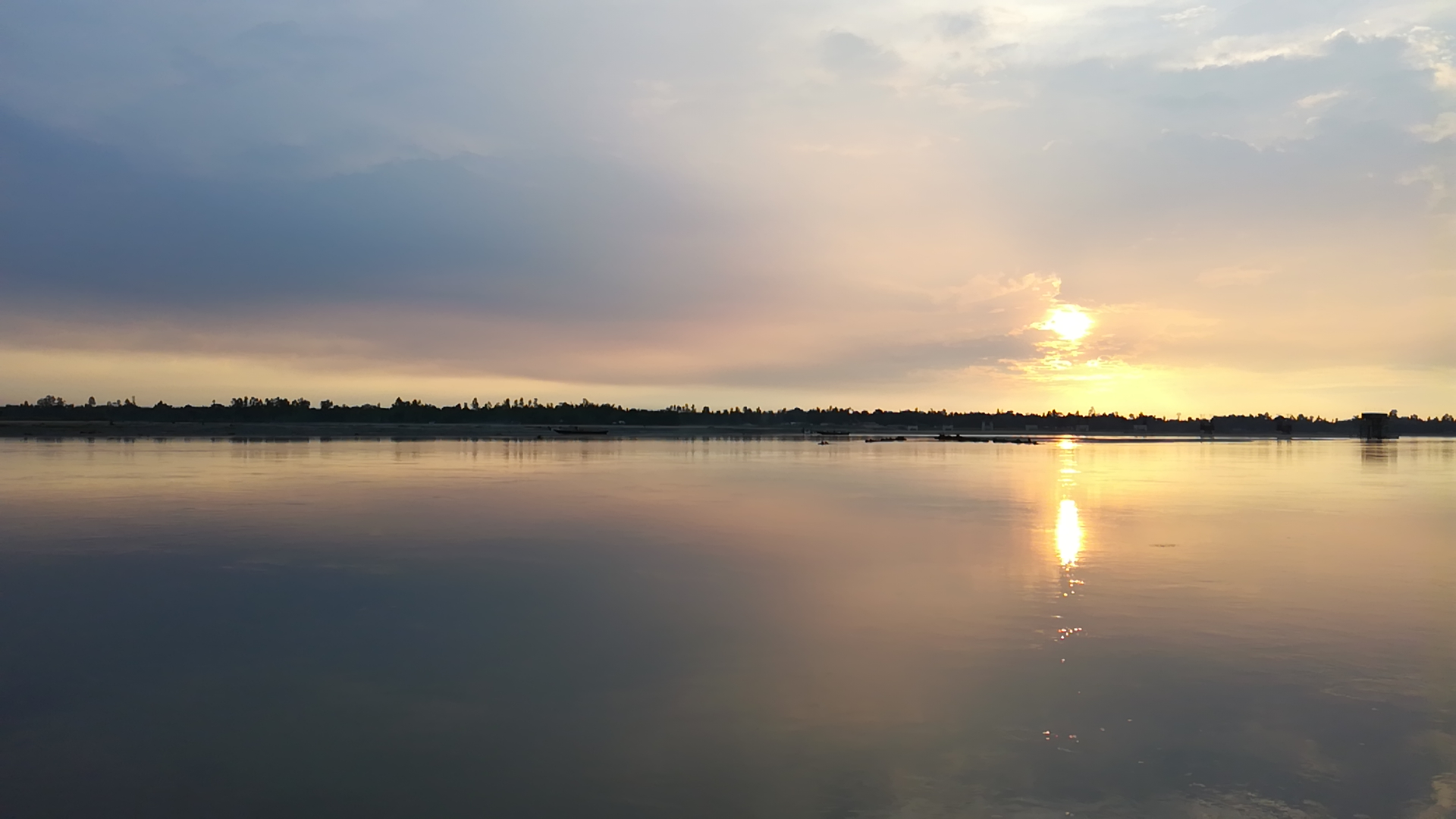
- Dharla River at Phulbari

- Coordinates: 25°57′N 89°34′E
- Country: Bangladesh
- Division: Rangpur
- District: Kurigram

Area
  - Total: 156.61 km^{2} (60.47 sq mi)

Population (2022)
  - Total: 186,682
  - Density: 1,192.0/km^{2} (3,087.3/sq mi)
- Time zone: UTC+6 (BST)
- Postal code: 5680
- Website: Official Map of Phulbari

Phulbari (Bengali: ফুলবাড়ী) is an upazila of Kurigram District in the Division of Rangpur, Bangladesh.

== Geography ==
Phulbari is located at 25.9500°N 89.5667°E. It has 39,643 households and total area 156.61 km^{2}.

It is 8 kilometres (5.0 mi) east of Lalmonirhat town, and was separated from Lalmonirhat District by Dharla River. Lalmonirhat is connected by kulaghat-Sonaikazi river crossing on Dharla river.

It is 28 kilometres (17 mi) northwest of Kurigram town.

It is bounded by Nageshwari Upazila to the east, Kurigram Sadar and Rajarhat upazilas to the south, Lalmonirhat Sadar Upazila to the southwest and the Indian state of West Bengal to the north.

== Demographics ==
Religions in Phulbari Upazila (2022)
Religion	Percent
Islam	90.31%
Hinduism	9.67%
Other or not stated	0.02%

According to the 2022 Bangladeshi census, Phulbari Upazila had 48,154 households and a population of 186,682. 9.23% of the population were under 5 years of age. Phulbari had a literacy rate (age 7 and over) of 66.01%: 70.29% for males and 61.93% for females, and a sex ratio of 96.63 males for every 100 females. 22,231 (11.91%) lived in urban areas.

According to the 2011 Census of Bangladesh, Phulbari Upazila had 39,643 households and a population of 160,250. 37,035 (23.11%) were under 10 years of age. Phulbari had a literacy rate (age 7 and over) of 44.76%, compared to the national average of 51.8%, and a sex ratio of 1040 females per 1000 males. 12,895 (8.05%) lived in urban areas.

As of the 1991 Census of Bangladesh, Phulbari has a population of 129,668. Males constitute 50.49% of the population, and females 49.51%. This Upazila's population over the age of eighteen is 62,699. Phulbari has an average literacy rate of 24% (7+ years), and the national average of 32.4% literate.

== Administration ==
Phulbari Thana, formed in 1857, was turned into an upazila in 1984.

Phulbari Upazila is divided into six union parishads: Baravita, Bhangamor, Kashipur, Nawdanga, Phulbari, and Shimulbari. The union parishads are subdivided into 50 mauzas and 166 villages.

== See also ==
- Upazilas of Bangladesh
- Districts of Bangladesh
- Divisions of Bangladesh
