= Raufun Basunia =

Bangladeshi activist

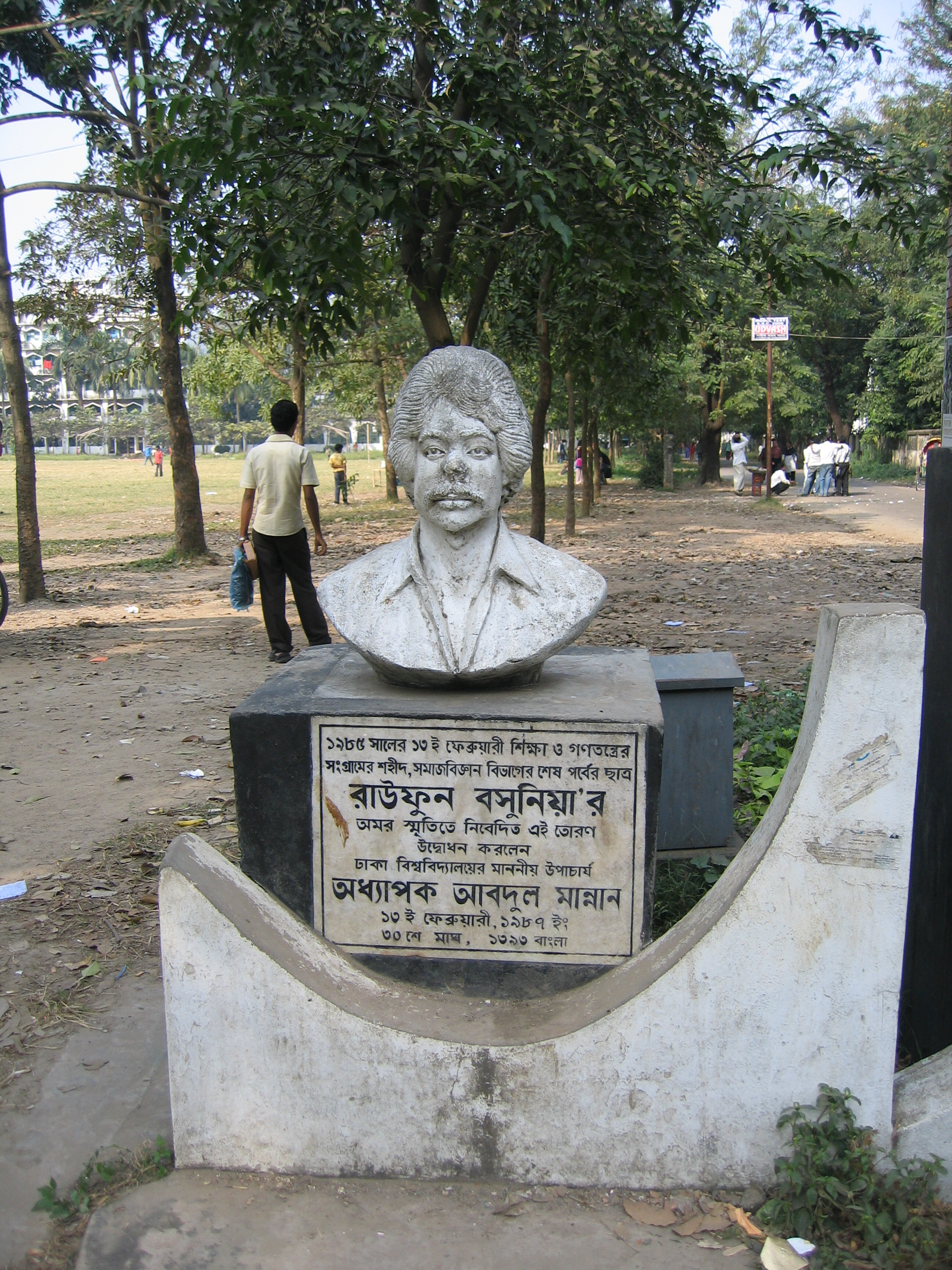
Raufun Basunia memorial.

Raufun Basunia (Bengali: রাউফুন বসুনীয়া Raufun Basunia, died 13 February 1985), former Joint Secretary of Bangladesh Chhatra League, and the General Secretary of its University of Dhaka branch was a prominent student leader who led anti-dictatorship movement in Bangladesh and was killed by pro-junta activists. He was shot dead during a clash between Chhatra Sangram Parishad and Chhatra Samaj, the ruling Jatiyo Party-backed student wing in front of Mohsin Hall at University of Dhaka on 13 February 1985. His death provoked the anti-junta student activists, and the movement for restoration of democracy became even more radicalised and consolidated. It became so violent that the dictator Hussein Muhammad Ershad had to resign shortly afterwards.

In 1985 young Raufun was a final-year Sociology student at the University of Dhaka. After his death, he became a vivid example in the history of student movement in Bangladesh. University of Dhaka authority later placed a statue of Raufun Basunia in its campus commemorating his sacrifice.

== Early life ==
Raufun Basunia was born in a typical village named as Paikpara which is situated in Rajarhat Upazila of Kurigram District in Bangladesh. His father Najrul Islam was a primary school teacher. Mother Feroza Begum was a housewife. He completed his secondary and higher secondary education from Pangarani Laksmipriya High School and Carmicheal College respectively. Then he got admitted in Sociology department in University of Dhaka. After completing his honours there he got enrolled in the Master's program in the same department. He could not complete his study due to his sudden death in 1985.

== Anti-dictatorship movement ==
The people of Bangladesh did not tolerate the occupation of power by the coup played by General Ershad in 1982. Protests grew all around the country. Students, specially students of Dhaka University was in the front line of these protests. That time Raufun Basunia was the General Secretary of the mostly traditional and influential student front Bangladesh Chhatra League's Dhaka University front. To counteract the pro-democracy movement, the junta formed a new student organisation Nutun Bangla Chatra Samaj whose job was to baffle the protests. This student body with arms and ammunitions under military auspices started to capture different residential halls of Dhaka University. This practice soon got extended to other educational institutions of the country. On 13 February 1985 the Dhaka University front of Bangladesh Chhatra League brought a regular procession under the lead of Raufun Basunia. No later it reached the main road of the university, crossing Surjosen Hall and Haji Muhammad Muhushin Hall, it had suddenly been attacked by the armed gangsters of Chatra Samaj. Raufun Basunia got shot and dead in that attack. But this could not tame the movement. Instead the people and students became so more violent that the military government was compelled to close its student front. At last, General Ershad left power in 1990. Raufun Basunia is still a source of inspiration in any movement against injustice and oppression in Bangladesh.

== Grave ==
The grave of Raufun Basunia is in his family graveyard situated in Paikpara, Rajarhat, Kurigram.

== Basunia family ==
Raufun's father died in 2008. His mother died a few months later. His eldest brother Dafiul belaet Fortune Basunia and younger brother Nahin Basunia live in Dhaka. The second eldest brother Shafin Basunia runs a small business. One of his sisters, Lucky Basunia, is a school teacher in Rangpur. The other sister, Jaali Basunia, is a housewife.

== See also ==
- Noor Hossain
