= Mekurtari Shahi Mosque =

Mosque in Rajarhat, Kurigram, Bangladesh

- মেকুরটারী শাহী মসজিদ
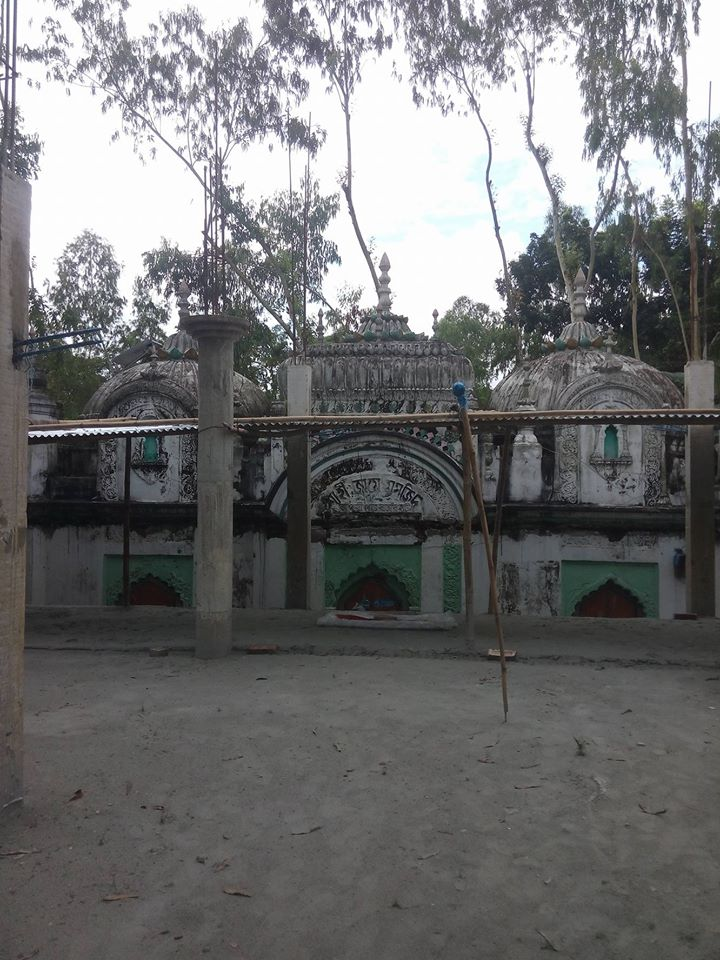

- Location of the mosque in Bangladesh

Religion
- Affiliation: Islam
- Ecclesiastical or organizational status: Mosque
- Status: Active

Location
- Location: Baparipara, Rajarhat Upazila, Kurigram District
- Country: Bangladesh
- Interactive map of Mekurtari Shahi Mosque
- Coordinates: 25°48′1″N 89°32′59″E

Architecture
- Type: Mosque architecture
- Style: Mughal
- Founder: Shamir Uddin Bapari
- Established: Mughal era

Specifications
- Length: 9.75 m (32.0 ft)
- Width: 3.05 m (10.0 ft)
- Dome: Three
- Minaret: 14
- Materials: Brick

The Mekurtari Shahi Mosque (Bengali: মেকুরটারী শাহী মসজিদ) is a mosque located in Baparipara, Rajarhat Upazila, in the Kurigram District of Bangladesh. It was built during the Mughal era. The Bangladeshi Department of Archaeology designated the mosque as a protected monument. The Mekuratari Shahi Mosque is an ancient and historic religious structure located in Kurigram district, a border district of Bangladesh. It is situated approximately 1 kilometre (0.62 mi) northeast of Rajarhat Upazila headquarters in the village of Baparipara.

== History ==
No inscription has been found in the mosque, making it impossible to determine its exact date of construction. However, due to similarities in architectural style with Mughal architecture, it is believed that the mosque was built before 1820, during the Mughal period. According to local legend, about 1720 the village zamindar, Shamir Uddin Biyapari, returned from performing Hajj on foot and constructed this mosque.

== Architectural style ==
The mosque measures 9.8 metres (32 ft) long and 3.0 metres (10 ft) wide. It is surrounded by a protective wall that is 0.91 metres (3 ft) high. In front of the mosque, there are three doors, a beautiful entrance arch, two minarets, and four tall minarets at the corners. Next to these minarets, there are eight smaller minarets. In the center of the roof there are three large domes. A vast pond is located in front of the mosque.

== Gallery ==
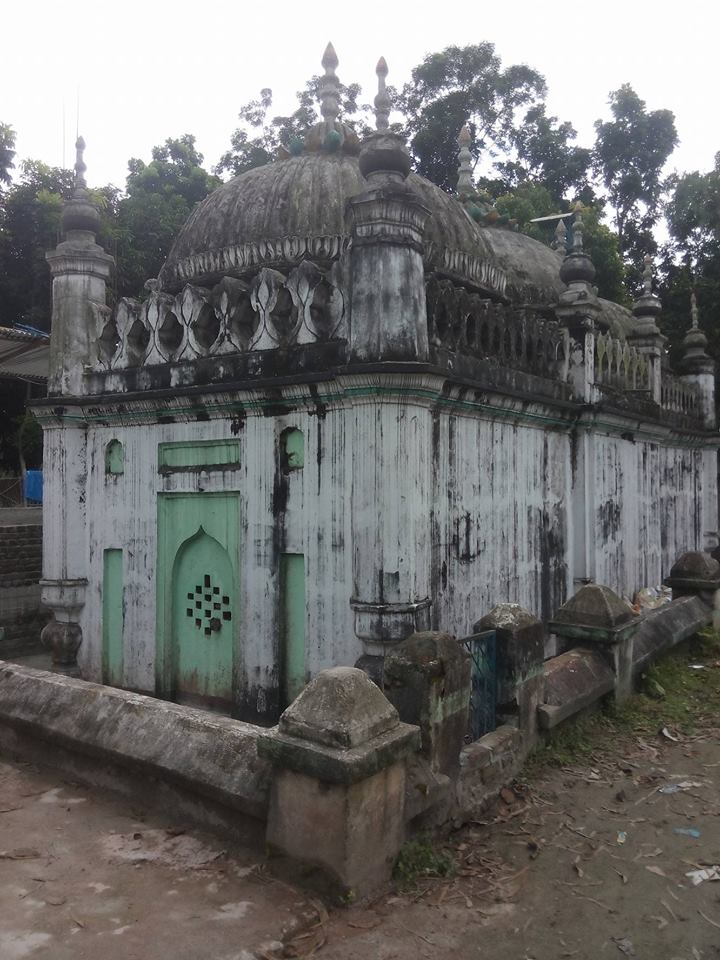
The mosque, from the north

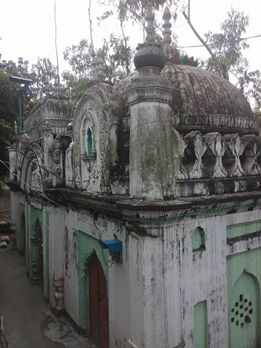
The mosque entrance

== See also ==
- Islam in Bangladesh
- List of mosques in Bangladesh
