= Chandamari Mosque =

Mosque in Rajarhat, Kurigram, Bangladesh

- চান্দামারী মন্ডলপাড়া জামে মসজিদ
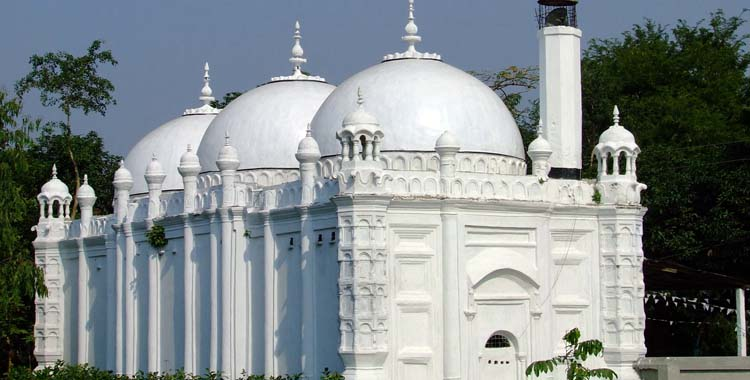
- The mosque in 2010

- Location of the mosque in Bangladesh

Religion
- Affiliation: Islam
- Ecclesiastical or organisational status: Mosque
- Status: Active

Location
- Location: Chandamari, Rajarhat Upazila, Kurigram District, Rangpur Division
- Country: Bangladesh
- Coordinates: 25°46′36″N 89°32′08″E

Architecture
- Type: Mosque architecture
- Style: Mughal
- Groundbreaking: 1584 CE
- Completed: 1680 CE

Specifications
- Capacity: 300 worshipers
- Length: 12 m (40 ft)
- Width: 6.1 m (20 ft)
- Dome: Three
- Minaret: Four
- Materials: Brick

The Chandamari Mosque, also known by its official name, the Chandamari Mondalpara Jame Mosque (Bengali: চান্দামারী মন্ডলপাড়া জামে মসজিদ), is a mosque, located in the village of Chandamari, in Rajarhat Upazila, in the Kurigram District of Bangladesh.

== Overview ==
It is believed that the Chandamari Mosque was constructed between 1584 and 1680 CE. The mosque is situated approximately 4 kilometres (2.5 mi) southwest of the upazila headquarters.

== History ==
There is no inscription regarding the construction of the mosque, but it is said that the mosque was built around 400 years ago during the Mughal period. Based on its architectural style and artistic features, it is estimated that the mosque was constructed between approximately 1584 and 1680 AD. The Chandamari Mosque bears significant resemblance to India's Babri Mosque and the Sixty Dome Mosque in Bagerhat. Even today, local residents as well as worshippers from distant places come to offer prayers at this mosque.

== Architecture ==
The Chandamari Mosque, along with a cemetery, occupies an area of 52 decimals. The entire structure of the mosque is 45 feet in length and 22 feet in width. It is surrounded by boundary walls and stands 60 feet tall. A sticky substance called "Viscas" was used in its construction. The front side of the mosque features three large doors, each 5 feet high. The mosque has three large domes, each with a radius of approximately 5.50 feet, adorned with intricate designs. At each of the four corners, there is a medium-sized minaret, and the structure is further embellished with sixteen smaller domes. Inside, there are three mihrabs. The walls of the mosque are decorated with numerous arches. Additionally, there is a window on the northern and southern sides for ventilation.

The architectural style of this mosque clearly reflects influences from both the Sultanate and Mughal periods.

== See also ==
- Islam in Bangladesh
- List of mosques in Bangladesh
