= Mawlana Bhasani Bridge =

Road bridge over the Teesta River in Rangpur Division, Bangladesh

Mawlana Bhasani Bridge মাওলানা ভাসানী সেতু
- Coordinates: 25°31′35″N 89°38′33″E
- Crosses: Teesta River, Rangpur
- Locale: Gaibandha District & Kurigram District
- Official name: Mawlana Bhasani Bridge
- Other name(s): Second Teesta Bridge; Haripur Bridge
- Maintained by: Local Government Engineering Department (LGED)

Characteristics
- Design: Pre-stressed concrete girder bridge, 31 spans
- Total length: 1,490 m
- Width: 9.60 m

History
- Opened: 20 August 2025

Statistics
- Toll: None (public road)

Location
- Interactive map of Mawlana Bhasani Bridge

Mawlana Bhasani Bridge (Bengali: মাওলানা ভাসানী সেতু), also known as the Second Teesta Bridge, is a road bridge in Rangpur Division spanning the Teesta River between Gaibandha and Kurigram districts. The bridge began operation on 20 August 2025, and was named in honor of the political leader Abdul Hamid Khan Bhashani.

== History ==
The Mawlana Bhasani Bridge project was implemented by the Local Government Engineering Department (LGED) of Bangladesh. It was planned and approved in 2014 to establish a connection between the Gaibandha District and Kurigram District. The project received financial assistance from the Saudi Fund for Development (SFD). The initial budget for this project was set at around ৳730 crore. Upon completion, the project's cost reached ৳925 crore. The total length of the bridge is approximately 1,490 meters, and it was constructed using a total of 155 pre-cast concrete girders. Each girder is about 46.5 meters long and weighs approximately 160 tons. The technology and structure used in the construction of the bridge follow modern engineering standards. China State Construction Engineering (CSCEC), a Chinese state-owned construction company, served as the main contractor for the bridge. By late 2024, approximately 85% of the construction work on the bridge was completed. In early 2025, the final girder installation and asphalt paving were finished and it was officially inaugurated in 20 August of the same year.
