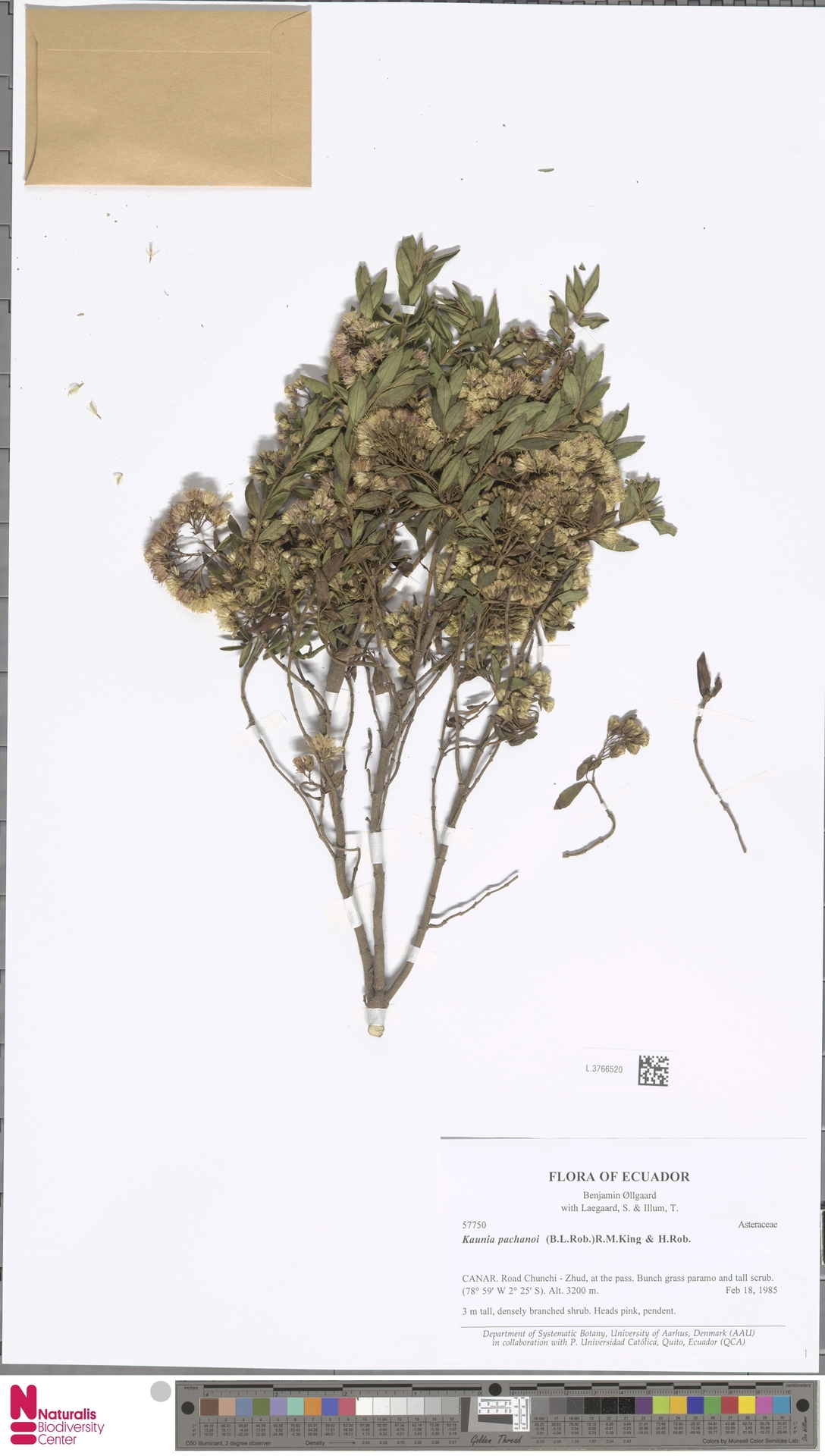

Conservation status
- Endangered (IUCN 3.1)

Scientific classification
- Kingdom: Plantae
- Clade: Tracheophytes
- Clade: Angiosperms
- Clade: Eudicots
- Clade: Asterids
- Order: Asterales
- Family: Asteraceae
- Genus: Kaunia
- Species: K. pachanoi

Binomial name
- Kaunia pachanoi (B.L.Rob.) R.M.King & H.Rob.

Synonyms
- Eupatorium pachanoi B.L.Rob.

= Kaunia pachanoi =

Species of flowering plant

Kaunia pachanoi is a species of flowering plant in the family Asteraceae. It is found only in Ecuador. Its natural habitats are subtropical or tropical moist montane forests and subtropical or tropical high-elevation grassland. It is threatened by habitat loss.
