= Kasim Uddin =

Bangladeshi bhawaiya songwriter and singer

Kasim Uddin কছিম উদ্দিন
- Died: 22 August 1992
- Citizenship: Bangladeshi
- Occupation: folk singer
- Known for: Prince of Bhawaiya

Kasim Uddin (Bengali: কছিম উদ্দিন; died 22 August 1992) was a veteran folk singer of Bangladesh of Bhawaiya genre. He is reckoned as the greatest Bhawaiya singer after Abbasuddin Ahmed. He is also addressed "The Prince of Bhawaiya". He is considered a cultural icon in Kurigram, where every year on his birth anniversary, 'Kasin Uddin Festival' of folk songs is organised.
