= Kurigram Government College =

Educational institution in Bangladesh

- কুড়িগ্রাম সরকারি কলেজ
- Logo of KGC
- Type: Public College
- Established: July 1, 1961; 65 years ago
- Academic affiliations: National University; Dinajpur Education Board (HSC)
- Chancellor: President Mirza Fakhrul Islam Alamgir
- Vice-Chancellor: A. S. M. Amanullah
- Principal: Mirza Nasir Uddin
- Academic staff: 70
- Students: 17,170
- Undergraduates: 13,020
- Postgraduates: 2,550
- Other students: 1600 (HSC)
- Location: Ulipur-Chilmari Road, Krishnapur, Kurigram, 5600, Bangladesh; 25.8042°N 89.6412°E
- Campus: 23.66 acres (9.57 ha); Urban
- Nickname: KGC
- Website: kurigramgc.college.gov.bd

Kurigram Government College (Bengali: কুড়িগ্রাম সরকারি কলেজ), located at the centre of Kurigram District headquarters is the only honors college in the district. It is also one of the famous colleges of northern Bangladesh. It offers HSC, three-year Bachelor and four-year Honors courses. The college is affiliated to the National University. Several thousand students study here. The college has two academic buildings and two hostels, one for male students and the other for female students.

== History ==
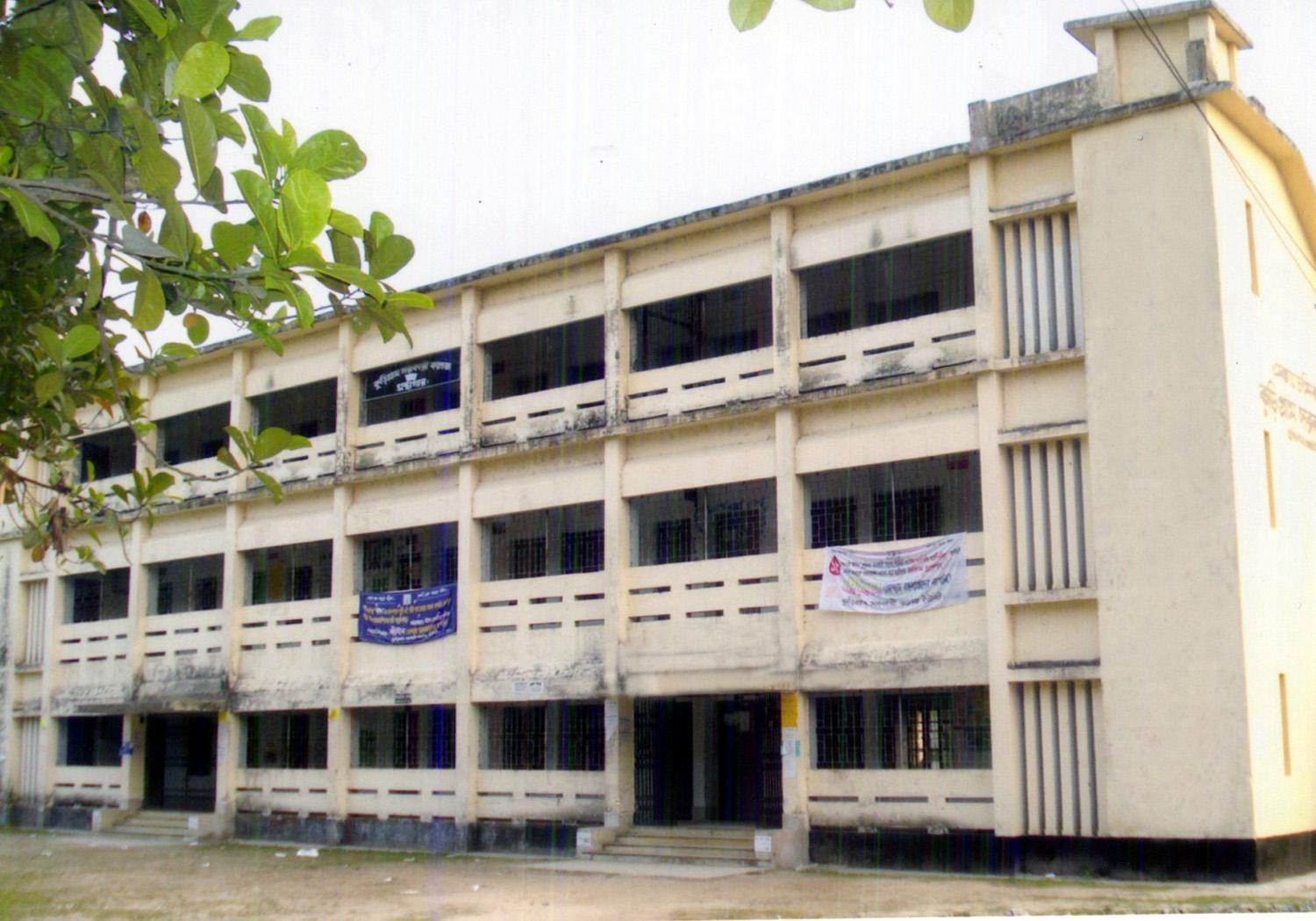
Academic Building

Kurigram College was established in 1961 by some local elite and educated people with the help of the then Mahakuma (District) commissioner, Salim Uddin Ahmed. Ex-minister and deputy speaker of the National Assembly, Mr. Riaz Uddin Ahmed Bhola Mia, Ahmad Ali Boksi, advocate Aman Ullah and other prominent persons were involved in the establishment process of the college.

The academic activities with the faculty of Arts and Commerce started in Kurigram High School and, after three or four months, it was shifted to its present location. Initially, Mr. Pranballav Kranjai managed the administration and high school teacher Khitindranath Roy worked as part-time lecturer. Prof. Kausar Ali, popularly known as K. Ali, joined the college as principal. On March 1, 1980 the college was nationalized and named Kurigram Government College. Eminent educationist Prof. Kazi Rafikul Haque was appointed principal immediately after nationalization.

== Campus ==
Kurigram College Campus

Kurigram Govt. College is in the heart of Kurigram district town. The college is easily accessible since the Kurigram-Chilmari (KC) Road runs by the college. It is surrounded by such buildings as District Administrator's Office, District Judge Court, Bangladesh Rifles (BDR) Office, Kurigram Govt. Boys High School, Kurigram Govt. Girls High School, District Health Complex, District Auditorium and the Stadium. The Dharla River and the Dharla Bridge are only 1 km from the campus.

== Academics ==
=== Bachelor Degree Honours ===
Faculties and departments

Faculty	Departments	Honr's	Masters Preli.	Master's final
Faculty of Science	Department of Physics	Yes	No	Yes
Faculty of Science	Department of Chemistry	Yes	No	Yes
Faculty of Science	Department of Mathematics	Yes	No	Yes
Faculty of Earth & Life Science	Department of Zoology	Yes	Yes	Yes
Faculty of Earth & Life Science	Department of Botany	Yes	Yes	Yes
Faculty of Arts	Department of Bengali	Yes	No	Yes
Faculty of Arts	Department of English	Yes	No	Yes
Faculty of Arts	Department of Philosophy	Yes	No	Yes
Faculty of Arts	Department of History	Yes	Yes	Yes
Faculty of Arts	Department of Islamic History & Culture	Yes	Yes	Yes
Faculty of Social Science	Department of Economics	Yes	No	Yes
Faculty of Social Science	Department of Political Science	Yes	Yes	Yes
Faculty of Business Studies	Department of Accounting	Yes	No	Yes
Faculty of Business Studies	Department of Management	Yes	Yes	Yes

=== Bachelor Degree (Pass) Courses ===
- B. A. (Pass)
- B. S. S. (Pass)
- B. Sc. (Pass)
- B. B. S. (Pass)
- C.C

=== Higher Secondary (HSC) ===
- Science
- Humanities
- Business Studies

== Students ==
As of 2024, the college has a total of 17,170 students. At the higher secondary level, a total of 1,600 students are receiving education, with 370 seats in the science department, 260 in the humanities department, and 200 in the commerce department, making a total of 830 seats.

- At the undergraduate (pass) level, there are 2,700 students.
- At the undergraduate (honors) level, there are 10,320 students.
- At the postgraduate level, there are 2,250 students.

== Results & Ranking ==
=== HSC Examination Results ===
From 2009 to 2024, a total of 7,457 students from the institution participated in the HSC examination. Among them, 6,293 students passed, while 1,164 failed. A total of 1,071 students achieved a GPA of 5 (A+). During this period, the average pass rate was 84.39%, and the GPA 5 achievement rate was 14.36%.

=== National University Ranking ===
In 2018, the college was recognized as one of the top ten colleges in the Rangpur region in the National University rankings.

== Notable alumni ==
- Bhupati Bhushan Barma, A Bhawaiya music artist.
- SM Abraham Lincoln, recipient of the Ekushey Padak and Independence Award.

== See more ==
- Rangpur Government College
