= Kurigram Agricultural University =

Public agricultural university in Kurigram, Bangladesh

- কুড়িগ্রাম কৃষি বিশ্ববিদ্যালয়
- Type: Public agricultural university
- Established: September 22, 2021
- Accreditation: UGC
- Chancellor: President Mirza Fakhrul Islam Alamgir
- Vice-Chancellor: Professor Dr. Md. Rashedul Islam
- Location: Kurigram, 5600, Bangladesh; 25.7926°N 89.6344°E
- Campus: 250 acres (100 ha); Rural
- Nickname: KuriAU
- Website: kuriau.edu.bd

Kurigram Agricultural University (Bengali: কুড়িগ্রাম কৃষি বিশ্ববিদ্যালয়) also known as KuriAU is a public agricultural university in Kurigram District, Bangladesh, established on 22 September 2021. 'Nalier Dola' is the designated site for permanent campus of Kurigram Agricultural University.

== History ==
Parliament passed the Kurigram Agricultural University Bill, 2021 in September 2021.

== List of vice-chancellors ==
- Professor Dr. Md. Rashedul Islam (2 December 2024 – present)
