= Bagua Anantapur =

Village of Kurigram District

Coordinates: 25°42′02″N 89°42′03″E

Bagua Anantapur (Bengali: বাগুয়া অনন্তপুর), also known as Bugwah, is a village in Hatia Union of Ulipur Upazila, Kurigram District, Rangpur Division, Bangladesh, located on the bank of Brahmaputra River river. Here, Anantapur Government Primary School and Bagua, Anantapur High School, founded in 1933.

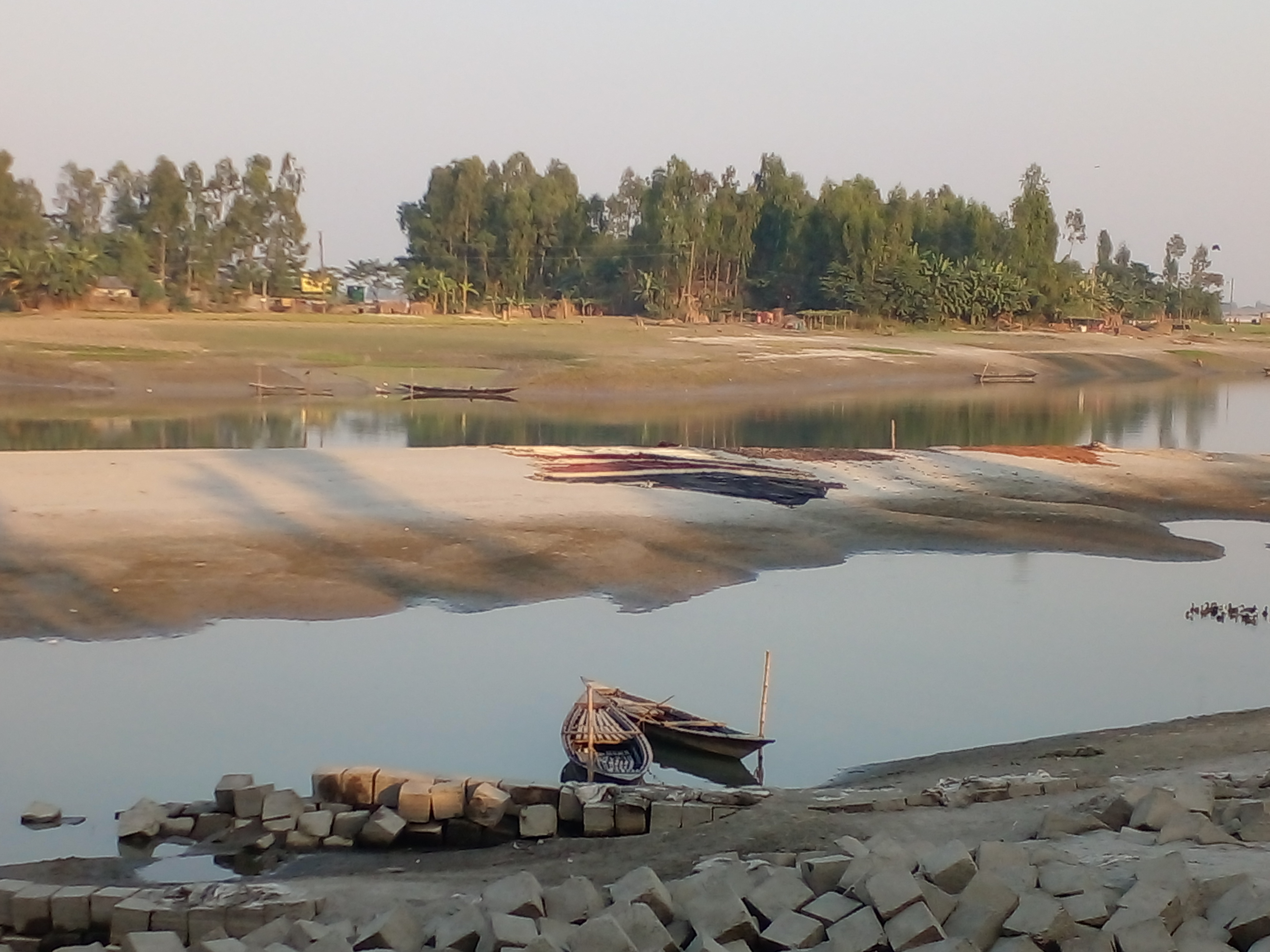
The natural view of Bagua Anantapur
