= Ahmed Nazmin Sultana =

Bangladeshi politician

Member of Bangladesh Parliament
- In office 2008–2014

Personal details
- Political party: Bangladesh Awami League

Ahmed Nazmin Sultana is a Bangladesh Awami League politician and a former member of parliament from a reserved seat.

== Early life ==
Sultana was born on 5 January 1961.

== Career ==
Sultana was elected to parliament from a reserved seat as a Bangladesh Awami League candidate in 2008. She was a member of the Parliamentary Standing Committee on Ministry of Agriculture.
