= Shahnaz Sardar =

Bangladeshi politician

- শাহনাজ় সরদার

Member of Bangladesh Parliament
- In office 1996–2001

Personal details
- Born: Bangladesh
- Party: Awami League

Shahnaz Sardar (Bengali: শাহনাজ় সরদার, Bengali pronunciation: [ʃaɦnaz ʃɔrdar]) is a Awami League politician who was a member of the Bangladesh Parliament from a reserved seat from 1996 to 2001.

== Career ==
Sardar was elected to parliament as an Awami League candidate in 1996 from reserved seat-03.
