= Mahbubul A Khalid =

Bangladeshi poet, musical composer (born 1967)

- মাহবুবুল এ খালিদ
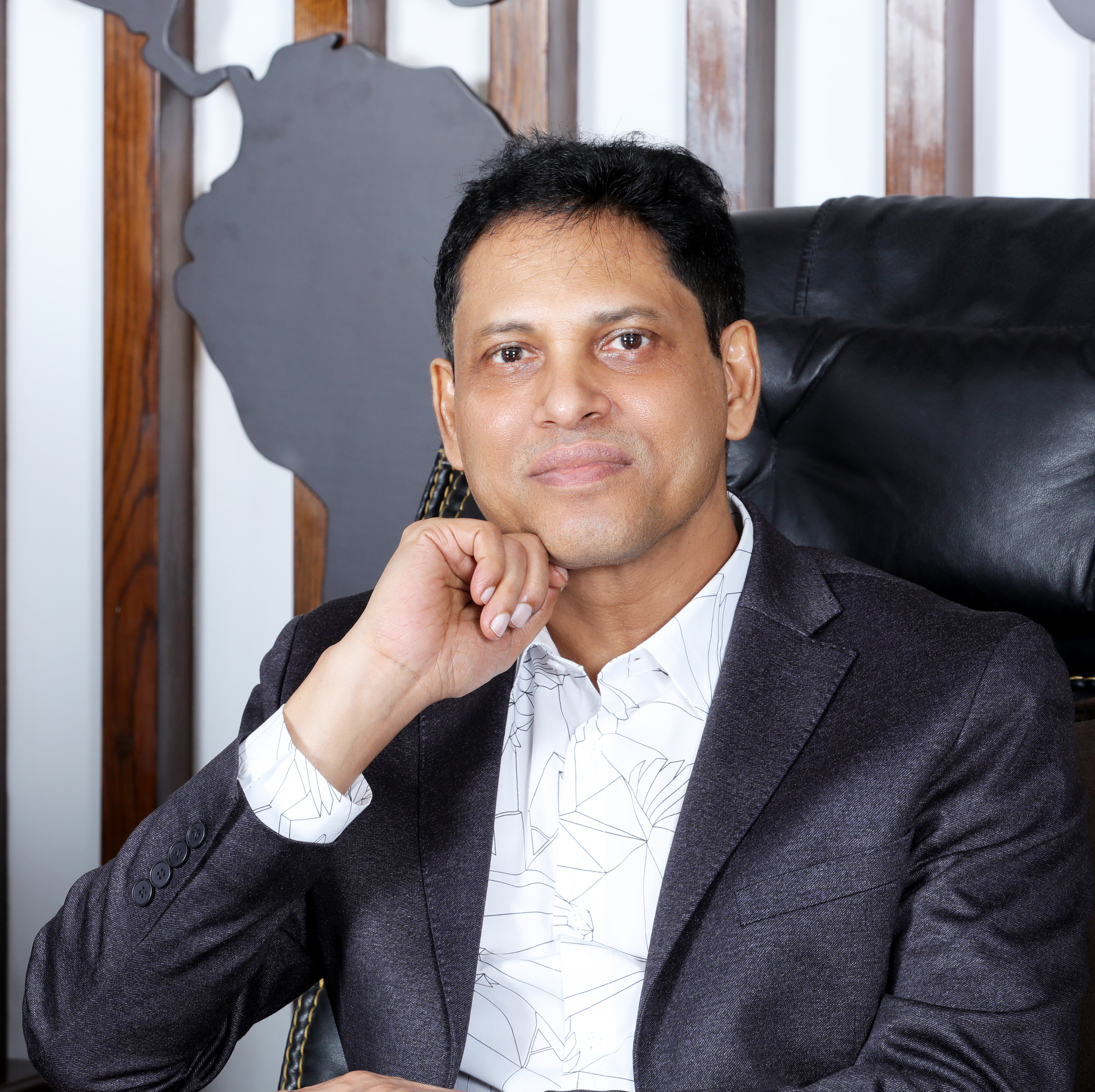
- Mahbubul A Khalid
- Occupations: Lyricist, composer
- Website: khalidsangeet.com

Mahbubul A Khalid is a Bangladeshi poet, lyricist and music composer.

== Songs ==
Many musicians composed the music of his songs including Ahmed Imtiaz Bulbul, Ibrar Tipu, Emon Saha, Kishor Das, and Atikur Rahman Roman.

Many singers rendered their voices to his songs among them Subir Nandi, Dinat Jahan Munni, Samina Chowdhury, Imran Mahmudul, Dilshad Nahar Kona, Salma Akhter, Rajib Hossain, and Konal.

Mahbubul A Khalid has written over 500 songs that have been published or recorded.
