= Nageshwari Upazila =

Upazila in Kurigram district

Nageswari নাগেশ্বরী
- Upazila
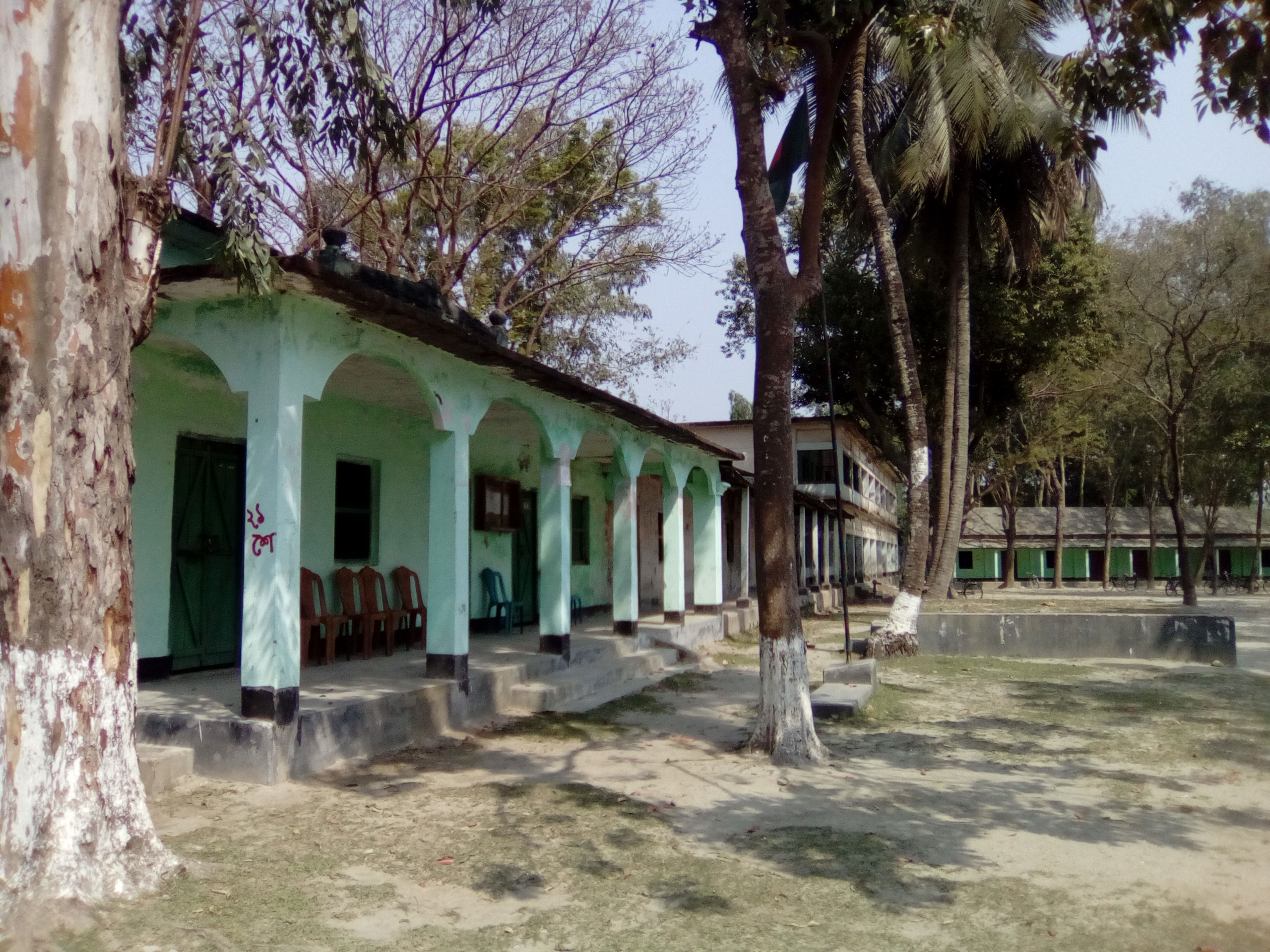
- Royganj M.L. High School, Nageswari upazila

- Coordinates: 25°58.8′N 89°42.5′E
- Country: Bangladesh
- Division: Rangpur
- District: Kurigram

Area
  - Total: 417.56 km^{2} (161.22 sq mi)

Population (2022)
  - Total: 444,699
  - Density: 1,065.0/km^{2} (2,758.3/sq mi)
- Time zone: UTC+6 (BST)
- Postal code: 5660
- Area code: 05826
- Website: Official Map of Nageshwari

Nageshwari Upazila mauza geocode map

Nageshwari (Bengali: নাগেশ্বরী) is an upazila of Kurigram District in the Division of Rangpur, Bangladesh located at 25.9792°N 89.7083°E.

== Demographics ==
Religions in Nageshwari Upazila (2022)
Religion	Percent
Islam	95.45%
Hinduism	4.54%
Other or not stated	0.01%

According to the 2022 Bangladeshi census, Nageshwari Upazila had 112,330 households and a population of 444,699. 10.53% of the population were under 5 years of age. Nageshwari had a literacy rate (age 7 and over) of 62.75%: 65.92% for males and 59.67% for females, and a sex ratio of 98.84 males for every 100 females. 111,201 (25.01%) lived in urban areas.

According to the 2011 Census of Bangladesh, Nageshwari Upazila had 94,108 households and a population of 394,258. 103,595 (26.28%) were under 10 years of age. Nageshwari had a literacy rate (age 7 and over) of 38.67%, compared to the national average of 51.8%, and a sex ratio of 1038 females per 1000 males. 62,289 (15.80%) lived in urban areas.

As of the 1991 Census of Bangladesh, Nageshwari has a population of 279,775. Males constitute are 50.72% of the population, and females 49.28%. Upazila's adult population is 131,990. Nageshwari has an average literacy rate of 19.4% (7+ years), compared to the national average of 32.4%.

== Administration ==
Nageshwari Thana, formed in 1793, was turned into an upazila on 15 April 1983.

The upazila is divided into Nageshwari Municipality and 14 union parishads: Bamondanga, Berubari, Bhitorbond, Bollobherkhas, Hasnabad, Kachakata, Kaligonj, Kedar, Narayanpur, Newashi, Noonkhawa, Raygonj, Ramkhana, and Sontaspur. The union parishads are subdivided into 79 mauzas and 350 villages.

Nageshwari Municipality is subdivided into 9 wards and 81 mahallas.

== See also ==
- Upazilas of Bangladesh
- Districts of Bangladesh
- Divisions of Bangladesh
