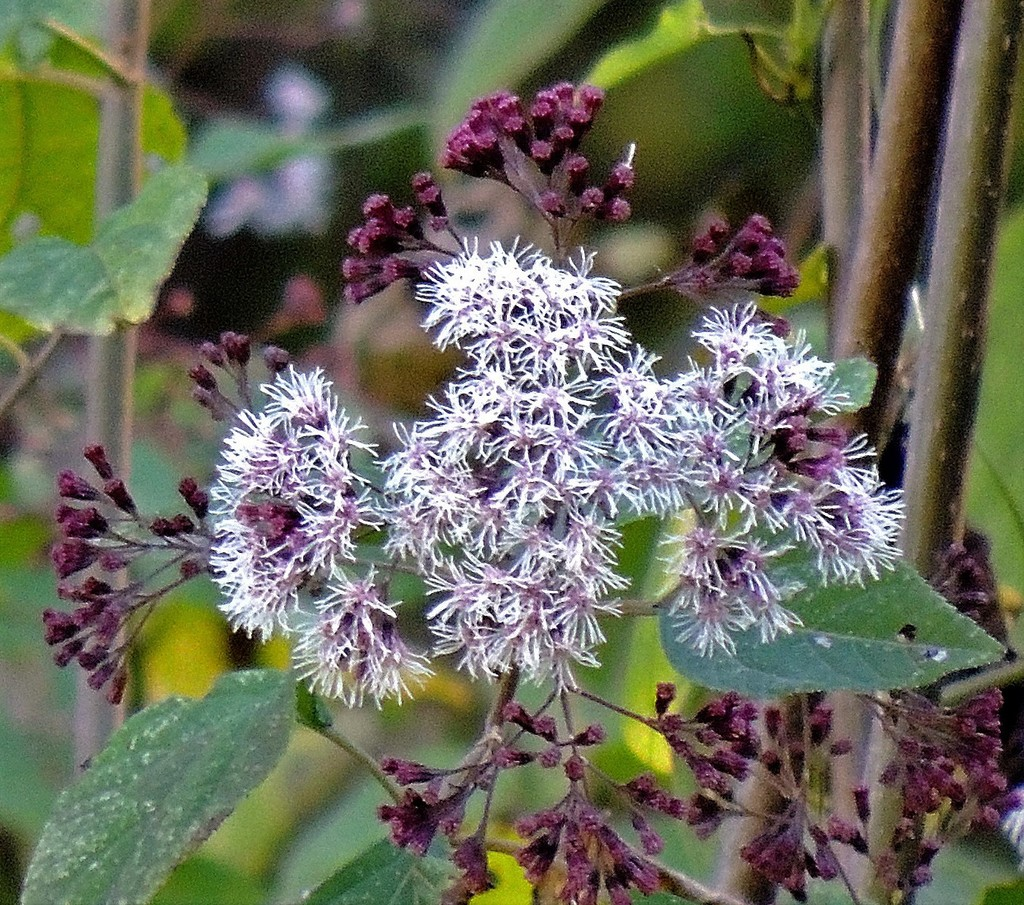
- Kaunia saltensis

Scientific classification
- Kingdom: Plantae
- Clade: Embryophytes
- Clade: Tracheophytes
- Clade: Spermatophytes
- Clade: Angiosperms
- Clade: Eudicots
- Clade: Asterids
- Order: Asterales
- Family: Asteraceae
- Subfamily: Asteroideae
- Tribe: Eupatorieae
- Genus: Kaunia; R.M.King & H.Rob.

Type species
- Eupatorium eucosmoides B.L.Rob.

= Kaunia =

Genus of shrubs

Kaunia is a genus of shrubs or small trees in the family Asteraceae. The species of the genus are found in South America with a range centered on Bolivia and also found in Argentina, southern Brazil, Peru and Ecuador.

The genus is named for Edward Kaun of Baltimore, Maryland, USA.

Species

- Kaunia camataguiensis (Hieron.) R.M.King & H.Rob.
- Kaunia endyta (B.L.Rob.) R.M.King & H.Rob.
- Kaunia eucosmoides (B.L.Rob.) R.M.King & H.Rob.
- Kaunia grossidentata (Hieron.) R.M.King & H.Rob.
- Kaunia gynoximorpha (Rusby ex B.L.Rob.) R.M.King & H.Rob.
- Kaunia gynoxioides Rusby
- Kaunia gynoxymorphum (B.L.Rob.) R.M.King & H.Rob.
- Kaunia hosanensis (B.L.Rob.) R.M.King & H.Rob.
- Kaunia ignorata (Hieron.) R.M.King & H.Rob.
- Kaunia lasiophthalma (Griseb.) R.M.King & H.Rob.
- Kaunia longipetiolata (Sch.Bip. ex Rusby) R.M.King & H.Rob.
- Kaunia pachanoi (B.L.Rob.) R.M.King & H.Rob.
- Kaunia rufescens (Lund ex DC.) R.M.King & H.Rob.
- Kaunia saltensis (Hieron.) R.M.King & H.Rob.
