= Rathindranath Roy =

Bangladeshi musician

- রথীন্দ্রনাথ রায়
- Education: Dhaka College; Dhaka University
- Occupation: Musician
- Parent: Horolal Roy
- Awards: Ekushey Padak

Rathindranath Roy is a Bangladeshi musician. He was a performer in Swadhin Bangla Betar Kendra. Roy sang Bhawaiya songs from the Rangpur area. He is also a playback singer. He has won awards like BACHSHASH (Bangladesh Cine Journalists Society) Award in 1979 and 1981, and Ekushey Padak in 1994.

== Early life and education ==
Roy passed SSC examination in 1966 and passed HSC from Dhaka College. He then enrolled into department of Bengali literature in the University of Dhaka in 1968.

== Career ==
Roy began his career as an artist in 1960. He became a regular singer on radio and television. He learnt music from his father Harolal Roy and PC Gomez. He performed in programs when he was a student of Dhaka University.

In 2002 he founded the Bhawaiya Academy in Rangpur. Now the institution has branches in Gaibandha, Kurigram and Lalmonirhat.

== Awards ==
- BACHSHASH (1979, 1981)
- Ekushey Padak (1994)
- Popular Folk Song Award in the World Youth Festival (East Germany, 1973)

== Personal life ==
Roy has been married to Sondhya Roy, a singer. They have two sons and a daughter, Chandra Roy, who is a singer as well. As of 2011 Roy has been living with his family in New York.
