= Badol Khondokar =

Bangladeshi film director and politician

- Born: 27 May 1960 (age 65)
- Occupations: Film director, film producer

Badol Khondokar (born 27 May 1960) is a Bangladeshi film director and producer.

== Biography ==
Khondokar was born on 27 May 1960. He directed films such as Swapner Prithibi, Prithibi Tomar Amar, Sagorika, Abar Ekti Juddho, Prem Korechhi Besh Korechhi and Bidrohi Padma. His last direction was Bidrohi Padma. It was released in 2006. He involved in producing films too.

Khondokar collected a nomination form for Kurigram-3 in 2013 for the Tenth Jatiya Sangsad Election. Later, he withdrew his nomination form. He is the cultural advisor of the central committee of the Jatiyo Party.

== Selected filmography ==
- Swapner Prthibi
- Bishwanetri
- Modhur Milon
- Prithibi Tomar Amar
- Sagorika
- Prem Korechhi Besh Korechhi
- Abar Ekti Juddho (2002)
- Bidrohi Padma
