= Dharla River =

Coordinates: 25°43′45″N 89°43′23″E

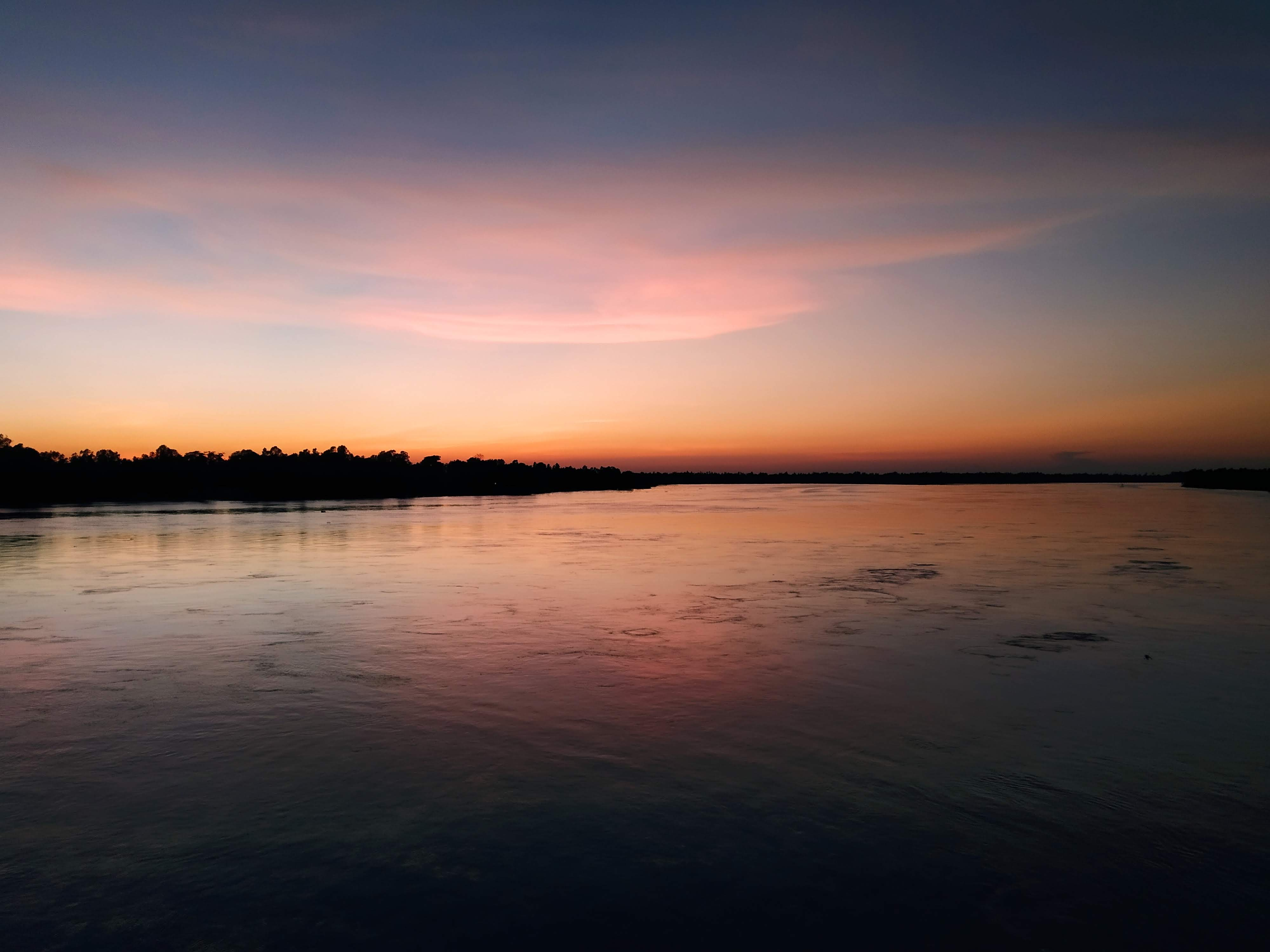

Location
- Countries: India, Bhutan and Bangladesh
- District: East Sikkim India, Samtse Bhutan, Kalimpong India, Jalpaiguri India, Cooch Behar India, Lalmonirhat Bangladesh, Kurigram Bangladesh.
- States: Sikkim India, West Bengal India, Paro Bhutan, Rangpur Bangladesh.

Physical characteristics
- Source: Kupup or Bitang Lake
  - location: Kupup or Bitang Lake, East Sikkim India
- Mouth: Jamuna River
  - location: Lalmonirhat District, Bangladesh

The Dharla River (Bengali: ধরলা নদী, romanized: Dhorola nodi) is a tributary of the Brahmaputra which is a trans-boundary river flowing through India, Bhutan and Bangladesh. It originates from Kupup/Bitang lake lying in Pangolakha Wildlife Sanctuary of East Sikkim in the Himalayas where it is known as the Jaldhaka River. It then flows through East Sikkim, India, crosses into Samtse District, Bhutan and returns to India again at Kalimpong district. From there, it flows through Jalpaiguri and Cooch Behar districts of West Bengal, India, one of the seven main rivers to do so. Here the river enters Bangladesh through the Lalmonirhat District and flows as the Dharla River until it empties into the Jamuna River near the Kurigram District. Near Patgram Upazila, it again flows easterly back into India. It then moves south and enters Bangladesh again through Phulbari Upazila of Kurigram District and continues a slow meandering course.

The average depth of river is 12 feet (3.7 m) and maximum depth is 39 feet (12 m), at its origin in Kurigram.

Erosion by the rivers Dharla and Jamuna took a serious turn in Lalmonirhat in 2007 when about 2 kilometres (1.2 mi) of a 7-kilometre (4.3 mi) long flood control embankment was devoured by the Dharla. Three mosques, two temples, a madrassah, a primary school, and a vast tract of cultivable land with crops were devoured by the river, rendering about three thousand people homeless.

There is a park beside the Dharla at Kurigram. There also is a bridge. The river is full during the monsoon season but has only knee-deep water in summer. Deposition of silt has led to the formation of many small islands (chars) in the river.

== Floods ==
River Dharla, along with River Teesta have been causing major flooding in Bangladesh during monsoon season between June and September.
