= Kanai Lal Sarker =

Bangladeshi politician

Member of the Bangladesh Parliament for Rangpur-15
- In office 7 April 1973 – 6 November 1975
- Preceded by: Constituency established
- Succeeded by: Md. Reazuddin Ahmed

Personal details
- Born: 1925 Anantapur, Bengal Presidency, British India
- Died: 1980 (aged 54–55)
- Party: Bangladesh Awami League

Kanai Lal Sarker (1925 – 1980) was a Bangladeshi politician from Kurigram belonging to the Bangladesh Awami League. He was a member of the Bangladesh Parliament.

== Biography ==
Sarker was born in 1925 in Anantapur village of what is now Hatia Union, Ulipur Upazila, Kurigram District, Bangladesh. His father was Rajnikant Sarkar.

He was elected to the East Pakistan Provincial Assembly in 1970. After the liberation of Bangladesh, he was elected to the Bangladesh Parliament from Rangpur-15 constituency in 1973.

Sarker died in 1980.
