= Phulbari, Taplejung =

Phulbari फूलबारी
- Village development committee
- Location in Nepal
- Coordinates: 27.31°N 87.66°E
- Country: Nepal
- Province: Province No. 1
- District: Taplejung District

Population (2011)
  - Total: 3,530
- Time zone: UTC+5:45 (Nepal Time)

Phulbari is a village development committee in the Himalayas of Taplejung District in the Province No. 1 of north-eastern Nepal. At the time of the 2011 Nepal census it had a population of 3,530 people living in 734 individual households. There were 1,675 males and 1,855 females at the time of census.
