= Phulbari, Dang =

Tulsipur Ward No. 13 (Phulbari) तुलसीपुर वडा नं १३ (फूलबारी)
- Ward
- Location in Nepal
- Coordinates: 28.0081°N 82.2797°E
- Country: Nepal
- Province: Lumbini Province
- District: Dang District
- Sub-Metropolitan City: Tulsipur
- Incorporated: 2017

Government
  - Type: Ward Committee
  - Chairperson: Mohanlal Paudel

Population (2021)
  - Total: 5,908
- Time zone: UTC+5:45 (Nepal Standard Time)

Tulsipur Ward No. 13 (Nepali: तुलसीपुर वडा नं १३), commonly known as Phulbari (Nepali: फूलबारी), is a ward of Tulsipur Sub-Metropolitan City in Dang District, Lumbini Province, Nepal.

== Geography ==
The ward is located in the inner Terai region of Dang Valley in western Nepal. It consists of rural and semi-urban settlements and is connected to central Tulsipur by local road networks.

== History ==
Phulbari was formerly a Village Development Committee (VDC). Following Nepal’s federal restructuring in 2017, it was incorporated as Ward No. 13 of Tulsipur Sub-Metropolitan City.

== Administration ==
Tulsipur Ward No. 13 is one of the 19 wards of Tulsipur Sub-Metropolitan City. Local administration is handled by the Ward Office, which provides civil registration, local development, and public services.

== Settlements ==
The ward includes several villages and hamlets, such as:

- Aamkholi
- Ambapur
- Amiltari
- Bakhariya
- Barhakhuti
- Gaikhuti
- Majhghatuwa
- Panalibot
- Raniyapur
- Sajkhuti

== Economy ==
The local economy is primarily based on agriculture, with residents engaged in farming and livestock rearing, typical of the Dang Valley region.

== Education ==
The ward is served by government and private schools providing primary and secondary education.

== Infrastructure ==
Basic infrastructure in the ward includes local roads, schools, health posts, and municipal services provided by Tulsipur Sub-Metropolitan City.

== See also ==
- Tulsipur Sub-Metropolitan City
- Dang District
