= Kanailal Sarkar (West Bengal politician) =

Indian physician and politician

- Born: 16 February 1911; Calcutta, West Bengal, British India
- Education: Chetla Boys' H. E. School; Asutosh College; St. Xavier's College; R. G. Kar Medical College (M.B.B.S.)
- Occupations: Pathologist, city councilor, legislator
- Employer: R. G. Kar Medical College
- Political party: United Citizens Municipal Association (1956-1962); United Citizens Front (1963-1972); Indian National Congress (1971-1980s)

Councilor
- In office 1956–1972

Member of Legislative Assembly
- In office 1971–1977

Councilor
- Incumbent
- Assumed office 1985

Kanailal Sarkar was an Indian physician and politician. He was councillor of the Calcutta Municipal Corporation and a member of the West Bengal Legislative Assembly, representing the Alipore constituency.

== Biography ==
Sarkar was born on 16 January 1911 in Calcutta and grew up on Aftab Mosque Lane. He attended Chetla Boys' H. E. School, Asutosh College. and St. Xavier's College before studying medicine at R. G. Kar Medical College, where he obtained an M.B.B.S. degree. Sarkar was active in the 1930 protest movement against British rule in India and was imprisoned. By the late 1940s, he was working as a Demonstrator of Pathology at R. G. Kar Medical College.

He was a councillor in the Calcutta Municipal Corporation from 1956 to 1972. In December 1962, as the United Citizens Municipal Association (the opposition bloc in the Calcutta Municipal Corporation) disintegrated in the wake of the Sino-Indian War, Sarkar was one of the councillors who took part in founding the United Citizens Front as a new opposition bloc. In the 8 April 1963 election for the mayor of Calcutta, he was the mayoral candidate of the United Citizens Front in the vote held among the aldermen and councillors of the city. He obtained 9 votes against 51 votes for the Indian National Congress candidate Chittaranjan Chatterjee. Sarkar was the chairman of the Standing Health and Bustee Improvement Committee of the Calcutta Municipal Corporation for 8 years and represented ward no. 78. He lived in the Chetla neighbourhood in Calcutta. He served as secretary of the Chetla Boys' High School and the Chetla Sree Arabinda Vidyapith, as well as President of the Chetla Girls' High School.

Sarkar was elected to the West Bengal Legislative Assembly in the 1971 and 1972 elections as the Indian National Congress candidate in the Alipore constituency. During the 1971 West Bengal Legislative Assembly, he was the chairman of the Committee of Estimates. He lost the Alipore seat in the 1977 West Bengal Legislative Assembly election, having stood as the Congress(I) candidate and finished in third place with 8,760 votes (18.10%). Sarkar was elected to the Calcutta Municipal Corporation in 1985 as the Congress(I) candidate from ward no. 74.
