= Bhawaiya =

Folk music from Bengal and Assam

Bhawaiya is a musical form or a popular folk music that originated in Northern Bengal, especially the Rangpur Division in Bangladesh, Cooch Behar district of West Bengal, India, and the undivided Goalpara district of Assam, India. It has recurrent themes of the "working class", mahouts, mahishals (buffalo herders), and gariyals (cart drivers). Lyrics express pangs of separation and loneliness of their womenfolk, with elongated tones accentuating pain, longing and "deep emotion". Bhawaiya is generally believed to have originated in the 16th century under Biswa Singha, and has evolved into stage performances since the 1950s. The lyrics of Bhawaiya songs are non-denominational. Bhawaiya is really popular during the Islamic occasions of Eid Al Fitr and Eid Al Adha.

== Etymology ==
There are various explanations of the meaning of Bhawaiya. Low-lying land with shrubs and other vegetables are called bhawa. According to some researchers, Bhawaiya is derived from the word Bawaiya, which is subsequently derived from the word bao (breeze). The derivative of the word Bhawaiya is Bhav > Bhao + Iya = Bhawaiya; the meaning of this word is emotionally charged. According to Abbasuddin Ahmed, this music is like the random and pleasant wind blowing from North Bengal called Bhawaiya. According to a survey taken of performers of Bhawaiya (conducted by the Folk Cultural and Tribal Cultural Centre, Government of West Bengal), the name is derived from the word Bhao, which was transformed into Bhav. These songs carry a deep emotion of biraha or separation and loneliness.

== Film ==
Bangladeshi film director Shahnewaz Kakoli's movie Uttarer Sur (Northern Symphony) is based on the life of a Bhawaiya singer and tells the story about the gradual demise of this music in the northern part of Bangladesh due to poverty. The movie was screened in the 18th Kolkata International Film Festival.

== Singers ==
- Abbasuddin Ahmed, credited with popularising Bhawaiya songs throughout Bangladesh.
- Pratima Barua Pandey, credited with popularizing Bhawaiya in Assam and the rest of India.
- Papon, credited with adapting Bhawaiya in popular music.
- Zubeen Garg, credited with adapting Bhawaiya in popular music.
- Kalpana Patowary, credited with adapting Bhawaiya in popular music.
- Rathindranath Roy, Bhawaiya singer of Bangladesh.
- Mahesh Chandra Roy, Bhawaiya singer of Bangladesh.

== Bibliography ==
- Dutta, Soumik (24 December 2019a). "The Solitude of Love: Nature, Culture and Womanhood in Bhawaiya Songs". Sahapedia. Archived from the original on 6 July 2020.
- Dutta, Soumik (24 December 2019b). "The Bhawaiya Musical Tradition of West Bengal". Sahapedia. Archived from the original on 7 July 2020.
- Sarma, Simona; Monteiro (2019). "Contemporary 'Folk' Dynamics: Shifting Visions and Meanings in the Goalpariya Folk Music of Assam". Folklore. 130 (4): 331–351. doi:10.1080/0015587X.2019.1622923. S2CID 213283007.
