= Kurigram =

City in northern Bangladesh

Kurigram কুড়িগ্রাম
- Pourashava, Town
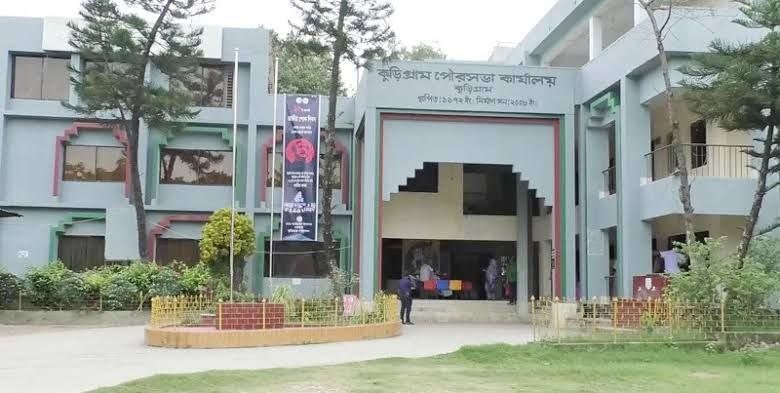
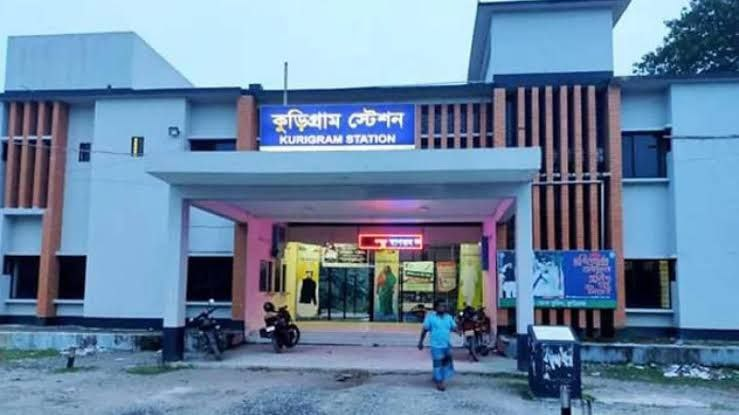
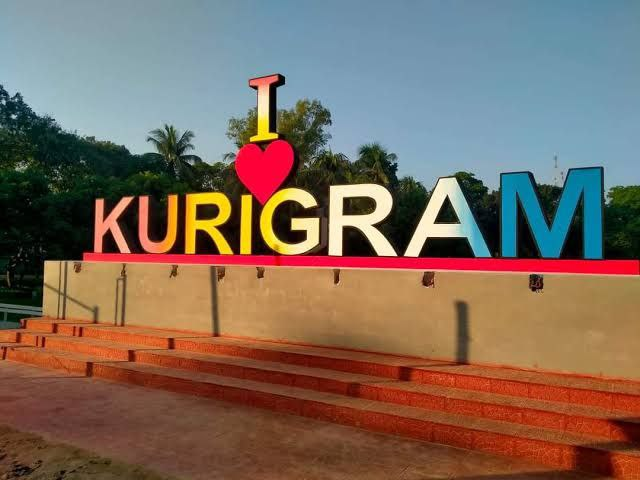
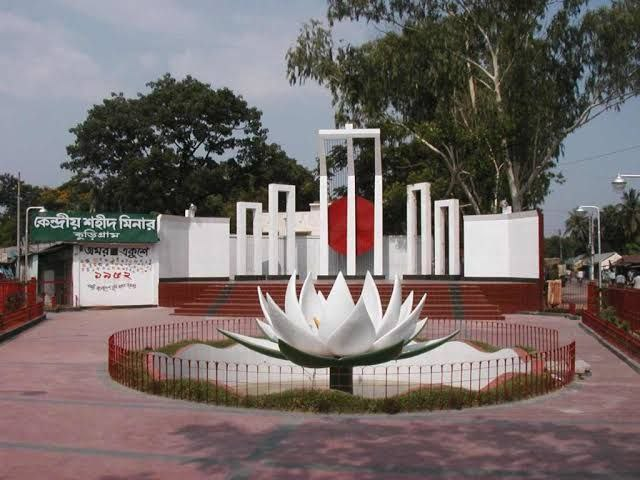
- From top (clockwise): Kuigram Municipality (Pourashava) office, Kurigram Railway station, I love kurigram Monument, Shapla Chattar

- Location in Rangpur Division, Bangladesh Location in Bangladesh Kurigram (Asia) Kurigram (Earth)
- Coordinates: 25.810347°N 89.648697°E
- Country: Bangladesh
- Division: Rangpur Division
- District: Kurigram District
- Pourashava: 1972

Government
  - Type: Mayor–Council

Area
  - Urban: 27.04 km^{2} (10.44 sq mi)

Population (2011)
  - Urban: 77,252
  - Urban density: 2.857/km^{2} (7.40/sq mi)

Languages
  - Official: Bengali • English
  - Native: Rangpuri
- Time zone: UTC+06:00 (BST)
- Postal code: 5600
- National calling code: +088
- Website: pourashava.kurigram.gov.bd

Kurigram is a city in northern Bangladesh. It is the headquarters of Kurigram District and Kurigram Sadar Upazila.

== Etymology ==
The original name of Kurigram was Kuriganj before it was renamed in 1984. The name Kurigram comes from Kuri and Gram, meaning "twenty" and "villages" in the Kol language respectively. The name of the district was changed to reflect shifting demographics since it originally consisted of twenty villages. In 1775 the population of Kurigram increased significantly and the district no longer consisted of only twenty villages.

== Geography ==
The town of Kurigram is located in the alluvial plain of Teesta-Brahmaputra basin at the bank of Dharla River. The average elevation of the town is 31 meters. Kurigram's humid subtropical climate (Köppen Cwa) is influenced by monsoons and features mild winters and extremely rainy and wet summers. The region surrounding the town is at risk of flooding due to the rivers' overflow during the intense monsoon rains because of its riverine terrain and relatively low elevation.

Climate data for Climate Data for Kurigram
Month	Jan	Feb	Mar	Apr	May	Jun	Jul	Aug	Sep	Oct	Nov	Dec	Year
Mean daily maximum °C (°F)	22 (72)	25 (77)	30 (86)	32 (90)	32 (90)	32 (90)	32 (90)	32 (90)	32 (90)	31 (88)	29 (84)	24 (75)	30 (86)
Daily mean °C (°F)	16.5 (61.7)	19 (66)	23.5 (74.3)	26.5 (79.7)	27.5 (81.5)	29 (84)	29 (84)	29 (84)	28.5 (83.3)	26.5 (79.7)	22.5 (72.5)	18.5 (65.3)	24.5 (76.1)
Mean daily minimum °C (°F)	11 (52)	13 (55)	17 (63)	21 (70)	23 (73)	26 (79)	26 (79)	26 (79)	25 (77)	22 (72)	17 (63)	12 (54)	20 (68)
Average precipitation mm (inches)	17.3 (0.68)	13 (0.5)	37 (1.5)	127 (5.0)	343 (13.5)	361 (14.2)	425 (16.7)	372 (14.6)	440 (17.3)	122 (4.8)	9.2 (0.36)	4.8 (0.19)	2,271.3 (89.33)

== Notable people ==
Rikta Akter Banu, was recognised as one of the BBC's 100 Women in 2024.

== Demographics ==
Religions in Kurigram (2011)
Religion	Percent
Islam	92.79%
Hinduism	7.14%
Other or not stated	0.07%

In 2011, Kurigram Municipality had 17,159 households and a population of 77,252. 15,083 (19.52%) were under 10 years of age. Kurigram had a literacy rate of 63.18% and a sex ratio of 963 females per 1000 males.
