= Elections in Bangladesh =

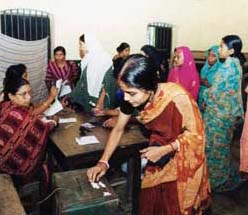
Scene from a polling booth in Bangladesh in 2004. The previous type of the ballot box is no longer in use.

Bangladesh elects on national level a legislature with one house or chamber. The unicameral Jatiya Sangsad, meaning national parliament, has 350 members of which 300 members are directly elected through a national election for a five-year term in single-seat constituencies while 50 memberships are reserved for the women who are selected by the ruling party or coalition. The prime minister is the head of the government. The president is the head of the state and is elected by the parliament. The president of Bangladesh is a ceremonial post and does not exercise any control over the running of the state.

Bangladesh has a two-party system that has evolved over time since the 1991 general election. Two political parties or coalitions dominate the elections, making it difficult for anybody to achieve electoral success under the banner of any other party. Since 2026, two dominant parties are Bangladesh Nationalist Party (BNP) and Bangladesh Jamaat-e-Islami.

== Historical overview ==
The Constitution of Bangladesh was adopted in 1972 and declared the as a parliamentary republic. However, in 1975, most of the executive powers were transferred to the presidency, reducing the Sangsad and the premiership to legislative powers only. This system was maintained until 1991, returning the state to parliamentary system. Since 1973, thirteen general elections and three presidential elections have been held by popular vote.

== General elections ==
=== Electoral system ===
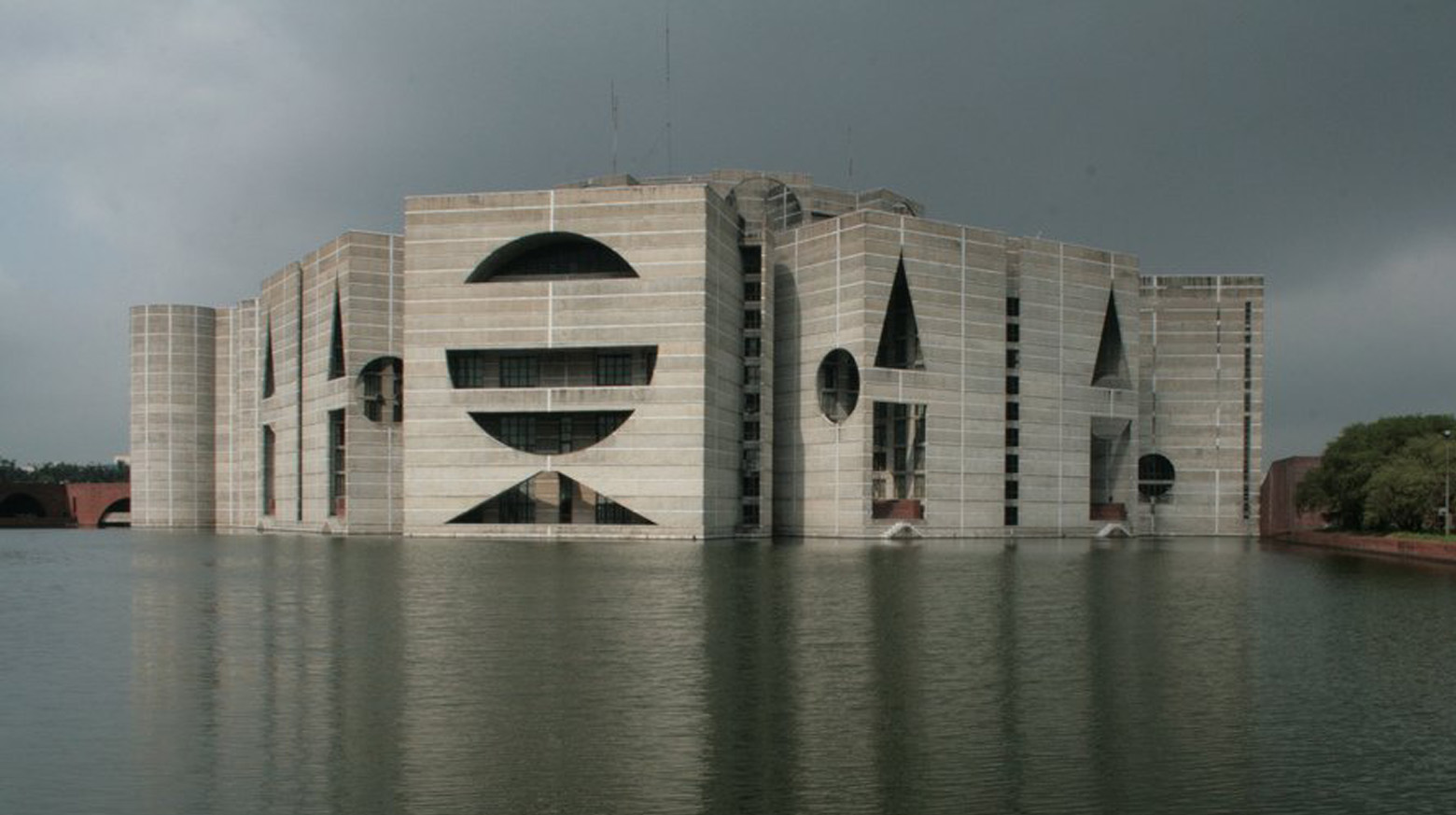
Jatiya Sangsad Bhaban

The Jatiya Sangsad consists of 350 members elected to five-year terms. Of that number, 300 are elected in single-member territorial constituencies according to the first-past-the-post (FPTP) electoral system. The remaining 50 seats are reserved for women, and are filled on the basis of proportional representation by a vote of the 300 members. The number of reserved seats has been revised over the years, increasing from 30 to 45 under the 8th parliament and 45 to 50 under the 9th parliament.

=== General elections ===
Since independence in 1971, thirteen general elections have been held in Bangladesh to elect members of the Jatiya Sangsad.

==== 1970 ====
1970 Pakistani general election

The 1970 Pakistani National Assembly election was held on 7 December 1970.

Vote share of different parties in the election.
1. AL (39.2%)
2. PPP (18.6%)
3. JI (6.03%)
4. CML (5.96%)
5. PML(Qa) (4.47%)
6. JUI (3.98%)
7. JUP (3.94%)
8. CML (3.34%)
9. NAP(W) (2.43%)
10. PDP (2.24%)
11. IND (7.04%)
12. Other Parties (2.76%)
Seat share of different parties in the election.
1. AL 53.35 (51.9%)
2. PPP 27.48 (26.8%)
3. PML(Qa) 2.87 (2.79%)
4. CML 2.23 (2.17%)
5. JUI 2.23 (2.17%)
6. NAP(W) 2.23 (2.17%)
7. JUP 2.23 (2.17%)
8. JI 1.28 (1.25%)
9. CML 0.63 (0.61%)
10. PDP 0.32 (0.31%)
11. IND 5.11 (4.97%)
12. Other Parties 2.76 (2.69%)

The government claimed a high level of public participation and a voter turnout of almost 63%. The total number of registered voters in the country was 56,941,500 of which 31,211,220 were from East Pakistan and 25,730,280 were from West Pakistan.

Party	Votes	%	Seats		
Party	Votes	%	General	Women	Total
All-Pakistan Awami League	12,937,162	39.20	160	7	167
Pakistan Peoples Party	6,148,923	18.63	81	4	85
Jamaat-e-Islami	1,989,461	6.03	4	0	4
Council Muslim League	1,965,689	5.96	7	0	7
Pakistan Muslim League (Qayyum)	1,473,749	4.47	9	1	10
Jamiat Ulema-e-Islam	1,315,071	3.98	7	0	7
Markazi Jamiat Ulema-e-Pakistan	1,299,858	3.94	7	0	7
Convention Muslim League	1,102,815	3.34	2	0	2
National Awami Party (Wali)	801,355	2.43	6	1	7
Pakistan Democratic Party	737,958	2.24	1	0	1
Jamiat Ulema-e-Islam (Thanvi)	521,764	1.58	0	0	0
Other parties	387,919	1.18	0	0	0
Independents	2,322,341	7.04	16	0	16
Total	33,004,065	100.00	300	13	313
Registered voters/turnout	56,941,500	–			
Source: Nohlen et al., Bangladesh Documents

1970 East Pakistan Provincial Assembly election

The 1970 East Pakistan Provincial Assembly election was held on 17 December 1970. The percentage of casting votes was (57.69%), and the number of reserved women seat was 10.

The All-Pakistan Awami League won a landslide victory of 288 seats. After claiming all ten seats reserved for women, it held 298 seats.

Party	Votes	%	Seats		
Party	Votes	%	General	Women	Total
All-Pakistan Awami League			288	10	298
Pakistan Democratic Party			2	0	2
National Awami Party (Wali)			1	0	1
Jamaat-e-Islami Pakistan			1	0	1
Nizam-e-Islam Party			1	0	1
Other parties and independents			7	0	7
Total			300	10	310
Registered voters/turnout	29,479,386	–			
Source: Baxter, Jhotpot Info, Banglapedia

==== 1973 ====
The 1973 general election was held on 7 March 1973. There were 15 seats reserved for women.

Party	Votes	%	Seats			
Party	Votes	%	General	Women	Total	+/–
Awami League	13,798,717	73.20	293	15	308	+10
National Awami Party (Muzaffar)	1,569,299	8.32	0	0	0	New
Jatiya Samajtantrik Dal	1,229,110	6.52	1	0	1	New
National Awami Party (Bhashani)	1,002,771	5.32	0	0	0	New
Bangladesh Jatiya League	62,354	0.33	1	0	1	+1
Bangla Jatiya League	53,097	0.28	0	0	0	New
Communist Party of Bangladesh	47,211	0.25	0	0	0	New
Sramik Krishak Samajbadi Dal	38,421	0.20	0	0	0	New
Bangladesh Communist Party (Leninist)	18,619	0.10	0	0	0	New
Bangladesh Shramik Federation	17,271	0.09	0	0	0	New
Banglar Communist Party	11,911	0.06	0	0	0	New
Bangla Chattra Union	7,564	0.04	0	0	0	New
Bangladesh Jatiya Congress	3,761	0.02	0	0	0	New
Jatiya Ganatantrik Dal	1,818	0.01	0	0	0	New
Independents	989,884	5.25	5	0	5	–2
Total	18,851,808	100.00	300	15	315	+5
Valid votes	18,851,808	97.53				
Invalid/blank votes	477,875	2.47				
Total votes	19,329,683	100.00				
Registered voters/turnout	35,205,642	54.91				
Source: Nohlen et al., Government of Bangladesh, Kumar Panday

==== 1979 ====
The 1979 general election was held on 18 February 1979. There were 30 seats reserved for women.

Party	Votes	%	Seats			
Party	Votes	%	General	Women	Total	+/–
Bangladesh Nationalist Party	7,934,236	41.17	207	30	237	New
Awami League	4,734,277	24.56	39	0	39	–269
Bangladesh Muslim League–Islamic Democratic League	1,941,394	10.07	20	0	20	New
Jatiya Samajtantrik Dal	931,851	4.83	8	0	8	+7
Awami League (Mizan)	535,426	2.78	2	0	2	New
National Awami Party (Muzaffar)	432,514	2.24	1	0	1	New
United Peoples' Party	170,955	0.89	0	0	0	New
Bangladesh Gono Front	115,622	0.60	2	0	2	New
National Awami Party (Nurur-Zahid)	88,385	0.46	0	0	0	New
Communist Party of Bangladesh	75,455	0.39	0	0	0	0
Communist Party of Bangladesh (Marxist–Leninist)	74,771	0.39	1	0	1	New
Bangladesh Jatiya League	69,319	0.36	2	0	2	+1
Jatiya Ekata Party	44,459	0.23	1	0	1	New
Bangladesh Ganatantrik Andolan	34,259	0.18	1	0	1	New
Jatiyatabadi Ganatantrik Dal	27,259	0.14	0	0	0	New
National Awami Party (Naser)	25,336	0.13	0	0	0	New
Bangladesh Janata Dal	18,748	0.10	0	0	0	New
National Republican Party for Parity	14,429	0.07	0	0	0	New
Jatiya Janata Party	10,932	0.06	0	0	0	New
Bangladesh Labour Party	7,738	0.04	0	0	0	New
People's Democratic Party	5,703	0.03	0	0	0	New
Sramik Krishak Samajbadi Dal	4,954	0.03	0	0	0	New
Bangladesh Democratic Party	3,564	0.02	0	0	0	New
Bangladesh Jatiya Mukti Party	3,363	0.02	0	0	0	New
Bangladesh Tanti Samity	1,834	0.01	0	0	0	New
Bangladesh Nizam-e-Islam Party	1,575	0.01	0	0	0	New
Gano Azadi League	1,378	0.01	0	0	0	New
United Republican Party	389	0.00	0	0	0	New
Bangladesh Ganatantrik Chashi Dal	130	0.00	0	0	0	New
Independents	1,963,345	10.19	16	0	16	+15
Total	19,273,600	100.00	300	30	330	+15
Valid votes	19,273,600	97.95				
Invalid/blank votes	402,524	2.05				
Total votes	19,676,124	100.00				
Registered voters/turnout	38,363,858	51.29				
Source: Nohlen et al., IPU, Government of Bangladesh

==== 1986 ====
The 1986 general election was held on 7 May 1986. There were 30 seats reserved for women.

Party	Votes	%	Seats			
Party	Votes	%	General	Women	Total	+/–
Jatiya Party	12,079,259	42.34	153	30	183	New
Awami League	7,462,157	26.16	76	0	76	+37
Bangladesh Jamaat-e-Islami	1,314,057	4.61	10	0	10	New
Jatiya Samajtantrik Dal (Rab)	725,303	2.54	4	0	4	New
Bangladesh Muslim League	412,765	1.45	4	0	4	+4
Oikya National Awami Party	369,824	1.30	5	0	5	+5
Communist Party of Bangladesh	259,728	0.91	5	0	5	+5
Jatiya Samajtantrik Dal (Siraj)	248,705	0.87	3	0	3	New
National Awami Party (Muzaffar)	202,520	0.71	2	0	2	+1
Bangladesh Krishak Sramik Awami League	191,107	0.67	3	0	3	New
Workers Party of Bangladesh	151,828	0.53	3	0	3	New
Bangladesh Khilafat Andolan	123,306	0.43	0	0	0	New
Jana Dal	98,100	0.34	0	0	0	New
Bangladesh Nagarik Sanghati	68,290	0.24	0	0	0	New
Islami Jukta Front	50,509	0.18	0	0	0	New
Jatiya Janata Party (Odud)	46,704	0.16	0	0	0	New
Bangladesh Samyabadi Dal (M-L)	36,944	0.13	0	0	0	New
Gano Azadi League	23,632	0.08	0	0	0	0
Bangladesh Islamic Andolan	22,931	0.08	0	0	0	New
Jamaaiatay Olamaya Islam	5,676	0.02	0	0	0	New
Jamaaiatay Olamaya Islam-Nizam-e-Islam Party	5,572	0.02	0	0	0	New
Pragotishil Jatiyatabadi Dal	2,997	0.01	0	0	0	New
Jatiya Janata Party (Sujat)	1,988	0.01	0	0	0	New
Bangladesh Jayita League	1,985	0.01	0	0	0	–2
Bangladesh Hindu Oikkya Front	1,338	0.00	0	0	0	New
Jatiyatabadi Ganatantrik Dal	149	0.00	0	0	0	0
Young Muslim Society	141	0.00	0	0	0	New
Bangladesh Islamic Republican Party	110	0.00	0	0	0	New
Independents	4,619,025	16.19	32	0	32	+16
Total	28,526,650	100.00	300	30	330	0
Valid votes	28,526,650	98.69				
Invalid/blank votes	377,209	1.31				
Total votes	28,903,859	100.00				
Registered voters/turnout	47,305,886	61.10				
Source: Nohlen et al., IPU, Government of Bangladesh

==== 1988 ====
The 1988 general election was held on 3 March 1988. There were 30 seats reserved for women.

Party	Votes	%	Seats	+/–
Jatiya Party	17,680,133	68.44	251	+98
Combined Opposition Party	3,263,340	12.63	19	New
Bangladesh Freedom Party	850,284	3.29	2	New
Jatiya Samajtantrik Dal (Siraj)	309,666	1.20	3	0
Bangladesh Khilafat Andolan	105,910	0.41	0	0
23-Party Alliance	102,930	0.40	0	New
Jana Dal	28,929	0.11	0	0
Ganatantra Bastabayan Party	4,209	0.02	0	New
Independents	3,487,457	13.50	25	–7
Total	25,832,858	100.00	300	0
Source: Nohlen, Government of Bangladesh

==== 1991 ====
The 1991 general election was held on 13 January 1991. There were 30 seats reserved for women.

Party	Votes	%	Seats			
Party	Votes	%	General	Women	Total	+/–
Bangladesh Nationalist Party	10,507,549	30.81	140	28	168	New
Awami League	10,259,866	30.08	88	0	88	New
Bangladesh Jamaat-e-Islami	4,136,661	12.13	18	2	20	New
Jatiya Party	4,063,537	11.92	35	0	35	–216
Bangladesh Krishak Sramik Awami League	616,014	1.81	5	0	5	New
Zaker Party	417,737	1.22	0	0	0	New
Communist Party of Bangladesh	407,515	1.19	5	0	5	New
Jatiya Samajtantrik Dal (Rab)	269,451	0.79	0	0	0	New
Islami Oikya Jote	269,434	0.79	1	0	1	New
National Awami Party (Muzaffar)	259,978	0.76	1	0	1	New
Jatiya Samajtantrik Dal (Inu)	171,011	0.50	0	0	0	New
Ganatantri Party	152,592	0.45	1	0	1	New
National Democratic Party	121,918	0.36	1	0	1	New
Bangladesh Janata Dal	120,729	0.35	0	0	0	New
United Communist League of Bangladesh	110,517	0.32	0	0	0	New
Bangladesh Khilafat Andolan	93,049	0.27	0	0	0	0
Freedom Party	90,781	0.27	0	0	0	–2
Jatiya Samajtantrik Dal (Siraj)	84,276	0.25	1	0	1	–2
Bangladesh Muslim League (Ainuddin)	66,575	0.20	0	0	0	New
Workers Party of Bangladesh	63,434	0.19	1	0	1	New
Bangladesh Samajtantrik Dal (Khaliquzzaman)	34,868	0.10	0	0	0	New
Bangladesh Muslim League (Kader)	32,693	0.10	0	0	0	New
Janata Mukti Party	30,962	0.09	0	0	0	New
Jatiya Ganotantrik Party	24,761	0.07	0	0	0	New
Bangladesh Islami Front	24,310	0.07	0	0	0	New
Jatiya Oikkya Front	21,624	0.06	0	0	0	New
Jatiya Janata Party–Ganatantrik Oikkya Jote	20,568	0.06	0	0	0	New
Jamaaiatay Olamaya Islam Front	15,073	0.04	0	0	0	New
Bangladesh Samajtantrik Dal (Mahbub)	13,413	0.04	0	0	0	New
Bangladesh Hindu League	11,941	0.04	0	0	0	New
Bangladesh Samyabadi Dal (Marxist-Leninist)	11,275	0.03	0	0	0	New
Oikkya Prakriyya	11,074	0.03	0	0	0	New
Bangladesh Muslim League (Matin)	11,073	0.03	0	0	0	New
National Awami Party (Bhashani)	9,129	0.03	0	0	0	New
Pragotishil Jatiyatabadi Dal	6,677	0.02	0	0	0	New
Sramik Krishak Samajbadi Dal	6,396	0.02	0	0	0	New
Jatiya Biplobi Front	3,671	0.01	0	0	0	New
Pragotishil Ganatantrik Sakt	3,598	0.01	0	0	0	New
Jatiya Janata Party (Ashraf)	3,187	0.01	0	0	0	New
Bangladesh Jatiya Tanti Dal	3,115	0.01	0	0	0	New
Bangladesh Muslim League (Yusuf)	2,757	0.01	0	0	0	New
Jatiya Jukta Front	2,668	0.01	0	0	0	New
Jatiya Janata Party (Asad)	1,570	0.00	0	0	0	New
Bangladesh National Congress	1,421	0.00	0	0	0	New
Jatiyatabadi Ganatantrik Chhashi Dal	1,317	0.00	0	0	0	New
Gano Azadi League (Samad)	1,314	0.00	0	0	0	New
Janasakti Party	1,263	0.00	0	0	0	New
Bangladesh Nezam-e-Islam Party	1,236	0.00	0	0	0	New
Islamic Samajtantrik Dal Bangladesh	1,039	0.00	0	0	0	New
Bangladesh Freedom League	1,034	0.00	0	0	0	New
Peoples Democratic Party	879	0.00	0	0	0	New
Bangladesh People's League (Goariobi Newaz)	742	0.00	0	0	0	New
Jatiya Mukti Dal	723	0.00	0	0	0	New
Bangladesh Jana Parishad	686	0.00	0	0	0	New
Muslim Peoples Party	515	0.00	0	0	0	New
Bangladesh Krishak Sramik Mukti Andolan	503	0.00	0	0	0	New
Bangladesh National Hindu Party	502	0.00	0	0	0	New
Jatiyatabadi Ganatantrik Dal	496	0.00	0	0	0	New
Democratic League	453	0.00	0	0	0	New
Humanitarian Organization for the Prevention of Smoking and Drug Abuse	453	0.00	0	0	0	New
Jatiya Tarun Sangha	417	0.00	0	0	0	New
Bangladesh Labour Party	318	0.00	0	0	0	New
Bangladesh Manobatabadi Dal	294	0.00	0	0	0	New
Ideal Party	251	0.00	0	0	0	New
National Awami Party (Sadequr Rahman)	248	0.00	0	0	0	New
Bangladesh Khilafat Party	241	0.00	0	0	0	New
Bangladesh Inquilab Party	214	0.00	0	0	0	New
Bangladesh Islamic Biplobi Parishad	202	0.00	0	0	0	New
Bangladesh Bekar Samaj	182	0.00	0	0	0	New
Bangladesh Adarsha Krishak Dal	154	0.00	0	0	0	New
Bangladesh Islamic Republican Party	138	0.00	0	0	0	New
Bangladesh Bekar Party	39	0.00	0	0	0	New
Jatiya Sramajibi Party	28	0.00	0	0	0	New
National Awami Party (Nur Mohammad Kazi)	27	0.00	0	0	0	New
Bangladesh Jatiya People's Party	25	0.00	0	0	0	New
Independents	1,497,396	4.39	3	0	3	–22
Total	34,103,777	100.00	300	30	330	+30
Valid votes	34,103,777	98.92				
Invalid/blank votes	374,026	1.08				
Total votes	34,477,803	100.00				
Registered voters/turnout	62,181,743	55.45				
Source: Nohlen et al., Bangladesh Election Commission, Kumar Panday

==== 1996 ====
Following boycotts by the main opposition party, the Bangladesh Awami League, the Bangladesh Nationalist Party won the uncontested February 1996 general election. However, amidst protests, they were made to cave in to Awami League's original demands, dissolve the parliament, and hold elections under a neutral caretaker government after the enactment of the 13th amendment.

Party	Votes	%	Seats			
Party	Votes	%	General	Women	Total	+/–
Bangladesh Nationalist Party			278	30	308	+140
Bangladesh Freedom Party			1	0	1	+1
Independents			10	0	10	+7
Vacant			11	0	11	–
Total			300	30	330	0
Total votes	11,776,481	–				
Registered voters/turnout	56,149,182	20.97				
Source: Nohlen et al., Kumar Panday

Bangladesh Awami League won the June 1996 general election for the first time since 1973 by forming a coalition government, since they fell 5 seats short of a majority.

Party	Votes	%	Seats			
Party	Votes	%	General	Women	Total	+/–
Awami League	15,882,792	37.44	146	27	173	New
Bangladesh Nationalist Party	14,255,986	33.61	116	0	116	–192
Jatiya Party	6,954,981	16.40	32	3	35	New
Bangladesh Jamaat-e-Islami	3,653,013	8.61	3	0	3	New
Islami Oikya Jote	461,517	1.09	1	0	1	New
Zaker Party	167,597	0.40	0	0	0	New
Jatiya Samajtantrik Dal (Rab)	97,916	0.23	1	0	1	New
Workers Party of Bangladesh	56,404	0.13	0	0	0	New
Gano Forum	54,250	0.13	0	0	0	New
Jatiya Samajtantrik Dal (Inu)	50,944	0.12	0	0	0	New
Communist Party of Bangladesh	48,549	0.11	0	0	0	New
Jamiat Ulema-e-Islam Bangladesh	45,585	0.11	0	0	0	New
Sammilita Sangram Parishad	40,803	0.10	0	0	0	New
Bangladesh Freedom Party	38,974	0.09	0	0	0	–1
Samridhya Bangladesh Andolon	27,083	0.06	0	0	0	New
Bangladesh Islami Front	23,696	0.06	0	0	0	New
Bangladesh Khilafat Andolan	18,397	0.04	0	0	0	New
Bangladesh Jatiyabadi Awami League	11,190	0.03	0	0	0	New
Islami Shasontontro Andolon	11,159	0.03	0	0	0	New
Bangladesher Samajtantrik Dal (Khalekuzzaman)	10,234	0.02	0	0	0	New
Bangladesh Samajtantrik Dal (Mahbub)	6,791	0.02	0	0	0	New
Bangladesh National Awami Party (NAP Bashani)	5,948	0.01	0	0	0	New
Bangladesh Muslim League (Jamir Ali)	4,580	0.01	0	0	0	New
Ganatantri Party	4,114	0.01	0	0	0	New
Bangladesh National Awami Party (NAP)	3,620	0.01	0	0	0	New
Democratic Republican Party	3,605	0.01	0	0	0	New
Bangladesh Janata Party	3,364	0.01	0	0	0	New
Jatiya Janata Party (Nurul Islam)	2,986	0.01	0	0	0	New
Jatiya Janata Party (Sheikh Asad)	2,395	0.01	0	0	0	New
Social Democratic Party	1,938	0.00	0	0	0	New
Bangladesh Gano Azadi League	1,683	0.00	0	0	0	New
Progotisil Jatiata Badi Dal	1,515	0.00	0	0	0	New
Hak Kathar Mancha	1,340	0.00	0	0	0	New
Bangladesh Samyabadi Dal (Marxist-Leninist)	1,148	0.00	0	0	0	New
Sramik Krishak Samajbadi Dal	964	0.00	0	0	0	New
Communist Kendra	888	0.00	0	0	0	New
Jatiya Biplobi Front	631	0.00	0	0	0	New
Saat Dalya Jote (Mirpur)	602	0.00	0	0	0	New
Bangladesh Hindu League	570	0.00	0	0	0	New
Bangladesh Peoples Party	558	0.00	0	0	0	New
Bangladesh Bekar Samaj	548	0.00	0	0	0	New
Bangladesh Tafsil Jati Federation (S.K. Mandal)	537	0.00	0	0	0	New
Desh Prem Party	532	0.00	0	0	0	New
Ganotantrik Sarbahara Party	502	0.00	0	0	0	New
Bangladesh Jatiya League (Sobhan)	418	0.00	0	0	0	New
Jana Dal	395	0.00	0	0	0	New
Jatiya Samajtantrik Dal (Mahiuddin)	393	0.00	0	0	0	New
Jatiya Seba Dal	365	0.00	0	0	0	New
National Democratic Party	353	0.00	0	0	0	New
Bangladesh Krisak Sramik Janata Party	294	0.00	0	0	0	New
Islami Al Zihad Dal	288	0.00	0	0	0	New
Bangladesh Sarbahara Party	248	0.00	0	0	0	New
Jatiya Daridra Party	244	0.00	0	0	0	New
Sramajibi Oikya Forum	229	0.00	0	0	0	New
Islamic Dal Bangladesh (Saifur)	221	0.00	0	0	0	New
Bangladesh People's League	213	0.00	0	0	0	New
Bangladesh Samajtantrik Samsad (Darshan Shava)	209	0.00	0	0	0	New
Bangladesh Krishak Sramik Mukti Andolon	189	0.00	0	0	0	New
Gano Oikkya Front (Guff)	186	0.00	0	0	0	New
Bangladesh Mehanati Front	173	0.00	0	0	0	New
Bangladesh Tafsili Federation (Sudir)	150	0.00	0	0	0	New
People's Muslim League	140	0.00	0	0	0	New
National Awami Party (NAP Bhashani)	138	0.00	0	0	0	New
Quran Dorshion Sangshta Bangladesh	137	0.00	0	0	0	New
Progatishil Gonotantrik Shakti	134	0.00	0	0	0	New
Bangladesh Islami Party	132	0.00	0	0	0	New
Bangladesh Jatiya Agragati Party	131	0.00	0	0	0	New
Oikya Prokria	112	0.00	0	0	0	New
Bangladesh Bashani Adarsha Bastabayan Parishad	107	0.00	0	0	0	New
Bangladesh Bastuhara Parishad	105	0.00	0	0	0	New
Bangladesh National Congress	99	0.00	0	0	0	New
Quran Sunna Bastabayan Party	82	0.00	0	0	0	New
Bangladesh Tanjimul Muslimin	81	0.00	0	0	0	New
Samridhya Bangladesh Babosai Samproday	48	0.00	0	0	0	New
Bashani Front	45	0.00	0	0	0	New
Bangladesh Krishak Raj Islami Party	33	0.00	0	0	0	New
National Patriotic Party	31	0.00	0	0	0	New
Bangladesh Islami Biplobi Parishad	29	0.00	0	0	0	New
Taherikay Olama-e-Bangladesh	29	0.00	0	0	0	New
United Peoples' Party	26	0.00	0	0	0	New
Bangladesh Manabodjikar Dal	20	0.00	0	0	0	New
Independents	449,618	1.06	1	0	1	–9
Total	42,418,274	100.00	300	30	330	0
Valid votes	42,418,274	98.92				
Invalid/blank votes	462,302	1.08				
Total votes	42,880,576	100.00				
Registered voters/turnout	56,716,935	75.60				
Source: ECB, Kumar Panday

==== 2001 ====
BNP won two-thirds majority in the parliament and won the 2001 general election.

Party	Votes	%	Seats
Bangladesh Nationalist Party	22,833,978	40.97	193
Awami League	22,365,516	40.13	62
Islami Jatiya Oikya Front	4,038,453	7.25	14
Bangladesh Jamaat-e-Islami	2,385,361	4.28	17
Bangladesh Jatiya Party	621,772	1.12	4
Islami Oikya Jote	376,343	0.68	2
Krishak Sramik Janata League	261,344	0.47	1
Jatiya Party (Manju)	243,617	0.44	1
Jatiya Samajtantrik Dal	119,382	0.21	0
Communist Party of Bangladesh	56,991	0.10	0
Workers Party of Bangladesh	40,484	0.07	0
Bangladesh Islami Front	30,761	0.06	0
BASAD–Khalekuzzaman	21,164	0.04	0
Jamiat Ulema-e-Islam Bangladesh	19,256	0.03	0
Bangladesh Khilafat Andolan	13,472	0.02	0
Gano Forum	8,494	0.02	0
Islami Shasantantra Andolon	5,944	0.01	0
Liberal Party Bangladesh	3,976	0.01	0
National Awami Party (NAP)	3,801	0.01	0
Bangladesh Progressive Party	3,734	0.01	0
Ganatantri Party	3,190	0.01	0
Bangladesh Samajtantrik Dal	2,308	0.00	0
Bangladesh Janata Party	1,703	0.00	0
Bangladesh Krishak Sramik Mukti Andolon	1,248	0.00	0
Zaker Party	1,181	0.00	0
Bangladesh Peoples Congress	1,155	0.00	0
Communist Kendra	1,042	0.00	0
Communist Party of Bangladesh (Marxist–Leninist)	972	0.00	0
Bangladesh Hindu League	922	0.00	0
Gano Azadi League	780	0.00	0
Jatiyo Janata Party (Adv. Nurul Islam Khan)	657	0.00	0
Bangladesh Muslim League (Jamir Ali)	582	0.00	0
National Patriotic Party	551	0.00	0
National Awami Party (Bhashani)	442	0.00	0
Bangladesh Jatiya Tanti Dal	441	0.00	0
Samridha Bangladesh Andolon	429	0.00	0
Sramik Krishak Samajbadi Dal	391	0.00	0
Bangladesh Peoples Party	382	0.00	0
Desh Prem Party	366	0.00	0
Democratic Republican Party	364	0.00	0
Bangladesh Manabadhikar Dal	237	0.00	0
Bangladesh Krisak Sramik Janata Party	197	0.00	0
Liberal Democrats Party	170	0.00	0
Quran Darshan Sangstha Bangladesh	161	0.00	0
Jatiya Janata Party (Sheik Asad)	148	0.00	0
Pragatishil Ganotantrik Shakti	136	0.00	0
Sama-Samaj Ganotantri Party	131	0.00	0
National Awami Party (NAP-Bhashani Mushtaq)	79	0.00	0
Quran and Sunnah Bastabayan Party	77	0.00	0
Bhashani Front	76	0.00	0
Bangladesh Krishak Sramik Awami League	59	0.00	0
Bangladesh Bhashani Adarsha Bastabayan Parishad	58	0.00	0
Bangladesh Sarbahara Party	44	0.00	0
Jatiya Janata Party (Hafizur)	30	0.00	0
Independents	2,262,073	4.06	6
Total	55,736,625	100.00	300
Valid votes	55,736,625	99.20	
Invalid/blank votes	449,082	0.80	
Total votes	56,185,707	100.00	
Registered voters/turnout	74,946,364	74.97	
Source: ECB

==== 2008 ====
Bangladesh Awami League won two-thirds majority in the parliament and won the 2008 general election.

Seats won by alliance (left) and party (right)
Party or alliance		Votes	%	Seats			
Party or alliance		Votes	%	General	Women	Total	+/–
Grand Alliance	Awami League	33,634,629	48.04	230	36	266	+204
Grand Alliance	Jatiya Party (Ershad)	4,926,360	7.04	27	4	31	+17
Grand Alliance	Jatiya Samajtantrik Dal	506,605	0.72	3	0	3	+3
Grand Alliance	Workers Party of Bangladesh	262,093	0.37	2	0	2	+2
Grand Alliance	Liberal Democratic Party	191,679	0.27	1	0	1	New
Grand Alliance	Total	39,521,366	56.45	263	40	303	+227
Four Party; Alliance	Bangladesh Nationalist Party	22,757,101	32.50	30	5	35	–158
Four Party; Alliance	Bangladesh Jamaat-e-Islami	3,289,967	4.70	2	0	2	–15
Four Party; Alliance	Bangladesh Jatiya Party	173,292	0.25	1	0	1	–3
Four Party; Alliance	Islami Oikya Jote	108,415	0.15	0	0	0	–2
Four Party; Alliance	Total	26,328,775	37.61	33	5	38	–178
Islami Andolan Bangladesh		658,254	0.94	0	0	0	0
Jamiat Ulema-e-Islam Bangladesh		175,245	0.25	0	0	0	0
Bikalpa Dhara Bangladesh		146,827	0.21	0	0	0	New
Zaker Party		134,933	0.19	0	0	0	0
Jatiya Ganotantrik Party		107,796	0.15	0	0	0	New
Krishak Sramik Janata League		102,879	0.15	0	0	0	–1
Gano Forum		72,911	0.10	0	0	0	0
Communist Party of Bangladesh		42,331	0.06	0	0	0	0
Socialist Party of Bangladesh		38,643	0.06	0	0	0	0
Jatiya Samajtantrik Dal (Rab)		37,350	0.05	0	0	0	New
Bangladesh Islami Front		31,785	0.05	0	0	0	0
Khelafat Majlish		27,921	0.04	0	0	0	New
Bangladesh National Awami Party		24,141	0.03	0	0	0	New
Bangladesh Kalayan Party		21,609	0.03	0	0	0	New
Bangladesh Tarikat Federation		19,905	0.03	0	0	0	New
Bangladesh Khilafat Andolan		16,944	0.02	0	0	0	0
Progressive Democratic Party		14,228	0.02	0	0	0	New
National People's Party		10,348	0.01	0	0	0	New
Bangladesh Jatiya Party		8,383	0.01	0	0	0	New
Jatiya Party (Manju)		7,818	0.01	0	0	0	–1
Bangladesh NAP		4,365	0.01	0	0	0	New
People's Front		4,009	0.01	0	0	0	New
United Citizens Movement		3,542	0.01	0	0	0	New
Ganatantri Party		2,550	0.00	0	0	0	0
Revolutionary Workers Party of Bangladesh		2,021	0.00	0	0	0	New
Bangladesh Muslim League		1,113	0.00	0	0	0	0
Islamic Front Bangladesh		1,020	0.00	0	0	0	New
Bangladesh Freedom Party		566	0.00	0	0	0	New
Communist Party of Bangladesh (ML)		297	0.00	0	0	0	0
Independents		2,060,392	2.94	4	0	4	–2
None of the above		381,924	0.55	–	–	–	–
Total		70,012,191	100.00	300	45	345	+45
Valid votes		70,012,191	99.10				
Invalid/blank votes		636,294	0.90				
Total votes		70,648,485	100.00				
Registered voters/turnout		81,087,003	87.13				
Source: ECB, Asian Tribune

==== 2014 ====
In the 2014 general election the Awami League was declared victors in 127 of the 154 uncontested seats by default on 5 January 2014. Of the remaining uncontested seats, the Jatiya Party led by Rowshan Ershad won 20, the JSD won three, the Workers Party won two and the Jatiya Party (Manju) won one.

As a result of violence and the opposition boycott voter turnout in Dhaka was 22%. Results of 139 seats out of 147 were released, with the Awami League winning 105, the Jatiya Party winning 13, the Workers Party winning four, the JSD winning two and the Tarikat Federation and BNF winning one each. The remaining 8 constituencies election were suspended due to violence and re-election to be held. The newly elected MPs were sworn in on 9 January.

Party	Votes	%	Seats		
Party	Votes	%	General	Women	Total
Awami League	12,357,374	72.14	234	39	273
Jatiya Party	1,199,727	7.00	34	6	40
Workers Party of Bangladesh	359,620	2.10	6	1	7
Jatiya Samajtantrik Dal	203,799	1.19	5	1	6
Bangladesh Tarikat Federation	177,449	1.04	2	0	2
Jatiya Party (Manju)	124,389	0.73	2	0	2
Bangladesh Nationalist Front	107,990	0.63	1	0	1
Bangladesh National Awami Party	7,120	0.04	0	0	0
Khelafat Majlish	5,725	0.03	0	0	0
Gano Front	2,717	0.02	0	0	0
Bangladesh Islami Front	2,585	0.02	0	0	0
Ganatantri Party	2,031	0.01	0	0	0
Independents	2,579,324	15.06	16	3	19
Total	17,129,850	100.00	300	50	350
Valid votes	17,129,850	98.49			
Invalid/blank votes	263,037	1.51			
Total votes	17,392,887	100.00			
Registered voters/turnout	43,943,184	39.58			
Source: Parliament, Election Commission, IPU

==== 2018 ====
The 2018 general election held on 30 December 2018, voter turnout was 80%. Bangladesh Awami League under the leadership of Prime Minister Sheikh Hasina won their 4th term as the ruling party with 302 seats. The Jatiya Party became the main opposition party with only 26 seats.It was one of the debated,corrupted election in Bangladesh.

Party	Votes	%	Seats			
Party	Votes	%	General	Women	Total	+/–
Awami League (Note: The voting figures of the Awami League do not include the votes for 13 candidates of allied registered parties who contested on the Awami League 'boat' symbol) (Note: Bangladesh Jatiya Samajtantrik Dal's Mayeen Uddin Khan Badal ran as an Awami League candidate in Chittagong-8 and won the seat with 282,313 votes.)	63,805,379	74.96	257	43	300	+27
Bangladesh Nationalist Party (Note: The voting figures of the BNP do not include the votes for 25 candidates of allied registered parties who contested on the BNP 'sheaf of paddy' symbol)	9,985,202	11.73	6	1	7	+7
Jatiya Party	4,443,351	5.22	24	4	28	–12
Islami Andolan Bangladesh	1,255,373	1.47	0	0	0	–
Workers Party of Bangladesh (Note: WPB fielded three candidates on its 'hammer' election symbol, who received 1,729 votes, and five candidates on the Awami League 'boat' symbol, who received 644,335 votes.)	646,064	0.76	2	1	3	–4
Jatiya Samajtantrik Dal (Note: JASAD fielded nine candidates on its 'torch' election symbol, who received 39,104 votes, and three candidates on the Awami League 'boat' symbol, who received 570,940 votes.)	610,044	0.72	2	0	2	–4
Bikalpa Dhara Bangladesh (Note: Bikalpdhara Bangladesh fielded 23 candidates on its 'winnowing fan' election symbol, who received 18,183 votes, and three candidates on the Awami League 'boat' symbol, who received 547,757 votes.)	565,940	0.66	2	0	2	+2
Gano Forum (Note: GaFo fielded twenty candidates on its 'rising sun' election symbol, who received 103,535 votes, and seven candidates on the BNP 'sheaf of paddy' symbol, who received 398,202 votes.)	501,737	0.59	2	0	2	+2
Bangladesh Tarikat Federation (Note: Bangladesh Tarikat Federation fielded 16 candidates on its 'winnowing fan' election symbol, who received 6,087 votes, and two candidates on the Awami League 'boat' symbol, who received 423,868 votes.)	429,955	0.51	1	0	1	–1
Jamiat Ulema-e-Islam Bangladesh (Note: JUIB fielded five candidates on its 'date palm' election symbol, who received 2,351 votes, and three candidates on the BNP 'sheaf of paddy' symbol, who received 215,658 votes.)	218,009	0.26	0	0	0	–
Jatiya Party (Manju)	182,611	0.21	1	0	1	–1
Jatiya Samajtantrik Dal (Rab) (Note: JSD fielded fifteen candidates on its 'star' election symbol, who received 3,119 votes, and four candidates on the BNP 'sheaf of paddy' symbol, who received 152,867 votes.)	155,986	0.18	0	0	0	–
Krishak Sramik Janata League (Note: KSJL fielded five candidates on its 'gamchha' election symbol, who received 597 votes, and three candidates on the BNP 'sheaf of paddy' symbol, who received 143,518 votes.)	144,115	0.17	0	0	0	–
Khelafat Majlish (Note: KM fielded ten candidates on its 'wall-clock' election symbol, who received 11,203 votes, and two candidates on the BNP 'sheaf of paddy' symbol, who received 105,907 votes.)	117,110	0.14	0	0	0	–
Zaker Party	109,440	0.13	0	0	0	–
Bangladesh Islami Front	60,372	0.07	0	0	0	–
Communist Party of Bangladesh	55,421	0.07	0	0	0	–
Liberal Democratic Party (Note: LDP fielded four candidates on its 'umbrella' election symbol, who received 25,152 votes, and four candidates on the BNP 'sheaf of paddy' symbol, who received 28,879 votes.)	54,031	0.06	0	0	0	–
Bangladesh Kalyan Party (Note: BKP fielded one candidate on its 'wrist-watch' election symbol, who received 55 votes, and one candidate on the BNP 'sheaf of paddy' symbol, who received 44,381 votes.)	44,436	0.05	0	0	0	–
Bangladesh Jatiya Party (Note: BJP fielded two candidates on its 'cow cart' election symbol, who received 111 votes, and one candidate on the BNP 'sheaf of paddy' symbol, who received 38,639 votes.)	38,750	0.05	0	0	0	–
National People's Party	36,611	0.04	0	0	0	–
Islamic Front Bangladesh	31,468	0.04	0	0	0	–
Revolutionary Workers Party of Bangladesh (Note: Unregistered member political parties of the Left Democratic Alliance, like the Ganasamhati Andolan, fielded candidates on RWPB's 'hoe' election symbol.)	18,043	0.02	0	0	0	–
Socialist Party of Bangladesh	17,591	0.02	0	0	0	–
Bangladesh Muslim League (Note: Some unregistered political parties, most notably the Nationalist Democratic Movement (NDM) led by Bobby Hajjaj, contested under Muslim League's 'lantern' election symbol. The alliance of these parties held the name 'Gano Oikya Jote' (lit. Mass Unity Alliance).)	15,116	0.02	0	0	0	–
Bangladesh Nationalist Front	13,289	0.02	0	0	0	–1
Islami Oikya Jote	11,328	0.01	0	0	0	–
Bangladesh Khilafat Andolan	9,796	0.01	0	0	0	–
Bangladesh National Awami Party	8,367	0.01	0	0	0	–
Progressive Democratic Party	6,113	0.01	0	0	0	–
Gano Front	5,277	0.01	0	0	0	–
Bangladesh National Awami Party-Bangladesh NAP	5,176	0.01	0	0	0	–
Bangladesh Jatiya Party (Mukit)	4,606	0.01	0	0	0	–
Jatiya Ganotantrik Party	3,798	0.00	0	0	0	–
Bangladesh Khelafat Majlish	2,899	0.00	0	0	0	–
Ganatantri Party	1,641	0.00	0	0	0	–
Bangladesh Cultural Liberation Front (Muktijote)	1,219	0.00	0	0	0	–
Communist Party of Bangladesh (M-L)	387	0.00	0	0	0	–
Bangladesh Muslim League-BML	228	0.00	0	0	0	–
Independents	1,498,152	1.76	3	1	4	–15
Total	85,114,431	100.00	300	50	350	0
Valid votes	85,114,431	98.97				
Invalid/blank votes	887,690	1.03				
Total votes	86,002,121	100.00				
Registered voters/turnout	104,142,381	82.58				

==== 2024 ====
The 2024 general election held on 7 January 2024, voter turnout was 40%. Bangladesh Awami League under the leadership of Prime Minister Sheikh Hasina won their 5th term as the ruling party with 223 seats with two other parties (Jatiya Party and Trinomool BNP) securing 6 seats. Other than the political parties, Independents won a total of 63 seats.

Summary table of the results of 2024 Bangladeshi general election
Party	Seats				Votes		
Party	General	Women	Total	Net	#	%	±pp
Bangladesh Awami League (Note: 6 candidates from other affiliate parties also contested with the Awami League's symbol Boat, who received 392,528 votes. Among those six, 2 got elected, one each from the Workers Party of Bangladesh and the Jatiya Samajtantrik Dal.) (Note: Based on the general seats won, the Awami League was supposed to get 37 reserved seats for women on a proportional basis. However, when all winning independent candidates from general seats gave support to the Awami League for the reserved women's seats election, the party fielded candidates for a total 48 seats— incorporating the seats strength of the independents.) (Note: Among the Awami League's officially nominated 48 candidates for the women reserved seats, 1 candidate (Kanan Ara Begum) was from the affiliate Ganatantri Party. However, she remained as an Awami League nominated member in official state records and functionality.)	224	47	271	▼29	32,113,540	65.15	▼9.81
Jatiya Party (Ershad)	11	2	13	▼15	2,179,673	4.42	▼0.80
Workers Party of Bangladesh (Note: Workers Party of Bangladesh fielded a total 26 candidates. Among them, 24 (92.31%) contested with their party's symbol Hammer and received 99,378 votes (39.40%). The other 2 (7.69%) coalition candidates contested with the Awami League's Boat symbol and received 152,835 votes (60.60%).)	1	0	1	▼2	252,213	0.51	▼0.25
Jatiya Samajtantrik Dal (Inu) (Note: Jatiya Samajtantrik Dal (Inu) fielded a total 66 candidates. Among them, 63 (95.45%) contested with their party's symbol Torch and received 62,361 (26.95%). The other 3 (4.55%) coalition candidates contested with the Awami League's Boat symbol and received 169,012 votes (73.05%).)	1	0	1	▼1	231,373	0.47	▼0.25
Bangladesh Kallyan Party (Ibrahim)	1	0	1	▲1	94,332	0.19	▲0.14
Ganatantri Party	0	1	1	▲1	6,772	0.01	▲0.01
Bangladesh Nationalist Movement	0	0	0	New entry	157,573	0.32	New entry
Trinomool BNP	0	0	0	New entry	139,829	0.28	New entry
Zaker Party	0	0	0	0	89,394	0.18	▲0.05
Krishak Sramik Janata League	0	0	0	0	88,854	0.18	▲0.01
Bangladesh Congress	0	0	0	New entry	88,613	0.18	New entry
Jatiya Party (Manju) (Note: Jatiya Party (Manju) fielded a total 13 candidates. Among them, 12 (92.31%) contested with their party's symbol Bicycle and received 10,438 votes (12.87%). The other 1 (7.69%) coalition candidate contested with the Awami League's Boat symbol and received 70,681 (87.13%).)	0	0	0	▼1	81,119	0.16	▼0.05
National People's Party (Nilu)	0	0	0	0	79,550	0.16	▲0.12
Bangladesh Islami Front	0	0	0	0	77,631	0.16	▲0.09
Islami Oikya Jote (Amini)	0	0	0	0	60,414	0.12	▲0.11
Islamic Front Bangladesh	0	0	0	0	56,025	0.11	▲0.05
Bangladesh Supreme Party	0	0	0	New entry	55,407	0.11	New entry
Bangladesh Sangskritik Muktijote	0	0	0	0	31,624	0.06	▲0.06
Bangladesh Nationalist Front	0	0	0	0	27,454	0.06	▲0.04
Bangladesh Tarikat Federation	0	0	0	▼1	24,219	0.05	▼0.46
Bikalpa Dhara Bangladesh (Badruddoza)	0	0	0	▼2	22,979	0.05	▼0.61
Bangladesh Khilafat Andolan	0	0	0	0	11,846	0.02	▲0.01
Gano Front	0	0	0	0	10,929	0.02	▲0.01
Gono Forum (Kamal)	0	0	0	▼2	9,964	0.02	▼0.57
Bangladesh National Awami Party (Muzaffar)	0	0	0	0	2,480	0.01	0.00
Communist Party of Bangladesh (M.L.) (Barua)	0	0	0	0	1,836	0.00	0.00
Bangladesh Jatiya Party (Matin)	0	0	0	0	1,494	0.00	▼0.01
Bangladesh Muslim League (Kamaruzzaman)	0	0	0	0	762	0.00	0.00
Independent(s)	62	0	62	▲58	13,295,218	26.97	▲25.21
Total	300	50	350	—	49,293,117	100.0	—
Valid votes					49,293,117	98.02	▼0.95
Invalid votes					995,641	1.98	▲0.95
Total votes					50,288,758	100.0	—
Registered voters/Turnout					119,691,633 (Note: This figure is the final voter count previously disclosed by the EC. The party-wise results are the sums of the constituency-wise results published by the EC; therefore if the voter counts are aggregated from those same seat-wise results, the total number of voter stands at 119,686,373. Even in that case, the voter turnout is roughly 42.02%.)	42.02	▼40.56

==== 2026 ====
The BNP won a landslide victory in the election, securing 211 of the 299 published seats outright, while its allied parties secured 3 seats. The Jamaat-e-Islami came second, securing 68 seats, the highest ever number of seats in its history, while its allies secured 9 seats. Although BNP won, it still used a Vote buying tactic to secure the seats in the parliament. The success of the BNP has been attributed to the absence of AL in the election and party's familiarity and perceived experience among the voters, as well as voter's concern for the rise of right-wing politics, while Jamaat mostly won in the constituencies adjacent to western Indian borders, which has been attributed mainly to the anti-India sentiment in the area.

Party or alliance		Seats
Party or alliance		General
BNP+	Bangladesh Nationalist Party	209
BNP+	Gono Odhikar Parishad	1
BNP+	Ganosanhati Andolan	1
BNP+	Bangladesh Jatiya Party	1
BNP+	Total	212
11 Parties	Bangladesh Jamaat-e-Islami	68
11 Parties	National Citizen Party	6
11 Parties	Bangladesh Khelafat Majlis	2
11 Parties	Khelafat Majlis	1
11 Parties	Total	77
Islami Andolan Bangladesh		1
Independents		7
Vacant		3
Total		300
Source: The Daily Star

== Presidential elections ==
In 1974, the president was elected by the National Assembly with only one candidate on the ballot, before a new constitution was adopted in 1975 for the president to be elected by popular vote. There were three such elections, in 1978, 1981 and 1986. After the constitutional reform in 1991, the President was elected by the parliament.

Following constitutional reform and a return to a parliamentary democracy in 1991, the office of the President has been largely a ceremonial one. The President is elected by a vote in the Jatiya Sangsad. A Presidential term is for five-years, although they remain in office until their successor is elected. Elections under this system have taken place in 1991, 1996, 2001, 2002, 2009, 2013, 2018 and 2023.

=== 1978 ===
The 1978 Bangladeshi presidential elections were held on 3 June 1978. They were the first direct elections for the post President, as the post had previously been elected by the Jatiya Sangsad. The result was a victory for Ziaur Rahman, who won 76.6% of the vote. Turnout was 54.3%.

Candidate	Party	Votes	%
Ziaur Rahman	Bangladesh Jatiyatabadi Front	15,733,807	76.6
M. A. G. Osmani	Ganatantrik Oikkya Jote	4,455,200	21.7
Eight other candidates		342,554	1.7
Invalid/blank votes		354,010	–
Total		20,885,571	100

=== 1981 ===
The 1981 Bangladeshi presidential elections were held on 15 November 1981. The result was a victory for the incumbent acting President Abdus Sattar of the Bangladesh Nationalist Party (BNP), who received 65.5% of the vote, beating his principal challenger Kamal Hossain of the Awami League. Voter turnout was 54.3%.

Candidate	Party	Votes	%
Abdus Sattar	Bangladesh Nationalist Party	14,203,958	65.5
Kamal Hossain	Bangladesh Awami League	5,636,113	26.0
Maulana Mohammudullah	Independent	388,741	1.8
M. A. G. Osmani	Independent	293,637	1.4
M. A. Jalil	Jatiya Samajtantrik Dal	248,769	1.1
Muzaffar Ahmed	NAP (M)-CPB	224,18	1.0
33 other candidates		682,154	3.2
Invalid/blank votes		332,524	–
Total		22,010,084	100

=== 1986 ===
The 1986 Bangladeshi presidential elections were held on 15 October 1986. The result was a victory for incumbent Hussain Muhammad Ershad, who had assumed the office in 1983 following a military coup. Ershad reportedly won 84.1% of the vote with a voter turnout of 54.9%. However the elections were controversial as they were boycotted by all major opposition candidates and there were reports of irregularities.

Candidate	Party	Votes	%
Hussain Muhammad Ershad	Jatiya Party	21,795,337	84.1
Mauluna Mohammadullah	Independent	1,510,456	5.8
Syed Faruque Rahman	Bangladesh Freedom Party	1,202,303	4.6
Nine other candidates		1,408,195	5.4
Invalid/blank votes		380,745	–
Total		26,297,337	100

== See also ==
- Bangladesh Election Commission
- List of parliamentary constituencies of Bangladesh
