= List of presidents of Bangladesh =

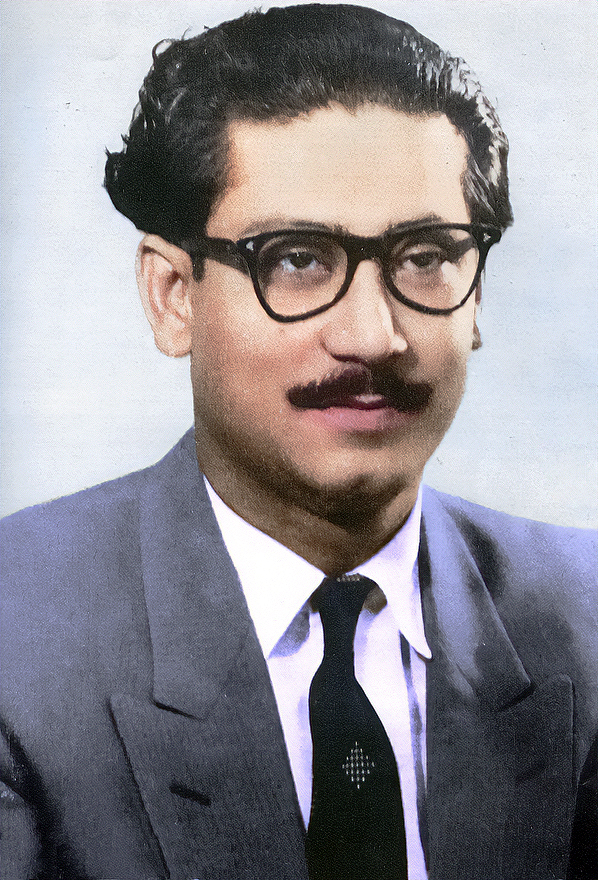
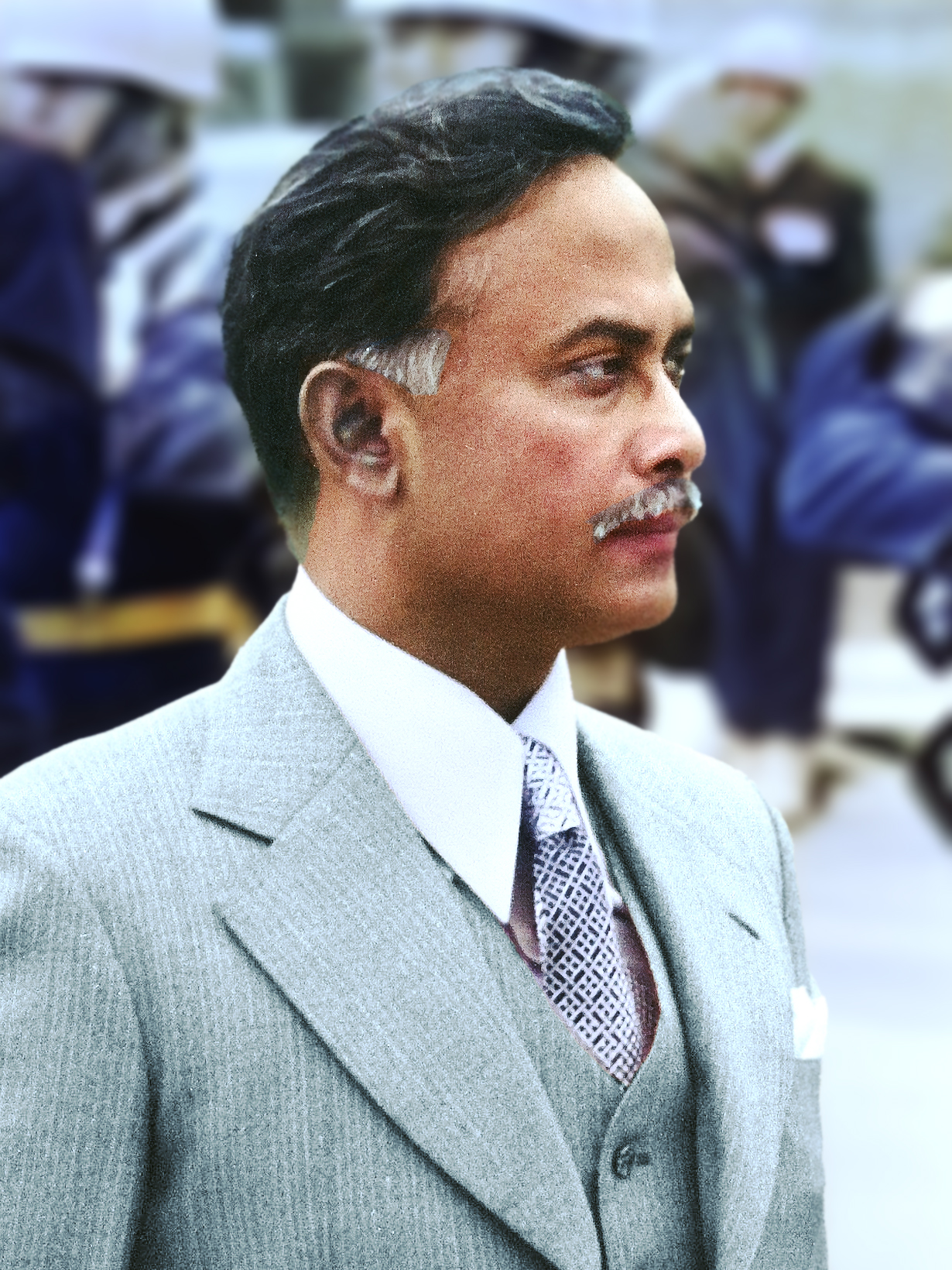
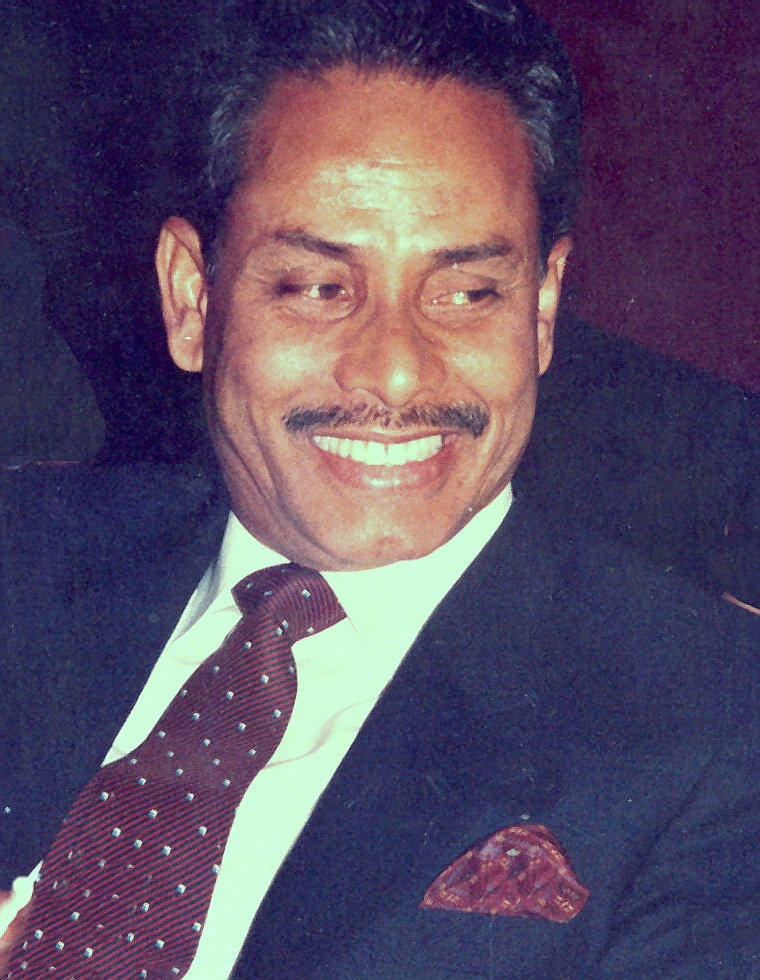
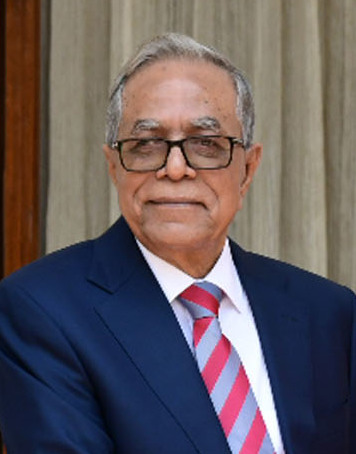
- Top left: Sheikh Mujibur Rahman, the first president of Bangladesh. He was the president from 17 April 1971 to 12 January 1972 and from 25 January 1975 to 15 August 1975.
- Top right: Ziaur Rahman, the first directly elected president of Bangladesh. He was the president from 21 April 1977 to 30 May 1981.
- Bottom left: Hussain Muhammad Ershad, the last directly elected president of Bangladesh. He was the president from 11 December 1983 to 6 December 1990, in an authoritarian regime.
- Bottom right: Mohammad Abdul Hamid, the longest serving president of Bangladesh. He was the president from 14 March 2013 to 24 April 2023.

This article lists the presidents of Bangladesh, and includes persons sworn into the office of president following the Proclamation of Independence and the establishment of the Provisional Government in 1971.

== Numbering ==
After Sheikh Mujibur Rahman, the first president of Bangladesh, there is no single numbering system for the subsequent presidents that is universally accepted and followed, even by government representatives. Different sources may calculate the numbering in different ways, depending whether they count acting presidents, how multiple terms are treated, whether the count is by number of terms or number of individuals, and other factors. For example, A. Q. M. Badruddoza Chowdhury, although he served only a single term, has been described in a government publication and in the press as the 16th President of Bangladesh, as well as the 15th, the 13th and the 11th.

A list published in 2018 by Bdnews24.com appears to coincide with statements made by the country's Election Committee, making Mohammad Abdul Hamid the 20th President when first elected in 2013, yet contradicts the numbering of a list published in 2016 on the President's own official website. The Bangladesh High Commission, Singapore, in 2018 lists him as the 22nd President. Other reports about previous presidents, including some by Bangladesh's newspaper of record the Daily Star, do not correspond with either list.

== List of officeholders ==
Political parties

Awami League (AL)
Bangladesh Krishak Sramik Awami League (BaKSAL)
Jatiyatabadi Front / Bangladesh Nationalist Party (BNP)
Janadal / Jatiya Party (JP(E))

Other affiliations

Military
Independent

Status

Acting president

No.	Portrait	Name (Birth–Death)	Elected	Term of office			Political party (Coalition)
No.	Portrait	Name (Birth–Death)	Elected	Took office	Left office	Time in office	Political party (Coalition)
Provisional Government of Bangladesh (1971–1972)
1		Sheikh Mujibur Rahman শেখ মুজিবুর রহমান (1920–1975) (Note: Incarcerated in Pakistan till 8 January 1972.)	—	17 April 1971	12 January 1972	270 days	AL
—		Syed Nazrul Islam সৈয়দ নজরুল ইসলাম (1925–1975) (Note: Acting in the absence of Sheikh Mujibur Rahman.)	—	17 April 1971	12 January 1972	270 days	AL
People's Republic of Bangladesh (1972–present)
First parliamentary republic (1972–1975)
2		Abu Sayeed Chowdhury আবু সাঈদ চৌধুরী (1921–1987)	—	12 January 1972	24 December 1973	1 year, 346 days	AL
3		Mohammad Mohammadullah মোহাম্মদ মুহম্মদুল্লাহ (1921–1999)	—	24 December 1973	27 January 1974	1 year, 32 days	AL
3		Mohammad Mohammadullah মোহাম্মদ মুহম্মদুল্লাহ (1921–1999)	1974	27 January 1974	25 January 1975	1 year, 32 days	AL
Semi-presidential republic (1975–1991)
(1)		Sheikh Mujibur Rahman শেখ মুজিবুর রহমান (1920–1975)	—	25 January 1975	15 August 1975 (Assassinated in a coup)	202 days	BaKSAL
4		Khondaker Mostaq Ahmad খন্দকার মোশতাক আহমেদ (1918–1996)	—	15 August 1975	6 November 1975 (Deposed in a coup)	83 days	Independent (with military support)
5		Abu Sadat Mohammad Sayem আবু সাদাত মোহাম্মদ সায়েম (1916–1997) (Note: Also Chief Martial Law Administrator (24 August 1975 – 4 November 1975 and 7 November 1975 – 29 November 1976).)	—	6 November 1975	21 April 1977	1 year, 166 days	Independent (with military support)
6		Ziaur Rahman জিয়াউর রহমান (1936–1981) (Note: Also Chief Martial Law Administrator (29 November 1976 – 6 April 1979).)	1977 (Note: Referendum.)	21 April 1977	12 June 1978	4 years, 39 days	Military
6		Ziaur Rahman জিয়াউর রহমান (1936–1981)	1978 (Note: Direct election.)	12 June 1978	30 May 1981 X	4 years, 39 days	Jatiyatabadi Front / BNP
7		Abdus Sattar আব্দুস সাত্তার (1906–1985)	—	30 May 1981	20 November 1981	298 days	BNP
7		Abdus Sattar আব্দুস সাত্তার (1906–1985)	1981	20 November 1981	24 March 1982 (Deposed in a coup)	298 days	BNP
Post vacant (24 – 27 March 1982) (Note: During this period, Chief of Army Staff Lt. Gen. Hussain Muhammad Ershad served as Chief Martial Law Administrator and de facto head of state.)
8		A. F. M. Ahsanuddin Chowdhury আবুল ফজল মোহাম্মদ আহসানউদ্দিন চৌধুরী (1915–2001)	—	27 March 1982	10 December 1983 (Dismissed)	1 year, 258 days	Independent (with military support)
9		Hussain Muhammad Ershad হুসেইন মুহাম্মদ এরশাদ (1930–2019) (Note: Served as Chief Martial Law Administrator until 30 March 1984.)	1985	11 December 1983	15 October 1986	6 years, 360 days	Military
9		Hussain Muhammad Ershad হুসেইন মুহাম্মদ এরশাদ (1930–2019)	1986	15 October 1986	6 December 1990 (Forced to resign)	6 years, 360 days	Janadal / JP(E)
—		Shahabuddin Ahmed শাহাবুদ্দিন আহমেদ (1930–2022)	—	6 December 1990	20 March 1991	104 days	Independent
Second parliamentary republic (1991–present)
(—)		Shahabuddin Ahmed শাহাবুদ্দিন আহমেদ (1930–2022)	—	20 March 1991	10 October 1991	204 days	Independent
10		Abdur Rahman Biswas আবদুর রহমান বিশ্বাস (1926–2017)	1991	10 October 1991	9 October 1996	4 years, 365 days	BNP
11		Shahabuddin Ahmed শাহাবুদ্দিন আহমেদ (1930–2022)	1996	9 October 1996	14 November 2001	5 years, 36 days	Independent
12		A. Q. M. Badruddoza Chowdhury একিউএম বদরুদ্দোজা চৌধুরী (1930–2024) (Note: Also described in various government and press sources as the 16th, 15th, 13th, or 11th president of Bangladesh; no single officeholder numbering has been consistently used by the Bangladeshi government.)	2001	14 November 2001	21 June 2002	219 days	BNP
—		Muhammad Jamiruddin Sircar মুহাম্মদ জমির উদ্দিন সরকার (1931–2026)	—	21 June 2002	6 September 2002	77 days	BNP
13		Iajuddin Ahmed ইয়াজউদ্দিন আহম্মেদ (1931–2012)	2002	6 September 2002	12 February 2009	6 years, 159 days	Independent
14		Zillur Rahman জিল্লুর রহমান (1929–2013)	2009	12 February 2009	20 March 2013 #	4 years, 36 days	AL
15		Mohammad Abdul Hamid মোহাম্মদ আব্দুল হামিদ (born 1944) (Note: Acting for Zillur Rahman until 20 March 2013.)	—	14 March 2013	24 April 2013	10 years, 41 days	AL
15		Mohammad Abdul Hamid মোহাম্মদ আব্দুল হামিদ (born 1944)	2013	24 April 2013	24 April 2018	10 years, 41 days	AL
15		Mohammad Abdul Hamid মোহাম্মদ আব্দুল হামিদ (born 1944)	2018	24 April 2018	24 April 2023	10 years, 41 days	AL
16		Mohammed Shahabuddin মোহাম্মদ সাহাবুদ্দিন (born 1949) (Note: Elected as the nominee of the Awami League; the party was banned in 2025 following the 2024 uprising. Shahabuddin's official biography and his 2026 resignation letter describe him as the 22nd president of Bangladesh — a different, non-consecutive numbering tradition used in some government and press sources (compare the note on A. Q. M. Badruddoza Chowdhury above). This list uses consecutive numbering of distinct presidencies.)	2023	24 April 2023	24 July 2026 (Resigned)	3 years, 91 days	AL
16		Mohammed Shahabuddin মোহাম্মদ সাহাবুদ্দিন (born 1949)	2023	24 April 2023	24 July 2026 (Resigned)	3 years, 91 days	Independent
—		Hafiz Uddin Ahmad হাফিজ উদ্দিন আহমদ (born 1944) (Note: Acting president as Speaker of the Jatiya Sangsad, per Article 54 of the Constitution, pending election of a new president within 90 days under Article 123(1).)	—	24 July 2026	21 August 2026	28 days	BNP
17		Mirza Fakhrul Islam Alamgir মির্জা ফখরুল ইসলাম আলমগীর (born 1948)	2026	21 August 2026	Incumbent	85 days	BNP

== See also ==
- Presidential elections in Bangladesh
- List of office-holders in the Government of Bangladesh
- Caretaker government of Bangladesh
- Chief Adviser
- Prime Minister of Bangladesh
  - List of prime ministers of Bangladesh
- President of Bangladesh
- Vice President of Bangladesh
- List of rulers of Bengal
