= Presidential elections in Bangladesh =

Since the independence of Bangladesh, the presidential election process has been changed several times due to both the presidential and parliamentary arrangements. According to the Second Schedule to the Constitution of 1972, the president of the parliament used to be elected by a secret vote. Later, according to the fourth amendment to the constitution, the provision of the direct election system of presidential election was introduced. But soon after 12th Amendment to the Constitution, the provision of presidential elections through an indirect election was introduced after the parliamentary system was installed. At present, the president is elected by an indirect election by the members of parliament as per Article 48 of the Constitution.

== Procedure ==
=== Eligibility requirements ===
The constitution of Bangladesh determines the eligibility of a person becoming a president. To be president, these criteria must be met. According to Article 48 of the Constitution of Bangladesh, a person shall not be qualified for election as president if they:

- are less than thirty-five years of age; or
- have not qualified for election as a member of Parliament; or
- have been removed from the office of President by impeachment under this Constitution.

=== Term duration ===
According to the article 50 of Constitution of Bangladesh:

- The President shall hold office for a term of five years from the date on which they enter office. Provided that notwithstanding the expiration of their term the President shall continue to hold office until their successor enters office.
- No person shall hold office as president for more than two terms, whether or not the terms are consecutive.
- The President may resign by writing a letter addressed to the Speaker.
- The President during their term of office shall not be qualified for election as a member of Parliament, and if a member of Parliament is elected as president they shall vacate their seat in Parliament on the day on which they enters office as president.

=== Election process ===
Whenever the presidential office becomes vacant, the new president is elected by the members of parliament. Although the presidential election involves actual voting from the MPs, they tend to unanimously vote for their respective party-backed candidates. The president may get impeached with a process involving vote from more than two-thirds of the parliament with valid charges being brought.

=== Oath and affirmation ===
The president has to take an oath in the presence of the speaker of the Jatiya Sangsad. An oath (or affirmation) in the following form shall be administered by the speaker as follows:

I, (name), do solemnly swear (or affirm) that I will faithfully discharge the duties of the office of President of Bangladesh according to law;

That I will bear true faith and allegiance to Bangladesh;

That I will preserve, protect and defend the Constitution;

And that I will do right to all manner of people according to law, without fear or favour, affection or ill-will.

— Article 148, Constitution of Bangladesh

== History ==
Since the independence of Bangladesh, eleven presidential elections have been held, of which three were direct elections. After independence in 1974, Speaker of the Assembly Mohammad Mohammadullah became the first president of Bangladesh without any contestation through an election. He was elected through the first presidential election before presidential government system was introduced. The election was held on 24 January 1974. The constituent parliament members elected him unanimously.

The next presidential election, the first direct or public presidential election was held on 3 June 1978, with the participation of general voters. Eleven candidates submitted their nomination papers to run for the election. Two nomination papers were disapproved initially. However, the contestant number rose to 10 as the appeal of one of the two disqualified contestants was accepted. Major General Ziaur Rahman was elected as president in that election.

The direct presidential election for the second time was held on 15 November 1981 in the same manner. Eighty-three candidates for the election submitted nomination papers. Eleven nomination papers were disapproved. The number of valid candidates became 72. Later, 33 of the 72 candidates withdrew their candidacy making the number of contestants 39. Justice Abdus Sattar was elected as president in that election.

The third direct presidential election was held on 15 October 1986. In this election, 16 candidates submitted nomination papers; however, following the withdrawal of candidacy of four candidates, the total number of contestants became 12. Notably the election was boycotted by the major opposition parties, who demanded the lifting of martial law. Incumbent Lt. Gen. Hussain Muhammad Ershad, who had assumed office three years early following a military coup which he led, was elected as the president in that election, despite reports of irregularities.

In 1991, parliamentary government system was restored in Bangladesh. Since the restoration of the parliamentary system, the president is elected by the parliament members. After 1991, persons who have been elected to the post of president include Abdur Rahman Biswas, Justice Shahabuddin Ahmad, Professor Dr. AQM Babdruddoza Chowdhury, Professor Dr. Iajuddin Ahmed, Zillur Rahman and Abdul Hamid. All of them have been elected uncontestedly.

== List of presidential elections ==
| Election order | Year | Elected | Government system | Election type |
|---|---|---|---|---|
| 1st | 1974 | Mohammad Mohammadullah | Parliamentary system | Indirect election, through secret ballot |
| 2nd | 1978 | Ziaur Rahman | Semi-presidential system | Direct election, through public voting |
| 3rd | 1981 | Abdus Sattar | Semi-presidential system | Direct election, through public voting |
| 4th | 1986 | Hussain Muhammad Ershad | Military-backed presidential system | Direct election, through public voting |
| 5th | 1991 | Abdur Rahman Biswas | Parliamentary system | Indirect election, through voting by MPs |
| 6th | 1996 | Shahabuddin Ahmed | Parliamentary system | Indirect election, through voting by MPs |
| 7th | 2001 | A. Q. M. Badruddoza Chowdhury | Parliamentary system | Indirect election, through voting by MPs |
| 8th | 2002 | Iajuddin Ahmed | Parliamentary system | Indirect election, through voting by MPs |
| 9th | 2009 | Zillur Rahman | Parliamentary system | Indirect election, through voting by MPs |
| 10th | 2013 | Mohammad Abdul Hamid | Parliamentary system | Indirect election, through voting by MPs |
| 11th | 2018 | Mohammad Abdul Hamid | Parliamentary system | Indirect election, through voting by MPs |
| 12th | 2023 | Mohammed Shahabuddin | Parliamentary system | Indirect election, through voting by MPs |
| 13th | 2026 | Mirza Fakhrul Islam Alamgir | Parliamentary system | Indirect election, through voting by MPs |
