= 1979 Bangladeshi general election =

- 18 February 1979

300 of the 330 seats in the Jatiya Sangsad 151 seats needed for a majority
- Registered: 38,363,858
- Turnout: 51.29% (▼3.62pp)
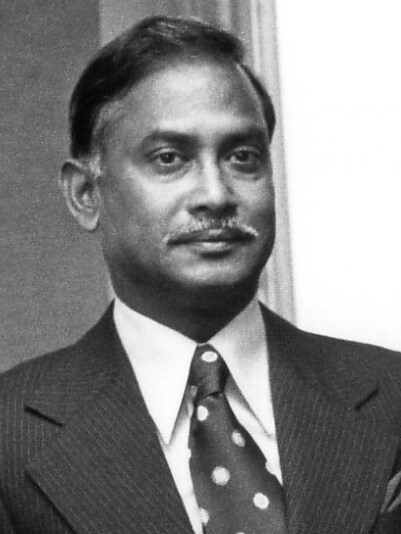

	First party	Second party
Leader	Ziaur Rahman	Asaduzzaman Khan
Party	BNP	AL
Last election	–	293 seats
Seats won	207	39
Seat change	New	▼256
Popular vote	7,934,236	4,734,277
Percentage	41.17%	24.56%
Senior Minister (acting Prime Minister) before election
Mashiur Rahman
BNP
Subsequent Prime Minister
Shah Azizur Rahman
BNP

General elections were held in Bangladesh on 18 February 1979. The result was a victory for the Bangladesh Nationalist Party (BNP), the party of the incumbent military regime, which won 207 of the 300 directly elected seats, although it only won 41% of the vote. Voter turnout was 51%. The Awami League became the main opposition party after winning 39 seats.

The elections were organized by the military regime in Bangladesh. The elections were postponed twice, as they were initially supposed to be held in December 1978. The political opposition in Bangladesh intended to boycott the elections unless the military regime withdrew martial law, assured that there would be a parliamentary system, released political prisoners, and restored full press freedom. Ziaur Rahman made some concessions to the opposition, but they fell short of their full demands. Subsequently, some opposition parties decided to take part in the elections.

== Results ==
Party	Votes	%	Seats			
Party	Votes	%	General	Women	Total	+/–
Bangladesh Nationalist Party	7,934,236	41.17	207	30	237	New
Awami League	4,734,277	24.56	39	0	39	–269
Bangladesh Muslim League–Islamic Democratic League	1,941,394	10.07	20	0	20	New
Jatiya Samajtantrik Dal	931,851	4.83	8	0	8	+7
Awami League (Mizan)	535,426	2.78	2	0	2	New
National Awami Party (Muzaffar)	432,514	2.24	1	0	1	New
United Peoples' Party	170,955	0.89	0	0	0	New
Bangladesh Gono Front	115,622	0.60	2	0	2	New
National Awami Party (Nurur-Zahid)	88,385	0.46	0	0	0	New
Communist Party of Bangladesh	75,455	0.39	0	0	0	0
Communist Party of Bangladesh (Marxist–Leninist)	74,771	0.39	1	0	1	New
Bangladesh Jatiya League	69,319	0.36	2	0	2	+1
Jatiya Ekata Party	44,459	0.23	1	0	1	New
Bangladesh Ganatantrik Andolan	34,259	0.18	1	0	1	New
Jatiyatabadi Ganatantrik Dal	27,259	0.14	0	0	0	New
National Awami Party (Naser)	25,336	0.13	0	0	0	New
Bangladesh Janata Dal	18,748	0.10	0	0	0	New
National Republican Party for Parity	14,429	0.07	0	0	0	New
Jatiya Janata Party	10,932	0.06	0	0	0	New
Bangladesh Labour Party	7,738	0.04	0	0	0	New
People's Democratic Party	5,703	0.03	0	0	0	New
Sramik Krishak Samajbadi Dal	4,954	0.03	0	0	0	New
Bangladesh Democratic Party	3,564	0.02	0	0	0	New
Bangladesh Jatiya Mukti Party	3,363	0.02	0	0	0	New
Bangladesh Tanti Samity	1,834	0.01	0	0	0	New
Bangladesh Nizam-e-Islam Party	1,575	0.01	0	0	0	New
Gano Azadi League	1,378	0.01	0	0	0	New
United Republican Party	389	0.00	0	0	0	New
Bangladesh Ganatantrik Chashi Dal	130	0.00	0	0	0	New
Independents	1,963,345	10.19	16	0	16	+15
Total	19,273,600	100.00	300	30	330	+15
Valid votes	19,273,600	97.95				
Invalid/blank votes	402,524	2.05				
Total votes	19,676,124	100.00				
Registered voters/turnout	38,363,858	51.29				
Source: Nohlen et al., IPU, Government of Bangladesh
