= June 1996 Bangladeshi general election =

- 12 June 1996

300 of the 330 seats in the Jatiya Sangsad 151 seats needed for a majority
- Registered: 56,716,935
- Turnout: 75.60% (▲54.63pp)
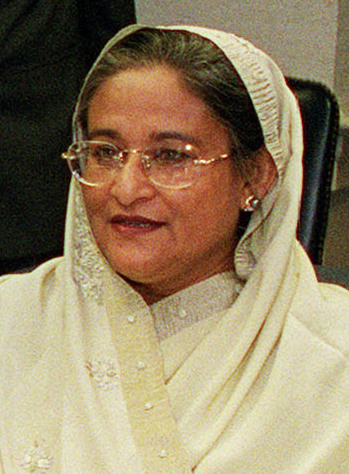

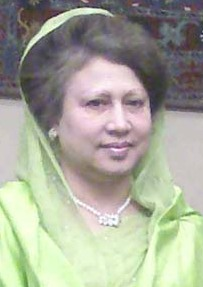

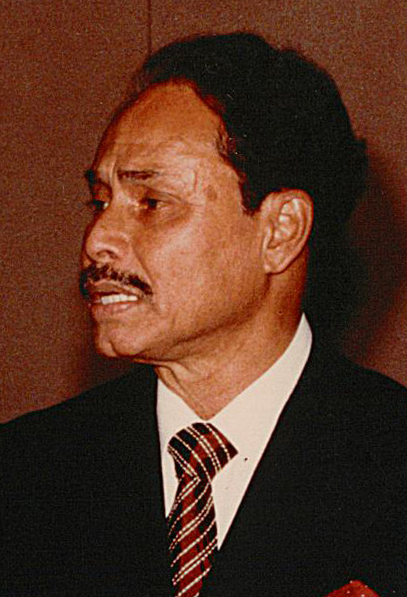
| | First party | Second party | Third party |
|---|---|---|---|
| Leader | Sheikh Hasina | Khaleda Zia | H.M. Ershad |
| Party | AL | BNP | JP(E) |
| Last election | Boycotted | 278 seats | Boycotted |
| Seats won | 146 | 116 | 32 |
| Seat change | ▲146 | ▼162 | ▲32 |
| Popular vote | 15,882,792 | 14,255,986 | 6,954,981 |
| Percentage | 37.44% | 33.63% | 16.40% |
- Results by constituency
Chief Adviser before election
Muhammad Habibur Rahman
Independent (caretaker)
Prime Minister after election
Sheikh Hasina
AL

Snap general elections were held in Bangladesh on 12 June 1996. They were called following the controversial February 1996 elections, which were boycotted by the opposition and saw a turnout of just 21%.

The result of the snap elections was a victory for the Bangladesh Awami League, which won 146 of the 300 directly elected seats, resulting in its leader Sheikh Hasina becoming Prime Minister. It was the first election victory for the Awami League since 1973 and the party's removal from power in a 1975 coup. Voter turnout was 76%, the highest in Bangladesh's electoral history until 2008.

== Background ==
The June 1996 elections were the second general elections to be held within a four-month period. Previously in February, a general election had been held which was boycotted by an alliance of all major opposition parties (Awami League, Jamaat-e-Islam, Jatiya Party). The opposition were demanding the installation of a neutral caretaker government to oversee the election, citing a 1994 by-election (which they alleged to have been rigged) as evidence of the BNP's inability to hold a free and fair election. Despite the boycott the February election went ahead and the incumbent Prime Minister Khaleda Zia's BNP was re-elected for the second term in a landslide victory, with the majority of seats uncontested. The voting was denounced as unfair by the three main opposition parties and the voter turnout was the lowest in Bangladesh's parliamentary electoral history at only 21%.

Following the elections President Abdur Rahman Biswas invited Zia to form a government, but this administration was short-lived, lasting only 12 days. A series of hartals (strikes) were called by the other parties and an indefinite non-cooperation movement was called until demands for a new, free election was met. On 25 March 1996, following escalating political turmoil, the sitting Parliament enacted the thirteenth constitutional amendment to allow a neutral caretaker government to assume power and conduct new parliamentary elections. On 30 March, Prime Minister Khaleda Zia resigned, and the Parliament was dissolved. That same day, President appointed former Chief Justice Muhammad Habibur Rahman as Chief Advisor (a position equivalent to prime minister) in the interim government. A new election was scheduled for 12 June 1996.

== Electoral system ==
In 1996 the 330 members of the Jatiya Sangsad consisted of 300 directly elected seats using first-past-the-post voting in single-member constituencies, and an additional 30 seats reserved for women. The reserved seats are distributed based on the election results. Each parliament sits for a five-year term.

== Campaign ==
During the election campaign there was an attempted coup d'état by the military. On 12 May President Abdur Rahman Biswas fired Lieutenant General Abu Saleh Mohammad Nasim, Chief of the Staff of the Army, due to his refusal to carry out a presidential order to retire two of his generals who were alleged to be consorting with political parties in violation of military rules. Nasim revolted against the president and organised troops loyal to him. Consequently, Biswas dismissed Nasim and appointed a new chief of staff. Troops loyal to the President were mobilised to protect government institutions in the capital and Nasim was arrested by military police and the attempted coup d'état failed.

A total of 2,574 candidates contested the elections. The Awami League, Bangladesh Nationalist Party and Jamaat-e-Islami Bangladesh all put forward full slates of 300 candidates. The Jatiya Party ran 293 candidates, Islami Oikkya Jote 166 and Jatiya Samajtantrik Dal (Rab) 67, with other minor parties nominating a combined 864 candidates. 284 candidates ran as independents.

== Results ==
The elections were won by the Bangladesh Awami League, who were just shy of a majority, winning 146 of the 300 directly elected seats. The election was close in terms of popular vote share between Awami League and BNP, with a difference of less than 4%. However, as a result of first-past-the-post voting, the Awami League secured a 30-seat lead over the BNP. The elections saw a high voter turnout of 76%.

With the support of Jatiya Party, the leader of Awami League, Sheikh Hasina, was invited to form a government on 23 June, beginning her first term as Prime Minister. The first sitting of the seventh parliament of Bangladesh was subsequently held on 14 July 1996.

Of the 300 directly elected seats, only eight were won by female candidates. An additional 30 seats were reserved in the Jatiya Sangsad for women, of which 27 were awarded to Awami League and rest to Jatiya Party.

| Party | Votes | % | Seats | | | |
| Party | Votes | % | General | Women | Total | +/– |
|---|---|---|---|---|---|---|
| Awami League | 15,882,792 | 37.44 | 146 | 27 | 173 | New |
| Bangladesh Nationalist Party | 14,255,986 | 33.61 | 116 | 0 | 116 | –192 |
| Jatiya Party | 6,954,981 | 16.40 | 32 | 3 | 35 | New |
| Bangladesh Jamaat-e-Islami | 3,653,013 | 8.61 | 3 | 0 | 3 | New |
| Islami Oikya Jote | 461,517 | 1.09 | 1 | 0 | 1 | New |
| Zaker Party | 167,597 | 0.40 | 0 | 0 | 0 | New |
| Jatiya Samajtantrik Dal (Rab) | 97,916 | 0.23 | 1 | 0 | 1 | New |
| Workers Party of Bangladesh | 56,404 | 0.13 | 0 | 0 | 0 | New |
| Gano Forum | 54,250 | 0.13 | 0 | 0 | 0 | New |
| Jatiya Samajtantrik Dal (Inu) | 50,944 | 0.12 | 0 | 0 | 0 | New |
| Communist Party of Bangladesh | 48,549 | 0.11 | 0 | 0 | 0 | New |
| Jamiat Ulema-e-Islam Bangladesh | 45,585 | 0.11 | 0 | 0 | 0 | New |
| Sammilita Sangram Parishad | 40,803 | 0.10 | 0 | 0 | 0 | New |
| Bangladesh Freedom Party | 38,974 | 0.09 | 0 | 0 | 0 | –1 |
| Samridhya Bangladesh Andolon | 27,083 | 0.06 | 0 | 0 | 0 | New |
| Bangladesh Islami Front | 23,696 | 0.06 | 0 | 0 | 0 | New |
| Bangladesh Khilafat Andolan | 18,397 | 0.04 | 0 | 0 | 0 | New |
| Bangladesh Jatiyabadi Awami League | 11,190 | 0.03 | 0 | 0 | 0 | New |
| Islami Shasontontro Andolon | 11,159 | 0.03 | 0 | 0 | 0 | New |
| Bangladesher Samajtantrik Dal (Khalekuzzaman) | 10,234 | 0.02 | 0 | 0 | 0 | New |
| Bangladesh Samajtantrik Dal (Mahbub) | 6,791 | 0.02 | 0 | 0 | 0 | New |
| Bangladesh National Awami Party (NAP Bashani) | 5,948 | 0.01 | 0 | 0 | 0 | New |
| Bangladesh Muslim League (Jamir Ali) | 4,580 | 0.01 | 0 | 0 | 0 | New |
| Ganatantri Party | 4,114 | 0.01 | 0 | 0 | 0 | New |
| Bangladesh National Awami Party (NAP) | 3,620 | 0.01 | 0 | 0 | 0 | New |
| Democratic Republican Party | 3,605 | 0.01 | 0 | 0 | 0 | New |
| Bangladesh Janata Party | 3,364 | 0.01 | 0 | 0 | 0 | New |
| Jatiya Janata Party (Nurul Islam) | 2,986 | 0.01 | 0 | 0 | 0 | New |
| Jatiya Janata Party (Sheikh Asad) | 2,395 | 0.01 | 0 | 0 | 0 | New |
| Social Democratic Party | 1,938 | 0.00 | 0 | 0 | 0 | New |
| Bangladesh Gano Azadi League | 1,683 | 0.00 | 0 | 0 | 0 | New |
| Progotisil Jatiata Badi Dal | 1,515 | 0.00 | 0 | 0 | 0 | New |
| Hak Kathar Mancha | 1,340 | 0.00 | 0 | 0 | 0 | New |
| Bangladesh Samyabadi Dal (Marxist-Leninist) | 1,148 | 0.00 | 0 | 0 | 0 | New |
| Sramik Krishak Samajbadi Dal | 964 | 0.00 | 0 | 0 | 0 | New |
| Communist Kendra | 888 | 0.00 | 0 | 0 | 0 | New |
| Jatiya Biplobi Front | 631 | 0.00 | 0 | 0 | 0 | New |
| Saat Dalya Jote (Mirpur) | 602 | 0.00 | 0 | 0 | 0 | New |
| Bangladesh Hindu League | 570 | 0.00 | 0 | 0 | 0 | New |
| Bangladesh Peoples Party | 558 | 0.00 | 0 | 0 | 0 | New |
| Bangladesh Bekar Samaj | 548 | 0.00 | 0 | 0 | 0 | New |
| Bangladesh Tafsil Jati Federation (S.K. Mandal) | 537 | 0.00 | 0 | 0 | 0 | New |
| Desh Prem Party | 532 | 0.00 | 0 | 0 | 0 | New |
| Ganotantrik Sarbahara Party | 502 | 0.00 | 0 | 0 | 0 | New |
| Bangladesh Jatiya League (Sobhan) | 418 | 0.00 | 0 | 0 | 0 | New |
| Jana Dal | 395 | 0.00 | 0 | 0 | 0 | New |
| Jatiya Samajtantrik Dal (Mahiuddin) | 393 | 0.00 | 0 | 0 | 0 | New |
| Jatiya Seba Dal | 365 | 0.00 | 0 | 0 | 0 | New |
| National Democratic Party | 353 | 0.00 | 0 | 0 | 0 | New |
| Bangladesh Krisak Sramik Janata Party | 294 | 0.00 | 0 | 0 | 0 | New |
| Islami Al Zihad Dal | 288 | 0.00 | 0 | 0 | 0 | New |
| Bangladesh Sarbahara Party | 248 | 0.00 | 0 | 0 | 0 | New |
| Jatiya Daridra Party | 244 | 0.00 | 0 | 0 | 0 | New |
| Sramajibi Oikya Forum | 229 | 0.00 | 0 | 0 | 0 | New |
| Islamic Dal Bangladesh (Saifur) | 221 | 0.00 | 0 | 0 | 0 | New |
| Bangladesh People's League | 213 | 0.00 | 0 | 0 | 0 | New |
| Bangladesh Samajtantrik Samsad (Darshan Shava) | 209 | 0.00 | 0 | 0 | 0 | New |
| Bangladesh Krishak Sramik Mukti Andolon | 189 | 0.00 | 0 | 0 | 0 | New |
| Gano Oikkya Front (Guff) | 186 | 0.00 | 0 | 0 | 0 | New |
| Bangladesh Mehanati Front | 173 | 0.00 | 0 | 0 | 0 | New |
| Bangladesh Tafsili Federation (Sudir) | 150 | 0.00 | 0 | 0 | 0 | New |
| People's Muslim League | 140 | 0.00 | 0 | 0 | 0 | New |
| National Awami Party (NAP Bhashani) | 138 | 0.00 | 0 | 0 | 0 | New |
| Quran Dorshion Sangshta Bangladesh | 137 | 0.00 | 0 | 0 | 0 | New |
| Progatishil Gonotantrik Shakti | 134 | 0.00 | 0 | 0 | 0 | New |
| Bangladesh Islami Party | 132 | 0.00 | 0 | 0 | 0 | New |
| Bangladesh Jatiya Agragati Party | 131 | 0.00 | 0 | 0 | 0 | New |
| Oikya Prokria | 112 | 0.00 | 0 | 0 | 0 | New |
| Bangladesh Bashani Adarsha Bastabayan Parishad | 107 | 0.00 | 0 | 0 | 0 | New |
| Bangladesh Bastuhara Parishad | 105 | 0.00 | 0 | 0 | 0 | New |
| Bangladesh National Congress | 99 | 0.00 | 0 | 0 | 0 | New |
| Quran Sunna Bastabayan Party | 82 | 0.00 | 0 | 0 | 0 | New |
| Bangladesh Tanjimul Muslimin | 81 | 0.00 | 0 | 0 | 0 | New |
| Samridhya Bangladesh Babosai Samproday | 48 | 0.00 | 0 | 0 | 0 | New |
| Bashani Front | 45 | 0.00 | 0 | 0 | 0 | New |
| Bangladesh Krishak Raj Islami Party | 33 | 0.00 | 0 | 0 | 0 | New |
| National Patriotic Party | 31 | 0.00 | 0 | 0 | 0 | New |
| Bangladesh Islami Biplobi Parishad | 29 | 0.00 | 0 | 0 | 0 | New |
| Taherikay Olama-e-Bangladesh | 29 | 0.00 | 0 | 0 | 0 | New |
| United Peoples' Party | 26 | 0.00 | 0 | 0 | 0 | New |
| Bangladesh Manabodjikar Dal | 20 | 0.00 | 0 | 0 | 0 | New |
| Independents | 449,618 | 1.06 | 1 | 0 | 1 | –9 |
| Total | 42,418,274 | 100.00 | 300 | 30 | 330 | 0 |
| Valid votes | 42,418,274 | 98.92 | | | | |
| Invalid/blank votes | 462,302 | 1.08 | | | | |
| Total votes | 42,880,576 | 100.00 | | | | |
| Registered voters/turnout | 56,716,935 | 75.60 | | | | |
Source: ECB, Kumar Panday

== Aftermath ==
After the election the BNP rejected the results, alleging large-scale rigging. Party secretary Abdus Salam Talukder demanded re-elections in 111 constituencies. Senior BNP leader A. Q. M. Badruddoza Chowdhury described the polls as "unprecedentedly rigged" and "pre-planned and conspiratorial." Party chair Khaleda Zia later stated that the BNP neither accepted nor boycotted the results but claimed that various obstacles had prevented the people's mandate from being reflected. However, international election observer groups—including the National Democratic Institute of the United States, the European Union, South Asian Association for Regional Cooperation observers and a Japanese delegation—stated that the elections were free, fair and transparent, with no substantial evidence of rigging presented. Chief Election Commissioner Mohammad Abu Hena reported a 73% voter turnout and asserted that the election process had no scope for manipulation. Awami League leader Sheikh Hasina was sworn in as Prime Minister on 23 June 1996 with the support of the Jatiya Party. Though initially hesitant, the BNP eventually decided to join the Parliament.

Hasina's administration completed its full five-year term, the first parliamentary administration to ever do so, and the next elections were held in October 2001.
