= 1991 Bangladeshi general election =

- 27 February 1991

300 of the 330 seats in the Jatiya Sangsad 151 seats needed for a majority
- Registered: 62,181,743
- Turnout: 55.45% (▲2.97pp)
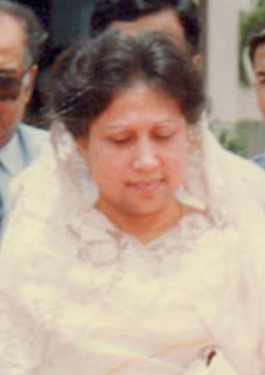

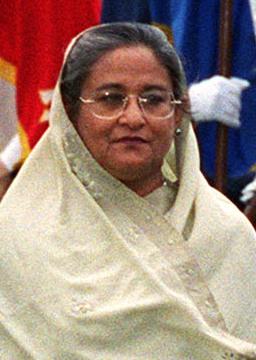

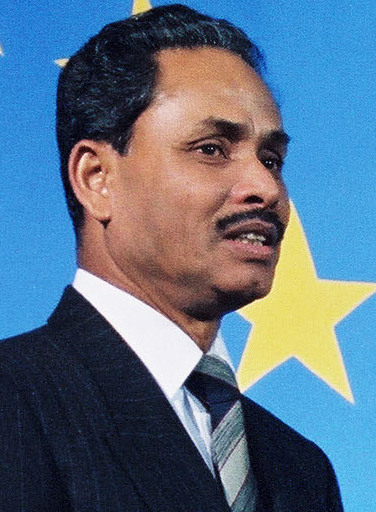

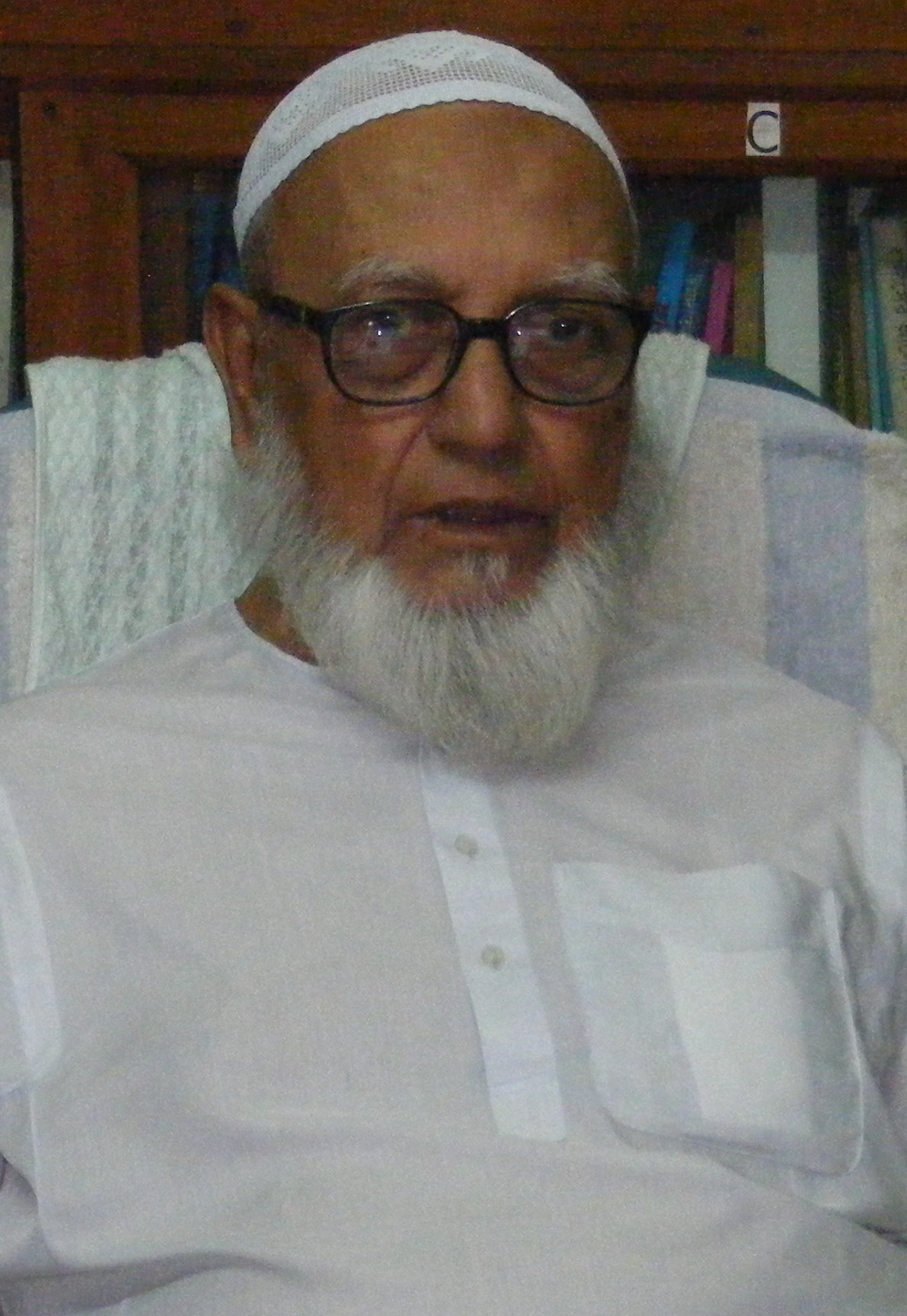
| | First party | Second party |
|---|---|---|
| Leader | Khaleda Zia | Sheikh Hasina |
| Party | BNP | AL |
| Alliance | 7 Party |
| Last election | Boycotted | Boycotted |
| Seats won | 140 | 88 |
| Seat change | New | New |
| Popular vote | 10,507,549 | 10,259,866 |
| Percentage | 30.81% | 30.08% |
| | Third party | Fourth party |
| Leader | H.M. Ershad | Ghulam Azam |
| Party | JP(E) | Jamaat |
| Last election | 251 seats | Boycotted |
| Seats won | 35 | 18 |
| Seat change | ▼216 | New |
| Popular vote | 4,063,537 | 4,136,661 |
| Percentage | 11.92% | 12.13% |
- Results by constituency
Prime Minister before election
Post vacant
(acting president Shahabuddin Ahmed led a caretaker government)
Prime Minister after election
Khaleda Zia
BNP

General elections were held in Bangladesh on 27 February 1991. The Bangladesh Nationalist Party (BNP) emerged as the largest party in parliament, winning 140 of the 300 directly elected seats. The BNP formed a government with the support of Jamaat-e-Islami Bangladesh, and on 20 March, Khaleda Zia was sworn in for her first term as prime minister.

The elections were described to be free and fair by many international observers, and it played a major role in solidifying Bangladeshi democracy in the aftermath of the anti-government protests in the late 1980s. Voter turnout was 55.4%.

The election was disproportionate, with the BNP winning 52 more seats than the Awami League (AL), despite their popular vote total differing by less than one percentage point.

== Background ==
In 1990, a mass uprising led by future prime ministers Khaleda Zia and Sheikh Hasina deposed the president, former army chief Hussain Muhammad Ershad, from power in December. Ershad had assumed the presidency in 1983 following a coup d'état in 1982.

The previous general elections had been held in 1988 and saw Ershad's Jatiya Party win 251 of the 300 seats. However, the elections had been boycotted by all major opposition parties and were described by one Western diplomat as "a mockery of an election". On 6 December 1990, the day of Ershad's resignation, parliament was dissolved and new elections were scheduled for 2 March 1991, but subsequently advanced to 27 February, with all major political parties participating.

== Electoral system ==
The 330 members of the Jatiya Sangsad consisted of 300 directly elected seats using first-past-the-post voting in single-member constituencies, and an additional 30 seats reserved for women. The reserved seats were elected by the directly elected members. Each parliament sits for a five-year term.

== Campaign ==
During the announcement of the party manifesto ahead of the general election, Sheikh Hasina expressed optimism about the AL securing a two-thirds majority in Parliament. The party pledged to restore the 1972 Constitution and re-establish the parliamentary system if elected. On the campaign trail in Bogra, Hasina emphasized the party's focus on realistic commitments, promising solutions to regional issues such as the construction of the Jamuna Bridge. Her confidence in electoral victory was evident in various speeches, including a rally in Khulna where she was quoted by The Daily Ittefaq saying that both at home and abroad, people believed the AL would return to power. In contrast, BNP leader Khaleda Zia combined promises of development with warnings against voting for the AL. At a rally on Dhaka's Manik Mia Avenue, she stated, "We hold the flag of independence, others hold the chains of servitude," urging voters to choose the BNP's symbol, the sheaf of paddy, to protect national sovereignty.

Throughout the campaign, religious emblems, symbols, and rhetoric were deliberately utilized by parties like the AL, BNP, and Jamaat to gain popular support. The BNP openly declared that the passage Bismi Allāh-al-Rahmān-al-Rahīm would be removed from the Constitution if AL secured victory. Hasina denied these allegations, stating that she did not have any opposing views on it. Religiously motivated slogans were also well observed. The BNP campaign used the slogan Lā ʿIlāha illa Allāh, dhaner shishe Bismi Allāh ("vote for the symbol of the paddy sheaf, assuming that God is merciful"). Countering it, the AL campaign used the slogan Lā ʾIlāha illa Allāh, nawkar mālik tui Allāh ("there is no God but Allah; the boat belongs to Allah"). On the other hand, the Jamaat campaign used the slogan Vote dile pallay, khushi hobe Allāh ("if you vote for scale, it would bring Allāh's pleasure").

== Results ==
The elections saw the BNP win 140 of the 300 directly elected seats, 11 short of a parliamentary majority. The BNP's primary rivals, the AL, led by Sheikh Hasina, won only 88 seats. However, there was little difference between the two main parties in terms of the popular vote share, with BNP only receiving around 250,000 votes more than the AL.

Of the directly elected 300 seats, only four were won by female candidates. Following the elections, the BNP won 28 of the 30 reserved seats for women.

| Party | Votes | % | Seats | | | |
| Party | Votes | % | General | Women | Total | +/– |
|---|---|---|---|---|---|---|
| Bangladesh Nationalist Party | 10,507,549 | 30.81 | 140 | 28 | 168 | New |
| Awami League | 10,259,866 | 30.08 | 88 | 0 | 88 | New |
| Bangladesh Jamaat-e-Islami | 4,136,661 | 12.13 | 18 | 2 | 20 | New |
| Jatiya Party | 4,063,537 | 11.92 | 35 | 0 | 35 | –216 |
| Bangladesh Krishak Sramik Awami League | 616,014 | 1.81 | 5 | 0 | 5 | New |
| Zaker Party | 417,737 | 1.22 | 0 | 0 | 0 | New |
| Communist Party of Bangladesh | 407,515 | 1.19 | 5 | 0 | 5 | New |
| Jatiya Samajtantrik Dal (Rab) | 269,451 | 0.79 | 0 | 0 | 0 | New |
| Islami Oikya Jote | 269,434 | 0.79 | 1 | 0 | 1 | New |
| National Awami Party (Muzaffar) | 259,978 | 0.76 | 1 | 0 | 1 | New |
| Jatiya Samajtantrik Dal (Inu) | 171,011 | 0.50 | 0 | 0 | 0 | New |
| Ganatantri Party | 152,592 | 0.45 | 1 | 0 | 1 | New |
| National Democratic Party | 121,918 | 0.36 | 1 | 0 | 1 | New |
| Bangladesh Janata Dal | 120,729 | 0.35 | 0 | 0 | 0 | New |
| United Communist League of Bangladesh | 110,517 | 0.32 | 0 | 0 | 0 | New |
| Bangladesh Khilafat Andolan | 93,049 | 0.27 | 0 | 0 | 0 | 0 |
| Freedom Party | 90,781 | 0.27 | 0 | 0 | 0 | –2 |
| Jatiya Samajtantrik Dal (Siraj) | 84,276 | 0.25 | 1 | 0 | 1 | –2 |
| Bangladesh Muslim League (Ainuddin) | 66,575 | 0.20 | 0 | 0 | 0 | New |
| Workers Party of Bangladesh | 63,434 | 0.19 | 1 | 0 | 1 | New |
| Bangladesh Samajtantrik Dal (Khaliquzzaman) | 34,868 | 0.10 | 0 | 0 | 0 | New |
| Bangladesh Muslim League (Kader) | 32,693 | 0.10 | 0 | 0 | 0 | New |
| Janata Mukti Party | 30,962 | 0.09 | 0 | 0 | 0 | New |
| Jatiya Ganotantrik Party | 24,761 | 0.07 | 0 | 0 | 0 | New |
| Bangladesh Islami Front | 24,310 | 0.07 | 0 | 0 | 0 | New |
| Jatiya Oikkya Front | 21,624 | 0.06 | 0 | 0 | 0 | New |
| Jatiya Janata Party–Ganatantrik Oikkya Jote | 20,568 | 0.06 | 0 | 0 | 0 | New |
| Jamaaiatay Olamaya Islam Front | 15,073 | 0.04 | 0 | 0 | 0 | New |
| Bangladesh Samajtantrik Dal (Mahbub) | 13,413 | 0.04 | 0 | 0 | 0 | New |
| Bangladesh Hindu League | 11,941 | 0.04 | 0 | 0 | 0 | New |
| Bangladesh Samyabadi Dal (Marxist-Leninist) | 11,275 | 0.03 | 0 | 0 | 0 | New |
| Oikkya Prakriyya | 11,074 | 0.03 | 0 | 0 | 0 | New |
| Bangladesh Muslim League (Matin) | 11,073 | 0.03 | 0 | 0 | 0 | New |
| National Awami Party (Bhashani) | 9,129 | 0.03 | 0 | 0 | 0 | New |
| Pragotishil Jatiyatabadi Dal | 6,677 | 0.02 | 0 | 0 | 0 | New |
| Sramik Krishak Samajbadi Dal | 6,396 | 0.02 | 0 | 0 | 0 | New |
| Jatiya Biplobi Front | 3,671 | 0.01 | 0 | 0 | 0 | New |
| Pragotishil Ganatantrik Sakt | 3,598 | 0.01 | 0 | 0 | 0 | New |
| Jatiya Janata Party (Ashraf) | 3,187 | 0.01 | 0 | 0 | 0 | New |
| Bangladesh Jatiya Tanti Dal | 3,115 | 0.01 | 0 | 0 | 0 | New |
| Bangladesh Muslim League (Yusuf) | 2,757 | 0.01 | 0 | 0 | 0 | New |
| Jatiya Jukta Front | 2,668 | 0.01 | 0 | 0 | 0 | New |
| Jatiya Janata Party (Asad) | 1,570 | 0.00 | 0 | 0 | 0 | New |
| Bangladesh National Congress | 1,421 | 0.00 | 0 | 0 | 0 | New |
| Jatiyatabadi Ganatantrik Chhashi Dal | 1,317 | 0.00 | 0 | 0 | 0 | New |
| Gano Azadi League (Samad) | 1,314 | 0.00 | 0 | 0 | 0 | New |
| Janasakti Party | 1,263 | 0.00 | 0 | 0 | 0 | New |
| Bangladesh Nezam-e-Islam Party | 1,236 | 0.00 | 0 | 0 | 0 | New |
| Islamic Samajtantrik Dal Bangladesh | 1,039 | 0.00 | 0 | 0 | 0 | New |
| Bangladesh Freedom League | 1,034 | 0.00 | 0 | 0 | 0 | New |
| Peoples Democratic Party | 879 | 0.00 | 0 | 0 | 0 | New |
| Bangladesh People's League (Goariobi Newaz) | 742 | 0.00 | 0 | 0 | 0 | New |
| Jatiya Mukti Dal | 723 | 0.00 | 0 | 0 | 0 | New |
| Bangladesh Jana Parishad | 686 | 0.00 | 0 | 0 | 0 | New |
| Muslim Peoples Party | 515 | 0.00 | 0 | 0 | 0 | New |
| Bangladesh Krishak Sramik Mukti Andolan | 503 | 0.00 | 0 | 0 | 0 | New |
| Bangladesh National Hindu Party | 502 | 0.00 | 0 | 0 | 0 | New |
| Jatiyatabadi Ganatantrik Dal | 496 | 0.00 | 0 | 0 | 0 | New |
| Democratic League | 453 | 0.00 | 0 | 0 | 0 | New |
| Humanitarian Organization for the Prevention of Smoking and Drug Abuse | 453 | 0.00 | 0 | 0 | 0 | New |
| Jatiya Tarun Sangha | 417 | 0.00 | 0 | 0 | 0 | New |
| Bangladesh Labour Party | 318 | 0.00 | 0 | 0 | 0 | New |
| Bangladesh Manobatabadi Dal | 294 | 0.00 | 0 | 0 | 0 | New |
| Ideal Party | 251 | 0.00 | 0 | 0 | 0 | New |
| National Awami Party (Sadequr Rahman) | 248 | 0.00 | 0 | 0 | 0 | New |
| Bangladesh Khilafat Party | 241 | 0.00 | 0 | 0 | 0 | New |
| Bangladesh Inquilab Party | 214 | 0.00 | 0 | 0 | 0 | New |
| Bangladesh Islamic Biplobi Parishad | 202 | 0.00 | 0 | 0 | 0 | New |
| Bangladesh Bekar Samaj | 182 | 0.00 | 0 | 0 | 0 | New |
| Bangladesh Adarsha Krishak Dal | 154 | 0.00 | 0 | 0 | 0 | New |
| Bangladesh Islamic Republican Party | 138 | 0.00 | 0 | 0 | 0 | New |
| Bangladesh Bekar Party | 39 | 0.00 | 0 | 0 | 0 | New |
| Jatiya Sramajibi Party | 28 | 0.00 | 0 | 0 | 0 | New |
| National Awami Party (Nur Mohammad Kazi) | 27 | 0.00 | 0 | 0 | 0 | New |
| Bangladesh Jatiya People's Party | 25 | 0.00 | 0 | 0 | 0 | New |
| Independents | 1,497,396 | 4.39 | 3 | 0 | 3 | –22 |
| Total | 34,103,777 | 100.00 | 300 | 30 | 330 | +30 |
| Valid votes | 34,103,777 | 98.92 | | | | |
| Invalid/blank votes | 374,026 | 1.08 | | | | |
| Total votes | 34,477,803 | 100.00 | | | | |
| Registered voters/turnout | 62,181,743 | 55.45 | | | | |
Source: Nohlen et al., Bangladesh Election Commission, Kumar Panday

== Aftermath ==
In September 1991 a constitutional referendum was held, which sought the transfer of executive powers from the President to the Prime Minister, making the presidency largely a ceremonial role. The vote was overwhelmingly in favour of the constitutional amendments, and the country returned to being a parliamentary democracy in line with its founding constitution.

Following the announcement of the general election results, AL President Sheikh Hasina alleged at a press conference that undemocratic forces had subtly manipulated the outcome. A letter by AL leader Kamal Hossain, written to the party's executive council, stirred considerable debate. In it, he attributed the party's defeat to overconfidence, arrogance, and lack of grassroots engagement. Hossain noted that many AL leaders and activists had assumed victory well in advance, leading to complacency. He also criticized the party's weak counter-campaign against right-wing and anti-independence forces who had portrayed the AL as pro-India and anti-religion.

Meanwhile, discussions continued between the BNP and Jamaat-e-Islami regarding government formation. Eventually, Jamaat-e-Islami formally communicated its support for the BNP to the acting president. On 20 March 1991, Khaleda Zia was sworn in as Prime Minister of Bangladesh.
