= 1978 Bangladeshi presidential election =

- 3 June 1978
- Turnout: 54.27%
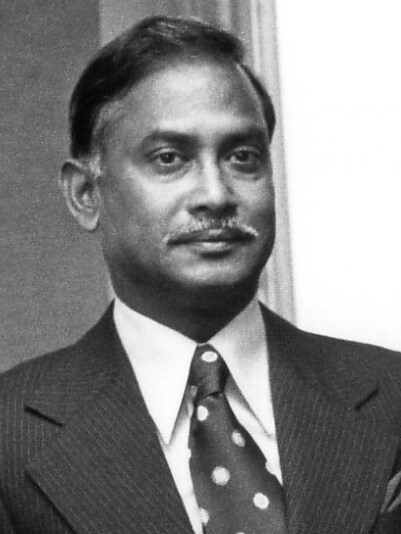

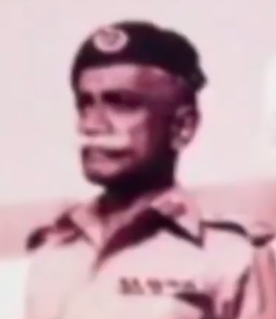
Candidate	Ziaur Rahman	M. A. G. Osmani
Party	Nationalist Front	Democratic Unity Alliance
Popular vote	15,733,807	4,455,200
Percentage	76.63%	21.70%
President before election
Ziaur Rahman
Military Junta
President
Ziaur Rahman
Nationalist Front

Presidential elections were held in Bangladesh on 3 June 1978. They were the first direct elections for presidency in the country, as the president had previously been elected by the Jatiya Sangsad. The result was a victory for Ziaur Rahman, who received 77% of the vote. Voter turnout was 54%.

They were the first presidential elections since the August 1975 coup that overthrew and killed president Sheikh Mujibur Rahman and led to a military regime. The 1978 elections were called by the regime to lend legitimacy to its rule. The elections took place amid martial law, repression of the political opposition and curtailment of press freedoms. Other political parties were weakly organized.

== Campaign ==
Prior to the elections six parties backing Ziaur Rahman – the Bangladesh Labour Party, the Bangladesh Muslim League, the Bangladesh Scheduled Caste Federation, Jatiyatabadi Ganatantrik Dal, the National Awami Party (Bhashani) and the United Peoples' Party – formed the Jatiyatabadi Front (Nationalist Front) to support his candidacy.

M. A. G. Osmani was also supported by an alliance of six parties under the name Ganatantrik Oikkya Jote (United Democratic Alliance). The alliance consisted of the Awami League, the Communist Party, the Gano Azadi League, the Jatiya Janata Party, the National Awami Party (Muzaffar) and the People's League.

A group of parties led by Ataur Rahman boycotted the elections, including the Democratic League, the Islamic Democratic League (Siddque), Jatiya Dal, the Jatiya League and the Krishak Sramik Party.

== Conduct ==
Retired General Khalilur Rahman stated that a "senior general" had given instructions to senior police officers that Zia should win at "any cost".

== Results ==
Candidate	Party	Votes	%
Ziaur Rahman	Jatiyatabadi Front	15,733,807	76.63
M. A. G. Osmani	Ganatantrik Oikkya Jote	4,455,200	21.70
Khabiruddin Ahmed	Independent	81,425	0.40
Abul Basher	Jatiya Janomukti Union	51,936	0.25
Azizul Islam	Independent	49,064	0.24
Golam Morshed	Independent	38,193	0.19
Abdus Samad	Islamic Democratic Group	37,273	0.18
Sirajul Huda	Jatiya Dal (Huda)	35,618	0.17
Abu Bakar Siddique	Independent	25,077	0.12
Abdul Hamid	Jatiya Gano Mukti	23,968	0.12
Total		20,531,561	100.00
Valid votes		20,531,561	98.31
Invalid/blank votes		354,010	1.69
Total votes		20,885,571	100.00
Registered voters/turnout		38,486,247	54.27
Source: Nohlen et al., Asian Affairs
