= 1973 Bangladeshi general election =

- 7 March 1973

300 of the 315 seats in the Jatiya Sangsad 151 seats needed for a majority
- Registered: 35,205,642
- Turnout: 54.91%
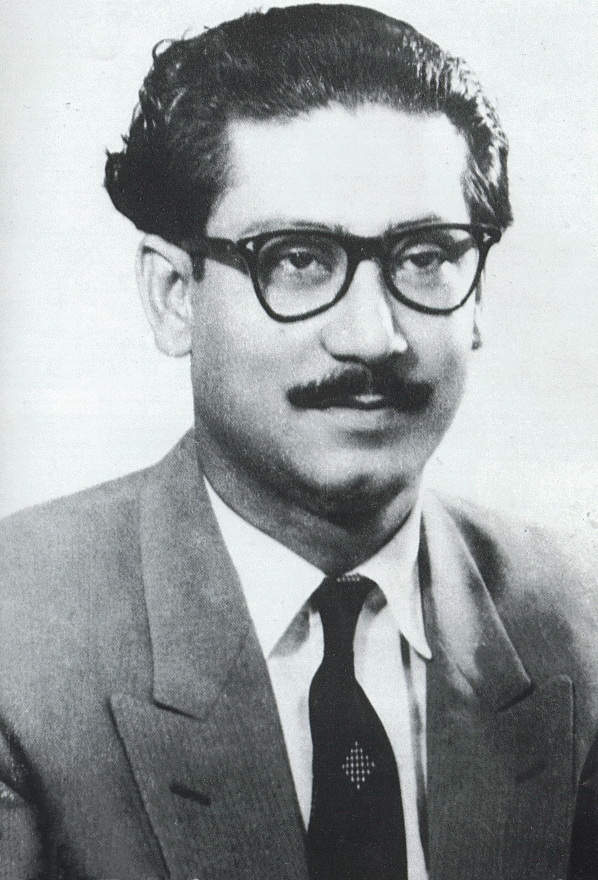

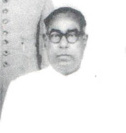
	First party	Second party	Third party
Leader	Sheikh Mujibur Rahman	Serajul Alam Khan	Ataur Rahman Khan
Party	AL	JSD	BJL
Last election	288 seats	–	0 seats
Seats won	293	1	1
Seat change	▲5	New	▲1
Popular vote	13,798,717	1,229,110	62,354
Percentage	73.20%	6.52%	0.33%
Prime Minister before election
Sheikh Mujibur Rahman
AL
Subsequent Prime Minister
Sheikh Mujibur Rahman
AL

General elections were held in newly independent Bangladesh on 7 March 1973, the first general election after the Bangladesh Liberation War. A total of 1,078 candidates and 14 political parties contested the elections.

Though the Awami League was already the clear favourite before the elections, the government led by its leader Sheikh Mujibur Rahman made a major effort to winning every seat. This led to an unnecessarily rigged election in which the Awami League won 293 of the 300 directly elected seats including eleven constituencies where they were elected unopposed without a vote. Voter turnout was 55%.

The result saw a near-complete obliteration of the opposition, with most of the leadership of opposition parties failing to win seats, including Mohammad Abdul Jalil (Jatiya Samajtantrik Dal), Rashed Khan Menon, Kazi Zafar Ahmed and Aleem al-Razee (National Awami Party (Bhashani)), and Suranjit Sengupta (National Awami Party (Muzaffar)).

== Campaign ==
In its election manifesto, the Awami League focused on four principles, nationalism, democracy, socialism and secularism. The pro-Soviet National Awami Party (Muzaffar) and Communist Party of Bangladesh highlighted concerns regarding corruption, political repression and the deterioration of law and order. Due to their alignment with the Awami League on fundamental policy matters, they were often considered the "B team" of the Awami League. The pro-Chinese National Awami Party (Bhashani) and Jatiya League concentrated on Indo-Bangladesh relations, leveraging the growing anti-India sentiment in the country. The campaign of the leftist Jatiya Samajtantrik Dal (JSD) centred around the theme of scientific socialism. During the campaign, which was marred by violence and allegations of voter intimidation, the parties accused each other of being foreign agents involved in conspiracies against the country's interests.

Among the competing parties, only the Awami League was able to field 300 candidates, covering all elected seats. This was followed by 237 candidates from the JSD, 224 from NAP-M, 169 from NAP-B and the remainder from other parties, as well as 120 independent candidates.

== Conduct ==
Prior to the elections, some opposition candidates in marginal constituencies were kidnapped by Awami League supporters before they were able to submit their nomination papers. In some constituencies where opposition candidates were leading in the vote count, counting was abruptly stopped, ballot boxes were stuffed with fake papers and the Awami League candidates were declared winners amid the strong presence of Awami League volunteers.

It was generally believed that the Awami League, with the appeal of Sheikh Mujib and its instrumental role in the independence of Bangladesh, would have easily won the elections without manipulation. However, the overwhelming margin of Awami League's victory was unexpected.

== Results ==
Party	Votes	%	Seats			
Party	Votes	%	General	Women	Total	+/–
Awami League	13,798,717	73.20	293	15	308	+10
National Awami Party (Muzaffar)	1,569,299	8.32	0	0	0	New
Jatiya Samajtantrik Dal	1,229,110	6.52	1	0	1	New
National Awami Party (Bhashani)	1,002,771	5.32	0	0	0	New
Bangladesh Jatiya League	62,354	0.33	1	0	1	+1
Bangla Jatiya League	53,097	0.28	0	0	0	New
Communist Party of Bangladesh	47,211	0.25	0	0	0	New
Sramik Krishak Samajbadi Dal	38,421	0.20	0	0	0	New
Bangladesh Communist Party (Leninist)	18,619	0.10	0	0	0	New
Bangladesh Shramik Federation	17,271	0.09	0	0	0	New
Banglar Communist Party	11,911	0.06	0	0	0	New
Bangla Chattra Union	7,564	0.04	0	0	0	New
Bangladesh Jatiya Congress	3,761	0.02	0	0	0	New
Jatiya Ganatantrik Dal	1,818	0.01	0	0	0	New
Independents	989,884	5.25	5	0	5	–2
Total	18,851,808	100.00	300	15	315	+5
Valid votes	18,851,808	97.53				
Invalid/blank votes	477,875	2.47				
Total votes	19,329,683	100.00				
Registered voters/turnout	35,205,642	54.91				
Source: Nohlen et al., Government of Bangladesh, Kumar Panday

=== Vote share by district ===
District	AL	NAP-M	NAP-B	JSD	Others
Rangpur	77.03	10.56	6.39	1.51	4.50
Dinajpur	78.52	8.30	4.56	0.76	7.86
Bogra	74.91	16.94	2.20	2.23	3.66
Rajshahi	74.93	8.95	4.23	8.45	3.44
Pabna	84.89	4.72	1.35	4.59	4.45
Kushtia	76.03	10.10	7.59	6.28	–
Jessore	77.44	3.29	9.14	6.33	3.80
Khulna	74.03	3.19	12.71	5.91	4.16
Patuakhali	73.14	14.07	1.09	1.09	10.61
Bakerganj	71.21	7.92	8.47	10.25	2.15
Tangail	56.42	5.28	16.82	19.44	2.03
Mymensingh	71.44	15.02	1.15	8.74	3.65
Dacca	76.05	7.37	3.51	5.62	7.45
Faridpur	87.90	3.42	0.81	2.76	5.10
Sylhet	67.70	14.40	3.56	4.79	9.55
Comilla	70.09	7.44	2.89	3.70	15.88
Noakhali	64.88	2.26	2.14	20.41	10.31
Chittagong	61.73	7.57	13.78	12.01	4.92
Chittagong H.T.	28.43	5.24	2.37	2.97	60.99
Source: Moten

All 300 members of the parliament were men, and 15 additional seats were reserved for women. These women members were not directly elected; instead, they were chosen by the parliament and affiliated with the Awami League. Of the parliament members, 32% were lawyers, 20% were in business, 13% were agriculturalists, 12% were social workers and trade unionists, 9% were doctors, 6% were teachers, 6% were journalists, 1% were engineers, and 1% were students.

== Reaction ==
The prime minister of India, Indira Gandhi and the British prime minister Edward Heath congratulated Sheikh Mujib on his electoral victory.

== Aftermath ==
The election results demoralized the opposition parties. Afterward, the National Awami Party (Muzaffar) and the Communist Party of Bangladesh went back to seek an alliance with the Awami League and formed a unified front called Gono Oikya Jote. The National Awami Party (Bhashani) tried and failed to launch a mass movement against the Awami League. However, Jatiya Samajtantrik Dal proved to be a strong force against the regime. Various left-wing factions also continued to oppose the government.

The popularity of Mujib, which played a crucial role in the Awami League's victory, led to a significant centralization of power within his inner circle, consisting of close relatives and companions. The Jatiya Sangsad had minimal involvement in policy formation, as Mujib and his associates managed even routine matters. The overwhelming victory of the Awami League was further overshadowed by the implementation of repressive special powers and activities of the Rakkhi Bahini, a group of government-armed vigilantes with judicial immunity. This group targeted anyone who opposed the Awami League or its affiliated parties. By the end of 1974 there were approximately 30,000 political prisoners and all criticism of the government in the public media was silenced by law, and a state of emergency was declared. Political assassinations became increasingly common, with around 5,000 reported in the year 1974 according to government estimates. Several prominent opposition leaders, including Siraj Sikder (the founder of the Proletarian Party of East Bengal) and Mosharraf Hossain (the founding vice-president of the JSD), were assassinated.

As the political and economic conditions of the country worsened, Mujib's popularity started to erode, and he started to face widespread criticism. In February 1975, Mujib revoked the constitution, assumed dictatorial powers and banned all political parties except for his newly formed party, Bangladesh Krishak Sramik Awami League. Within two years of the first general election, Bangladesh had ceased to be a democratic country.

== See also ==
- List of members of the 1st Jatiya Sangsad
