= Badrul Haider Chowdhury =

Chief Justice of Bangladesh

The Honourable Chief Justice Badrul Haider Chowdhury
- বদরুল হায়দার চৌধুরী

5th Chief Justice of Bangladesh
- In office 1 December 1989 – 1 January 1990
- President: Hussain Muhammad Ershad
- Preceded by: Fazle Kaderi Mohammad Abdul Munim
- Succeeded by: Shahabuddin Ahmed

Personal details
- Born: 1 January 1925 Noakhali District, Bengal Presidency, British India
- Died: 14 February 1998 (aged 73) Dhaka, Bangladesh
- Party: Bangladesh Awami League
- Children: Naima Haider
- Education: Calcutta University

Badrul Haider Chowdhury (1 January 1925 – 14 February 1998) was the Chief Justice of Bangladesh from 1 December 1989 to 31 December 1989.

== Early life and education ==
Chowdhury was born in 1925 in Noakhali District of the Bengal Presidency (now in Bangladesh) to Khan Bahadur Mohammed Gazi Chowdhury. In 1948, Chowdhury finished his graduate studies at the University of Kolkata and completed his law degree in 1951. In 1955, he became a Barrister as a member of Lincoln's Inn.

== Career ==
From 1965 to 1971, Chowdhury practiced at the Dhaka High court. On 1 April 1971 he was made of Judge of Dhaka High Court.

After the independence of Bangladesh, Chowdhury was made a judge of Bangladesh High court in January 1972. He was made a judge in the Appellate Division in 1978. His verdict on the 8th Amendment case was a landmark moment of Bangladesh's legal history. From 1 December 1989 to 1 January 1990, he was the chief justice of Bangladesh.

== Personal life ==
Chowdhury married Anwara Begum. His daughter Naima Haider became a justice of the Dhaka High Court.

On 14 February 1998, Chowdhury died in Dhaka, Bangladesh.
