= 1991 Bangladeshi presidential election =

- 8 October 1991
Nominee	Abdur Rahman Biswas	Badrul Haider Chowdhury
Party	BNP	AL
Electoral vote	172	92
President before election
Shahabuddin Ahmed (acting)
Independent
President
Abdur Rahman Biswas
BNP

Indirect presidential elections were held in Bangladesh on 8 October 1991, with the 330 members of the Jatiya Sangsad electing the president. This was the first indirect election after the restoration of the parliamentary system. Abdur Rahman Biswas was nominated by the ruling Bangladesh Nationalist Party and Badrul Haider Chowdhury was nominated by the Awami League.

Abdur Rahman Biswas was elected with 172 votes to the 92 received by Badrul Haider Chowdhury. He took the oath of office and took office on 10 October 1991. This was the last contested presidential election in Bangladesh until 2026.

== Results ==
Candidate	Party	Votes	%
Abdur Rahman Biswas	Bangladesh Nationalist Party	172	65.15
Badrul Haider Chowdhury	Awami League	92	34.85
Total		264	100.00
Registered voters/turnout		330	–
Source: Daily Star
