= 1996 Bangladeshi presidential election =

- 23 July 1996
Nominee	Shahabuddin Ahmed
Party	Independent
Electoral vote	Unopposed
President before election
Abdur Rahman Biswas
BNP
Elected President
Shahabuddin Ahmed
Independent

The Bangladeshi presidential election of 1996 was held on July 23, 1996. Shahabuddin Ahmed was elected after being nominated by the ruling party. He replaced Abdur Rahman Biswas when his five-year term came to an end. His inauguration ceremony was held October 9, 1996.
