= 2001 Bangladeshi presidential election =

- 12 November 2001
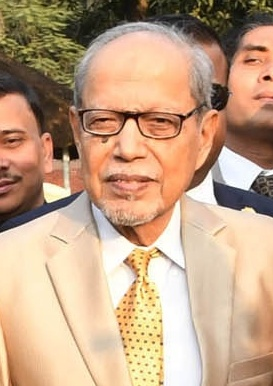
Candidate	A. Q. M. Badruddoza Chowdhury
Party	BNP
Electoral vote	Unopposed
President before election
Shahabuddin Ahmed
Independent
Elected President
A. Q. M. Badruddoza Chowdhury
BNP

The 2001 Bangladeshi presidential election was held on 12 November 2001. A. Q. M. Badruddoza Chowdhury won the election uncontestedly. Initially, two nomination papers were submitted. Later, the other contestant withdrew his nomination making Chowdhury elected to the post of President. Badruddoza sworn in on 14 November 2001, and assumed the office of President.
