= 2009 Bangladeshi presidential election =

- 16 February 2009
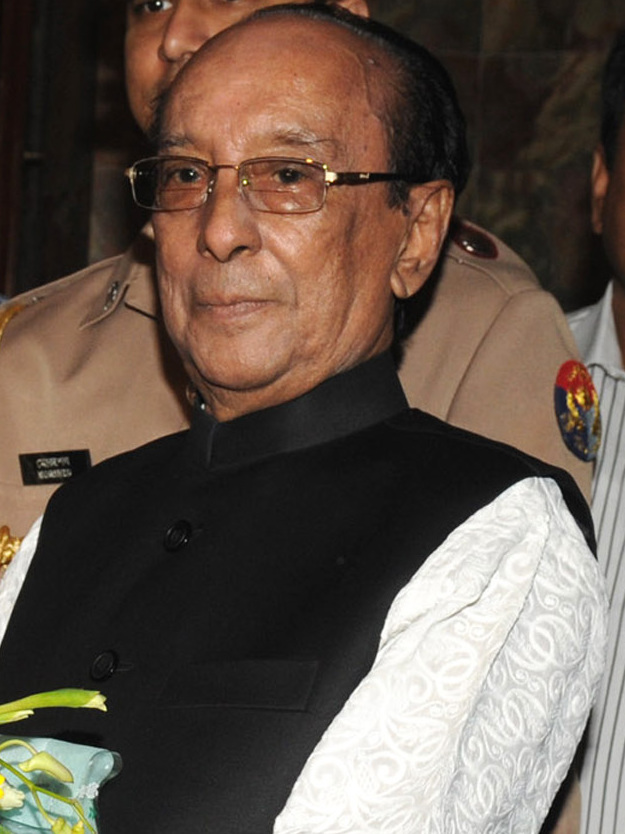
Nominee	Zillur Rahman
Party	AL
Electoral vote	Unopposed
President before election
Iajuddin Ahmed
Independent
Elected President
Zillur Rahman
AL

The 2009 Bangladeshi presidential election were due to be held in Bangladesh on 16 February 2009 following the 2008 parliamentary election. They were originally scheduled to have taken place by 5 September 2007, when Iajuddin Ahmed's term expired, but was postponed due to the lack of an elected parliament. The Awami League, which resoundingly won the parliamentary election, nominated AL presidium member Zillur Rahman as its candidate for president, and he was expected to be elected at the parliamentary session. Rahman was the only candidate who submitted his papers by the nomination deadline of 9 February 2009, and as he did not withdraw by the withdrawal deadline of 11 February 2009, the Election Commission declared him elected. He was sworn in on 12 February 2009.
