= 2002 Bangladeshi presidential election =

- 5 September 2002
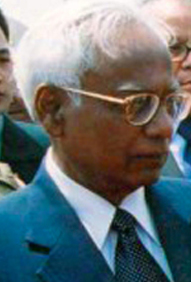
Nominee	Iajuddin Ahmed
Party	Independent
Electoral vote	Unopposed
President before election
Muhammad Jamiruddin Sircar (acting)
BNP
Elected President
Iajuddin Ahmed
Independent

The 2002 Bangladeshi presidential election were held in Bangladesh on 5 September 2002, after the resignation of the previous president A. Q. M. Badruddoza Chowdhury. The Election Commission declared Iajuddin Ahmed as the President after nomination papers of two other candidates were found to be invalid. Iajuddin Ahmed took his oath as president on 6 September 2002.
