= Jatiya League =

Defunct political party

Bangladesh National League বাংলাদেশ জাতীয় লীগ
- Abbreviation: BNL
- Founder: Ataur Rahman Khan
- Founded: 20 July 1968
- Split from: Awami League
- Preceded by: Pakistan National League

The Jatiya League, officially Bangladesh National League, which was founded as the National Progressive League, and later known as the Pakistan National League, is an unregistered political party in Bangladesh. Ataur Rahman Khan was the leader of the party. Later it was granted registration in Bangladesh on 21 September 1976.

However, in 2025, the Election Commission approved preliminary registration for Bangladesh Jatiya League. The Party asked the Election Commission to return the plough symbol to them which is currently being used by the Jatiya Party.

== Notable members ==
- Ataur Rahman Khan
- Oli Ahad
