= 1974 Bangladeshi presidential election =

- 24 January 1974
Candidate	Mohammad Mohammadullah
Party	AL
Electoral vote	Unopposed
President before election
Abu Sayed Chowdhury
AL
Elected President
Mohammad Mohammadullah
AL

The first indirect presidential election was held on 24 January 1974. This was the first and last presidential election under a parliamentary system before the presidential system was introduced in January 1975. Mohammad Mohammadullah was elected as the president by the National Assembly without any voting since there were no other candidates. Mohammad Mohammadullah was sworn in at Bangabhaban on 27 January 1974.
