= National Awami Party (Bhashani) =

Political party in East and West Pakistan

National Awami Party (Bhashani) ন্যাশনাল আওয়ামী পার্টি (ভাসানী)
- Leader: Abdul Hamid Khan Bhashani
- Founders: Abdul Hamid Khan Bhashani
- Founded: 30 November 1967
- Split from: NAP
- Merged into: JGD; NAP (Oikyo)
- Succeeded by: UPP; BNAP (Bhashani)
- Ideology: Islamic socialism Anti-imperialism; Anti-Sovietism; Third worldism
- Political position: Left-wing
- Religion: Deobandi Islam

Election symbol
- Sheaf of Paddy

Party flag

The National Awami Party (Bhashani) was a left wing political party in Bangladesh.

== History ==
The National Awami Party (Bhashani) was established on 30 November 1967 when the National Awami Party split into two different fractions. The pro-Moscow fraction was National Awami Party (Wali), led by Khan Abdul Wali Khan, and the pro-Beijing fraction was called National Awami Party (Bhashani), led by Abdul Hamid Khan Bhashani. On 17 November 1974, two leaders of the party, Kazi Zafar Ahmed and Rashed Khan Menon, formed a new political party called the United People's Party. Following this split, Bhashani resigned from post of party president. Later, after the military government gave green signal to political activities, it was granted registration in Bangladesh on 21 September 1976.

== See also ==
- National Awami Party (Muzaffar) or Bangladesh National Awami Party, successor of the Wali faction
- Bangladesh National Awami Party-Bangladesh NAP, successor of the Bhashani faction
