= Shahabuddin Ahmed =

President of Bangladesh (1990–1991; 1996–2001)

- শাহাবুদ্দিন আহমেদ
- Official portrait, 1990s

President of Bangladesh
- In office 9 October 1996 – 14 November 2001
- Prime Minister: Sheikh Hasina; Latifur Rahman (acting); Khaleda Zia
- Preceded by: Abdur Rahman Biswas
- Succeeded by: A. Q. M. Badruddoza Chowdhury
- Acting; 6 December 1990 – 10 October 1991
- Prime Minister: Khaleda Zia
- Preceded by: Hussain Muhammad Ershad
- Succeeded by: Abdur Rahman Biswas

8th Vice President of Bangladesh
- In office 6 December 1990 – 6 December 1990
- President: Hussain Muhammad Ershad
- Preceded by: Moudud Ahmed
- Succeeded by: position abolished

Chief Justice of Bangladesh
- In office 14 January 1990 – 31 January 1995
- President: Hussain Muhammad Ershad; Himself; Abdur Rahman Biswas
- Prime Minister: Kazi Zafar Ahmed; Khaleda Zia
- Preceded by: Badrul Haider Chowdhury
- Succeeded by: Muhammad Habibur Rahman

Personal details
- Born: 1 February 1930 Pemai, Bengal, British India
- Died: 19 March 2022 (aged 92) Dhaka, Bangladesh
- Party: Independent
- Children: 5
- Education: University of Dhaka (MA, International Relations)

Shahabuddin Ahmed (Note: American English pronunciation; Bengali: শাহাবুদ্দিন আহমেদ, pronounced [ˈʃɑɦɑbudːin ˈɑɦmed].) (1 February 1930 – 19 March 2022) was a Bangladeshi jurist and statesman who served as the president of Bangladesh from 1996 to 2001 and as the chief justice of Bangladesh from 1990 to 1995. He previously served as the acting president during 1990–91 when Hussain Muhammad Ershad resigned from the post. He headed a interim government and oversaw a general election in February 1991.

== Early life and education ==
Ahmed was born on 1 February 1930 in Pemai village, then in the British Bengal Presidency, today part of Kendua in the Netrokona District of Bangladesh. His father Talukdar Resat Ahmed Bhuiyan was a philanthropist. After passing the matriculation and intermediate examinations he gained admission into the University of Dhaka in 1948, obtained a bachelor's degree in economics in 1951 and a master's in international relations in 1952 as a resident student of Fazlul Haq Hall. He attended a special course in public administration at the University of Oxford.

== Career ==
Ahmed joined the Civil Service of Pakistan in 1954, completed training in the Lahore Civil Services Academy and at the University of Oxford. He was sub-divisional officer of Gopalganj and Natore. In addition he was a deputy commissioner of Faridpur. In 1960, he was transferred to the judicial branch. He worked as additional district and session judge of Dhaka and Barisal, and as district and sessions judge of Comilla and Chittagong. In 1967, he served as a registrar of the High Court of the then East Pakistan in Dhaka. He was elevated to the bench of the High Court on 20 January 1972 and acted on deputation at the Labour Appellate Tribunal for two years, 1973 and 1974.

Ahmed was appointed a judge of the appellate division of the Supreme Court of Bangladesh on 7 February 1980 and was confirmed in this office on 15 April 1981. Ahmed was the chairman of the Commission of Inquiry established under the Commission of Inquiry Act on police firing on the students in mid-February 1983. He was the chairman of the National Pay Commission in 1984 and submitted a report which provided the basis for the upward revision of pay scales.

=== Interim government (1990–1991) ===
Ahmed was appointed the chief justice of Bangladesh on 14 January 1990. Following a public agitation which was led by opposition political parties bent on changing the autocratic system of government and the resignation of the government headed by the then president Hussain Muhammad Ershad, on 6 December 1990, the-then vice-president Moudud Ahmed resigned and Ahmed was appointed the new vice-president. Later that day Ershad resigned and Ahmed took over as the acting president of the country.

Ahmed was chosen by all political parties including Ershad to hold the interim government that would oversee the neutral election to parliament. He administered the oath of office to his council of advisors at Bangabhaban on 9 December 1990 and held the first meeting on 15 December 1990. After the 1991 general election held on 27 February 1991, Ahmed handed over the parliamentary ruling power to the newly elected Prime Minister Khaleda Zia. He resigned from the presidency on 9 October 1991 and the next day returned to his previous post of chief justice from which he eventually retired on 1 February 1995.

=== President of Bangladesh (1996–2001) ===
Ahmed was elected president unopposed on 23 July 1996 after having been nominated by the Awami League government and sworn in on 9 October the same year. He retired from office on 14 November 2001. When the Awami League lost the parliamentary elections in 2001, he was dubbed a "betrayer" by Sheikh Hasina. He lamented "I am an angel if anything is done according to their desire, otherwise I am a devil."

=== Philanthropy ===
Ahmed was chairman of the Bangladesh Red Crescent Society, from August 1978 to April 1982 in addition to his duties as a judge of the Supreme Court. He set up a number of rural hospitals maternity centres, in particular, the Teligati Red Crescent Hospital, Netrakona which was financed by the Swiss Red Cross. He was a member of the Bangladesh government delegation to the 10th Conference of Foreign Ministers of the Islamic countries (OIC) held in Fez, Morocco in 1979 where the question of setting up an International Islamic Red Crescent Society was debated. On his initiative family planning and population control was included in the main function of the Bangladesh Red Crescent Society.

== Personal life and legacy ==
Ahmed was married to Anowara Begum. Together they had two sons and three daughters including Sitara Parvin. Parvin, a professor of mass communication and journalism at the University of Dhaka, died on a road accident in the USA in 2005.

In 2008, a lake in Gulshan, Dhaka was named Rastrapati Bicharpati Shahabuddin Ahmed Park after Ahmed.

In February 2022, Ahmed was taken to the intensive care unit (ICU) of the Combined Military Hospital (CMH) due to an aging-associated disease. He died on 19 March at the age of 92. Justice Shahabuddin Ahmed Park in Gulshan was named after him.
