= Jatiyatabadi Ganatantrik Dal =

Jatiyatabadi Ganatantrik Dal জাতীয়তাবাদী গণতান্ত্রিক দল
- Abbreviation: JAGODAL
- Coordinator: Abdus Sattar
- Founder: Abdus Sattar
- Founded: 22 February 1978
- Dissolved: 28 August 1978
- Succeeded by: Bangladesh Nationalist Party
- Headquarters: Dacca
- Ideology: Nationalism; Big tent
- National affiliation: Bangladesh Nationalist Front

The Jatiyatabadi Ganatantrik Dal (Bengali: জাতীয়তাবাদী গণতান্ত্রিক দল, lit. 'Nationalist Democratic Party') was a political faction of the supporters of the then-president of Bangladesh Ziaur Rahman, under the coordination of then-vice president Abdus Sattar Justice. It is considered as the principle predecessor of the modern Bangladesh Nationalist Party that was formed on 1 September 1978.
