= Gano Azadi League =

Bangladeshi political party

- President: Iskandar Mirza
- Founder: Abdur Rashid Tarkabagish
- Founded: 1976
- Split from: Awami League

Bangladesh Gano Azadi League (Bangladesh People's Freedom League) is a political party in Bangladesh, founded by Maulana Abdur Rashid Tarkabagish in 1976. The party president is Iskandar Mirza. The party is a member of the centre-left 11-Party Alliance.

The party was briefly allied with the Awami League in the 1980s.

In the 2001 parliamentary elections the party ran three candidates, in the 3 Nowabganj constituencies. Samad stood in the constituency Nawabganj-3, and got 468 votes (2.15%). In Nawabganj-1, party candidate Mohammed Nazrul Islam got 108 votes (0.04%) and in Nowabganj-2 Mohammed Bazlur Rahman got 204 votes (0.09%).
