= Sramik Krishak Samajbadi Dal =

Political party in Bangladesh

Sramik Krishak Samajbadi Dal শ্রমিক কৃষক সমাজবাদী দল
- General Secretary: Nirmal Sen
- Founded: 1969
- Ideology: Marxism-Leninism Communism
- Political position: Far-left

Sramik Krishak Samajbadi Dal (Workers Peasants Socialist Party) is a Marxist-Leninist political party in Bangladesh. The SKSD was formed in 1969 by sympathizers of the Revolutionary Socialist Party of India in East Pakistan.

In April 1983, the SKSD joined the 15-party alliance, which included the Awami League, to oppose the Ershad regime. When the alliance split over the question of whether to participate in the 1986 general election, the SKSD remained allied with four other left-leaning parties that pledged to boycott any elections held under Ershad. In 1994, the SKSD joined eight other left-wing parties to form the Left Democratic Front, which formed the core of the 11-party alliance in 1996. The alliance contested the June 1996 and 2001 general elections, but failed to win any seat. In the 2001 parliamentary elections, Nirmal Sen was the sole SKSD candidate. The 11-party alliance disintegrated in 2005.

The general secretary of the party is Nirmal Sen. The party publishes Samajbadi (The Socialist).

SKSD is currently (2005) the coordinator of LDF. The student wing of SKSD is the Samajbadi Chhatra Jote and the agricultural labour wing is the Khet Majdur Sabha.
