= United Peoples' Party (Bangladesh) =

Political party in Bangladesh

The United Peoples' Party (UPP) was a Bangladeshi political organisation founded by Kazi Zafar Ahmed in 1974.

== History ==
Ahmed took the UPP to a coalition government with President Ziaur Rahman after he assumed the presidency through a referendum. Ahmed became Minister of Education, but left the coalition due to irreconcilable differences. However, many of his former colleagues joined Zia's new party, the Bangladesh Nationalist Party (BNP). Ahmed also played a leading role in the anti military role of President Hussain Muhammad Ershad. However, the period since 1975 in Bangladesh witnessed a realignment of politics and leaders leaving their old parties and joining new ones. Ahmed dissolved his UPP and joined President Ershad's Jatiya Party (JP)
