= List of ideological symbols =

This is a partial list of symbols and labels used by political parties, groups or movements around the world. Some symbols are associated with one or more worldwide ideologies and used by many parties that support a particular ideology. Others are region or country-specific.

== Colours ==
=== Worldwide ===
- Black – anarchism, black power, Italian fascism, Jihadism, pirate parties
- Blue – conservatism, pro-Europeanism, right-wing politics, Zionism, American liberalism, Japanese liberalism
- Brown – far-right politics, Nazism
- Gold – capitalism, classical liberalism, right-libertarianism
- Green – agrarianism, anarcho-primitivism, animal rights, black nationalism, capitalism, environmentalism, Islamism, green anarchism, green politics, Irish republicanism
- Gray – independent politicians
- Lavender – LGBT movements, transgender rights movement, feminism
- Magenta – centrism, social liberalism
- Maroon – black nationalism, far-left politics, Marxism-Leninism, Trotskyism
- Orange – centrism, Christian democracy, classical liberalism, mutualist anarchism, populism, Ulster unionism
- Pink – feminism, LGBT movements, transgender rights movement
- Purple – monarchism, progressivism, radical feminism, royalism
- Red – communism, left-wing politics, Marxism, republicanism, social democracy, socialism, American conservatism, Japanese nationalism
- Saffron – Hindu nationalism
- Teal – animal rights, egoist anarchism, environmentalism, independent politicians
- White – anti-communism, independent politicians, monarchism, pacifism, peace, white nationalism, Zionism
- Yellow – liberalism, right-libertarianism

=== Armenia ===
- Gold and red – Hosank

=== Australia ===
- Blue – Liberal Party of Australia
- Green – Australian Greens
- Green – National Party of Australia
- Red – Australian Labor Party

=== Barbados ===
- Red and Gold – Barbados Labour Party
- Yellow – Democratic Labour Party (Barbados)

=== Brazil ===
- Blue – Brazilian Integralist Action
- Green, yellow, blue and white – Brazilian Labour Renewal Party

=== Bangladesh ===
- Blue, red and green – Bangladesh Nationalist Party
- Fern Green – Bangladesh Jamaat Islami
- Green – Bangladesh Awami League
- Red – Communist Party of Bangladesh
- Yellow – Jatiyo Party
- Red – Socialist Party of Bangladesh

=== Canada ===
- Blue – Conservative Party of Canada
- Green – Green Party of Canada
- Light blue – Bloc Québécois
- Orange – New Democratic Party
- Red – Liberal Party of Canada
- Purple – People's Party of Canada
- Red – Communist Party of Canada
- Red and yellow – Communist Party of Canada (Marxist–Leninist)

=== Chile ===
- Blue – Christian Democratic Party
- Orange and navy blue – National Libertarian Party

=== Equitoral Guinea ===
- Green, grey and ochre – United National Workers' Party

=== Finland ===
- Black and dark blue – Blue-and-Black Movement
- Gold, blue, and white – Finns Party
- Gold and white – Freedom Alliance
- White, red, and crimson – New Communist Party of Finland
- Yellow – Truth Party

=== France ===
- Purple – La France Insoumise
- Red – Parti Communiste Français
- Pink and green – Parti Socialiste
- Green – Europe Ecologie Les Verts
- Pink and teal – Génération.s
- Orange – Mouvement Démocrate
- Navy blue (official) and yellow (customary) – Renaissance
- Blue – Les Républicains
- Dark blue – Rassemblement National

=== Georgia ===
- Garnet, black and white – Georgian National Unity

=== Germany ===
- Light blue – Alternative for Germany
- Green – The III Path

=== Guatemala ===
- Red and blue – Victoria

=== Hungary ===
- Green and gold – Christian Democratic People's Party
- Orange – Fidesz
- Red, white, and green – Arrow Cross Party

=== Italy ===
- Black and red – South Tyrolean People's Party
- Azure – The People of Freedom

=== India ===
- Blue – Bahujan Samaj Party
- Blue – Mizo National Front
- Blue, red, and green – Rashtiya Lok Janshakti Party and Lok Janshakti Party (Ram Vilas)
- Blue, white, and green – Yuvajana Sramika Rythu Congress Party
- Bright green – All India Trinamool Congress
- Deep green – Biju Janata Dal
- Blue – Aam Aadmi Party
- Green – All India Anna Dravida Munnetra Kazhagam
- Green – All India Majlis-e-Ittehadul Muslimeen, Janata Dal (Secular)
- Green – Jharkhand Mukti Morcha
- Green – National People's Party (India)
- Green and yellow – Rashtriya Loktantrik Party
- Maize and green – Indigenous People's Front of Tripura
- Navy blue and orange – Shiromani Akali Dal
- Pacific Blue – Nationalist Congress Party
- Pink – Janta Congress Chhattisgarh and Bharat Rashtra Samithi & Nationalist Congress Party
- Red – All India Forward Bloc, Communist Party of India, Communist Party of India (Marxist), Left Front, Revolutionary Socialist Party (India)
- Red – Sikkim Krantikari Morcha
- Red and black – Dravida Munnetra Kazhagam
- Red and green – Samajwadi Party
- Saffron and green – Bharatiya Janata Party
- Sky blue – Indian National Congress
- White – other parties and independents
- Yellow – Right to Recall Party
- Yellow – Telugu Desam Party
- Yellow and green – Jannayak Janta Party

=== Iran ===
- Turquoise, blue and brown – NEDA Party
- Sky Blue – Union of Islamic Iran People Party

=== Ireland ===
- Blue – Fine Gael
- Dark green – Sinn Féin
- Dark green and white – The National Party
- Green – Fianna Fáil
- Green and gold – Green Party
- Magenta – People Before Profit–Solidarity
- Purple – Social Democrats
- Red – Labour Party

=== Japan ===
- Blue – Constitutional Democratic Party
- Blue and pink – Komeito
- Red – Liberal Democratic Party, Communist Party

=== Lebanon ===
- Green, white, and brown – Kataeb Party
- Black, red, and white – Syrian Social Nationalist Party in Lebanon

=== Mexico ===
- Black and red – Camisas Rojas
- Red, white, and green – National Synarchist Union
- Green, gold, and black – Nationalist Front of Mexico

=== The Netherlands ===
- Azure and navy – Christian Union
- Green – Christian Democratic Appeal
- Green – Democrats 66
- Green – Farmer–Citizen Movement
- Green – Party for the Animals
- Red, green, pink, and mint green – Progressive Netherlands
- Maroon – Forum for Democracy
- Navy and red – JA21
- Orange – Reformed Political Party
- Orange and blue – People's Party for Freedom and Democracy
- Purple – Volt
- Red – Socialist Party
- Red, white, and blue – Party for Freedom
- Turquoise – DENK

=== New Zealand ===
- Yellow, cyan, and magenta – ACT New Zealand
- Green – Green Party of Aotearoa New Zealand
- Red – New Zealand Labour Party
- Blue – New Zealand National Party
- Black, navy blue, and gold – New Zealand First
- Black and red – Te Pāti Māori
- Cyan – The Opportunity Party (TOP)

=== Norway ===
- Green – Centre Party
- Yellow and black – Christian People's Party
- Green (official) and light green (customary) – Environment Party The Greens
- Blue – Høyre
- Orange and azure – Industry and Business Party
- Red – Labour Party
- Purple – Liberalistene
- Navy blue – Progress Party
- Red (official) and maroon (customary) – Red Party
- Red, green, and purple (customary) – Socialist Left Party
- Teal – Venstre

=== Palestine ===
- Yellow – Fatah
- Green – Hamas

=== Peru ===
- Orange – Fujimorism

=== Portugal ===
- Blue – People's Monarchist Party
- Dark blue – Chega
- Green – Ecologist Party "The Greens"
- Green – Earth Party
- Green – Together for the People
- Green – LIVRE
- Orange – Social Democratic Party
- Red – Portuguese Communist Party
- Red – Portuguese Workers' Communist Party
- Red (official) and maroon (customary) – Left Bloc
- Red (official) and pink (customary) – Socialist Party
- Sky blue – CDS – People's Party
- Sky blue – Liberal Initiative
- Teal – People Animals Nature

=== Russia ===
- White, blue and red – United Russia
- Red – Communist Party
- Yellow and maroon – A Just Russia – For Truth
- Blue and yellow (official), light blue (customary) – LDPR
- Turquoise and black – New People

=== Rwanda ===
- Sky blue – Rwandan Patriotic Front

=== Serbia ===
- Grey – Party of Serbian Unity
- Red and white – Serbian Action
- Yellow – Democratic Party (Serbia)

=== Slovakia ===
- Dark blue and white – Slovak Togetherness
- Green – People's Party Our Slovakia
- White, blue and red – Slovak People's Party

=== South Africa ===
- Black, green and gold – African National Congress
- Orange, white, blue, and green – Afrikaner Volksfront
- Red, white and black – Afrikaner Weerstandsbeweging
- Blue – Democratic Alliance
- Maroon – Economic Freedom Fighters
- Orange, white and blue – Herstigte Nasionale Party
- Red, black and yellow – South African Communist Party

=== Sweden ===
- Blue – Moderate Party
- Blue and white – Christian Democrats
- Blue and white – Liberals
- Green – Centre Party
- Light green – Green Party
- Orange and blue – Alliance
- Pink – Feminist Initiative
- Purple – Pirate Party
- Crimson – Left Party
- Red – Swedish Social Democratic Party
- Red and green – Red-Greens
- Yellow and light-blue – Sweden Democrats

=== Syria ===
- Black, red and white – Syrian Social Nationalist Party

=== Turkey ===
- Blue – Good Party
- Purple – Peoples' Democratic Party
- Red – Nationalist Movement Party
- Red – Republican People's Party
- Red, yellow, white – Communist Party of Turkey (modern)
- Red and white – Great Unity Party
- Yellow – Justice and Development Party

=== United Kingdom ===
- Blue – Conservative Party
- Green – Green Party
- Green, yellow, and red – Plaid Cymru
- Amber and orange – Liberal Democrats
- Purple and gold – UKIP
- Red – Labour Party
- Red, white, and blue – DUP
- Turquoise and white – Reform UK
- Yellow and black – SNP
- Navy blue - Restore Britain

=== United States ===
- Black, gold, white and maroon – American Indian Movement
- Blue – Democratic Party
- Blue and buff – Whig Party (United States)
- Gold with dark gray, sometimes with dark blue or purple – Libertarian Party
- Green – Green Party
- Orange – American Solidarity Party (Christian democracy)
- Purple – politically mixed or moderate regions; Constitution Party, Reform Party, Veterans Party of America
- Red – Republican Party
- Teal and white – Justice Party
- White or gray – senior citizens, women's voting rights, third parties (other than the Greens), independent candidates and voters

=== Venezuela ===
- Red and black – Revolutionary Movement Tupamaro
- Red – United Socialist Party of Venezuela

== Icons ==
=== Worldwide ===
- a³ (lowercase a, cubed) – Agorism
- Ballot – democracy
- Beehive – co-operative movement
- Bird in flight – classical liberalism, right-libertarianism
- Black rose – anarchism
- Arrow Cross – Hungarism
- Black sail – pirate parties
- Black sun – esoteric Nazism, neo-Nazism, white nationalism
- Bear – Putinism, Russian conservatism
- Carnation – social democracy, democratic socialism
- Cat, wildcat – syndicalism, symbol of Industrial Workers of the World, Georgism
- Celtic cross – white nationalism, neo-Nazism, white pride, Irish nationalism, Celtic neopaganism
- ✝ Christian cross – Christianity
- Cross and sickle – Christian communism
- Ⓐ Circumscribed A – anarchism
- ⚙ Cogwheel – Labour movement, working class, agriculturalism
- Constitution – democracy
- Cross of Burgundy – Spanish nationalism, Carlism, nostalgia for the Spanish Empire, Rexism
- ☨ Cross of Lorraine – Gaullism
- Cross of Saint Peter – Satanism, Opposition to Christianity, Anti-Christian sentiment
- Cross potent – Roman Catholicism, Austrofascism
- ♕ Crown – monarchism
- 🕊 Dove – love and/or peace (often used by pacifist groups)
- Eagle – nationalism, patriotism, conservatism
- Easter lily (calla lily) – Irish republicanism, Irish nationalism
- Fasces – fascism, neo-fascism, Italian fascism, magisterial power, authority
- Fist and rose – socialism, social democracy, left-wing politics, center-left politics
- Flash and circle – British fascism
- 🍀 Four-leaf clover – agrarianism, Hibernophila, Irish nationalism, good luck
- 🌐 Globe – globalism, neoliberalism, Internationalism
- ☭ Hammer and sickle – communism, Marxism–Leninism
- Hammer, sickle and brush – Juche, Kimilsungism–Kimjongilism
- Hawk of Quraish – Arab nationalism, Pan-Arabism
- Heart ensigned with a crosslet (Sacred Heart) – Integralism
- Labrys – Lesbian feminism, Metaxism, Matriarchy, Third Positionism, Révolution nationale, Nazi-Maoism
- Lambda – Identitarianism, Nouvelle Droite
- Lion – Nobility, Judeo Christianity, Rastafari
- Machete and Gear – Angolanidade
- ♂ Mars symbol - masculinity
- 📰 Newspaper – democracy, press freedom
- Nordic cross – Nordic model, social democracy
- Olive tree – peace, community, health
- Parthenon – democracy
- ☮ Peace sign – peace, pacifism, nuclear disarmament, democracy
- Plough – communism, agrarian socialism, peasant movement, peasants rights
- Poppy – remembrance, WW1 and WW2
- Protest sign – democracy and resistance to tyranny
- Rainbow or rainbow flag – LGBT rights
- Raised fist – solidarity, syndicalism, unity, resistance, communism, radicalism in general
- Rebel Alliance – democracy and resistance to tyranny
- ⚑ Red flag – socialism, communism, anti-fascism, revolution
- ★ Red star – socialism, Marxism, communism, Neozapatismo
- ▼ Red inverted triangle - left-wing politics and memorials to the victims of Nazi Germany, more recently support for Palestine
- Red wedge (from Beat the Whites with the Red Wedge, 1919) – originally anti-White movement, now communism (e.g. Network of Communists) and broadly left-wing politics (e.g. Red Wedge)
- Red whirlwind (Zawba'a) – Syrian Social Nationalism (since 1932)
- Ribbon of Saint George – Anti-Maidan, Pro-war nationalist opposition to Vladimir Putin, support for the Russian invasion of Ukraine
- Rose – social democracy, democratic socialism
- Runic letters – various letters of the runic alphabet – particularly the Algiz, Eihwaz, Odal, Sowilō, and Tiwaz runes – have been used by various neo-Nazi and white supremacist groups post-WW2. However, these runes are also very commonly used by non-racialist Heathens and followers of Germanic Neopaganism in an apolitical context.
- Shahada – Wahhabism, Islamism
- Sigma – Brazilian integralism, Manosphere
- Six Arrows – Kemalism
- Smiling Sun – anti-nuclear movement
- St. Michael's Cross (Archangel Michael Cross) – Legionarism, Neo-Legionarism
- ✡ Star of David – Jewish people
- Starry Plough – Irish republican socialism
- 🗽 Statue of Liberty – liberty, democracy, American democracy
- 🌻 Sunflower – green politics
- Swastika – Nazism, fascism, neo-Nazism; Hindu, Jain, or Buddhist theology (original use)
- Three Arrows – mid-20th century European social democracy; the arrows represent anti-fascism, anti-communism, and anti-monarchism
- Three-finger salute (pro-democracy) – democracy and resistance to tyranny, Boy scouts of America.
- Throne, sword and altar – conservatism
- Torch – right-libertarianism, conservatism, patriotism, classical liberalism
- Triskelion – Polytheistic reconstructionism, Celtic neopaganism
- Upside-down crown – republicanism, anti-monarchism
- ♀ Venus symbol – femininity
- Venus symbol and raised fist combined – feminism
- ✌ V sign – voluntarism, peace, victory, veganism
- ⚖ Weighing scale – law, justice, legal egalitarianism
- Wolf salute – Pan-Turkism
- Wolfsangel – Azov movement, Ukrainian nationalism, Third Positionism, neo-Nazism, rebellion
- Yoke and arrows – Falangism, Francoism

=== Bangladesh ===
- Boat – Bangladesh Awami League
- Sheaf of Paddy – Bangladesh Nationalist Party
- Plough – Jatiya Party

=== Belgium ===
- Circled upright triangle – Vlaamsch Nationaal Verbond
- Inverted Arrow Cross – French National-Collectivist Party
- Bold rooster (coq hardi) – Walloon Movement, Rassemblement Wallonie France, Wallonie Libre, Walloon Rally
- Red inverted triangle – opposition to far-right politics, opposition to genocide, support for workers' rights, and remembrance of the Belgian Resistance (often worn as a lapel pin)
- Sword, cog and plough – Verdinaso

=== Brazil ===
- Dove and olive branch – Brazilian Socialist Party
- Fist and rose – Democratic Labour Party (Brazil)
- Oak tree – Republicans (Brazil)
- Red star – Workers' Party (Brazil)
- Toucan – Brazilian Social Democracy Party
- Sigma – Brazilian Integralist Action, Brazilian Integralist Front

=== Cambodia ===
- Devata – Cambodian People's Party
- Golden Angkor Wat – Khmer Rouge

=== Canada ===
- Red maple leaf — Liberal Party of Canada
- Red maple leaf within the letter C — Conservative Party of Canada
- Orange maple leaf — New Democratic Party
- Orange torch — National Unity Party of Canada

=== Colombia ===
- letter C – Colombian Conservative Party
- letter L – Colombian Liberal Party
- letter U – Social National Unity Party ("Party of the U")

=== Costa Rica ===
- Golden torch – People's Vanguard Party

=== Croatia ===
- letter U – Ustaša – Croatian Revolutionary Movement

=== Denmark ===
- letter A – Social Democrats
- Rose – Social Democrats
- letter B – Social Liberal Party
- letter C – Conservative People's Party
- letter F – Socialist People's Party
- letter I – Liberal Alliance
- letter K – Christian Democrats
- letter N – People's Movement against the EU
- letter O – Danish People's Party
- letter Ø – Red-Green Alliance
- letter V – Venstre, Liberal Party of Denmark
- Tiwaz rune – Neo-Nazism, Nordic Resistance Movement

=== Finland ===
- Tiwaz rune – Neo-Nazism, Nordic Resistance Movement

=== Germany ===
- Swastika - used on the flag of the Nazi Party and Flag of Nazi Germany, also represents neo-Nazism, nationally banned with few exceptions
- ▼ Red inverted triangle
  - before 1945 - political prisoners, resistance fighters, and others in concentration camps in Nazi Germany and occupied Europe

=== Greece ===
- Green Sun - Panhellenic Socialist Movement
- Compass - Greek Solution
- Meandros - Golden Dawn
- Swastika - Golden Dawn (Greece)
- Hand holding a Torch - Nea Dimokratia

=== Hong Kong ===
- Yellow Umbrella - pro-democracy symbol popularized in 2014 Hong Kong protests

=== Hungary ===
- Arrow Cross - Arrow Cross Party

=== Iceland ===
- Tiwaz rune – Nordic Resistance Movement

=== India ===
- Ard – Bodoland People's Front (Jharkhand)
- Arrow – Janata Dal (United) (Bihar, Jharkhand, Karnataka, Nagaland)
- Banana – All Jharkhand Students Union (Jharkhand)
- Bicycle – Jammu and Kashmir National Panthers Party (Jammu and Kashmir), Samajwadi Party (Uttar Pradesh), Telugu Desam Party (Andhra Pradesh)
- Book – National People's Party
- Bow and arrow – Jharkhand Mukti Morcha (Jharkhand), Shiv Sena (Maharashtra)
- Broom – Aam Aadmi Party
- Bungalow – Lok Janshakti Party (Bihar)
- Candles – People's Democratic Front (Meghalaya)
- Car – Telangana Rashtra Samithi
- Ceiling fan – Rashtriya Lok Samta Party (Bihar), YSR Congress Party (Andhra Pradesh, Telangana)
- Clock – Nationalist Congress Party
- Coconut – Goa Forward Party (Goa)
- Conch – Biju Janata Dal (Odisha)
- Crown – People's Democratic Alliance (Meghalaya)
- Dao – Indigenous People's Front of Tripura (Tripura)
- Drum – United Democratic Party (Meghalaya) (Meghalaya)
- Ears of maize and sickle – Communist Party of India
- Elephant – Asom Gana Parishad (Assam), Bahujan Samaj Party (with the exception of the states of Assam and Sikkim where certain state parties use the elephant)
- Five-pointed star – Mizo National Front (Mizoram)
- Farmer ploughing (within square farm) – Janta Congress Chhattisgarh (Chhattisgarh)
- Flowers and grass – All India Trinamool Congress
- Glasses – Indian National Lok Dal (Haryana)
- Globe – Nationalist Democratic Progressive Party (Nagaland)
- Hammer, sickle and star – Communist Party of India (Marxist)
- Hand pump – Rashtriya Lok Dal (Uttar Pradesh)
- Hurricane lamp – Rashtriya Janata Dal (Bihar, Jharkhand)
- Ink pot and pen – People's Democratic Party (Jammu and Kashmir)
- Jug – All India N.R. Congress (Puducherry)
- Key – Jannayak Janta Party (Haryana)
- Lightbulb – Mizoram People's Conference (Mizoram)
- Locomotive – Maharashtra Navnirman Sena (Maharashtra)
- Maize – People's Party of Arunachal (Arunachal Pradesh)
- Mango – Pattali Makkal Katchi (Puducherry)
- Kite – People's Party of Punjab (Punjab), All India Majlis-e-Ittehadul Muslimeen (Telangana)
- Ladder – Muslim League (Kerala)
- Lady farmer carrying paddy on her head – Janata Dal (Secular) (Arunachal Pradesh, Karnataka, Kerala)
- Lion – All India Forward Bloc (West Bengal), Hill State People's Democratic Party (Meghalaya), Maharashtrawadi Gomantak Party (Goa)
- Lock and key – All India United Democratic Front (Assam)
- Lotus – Bharatiya Janata Party
- Nagara – Desiya Murpokku Dravida Kazhagam (Tamil Nadu)
- Palm (of hand) – Indian National Congress
- Plough – Jammu & Kashmir National Conference (Jammu and Kashmir)
- Rooster – Naga People's Front (Manipur, Nagaland)
- Spade and ashpan rake – Revolutionary Socialist Party (Kerala, West Bengal)
- Spectacles – Indian National Lok Dal (Haryana)
- Rising sun – Dravida Munnetra Kazhagam (Tamil Nadu)
- Sun without rays – Zoram Nationalist Party (Mizoram)
- Table lamp – Sikkim Krantikari Morcha (Sikkim)
- Telephone – Himachal Vikas Congress (Himachal Pradesh)
- Two leaves – All India Anna Dravida Munnetra Kazhagam (Tamil Nadu), Kerala Congress (M) (Kerala)
- Umbrella – Sikkim Democratic Front (Sikkim)
- Water bottle – Rashtriya Loktantrik Party (Rajasthan)
- Weighing scale – Shiromani Akali Dal (Punjab)

=== Iran ===
- Slashed equal sign – Nation Party of Iran, Pan-Iranist Party
- Lion and Sun flag – Iranian opposition, Iranian monarchism

=== Ireland ===
- Starry Plough – Irish Citizen Army, Irish Republican Socialist Party, Irish National Liberation Army, Irish People's Liberation Organisation, Labour Party

=== Israel ===
- Hand with two raised fingers – Lehi (militant group)
- Six-pointed Star and Fist – Kahanism, Kach (political party), Jewish Defense League

=== Italy ===
- Arrowed turtle - CasaPound
- Labrys - Ordine Nuovo, Movimento Politico Ordine Nuovo
- Tricolor Flame (Fiamma Tricolore) - Brothers of Italy, Social Movement Tricolour Flame, The Right – Tricolour Flame, Italian Social Movement
- Wolfsangel - Terza Posizione

=== Japan ===
- Rising Sun Flag - Zaitokukai

=== Lebanon ===
- Cedar tree split into three parts - Kataeb Party, Kataeb Regulatory Forces
- Cross of Resistance (Salib al-Muqawama) - Lebanese Forces (militia)

=== Nepal ===
- Bus – Nepal Federal Socialist Party
- Khukuri – Sanghiya Loktantrik Rastriya Manch
- Madal – Nepal Majdoor Kisan Party
- Plough – Rastriya Prajatantra Party
- Smiley – Bibeksheel Nepali Dal
- Sun – Nepal Communist Party
- Tree – Nepali Congress
- Tumbler – Rastriya Janamorcha
- Umbrella – People's Socialist Party, Nepal
- Weighing scale – Sajha Party

=== The Netherlands ===
- Ancient Greek temple – Forum for Democracy
- Seagull – Party for Freedom
- Tomato – Socialist Party
- Red rose – Labour Party

=== Pakistan ===
- Arrow – Pakistan Peoples Party
- Book – Jamiat Ulema-e-Islam (JUI)
- Cricket bat – Pakistan Tehreek-e-Insaaf
- Kite – Muttahida Qaumi Movement (MQM)
- Lantern - Awami National Party (ANP)
- Sunflower – Green Party of Pakistan
- Tiger – Pakistan Muslim League (N)
- Weighing scale – Jamaat-e-Islami Pakistan (JI)

=== Poland ===
- Falanga symbol - National Radical Camp, Falanga (organisation)
- Toporzeł - Zadruga, Niklot
- Mieczyk Chrobrego - All-Polish Youth, National Party, Camp of Great Poland

=== Russia ===
- Bladed swastika – Russian National Unity
- Chi Rho – Great Russia
- Cross potent – People's National Party, Russian National Union
- Symbol of Chaos – Eurasianism
- Z (military symbol) – Putinism, Ruscism, Russian irredentism

=== Slovakia ===
- Christian cross – Christian Democratic Movement
- Blue cube – Slovak Democratic and Christian Union – Democratic Party
- Flying dove – Free Forum
- Eagle – Slovak National Party
- Red star – Communist Party of Slovakia
- letter S – People's Party – Movement for a Democratic Slovakia
- Stork – Christian Democratic Movement

=== South Africa ===
- Triskele of three sevens – Afrikaner Weerstandsbeweging

=== Sweden ===
- Black sail – Pirate Party
- Cornflower – Liberals (pre-2016)
- Dandelion – Green Party
- Four-leaf clover – Centre Party
- Hepatica – Sweden Democrats
- Jēran – National Youth
- letter L – Liberals
- letter M – Moderate Party
- Tiwaz rune – Nordic Resistance Movement
- Red carnation – Left Party
- Rose – Social Democrats
- Wolfsangel – Vitt Ariskt Motstånd
- Wood anemone – Christian Democrats (pre-2017)

=== Switzerland ===
- Phrygian cap with a Swiss cross – Swiss Party of Labour

=== Taiwan ===
- Blue Sky with a White Sun – Kuomintang

=== Turkey ===
- Bee – Motherland Party
- Dolphin – Liberal Democratic Party
- Dove – Democratic Left Party
- Horse – Democrat Party
- Kayı tribe symbol – Good Party
- Lightbulb – Justice and Development Party
- Six arrows – Republican People's Party
- Three crescents – Nationalist Movement Party
- Wolf – Idealist Hearths

=== Ukraine ===
- At sign – Internet Party of Ukraine
- Hand with three fingers raised – Svoboda (political party)
- Tryzub with sword – OUN-M, Right Sector, Tryzub (organization)
- National Idea (symbol) – Patriot of Ukraine, Azov Civil Corps, Social-National Assembly, Social-National Party of Ukraine, Karelian National Battalion

=== United Kingdom ===
- Bee – Co-operative Party
- Earth with sunflower petals – Green Party of England and Wales
- Flash and circle – British Union of Fascists, British fascism
- Griffin – Libertarian Party
- Liberty bird – Liberal Democrats
- Lion – Democratic Unionist Party, Britain First, UK Independence Party (2017-2018), Young Conservatives (UK)
- Pound sign – UK Independence Party (1993–2017)
- Red Hand of Ulster – Ulster loyalism, Ulster unionism, Ulster nationalism
- Red house – Aspire (political party)
- Red rose – Labour Party
- Red inverted triangle and red wedge – Left-wing politics, and anti-fascism – used by Red Wedge (1980s), Anti-Fascist Action (1980s), Searchlight magazine (current), and occasionally others. Also used by Jewdas (since the 2010s) as part of a Jewish antifascist symbol.
- Thistle - Scottish Labour (since 2022)
- Saltire – the Scottish National Party and Scottish Conservative Party both use stylised saltires in their party logos
- Scribbled oak tree – Conservative Party
- Shovel – Labour Party (UK) until 1983
- Stylised P-shaped Flag – Pirate Party UK
- Sun cross – British Movement
- Sunflower – Scottish Green Party
- Torch – former logo of the Labour Party (1920s to 1983) and the Conservative Party (1980s to 2006).
- Union Flag – used in the logos of the Ulster Unionist Party, Democratic Unionist Party, British National Party, Conservative Party (traditional), amongst others
- Welsh Dragon – former logo of Plaid Cymru; also appeared alongside the thistle, daffodil and clover leaf on the post-war Tory logo
- Welsh poppy – Plaid Cymru
- White Rose – logo of the Yorkshire Party, symbol of Yorkshire as a whole

=== United States ===
- Abraham Lincoln – Republican Party, used on some paper ballots in the US; also used as a fundraising symbol (such as with the party's annual "Lincoln Dinner" in many states).
- Bear – California National Party
- Benjamin Franklin – Democratic Party, used on some paper ballots in the US
- Black and white cockade – Federalist Party
- Camel – Prohibition Party
- Donkey – Democratic Party
- Eagle – Republican Party (used on ballots in New York State); Constitution Party, American Party
- Elephant – Republican Party
- Lady Justice – Justice Party
- Letter L – Silver Legion of America
- Lion – National Party
- Minute Man and Embattled Farmer are the symbols of American Patriot Party (2003 to present)
- Moose – Vermont Progressive Party; also used in 1912 for the Bull Moose Party
- Panther – Black Panther Party
- Pelican – American Solidarity Party. Used for its association with Christian democracy.
- Penguin – used in some states as a symbol of the Libertarian Party
- Porcupine – Libertarian Party. Used as a symbol of the Free State Project in New Hampshire and libertarian ideas and movements in general.
- Raccoon – Whig Party
- Red rose – Democratic Socialists of America
- Red, white and blue cockade – Democratic-Republican Party
- Star – Democratic Party (used on ballots in New York State)
- Statue of Liberty – Libertarian Party. Also a national symbol.
- Sunflower – Green Party; also, Republican presidential candidate Alfred Landon of Kansas in 1936
- Thomas Jefferson and Andrew Jackson – Democratic Party – used as a fundraising symbol (such as with the party's annual "Jefferson-Jackson Dinner" in many states)
- Tiger – formerly, the New York City Democratic Party and the Tammany Hall political machine that controlled it for more than a century and a half.
- Torch – Conservative Party of New York; Libertarian Party
- Wolf – Working Families Party

== Flags ==
- Arab Liberation Flag – Arab nationalism, Nasserism, Arab socialism, Pan-Arabism, Anti-imperialism, Republicanism
- Flag of the Arab Revolt – Pan-Arabism, Arab nationalism
- Black flag – Anarchism, Islamism, Jihadism, Rebellion, Arabo-Jewish Unity
- Black Bauhinia flag – Pro-democracy camp (Hong Kong), Hong Kong nationalism, Hong Kong independence, opposition to Chinese state nationalism
- Black-yellow-white flag – Russian ultranationalism, Russian imperialism, Russian irredentism
- Canadian Duality Flag – Canadian federalism, Quebec autonomism
- Canadian Red Ensign – Canadian Anglophila, Support for the Commonwealth of Nations, Far-right politics in Canada, Canadian nationalism, White nationalism/supremacism in Canada, Alt right movement of Canada
- Calcutta flag – Indian independence movement
- Bisected red-and-black flag – Anarchist communism, Anarcho-syndicalism, Libertarian socialism
- Flag of China – Chinese socialism, Chinese communism, Chinese nationalism, Pro-Beijing camp (Hong Kong)
- Confederate battle flag — Culture of the Southern United States, Historical commemoration of the Civil War, Neo-Confederates, Southern heritage, Lost Cause of the Confederacy, White supremacy, Rebellion
- Doug flag – Cascadia movement
- Estelada – Catalan separatism, Catalan nationalism
- Eureka Flag – Australian nationalism, Republicanism
- Flag of Azawad – Azawad self-determination, Berberism, Tuareg nationalism, Azawad separatism
- Gadsden flag – Right libertarianism, Classical liberalism, Liberty, Libertarian conservativism, Tea Party movement, Individualism, Americanism
- Flag of Ba'athist Iraq – Saddamism, Ba'athism, pro-Iraqi Ba'ath movement
- Flag of Israel – Zionism, Israeli nationalism
- Green flag – Third International Theory, Gaddafi loyalism, Irish nationalism
- Jihadist flag – Islamism, Islamic fundamentalism, Jihadism, Islamic extremism, Shock value
- Morning Star flag – Free Papua Movement, Papuan nationalism
- Flag of Nazi Germany – Nazism, neo-Nazism, White supremacy, Aryanism, Nazi chic, Shock value
- Flag of North Korea – Kimilsungism–Kimjongilism, Pro-DPRK, Juche, Songun, Shock value
- Oranje, Blanje, Blou – Afrikaner ethnonationalism, Support for Apartheid, White supremacy, Anti-Black racism, White separatism
- Pan-African flag – Pan-Africanism, Black nationalism, Black power, Garveyism, pro-UNIA
- Pine Tree Flag – Christian nationalism, American Libertarianism, Christian Patriot movement, Culture of New England, Right-wing libertarianism, Americanism
- Prince's Flag – Dutch patriotism, Greater Netherlands movement, Nostalgia for the Dutch Republic, Pan-Netherlands politics, Far-right politics in the Netherlands.
- Rainbow flag (LGBT) – LGBT pride, LGBT rights, LGBT movements
- Red flag – Socialism, Communism, Marxism, Labour movement, Left-wing politics, Anarchism
- Red and black flag – Anarcho-syndicalism, Anarchist communism, Collectivist anarchism
- Flag of Rhodesia – Rhodesian exile movement, Nostalgia for Rhodesia, White nationalism, White supremacy, Alt-right politics, Rhodesiana.
- Rising Sun Flag – Japanese militarism, Japanese nationalism
- Senyera – Catalan identity, Catalan nationalism
- Flag of South Vietnam – Vietnamese diaspora, Anti-communism, Vietnamese democracy movement, Vietnamese heritage, Vietnamese ethnic unity,
- Flag of the Soviet Union – Communism, Soviet patriotism, Nostalgia for the Soviet Union, Marxism–Leninism, Communist chic, Neo-Sovietism, Support for the Russian invasion of Ukraine, Shock value
- Flag of Ba'athist Syria – Assadism, Neo-Ba'athism, pro-Syrian Ba'ath movement
- Flag of the Ukrainian Insurgent Army – Banderism, Ukrainian nationalism, Opposition to the Russian invasion of Ukraine, Anti-Sovietism, Russophobia
- Flag of the United States – American conservatism, American libertarianism, American nationalism, American exceptionalism, Americanism, Trumpism, Radical right
- White-blue-white flag – Anti-Putinism, opposition to the Russian invasion of Ukraine, Irpin Declaration, Russian opposition
- White-red-white flag – Belarusian democracy movement, Belarusian opposition, opposition to Alexander Lukashenko, Belarusian nationalism, anti-Union State
