= Radical symbol (disambiguation) =

Radical symbol, a symbol for the square root or higher-order root of a number.

Radical symbol may also refer to:

- Chinese character radicals, a visually prominent component of a Chinese character
- List of ideological symbols includes symbols used by political radicals
