= Youth in Brazil =

Brazilian younger generation ranging from 15 to 35 years age

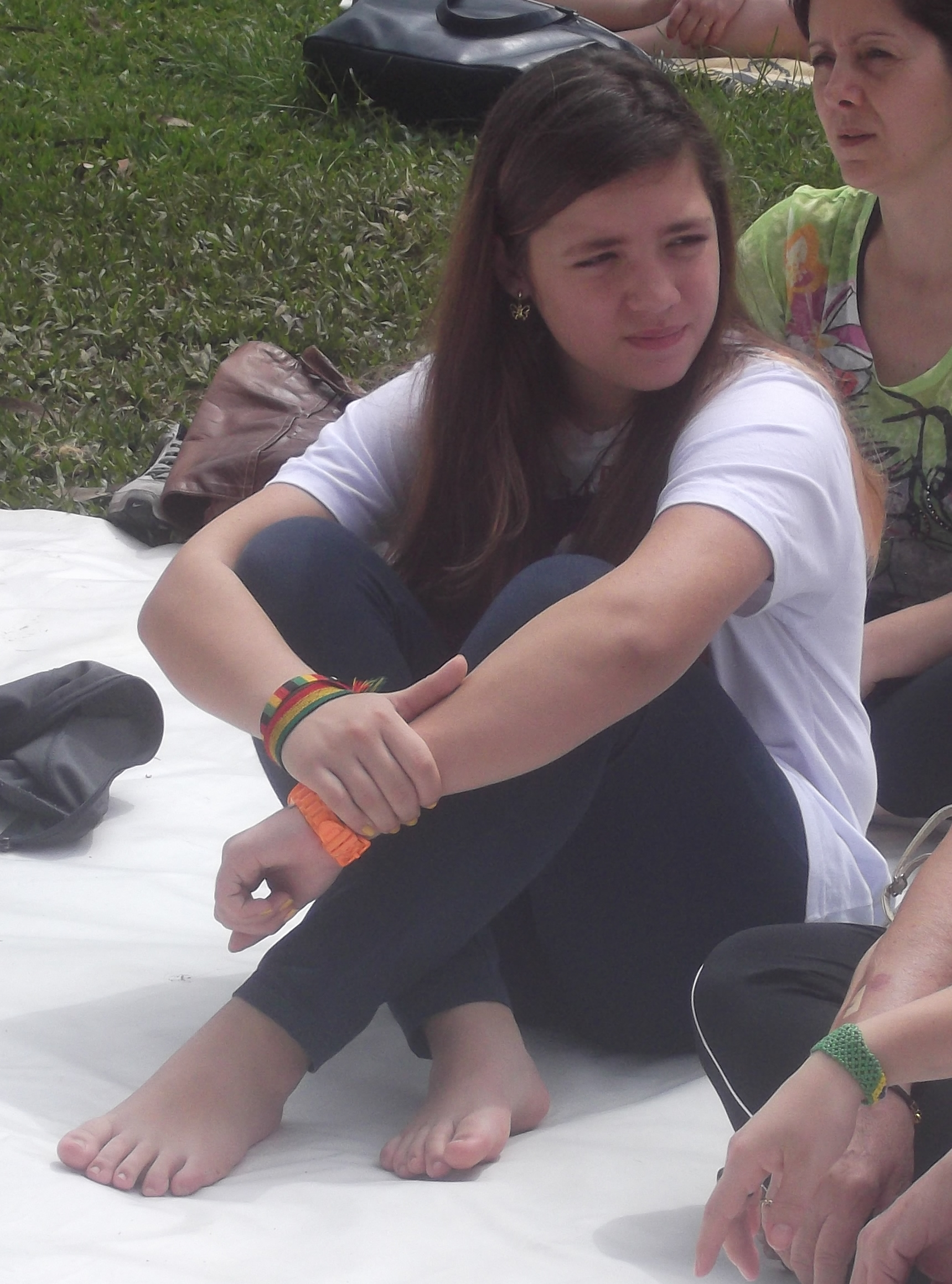
Brazilian Youth in urban city park.

Youth in Brazil includes Brazilians aged 15 to 24 or 33, depending on the definition of youth. Youth account for 16.5% of the population in Brazil which is, 202,656,788 people. There are 16,993,708 male youth and 16,521,057 female youth in Brazil.

The youth population in 2010 was 34.5 percent higher than it was in 1980. However, birthrates among Brazilians are dropping and youth as a percent of total population is decreasing. The fast fertility decline since the 1960s is the largest contributing factor to Brazil's slowing population growth rate, aging population, and fast-paced demographic transition. By 2050 the number of youth is projected to fall again by 33.1 percent in comparison to the 2010 youth population.

== Family and Marriage ==
Today Brazilian youth are living at home longer than before due to a longer time spent in school and trouble finding steady employment. It is not uncommon for youth to live at home or be dependents of their parents until they get married. In general, men live at home with their parents longer than women do. The family has great influence over Brazilian youth. The family provides youth with socialization and allows them to develop and shape their personalities.

The average age for youth to get married is twenty years old. Education is positively correlated with the age of marriage. According to fertility surveys, 30% of women with at least six years of education got married before age 20. The percentage increased to 60% among women who obtained less than six years of education. Youth living in rural areas generally get married sooner than urban youth. In most cases youth engage in sexual activity before marriage. Only one in ten youth use birth control.

== Education ==
Education in Brazil is free and regulated by the national Ministry of Education (MEC), while the funding and administration is derived from the states. The education system consists of three stages: pre-school, fundamental education, and upper secondary education. Pre-school covers ages four and five, fundamental education covers age six through fourteen and upper secondary education is for youth age 15–17.

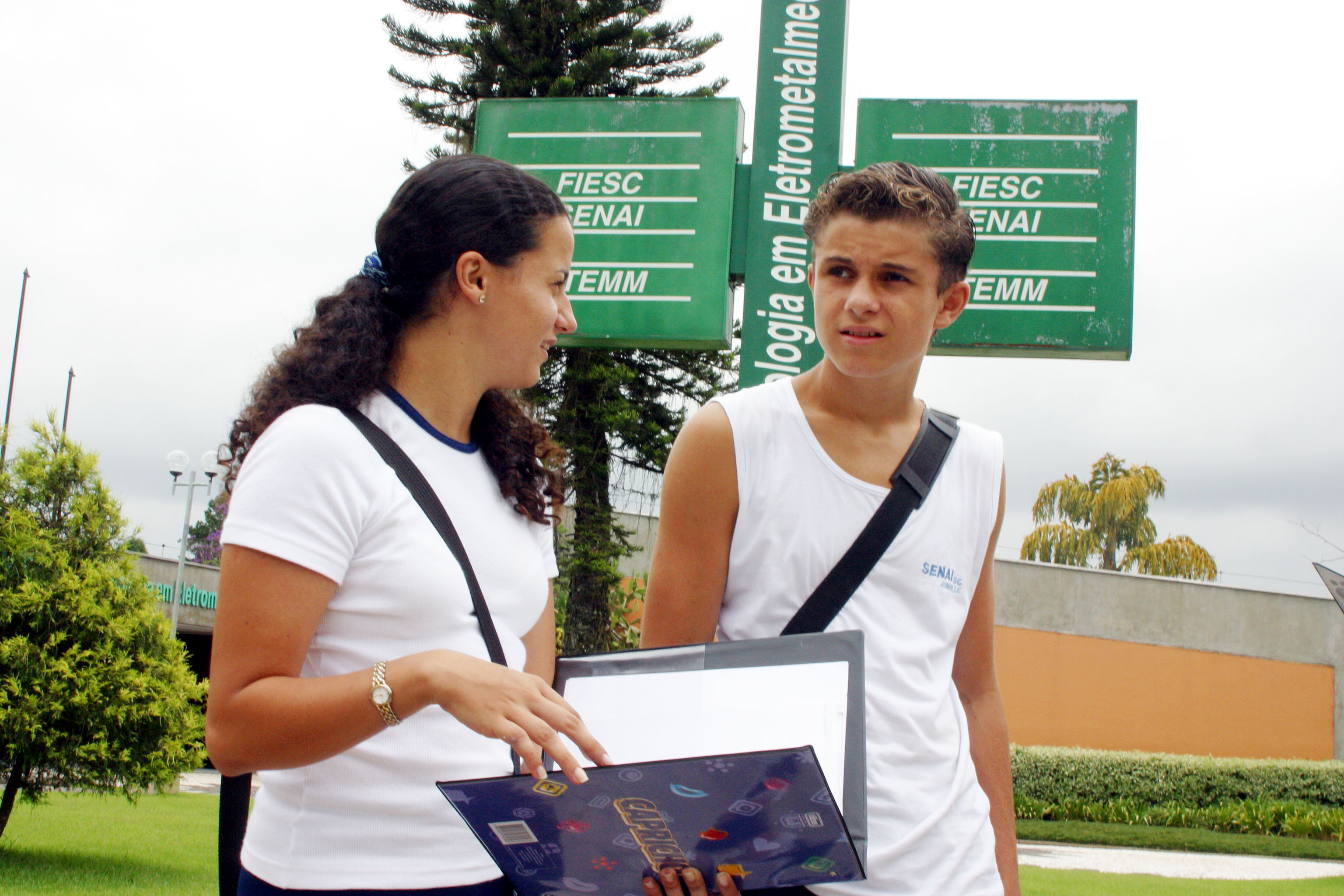
Brazilian students walking through their high school campus.

Participation in secondary education has historically been low in Brazil. However enrollments in early childhood education have increased by 52% between 2000 and 2012. Approximately 98% of 6 to 14 year olds are now enrolled in education and the number of youth who attain upper secondary education has doubled within the past generation.

Brazilian students have one of the highest rates of grade repetition amongst students in counties who participate in the PISA tests. Over eight million Brazilian youth did not finish their fundamental education. Over a third of 20- to 24-year-olds leave school without reaching upper secondary education. This is twice the average rate observed by the OECD. The average literacy rate is approximately 97.5%. The literacy rate among male youth is 96.7% and 98.3% among females. About 8% of the youth population have already left school before age 15. By the age of 18 only 50% of Brazilian youth remain in education. The labor market does not require as high levels of education as other countries.

== Employment ==
Brazilian youth work in sectors such as manufacturing, trade, construction, hotel, and restaurant industries. Since 2000 states have been in charge of setting their own minimum wage. Industrialization and service sectors provide work opportunities in the cities for young people. These jobs often have high turnover rates.

In Brazil a majority of youth do not work out of necessity. Among youth age 18-22 only 27.2% work because they say they have to. Approximately 24.9% work because they want to be independent, while 23.3% work because they consider work to be a personal achievement.

Brazil has instituted policies specifically to help youth make more smooth and successful transitions from school to work. In 2003 the first national program was created to assist young people in obtaining their first job. That program is First Job Stimulus Program (Programa de Estimulo ao Primeiro Emprego). In 2011 the National Agenda on Decent Work for Youth (Agenda Nacional de Trabalho Decente para a Juventude) was created.

=== Unemployment ===
Unemployment rates among youth in Brazil are generally double the rates among adults. As of 2011, there was an approximate 15.4% youth unemployment rate. Specifically, youth males have a 12.2% unemployment rate while females have a 19.8% unemployment rate. Unemployment Insurance (UI) stated in Brazil in 1986 and has existed in its present form since 1994. The insurance covers individuals in the private sector who lose their work through unjustified dismissal, including being laid-off. There are currently no requirements for an unemployed individual to search for work. An estimated 27% of Brazilian unemployment recipients are under the age of 21. This is partially because youth are less likely to be eligible for unemployment insurance.

== Youth Crime ==
UNESCO calculates that there are 54.5 homicides for every 100,000 young men living in cities such as Recife, Brazil. Most homicides occur in poor bairros like Santa Barbara and Vientnã. The highest death rates were among males age 15 to 24. Not all youth crimes in Brazil are violent homicides. Gang activity is common among young people, especially in favelas. In Brazil the favelas are controlled primarily by youth and young adults.

In the Brazilian favelas it is common for children around the age of ten to join a gang. At age twelve they can carry a weapon. This is especially dangerous because, at this stage in a child's life they have not developed the ability to control their actions, especially with weapons. There are also pressures from gangs and drugs influences that increase youth crime and homicide. Criminal gangs use as much violence than necessary to control their business, so they are not disturbed by police.

== Youth Policy ==
Historically, youth policies in Brazil focus primarily on two types of intervention policy. One focus sees youth as asocial threat. The other policy views youth as the subject to rights. However, youth policies are starting to shift away from the 'youth problem approach' of combating violence and controlling youth's free time. There is now a push to ensure their rights.

In 2010, the Constitution of Brazil was amended to specifically include and protect youth. A new chapter in the constitution entitled, "Family, Child, Adolescent, Youth, and Elderly" was created.

On August 5, 2013, Brazil's Parliament approved the creation of the Statute of Youth. The Statute provides guidelines and principles for public youth policy, youth rights, and the legal establishment of a National System of Youth and Youth Councils. The Statute of Youth defines youth as people between age 15 and 29.

The Statute requires that youth have the right to:

- Citizenship, social and political participation, and representation
- An education
- Acquisition of the necessary skills to practice a profession, work, and income
- Non-discrimination and equality
- Health
- Culture
- Communication, media, and freedom of expression
- Sport and leisure
- Mobility
- Enjoyment of a sustainable and ecologically balanced environment
- Public security and access to justice

Public and Private agents engaging in youth, must follow these youth policy guidelines.

== Politics ==
Brazil has a compulsory voting system. Youth gain the right to vote at age 16. Voting is optional for youth age 16 to 18 and people over 70 years old.

In June 2013, a student-led protest movement began in São Paulo, Brazil. The protests began when bus and subway fares were raised 10-cents. The protests was led by the Free Fare Movement (Movimento Passe Livre). As the youth protests went on, the movement grew to address other issues, including excessive amounts of money being used for the World Cup, government corruption, and social inequalities. The youth also stood up to police brutality against their fellow protesters. The goals of the movement included improvement of public transportation, national health care, and the public education system.
