= 2013 protests in Brazil =

Public transport and societal protests in Brazil

2013 Brazilian protests
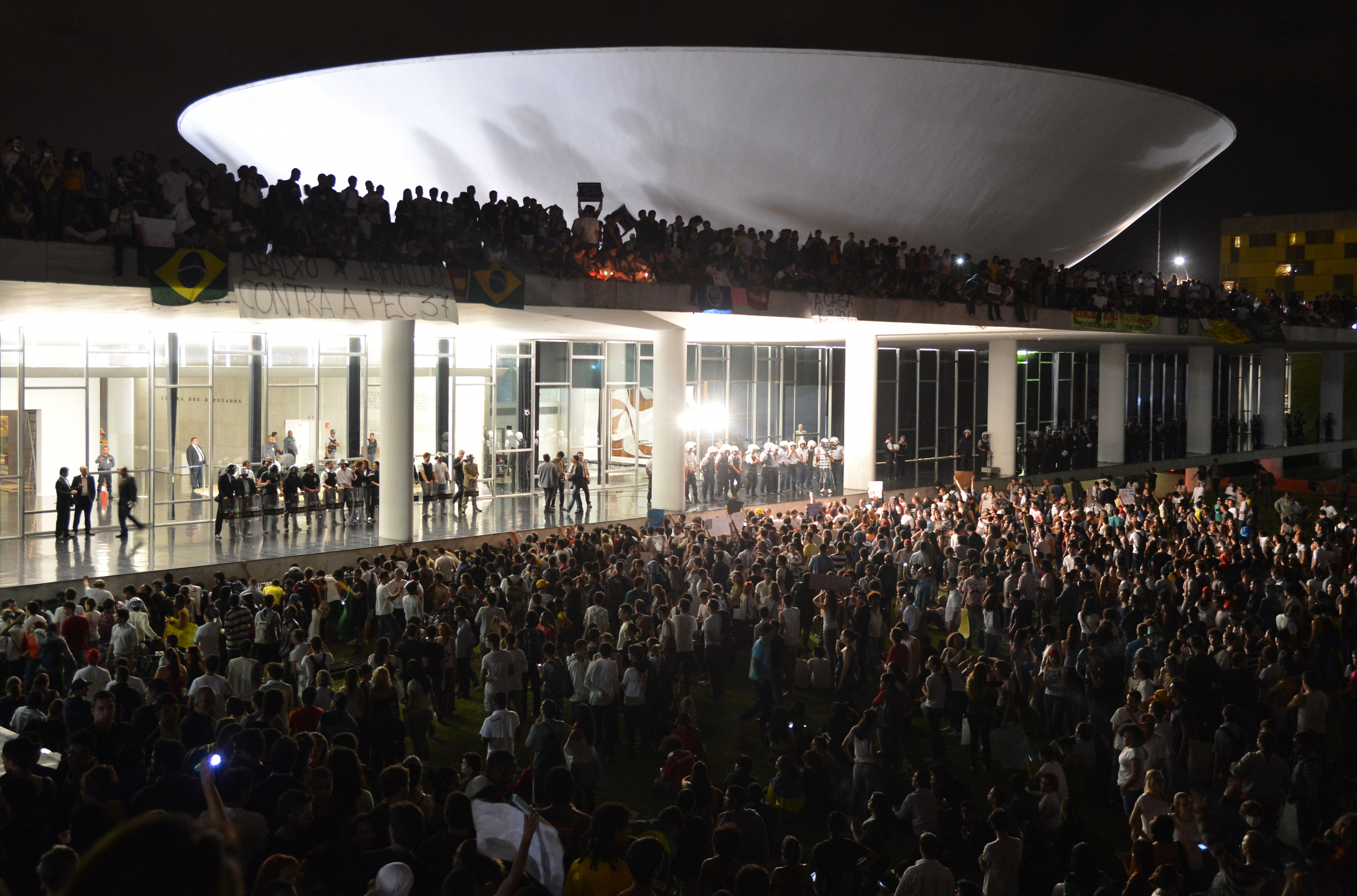
- Protesters at the National Congress of Brazil, in Brasília, 17 June
- Date: May - June 2013 (minor protests) (Note: Smaller public demonstrations known as the Bus Rebellion also occurred on some major cities from August to September 2012 and in March 2013.); June 13 – July 2013 (major protests) (Note: Smaller demonstrations also spread through many cities on 7 September 2013, the Independence Day in Brazil.)
- Location: * Over 500 Brazilian cities and at least 27 cities with Brazilian diasporas around the globe
- Caused by: Bus and Metro Fare hikes; Police brutality; Low quality and insufficient public transport; Bad quality of public services (eg: healthcare, education, etc); High cost of living; Increasing government funding of major sports events; Rising anti-establishment feeling; Corruption; Controversial law in discussion by National Chamber's plans limiting the powers of the Public Ministry to investigate criminal activities, among other reasons; High taxes
- Goals: Improvements in public transport's quality and access to the population (subdued 24 June); Less public transport cost for the population (subdued 24 June); Increase of government effort and funds to improve other key public services including public education, national health care and transport infrastructure altogether (subdued 24 June); Less priority to fund major sports events (subdued 24 June); Revocation of controversial law in discussion by National Chamber's plans limiting the powers of the Public Ministry to investigate criminal activities in the government (subdued 25 June); "Zero tariffs"; End to police brutality; Democratization of the media
- Methods: Occupations of public and private buildings, Autodefense of masses and Black Block, Demonstrations, protest marches, online activism and alternative media, Direct action, Graffiti, banners and signs, Barricades, attacks to government power and capitalist symbols, Destruction and firebombing of buses.
- Status: Major protests subsided
- Result: Stop to unpopular laws such as the increase of public transport tariffs and the "Gay Cure"; approval of a law that guaranteed the royalties of oil to education and healthcare.

Number
| Over 2 million By state: 300,000 in Rio de Janeiro; 100,000 in São Paulo; 100,000 in Manaus; 100,000 in Belo Horizonte; 100,000 in Vitória; 60,000 in Natal; 50,000 in Recife; 45,000 in Florianópolis; 40,000 in Cuiabá; 30,000 in Brasília; 30,000 in Campo Grande; 25,000 in Ribeirão Preto; 20,000 in Salvador; 20,000 in Porto Alegre; 20,000 in Belém; 20,000 in São Luís; 20,000 in Maceió; 15.000 in Fortaleza | |

Casualties
- Deaths: 13+
- Injuries: 100
- Arrested: 250

The 2013 Brazilian protests (Note: Also called the Brazilian Autumn, the Brazilian Spring and the June Journeys by national and foreign media.) were public demonstrations in several Brazilian cities, initiated mainly by the Movimento Passe Livre (Free Fare Movement), a local entity that advocates for free public transportation.

The demonstrations were initially organized to protest against increases in bus, train, and metro ticket prices in some Brazilian cities, but grew to include other issues such as the high corruption in the government and police brutality used against some demonstrators. By mid-June, the movement had grown to become Brazil's largest since the 1992 protests against former President Fernando Collor de Mello.

As with the 2013 Gezi Park protests in Turkey, social media has played an important role in the organization of public outcries and in keeping protesters in touch with one another.

== Name ==
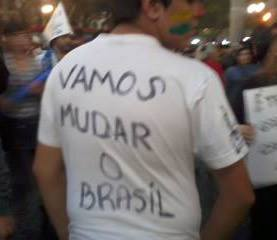
A demonstrator protests in Sé Square, São Paulo. The message says "Let's change Brazil".

Urban riots in Brazil have been traditionally been referred to as the 'Revolt of [Something]'. An example of this was Rio de Janeiro's Revolta da Vacina in the early 20th century. These particular protests have been referred to as the Revolta da Salada ([ʁɛˈvɔwtɐ da saˈladɐ]), Revolta do Vinagre ([ʁɛˈvɔwtɐ du viˈnagɾi]) or Movimento V de Vinagre ([moviˈmẽtu ˈve dʒi viˈnagɾi]) after more than 60 protesters were arrested in June 2013 for carrying vinegar as a home remedy against the tear gas and pepper spray used by police.

Piero Locatelli, a journalist for the CartaCapital magazine, was arrested and taken to the Civil Police after being found with a bottle of vinegar. The sarcastic tone dubbing the protests Marcha do Vinagre i.e. "the vinegar march", was a reference to the popularity of an earlier grassroots march for legalizing marijuana named Marcha da Maconha (the Brazilian version of the Global Marijuana March).

Another popular name for the protests is Outono Brasileiro ("Brazilian Autumn", in a playful reference to the events of the Arab Spring). Primavera (meaning "Spring") is also being used by media.

The alternative name "June Journeys" (Jornadas de Junho), used by some sources and adapted from the France use of journées (days) in the sense of an important event, traces a revolutionary pedigree going back to the June Days Uprising, the June 1848 French workers' uprising in the wake of the 1848 Revolution in France.

== Background ==
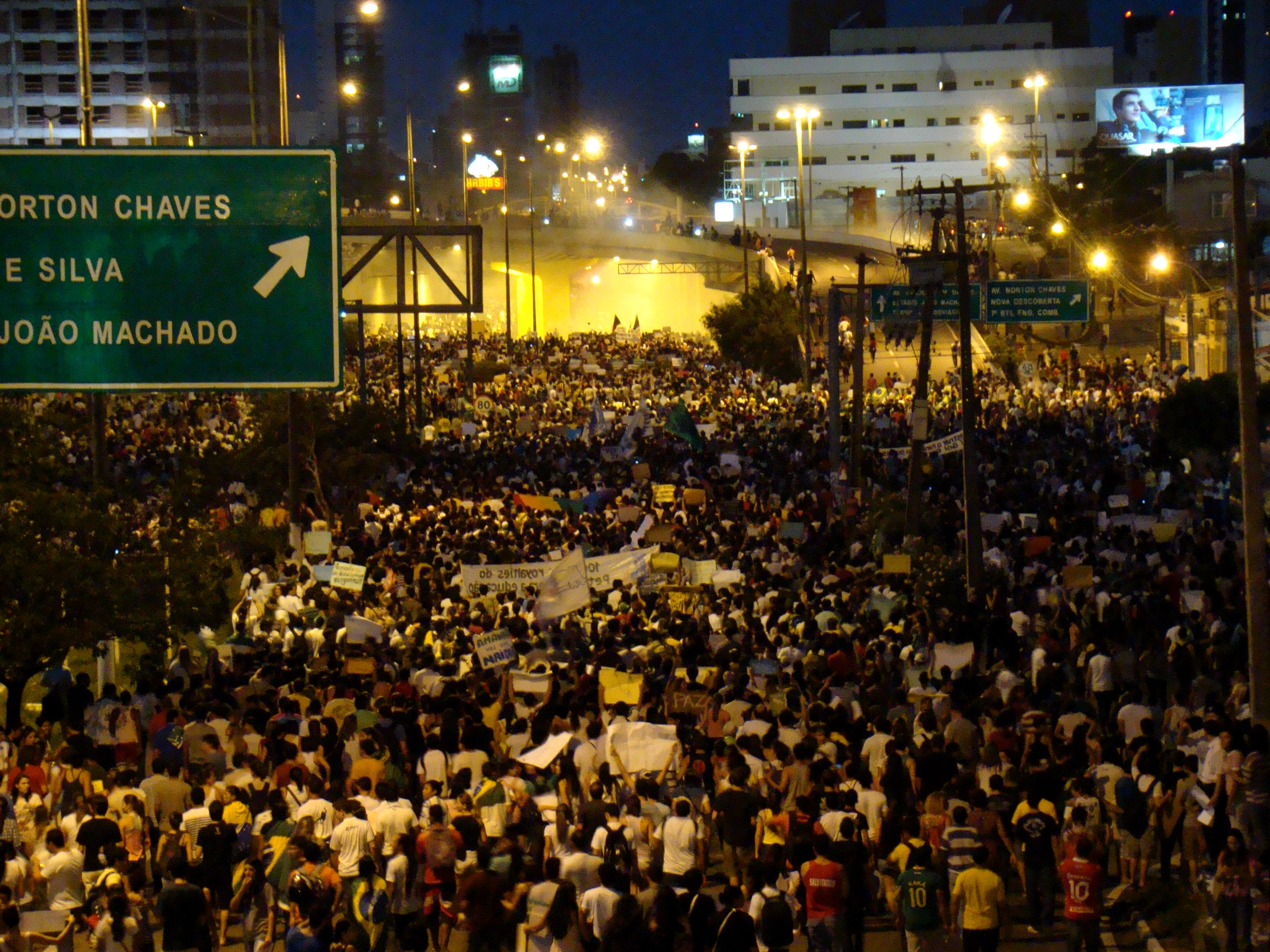
Protesters in Natal

The first demonstrations took place in Natal, Rio Grande do Norte, during August–September 2012 and were informally called Revolta do Busão or Bus Rebellion. Over the course of these protests, demonstrators convinced their municipal authority to reduce the fare price. Similar protests were carried out in Porto Alegre in March 2013, where protesters tried to convince the local city hall to further reduce the fare price, after it had been reduced by a judicial decision.

In Goiânia, demonstrations started on 16 May, before the prices were officially raised on 22 May from R$2.70 to R$3.00. The peak of those demonstrations was on 28 May, at Bíblia Square, when four buses were destroyed; two were incinerated and two were stoned. 24 students were arrested for vandalism and disobedience. Another demonstration took place on 6 June, when students closed streets in downtown Goiânia, set fire to car tires, threw homemade bombs, and broke windows of police cars. On 13 June, the fares were brought back to their previous price when judge Fernando de Mello Xavier issued a preliminary injunction arguing that local bus companies were exempted from paying some taxes as of 1 June, but the passengers were not benefiting from this exemption.

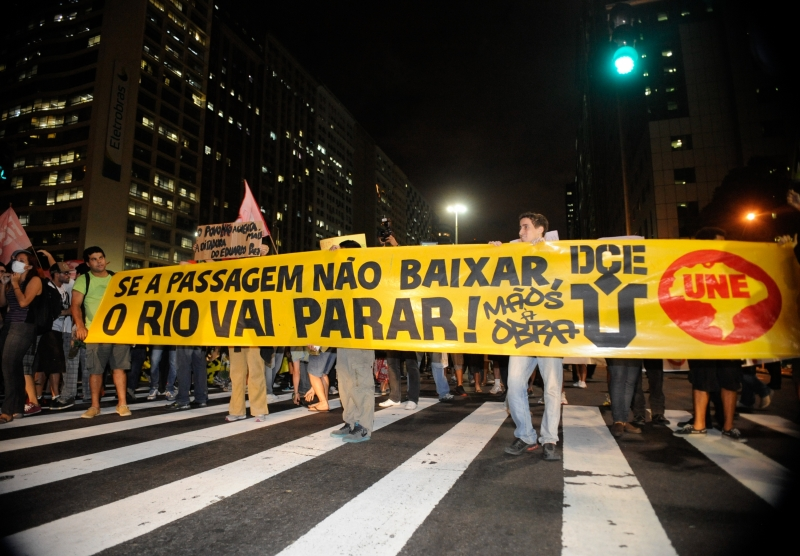
People protesting in the streets of Rio de Janeiro. The sign reads "Se a passagem não baixar, o Rio vai parar!", which translates to "If the fare doesn't drop, Rio is going to stop!"

In São Paulo, demonstrations started when the municipal government and the government of the State of São Paulo, which runs the train and metro system of São Paulo, announced the rise of ticket prices from R$3.00 to R$3.20. The previous hike of bus fares occurred in January 2011, and was also subject of demonstrations. Train and metro fares had been raised to the same price in February 2012. In early 2013, immediately after his election, Mayor Fernando Haddad announced that fares would increase in early 2013. In May, the federal government announced that public transportation would be exempted from paying PIS and COFINS, two taxes of Brazil, so that the increase of public transportation costs would not contribute to ongoing inflation. Even so, the fares were raised from R$3.00 to R$3.20, starting on 2 June, sparking demonstrations.

=== Demands of protesters ===
Although the bus fare increase was the tipping point for demonstrators, the basis for public disenchantment with the policies of the ruling class went far deeper. There was frustration among the general population's disappointment with the inadequate provision of social services in Brazil. Despite Brazil's international recognition in lifting 40 million out of poverty, and into the nova Classe C with comfortable access to a middle class consumer market, the policies have been the subject of intense political debate. Groups among the protestors argues that "Bolsa Familia" and other social policies were simply an electoral strategy from the Worker's Party aimed at "alming the poor". Political opponents took issue with neoliberal or post-neoliberal traitor of its original Marxist precepts that benefits mostly the old, corrupt and stereotypical elites with black money and shady methods, and only making the life of the traditional, more conservative, middle middle and upper middle classes (that are rejected as a sign of reactionary decadence by left-wing elements, and dominant among the mostly urban, young, white, and educated protesters) even harder while political scandals involving the public money most expensive to this conservative middle class run rampant.

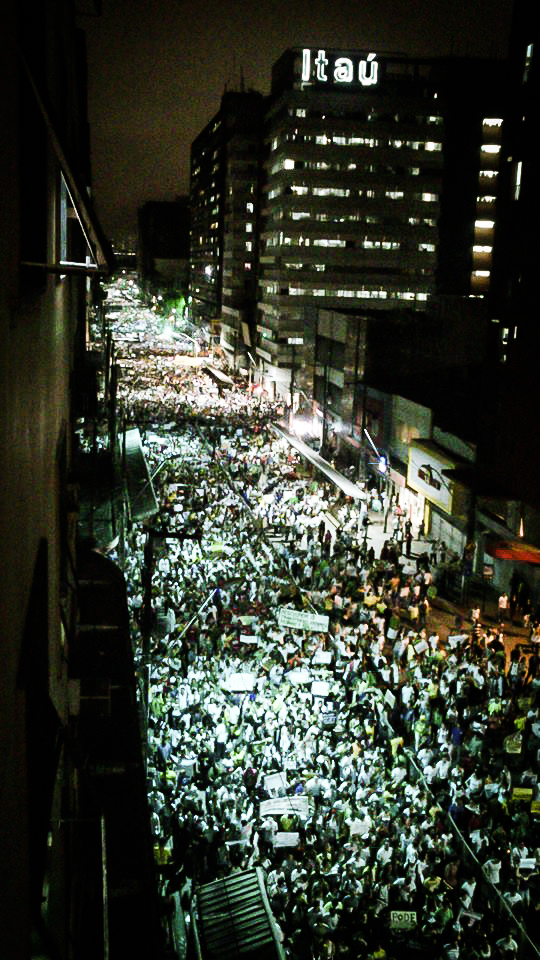
Protesters in Recife.

Meanwhile, mega sports projects such as the 2013 FIFA Confederations Cup and the 2014 FIFA World Cup (to which at that time Brazil had already spent over 7 billion reais and with total expected cost of over 32 billion reais, equivalent to three times South Africa's total in 2010, despite only half the stadiums being finished), as well as the 2016 Summer Olympics, have turned out to be over-budget, and have resulted in a series of revelations about gross overbillings and multibillion-dollar financial scandals. The occurrence of these protests simultaneously with Confederations Cup matches, with sounds of police weapons being audible during the Uruguay vs. Nigeria match on Thursday 20 June, have raised serious questions amongst other sporting nations about the capability of Brazil to host the main event in a year's time, based upon its ostensibly severe social problems. Other points of discontent are the high inflation rates and increases in the prices of basic consumer goods, including food, that, as many other things in Brazil, are heavily taxed (at 27%).

Other commonly stated reasons for the malaise include high taxes that do not benefit the poor. The average Brazilian citizen is estimated to pay 40.5% of their income in taxes, yet the country still suffers from various social and infrastructural problems such as poorly functioning health services, a low education rate, inadequate welfare benefits, and a growing but still low rate of employment.

Situation of party seats in the Brazilian Chamber of Deputies in May 2013. The PT-PMDB coalition government enjoyed a large majority of support (81.6% of the seats), paralleled with high positive popularity ratings (around 80%). After the protests, the margins of support for the government both in the Congress and with the population dropped sharply, and did not rise again

There is also a feeling of powerlessness due to widespread cases of corruption and embezzlement as well as a lack of transparency and financial accountability. Indicted leaders and politicians often stay in power despite being cited for corruption and collusion in the growing overbilling scandals. The protesters particularly object to a constitutional amendment currently being drafted known as PEC 37 that is seen as a cover-up for corrupt politicians and an attempt to reduce the power of the judiciary in pursuing cases. Though not a main cause for the demonstrations, some protestors also object to socially conservative legislation by the religious benches that is seen as a retrocess to Brazil's LGBT and women's rights, a threat to the state of Brazilian secularism, and even freedom of expression.

== Timeline ==
=== 1 to 14 June ===
In June 2013, a series of protests in the Brazilian city of São Paulo were organized against bus and metro fare hikes announced by the city mayor Fernando Haddad in January 2013, who stated that the fares would rise from R$ 3.00 to R$3.20, coming into effect on 1 June.

The first large protest was held on 6 June on Paulista Avenue. In ensuing protests, news reports changed the discourse, mentioning that police had "lost control" on 13 June, because they began using rubber bullets not only against protesters but also journalists that were covering the events. Numerous civil rights groups have criticized the harsh police response, including Amnesty International and the Associação Nacional de Jornais.

=== 17 to 18 June ===
An estimated 250,000 protesters took to the streets of various cities on 17 June. The largest protests were organized in Rio de Janeiro, where 100,000 attended from mid-afternoon of 17 June to late dawn of 18 June.

Although mostly peaceful, the protests escalated with the invasion of the Rio de Janeiro State's Legislative Chamber, causing riot police to be called in. Three protesters were injured by gunfire, reportedly by police forces, while ten others were hospitalized.

State government authorities did not intervene, saying this was an issue for the Military Police. Other protests erupted in support of those being detained by police. Demonstrations were held in a number of cities. The ones held in Curitiba were reported attended by over 10,000 people.

Minor protests staged by Brazilians living abroad were held in several countries including Argentina, Australia, Canada, Germany, Ireland, Italy, Portugal, Spain, the United Kingdom and the United States.

=== 19 June ===
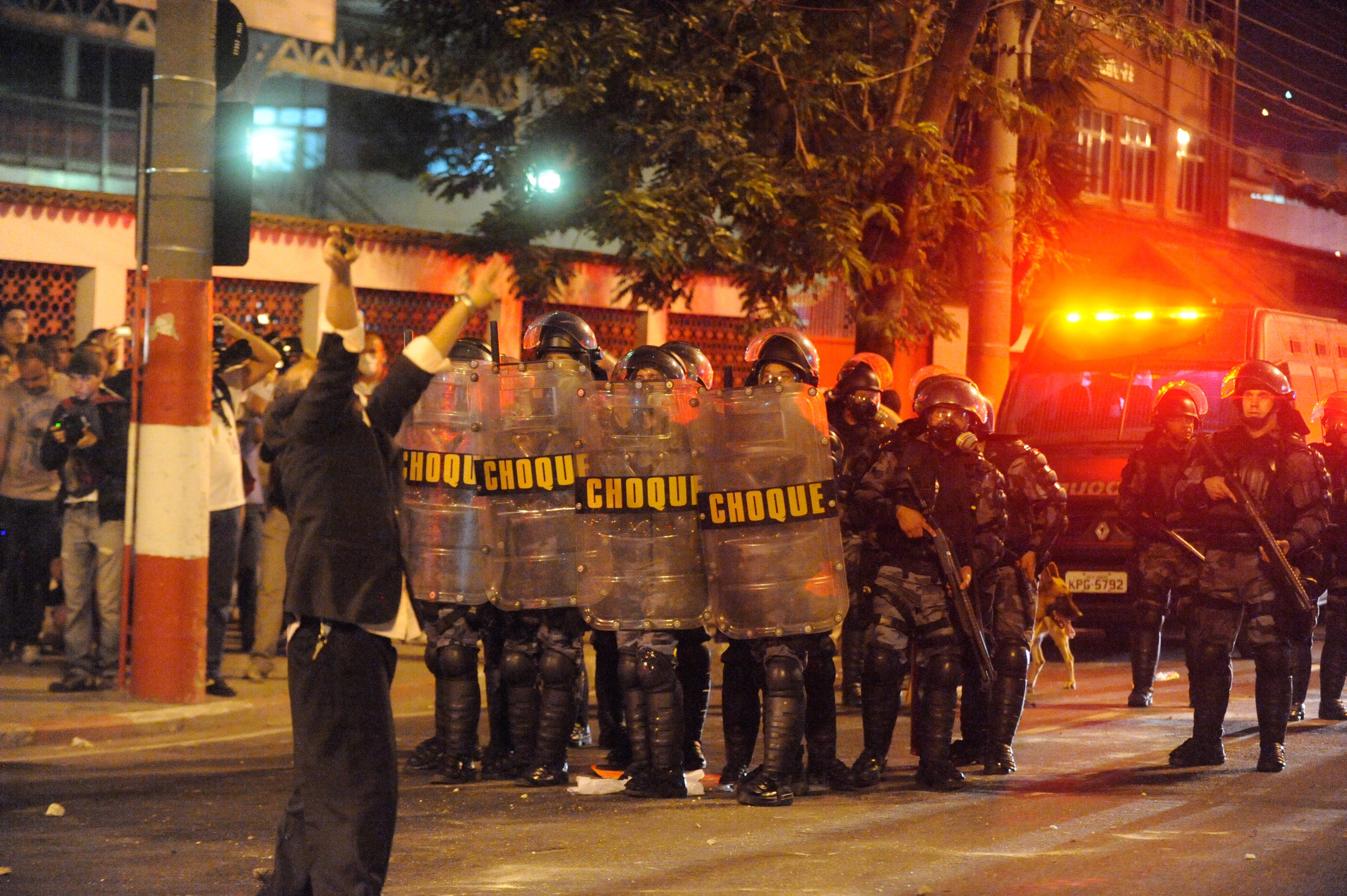
Riot police control PMERJ in Niterói.

Protests continued on a smaller scale. Mayors of several Brazilian cities announced reduction of bus fares or cancellation of previously announced increases, including Rio de Janeiro and São Paulo, where the largest protests had occurred.

=== 20 June ===
Protests in over 100 cities around the country rallied over 2 million people. Special measures were taken to protect main government buildings on major cities like the federal capital Brasília, Rio de Janeiro, São Paulo, Manaus, Belém, Recife, Florianópolis, Belo Horizonte, Goiânia, Curitiba and Porto Alegre, among others. Rafael Braga was arrested, who later received the only conviction of charges related to the 2013 protests in Brazil.

=== 21 to 23 June ===
President Dilma Rousseff during the national pronouncement to the Brazilian people on television.

Protests across Brazil have drawn millions to the streets in a wave of rolling fury that became the biggest demonstrations in decades. A young man was killed in Ribeirão Preto during the protest when a driver ploughed through a peaceful demonstration, also injuring 11 other people. President Dilma Rousseff addressed the nation, recognizing the demands of the protesters and calling a meeting of state governors and mayors of key cities to discuss the requests of the population and propose solutions to solve the issues.

=== 24 June ===
As protests continue on a smaller scale, President Dilma Rousseff along the 27 state governors and the mayors of the 26 state capitals, among other authorities, agree to take measures related to improve funds management, public transport, health care and education. Also announced is a proposal for congress to approve a referendum on widespread political reform.

=== 25 June ===
Almost all members of National Chamber reject controversial law limiting the powers of the Public Ministry to investigate criminal activities in the government, thus accomplishing one of the demands of the protests. President Dilma Rousseff announces that plans for a special constituent assembly on political reform were abandoned, but there are still plans to submit the constitutional amendments in discussion to popular vote.

=== 26 June ===
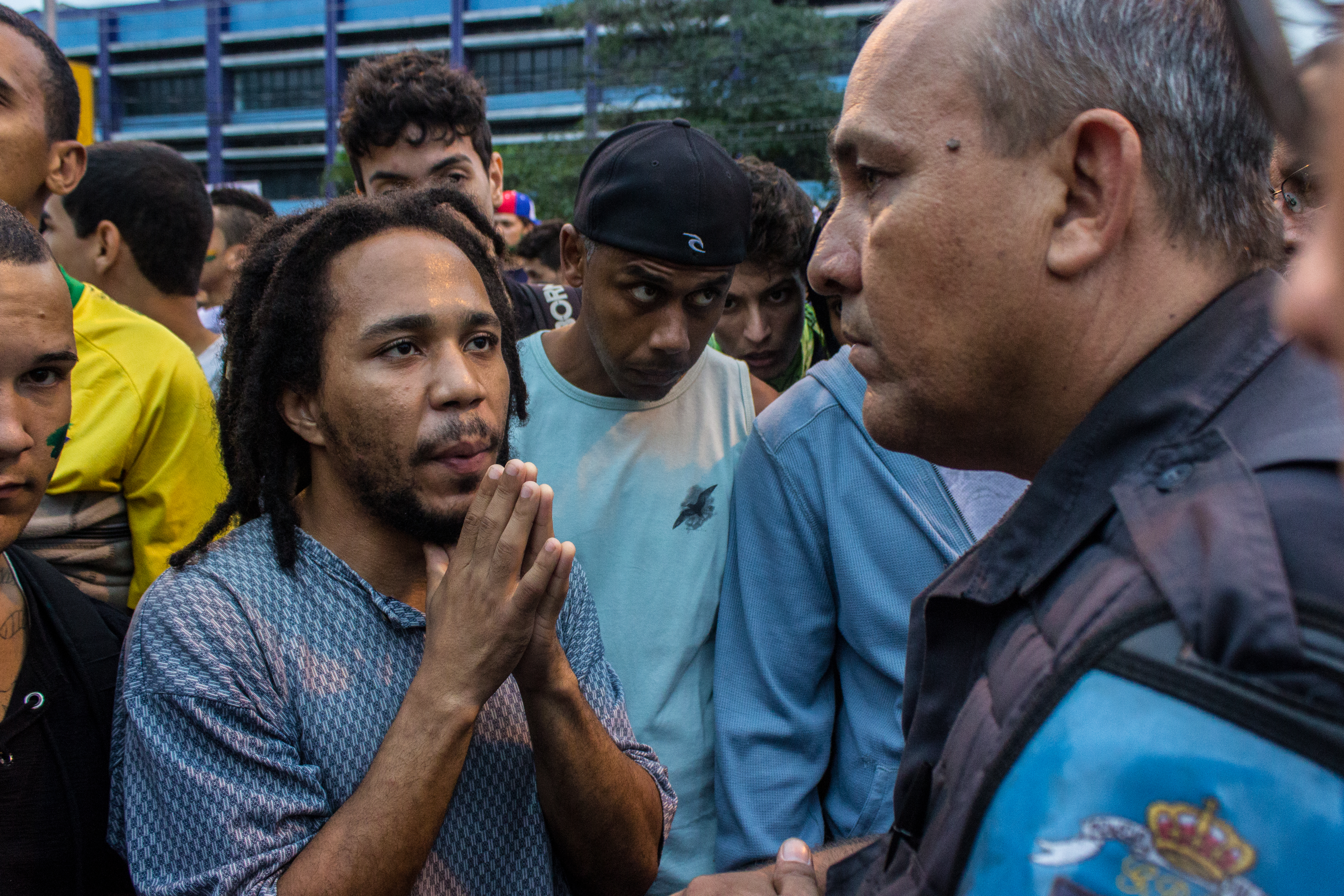
Protester pleads for understanding of the Military Police of Rio de Janeiro State

Almost all members of National Chamber approved the destination of petroleum royalties to education (75%) and health (25%). The congress also approved the end of secret vote for forfeiture of office and the recognition of all forms of corruption and embezzlement as heinous crimes; and the end of all Taxes regarding Public transport, including metro, train, bus and ship. A large protest of 120.000 people is held in Belo Horizonte where the 2013 Confederations Cup semi-final match between Brazil and Uruguay was occurring, and ran with no incidents until small riots began. A young man died after falling from a viaduct.

=== 30 June ===
Protesters in Brazil clashed with police during the Confederations Cup final match between the host nation and Spain in Rio de Janeiro. Earlier that day, a group of demonstrators tried to storm a Brazilian Football Confederation (CBF) building in Rio. Police kept them back and the group settled outside the building. In a separate protest, several thousand people marched on the Maracanã stadium banging drums.

The protesters demanded free public transport, carrying placards reading "FIFA - you pay the bill". The demonstrators also called for an end to corruption and the resignation of the Rio State governor.

=== 2 July ===
The "Gay cure" Bill, PDL 234, which would have authorized psychologists to treat LGBT people was voted down by the National Congress. In 1830, eight years after the end of Portuguese colonial rule, sodomy laws were eliminated from the new Penal Code of Brazil. Since 1985 the Federal Council of Medicine of Brazil has not considered homosexuality as deviant. In 1999, the Federal Council of Psychology published a resolution that has standardized the conduct of psychologists to face this norm: "...[regulated] psychologists should not collaborate with events or services proposing treatment and cure of homosexuality." In 1990, five years after Brazil removed homosexuality from its list of mental illnesses, the General Assembly of the World Health Organization (WHO), with headquarters in Geneva, Switzerland, removed homosexuality from the International Classification of Diseases (ICD).

PDL 234 dealt only with lesbian, gay, and bisexual persons, as Brazil still pathologizes transgender people. Doctors do not allow hormone therapy for transgender people before age 16, allow gender reassignment surgery for those who have "normal or healthy" genital conditions other than third party-confirmed trans people above the age of 18, and does not ban sexual assignment surgery for intersex newborns and young children. Doctors with parental consent may alter a child's ambiguous genitals without his/her consent and much before gender behavioral characteristics and/or identification would naturally appear.

=== 5 July ===
In Seattle Justin Jasper, an armed local was arrested for planning action in support of Brazil protesters.

=== Later demonstrations ===
Although smaller than the June demonstrations, another wave of protests occurred in many cities around Brazil on 7 September. Protesters organized to challenge military parades that were celebrating Brazil's 1822 independence from Portugal. There were also demonstrations to question government spending on World Cup stadiums and government corruption.

== Responses ==
Following a pledge by President Dilma Rousseff to spend 50 billion Brazilian reais on improving urban public transportation after a meeting with protest leaders June 24, the Brazilian real fell on concern of a widening deficit. This followed a nearly 10 percent fall in the currency in the second quarter of 2013, the worst amongst 16 major currencies.

Demands and result (National Congress and Governments actions)
| Demand | Result |
|---|---|
| Reduction in the prices of public transport (Metro, Train and Bus) (Governments approved) | Yes (June 2013) |
| Revocation of (Bill - PEC 37) that hindered the Public Ministry to investigate (Congress approved) | Yes (June 2013) |
| Destination of petroleum royalties to education (75%) and Health (25%) (Congress approved) | Yes (June 2013) |
| Criminalization of all forms of corruption and embezzlement as heinous crimes (Congress approved) | Pending |
| The end of Secret vote in Congress for forfeiture of office (Congress approved) | Pending |
| The end of all taxes on public transport (metro, train, bus and ship) (Congress approved) | Yes (June 2013) |
| National Pact to improve education, health, public transport (Government established) | Yes (June 2013) |
| National Pact for fiscal responsibility and control of inflation (Government established) | Yes (June 2013) |
| Implementation of federal plebiscite to political reform in the country (Government established) | Pending |
| Revocation of (Bill - PDL 234) "Gay cure" authorizing sexual orientation conversion therapy by psychologists (Congress approved) | Yes (July 2013) |
| Destination of 10% of the Brazilian GDP to education (Congress announced) | Pending |
| Implementation of Free pass to the students enrolled regularly (Congress announced) | Pending |
| Revocation of (Bill - PEC 33) undergoing decisions of Supreme Court to Congress (No discussion) | Pending |
| The end of privileged forum (No discussion) | Pending |
| *Note: Yes is the victory of the protesters. | |

== International reactions ==
=== State ===
- Turkish Prime Minister Recep Tayyip Erdoğan linked the protests with similar protests in Turkey, claiming that they were part of a conspiracy by unspecified foreign forces, bankers, and international and local media outlets. He said that "the same game is now being played over Brazil. The symbols are the same, the posters are the same, Twitter, Facebook are the same, the international media is the same. They are being led from the same center. They are doing their best to achieve in Brazil what they could not achieve in Turkey." He further stated that the two protests were "the same game, the same trap, the same aim."

== See also ==
- List of protests in the 21st century
- 2000 Costa Rican Revolution
- 2021 Brazilian protests
- List of scandals in Brazil
