= Brazilian Integralist Front =

Brazilian Integralist Front Frente Integralista Brasileira
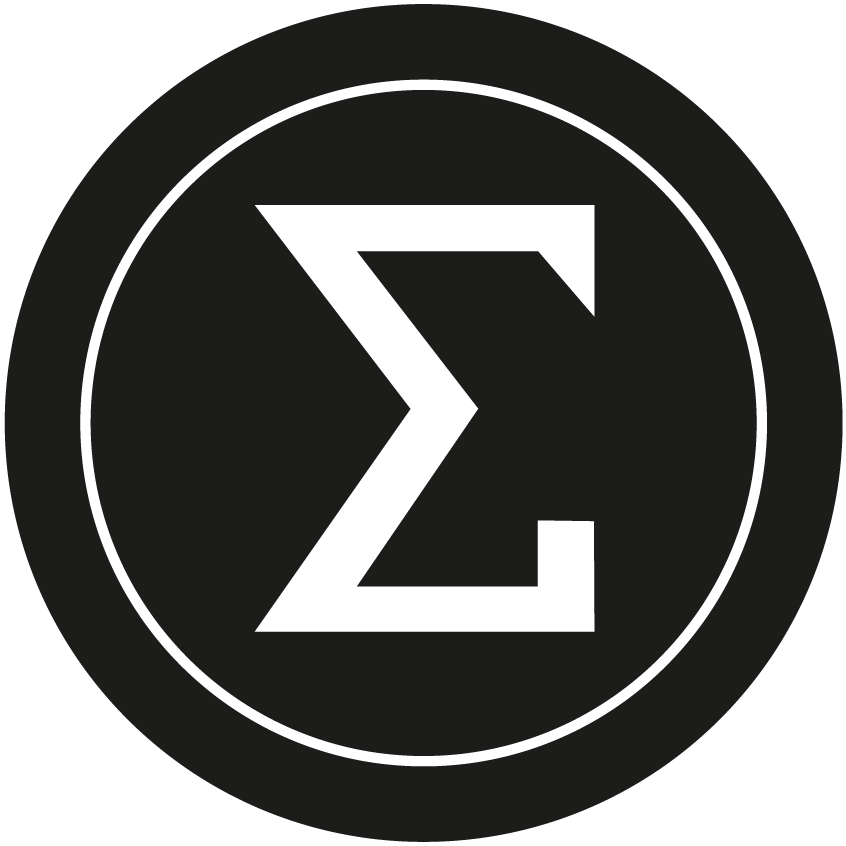
- President: Moisés Lima
- Founded: January 22, 2005; 21 years ago
- Ideology: Brazilian Integralism; Brazilian nationalism; Fascism; National conservatism; Social conservatism; Anti-communism; Anti-capitalism; Anti-liberalism; Antisemitism
- Political position: Far-right

The Brazilian Integralist Front (Portuguese: Frente Integralista Brasileira) is a Brazilian political movement with a fascist inspiration and an anti-liberal, anti-communist, traditionalist and far-right nationalist character. It appeared in 2004, in the so-called Integralist Congress for the 21st century, held in the city of São Paulo, but it was officially founded on January 22, 2005.

== Origins ==
After the death of Plínio Salgado, in 1975, new integralist associations appeared responsible for trying to disseminate the political and literary work of the Integralist leader, such as the Centro Cultural Plínio Salgado, in São Gonçalo (Rio de Janeiro).

During the 1980s, in the context of redemocratization in the country, there was again an attempt to refound the Brazilian Integralist Action (AIB), by veterans of the first, second and third generation of integralists. This attempt resulted in the founding of the Integralist Action Party (PAI), however, due to internal differences, the caption did not flourish as its supporters expected.

In the 1990s and 2000s new associations emerged, among them the Center for Historical and Political Studies (CEHP), located in Santos, the Integralist Nucleus of Rio de Janeiro (NIRJ) and the Youth Nativist of Niterói (JNN), who assisted the work of remaining organizations from the 1980s, such as the Casa de Plínio Salgado and the Centro Cultural Plínio Salgado, the latter then commanded by the ex-militant of the Brazilian Integralist Action, Arcy Lopes Estrella. These last two organizations expanded their area of activity, articulating and grouping different organizations that had integralist doctrine in common.

== History ==
Created by young people belonging to the so-called fourth generation integralist and historical activists of the movement, the FIB emerges as a result of the union of different existing integralist associations, which until then were autonomous. The leaders of these associations organized the so-called 1st Integralist Congress for the 21st Century, which was held on December 4 and 5, 2004, in the city of São Paulo. On that occasion, the Brazilian Integralist Movement (MIB) was founded, whose name would later be changed to the Brazilian Integralist Front. According to the organization's website, the FIB was officially founded the following month, on January 22, 2005.

== Ideology ==
The ideology defended by the organization has been described by academics as chauvinist. Brazilian integralism does not accept neoliberal capitalism or communism. It defends private property, the rescue of national culture, moralism, values nationalism, Christian moral values and Brazilian Christian traditions, the principle of authority (and therefore the hierarchical structure of society), the fight against both communism and economic liberalism, and the defense of municipalism. At this point, the FIB is seen as radical in the defense of the principles that guided the old IBA, keeping the original ideology intact.

Integralists claim to reject liberal democracy as an instrument of political and economic support for capitalism by identifying that this structure reduces all political activity to a mere electoral formalism that is repeated periodically and is exercised only by political parties. In opposition to this, the integralists claim to defend democracy in a broader and more participative character through the conception of organic democracy, whose political participation is not restricted only to political parties, also giving voice to the so-called natural groups. Taking François Furet's analysis of totalitarian movements in the twentieth century into perspective, this allows for a distinction between integralism and fascist and communist movements, which aim to suppress liberal democracy by a totalitarian structure.

== Organization ==
The FIB is organized into state (often treated as provincial) and municipal centers, whose objective is to carry out social actions, studies and advertising. According to researcher Jefferson Rodrigues Barbosa: "the FIB is organized in approximately twenty states of the federation, with more than thirty centers spread across Brazil". These nuclei are geographically subdivided and their activities are guided by five Regional Coordinators: North, Northeast, Midwest, Southeast and South.

== Performance ==
The integralistas work in the most diverse channels, disseminating pamphlets, newsletters, acting in demonstrations, in political parties, academic circles and even maintaining contact with similar organizations at national and international level, as is the case of the Italian organization Forza Nuova.

=== Internet ===
As the internet is the fastest means of communication, integralists today use it as a means of disseminating ideals, seeking to propagate their ideology and attracting new followers. In view of these considerations, it can be considered that a large portion of the new militants know and come into contact with the movement through contact with the internet.

Analyzing the FIB page, it can be seen that the advertising is aimed at both the public already integrated into the movement and those who are not supporters. They bring informative texts, images of meetings and marches, some texts extolling the figure of Plínio Salgado and the objectives of the movement. It is also possible to find texts that criticize current politics. In this sense, the internet is a fundamental tool in the propagation of the organization's ideas.

Social networks are another important source of dissemination. On Facebook, it is possible to verify the presence of integralist activism in different groups or communities. In this last network, for example, the official FIB page has almost 16,000 subscribers, while more than 1,600 people participate in the exchange of messages in the official group. Although with fewer interactions, the organization also maintains an official presence on YouTube, Flickr, Google+ and Twitter.

=== Political involvement ===
The FIB officially claims not to claim to be a political party and to have no ties to any of the existing parties, but it is not opposed to a future onslaught in this area, in what appears to be probably one of the organization's smallest demands.

Although this is the speech, in practice the story is a little different. For CALDEIRA NETO (2008), the FIB, among the various nationalist groups whom he analyzed, was the organization that established closest contact with political parties, "specifically the Party of the Reconstruction of the National Order (PRONA), founded by Enéas Ferreira Carneiro, who, according to Victor (2004), he even expressed appreciation for the integralists ('This is before my time', 'there are some similarities between us and the integralists'; 'All nationalists love their country equally'), in an interview published in The New York Times. It is not by chance that the Integralist Brazilian Front even directed the votes of its activists to PRONA, considered by FIB as "the only legend worthy of votes by conscientious Brazilians", whereas PRONA would have absorbed a large part of the social and nationalist ideals of the country integralism.

As of 2018, the organization deepened a strong relationship with the Brazilian Labour Renewal Party (PRTB), led by Levy Fidelix. On the occasion of the elections that year, the candidate of the presidential candidate Jair Bolsonaro himself for the Government of São Paulo, Rodrigo Tavares, recorded a video with the President of the FIB, at the end of which he shouted the integralist greeting "anauê". Levy Fidelix, for his part, used, during his campaign for federal deputy, the integralist slogan "God, Fatherland and Family". In the elections, the PRTB was the only party to associate with Bolsonaro's PSL, guaranteeing the vice president from 2019 to 2022 to General Hamilton Mourão. On 30 December 2019, a member of the FIB and former Patriota and PRONA candidate for Congress, Paulo Fernando Melo da Costa, was appointed as a special advisor to Human Rights Minister Damares Alves in the Bolsonaro administration. In 2021, FIB leaders joined Roberto Jefferson's Brazilian Labor Party (PTB).

In recent years, the FIB has submitted to its members lists of support for candidates in different parts of Brazil. Some of these candidacies are their own, but anchored in different legends, such as that of an integralist who, in 2010 and in 2014, ran for federal deputy for the Federal District and received, respectively, 13,750 votes in the first attempt and 27,444 votes in the second, number considerable, but insufficient to guarantee a seat in the National Congress.

On another occasion, the integralists were also considered as a political force in the re-foundation of the National Renewal Alliance (ARENA), a party created to support the military regime, whose reorganization campaign seeks the total number of signatures required for registration with the TSE.

=== Manifestations ===
The FIB encourages its centers to periodically organize public demonstrations with the aim of paying civic homage, propagating integralist ideals or the organization's opinion on a given topic. With these three guiding axes as the north, it became common for researchers to see the blue flags of integralism on important holidays, such as the Independence of Brazil and the Constitutionalist Revolution (in São Paulo), in leaflets and public meetings in large cities or in defense of specific issues, such as demonstrations against abortion or against bills that seek to decriminalize drugs, for example.

==== Protests in Brazil in 2013 ====
The integralists were officially accused by countless left-wing organizations, among them the Party of the Workers' Cause (PCO), the Unified Socialist Workers Party (PSTU), the Communist Party of Brazil (PCdoB) and the Central Unica dos Trabalhadores (CUT), of having co-opted and redirected the agenda of the demonstrations, initially led by the Movimento Passe Livre (MPL).

In fact, as of June 17, at the height of popular support for the protests, widespread demonstrations of repudiation of the presence of political party flags in the demonstrations began to occur. Party militants, who carried flags, on the other hand, immediately described intolerance of party flags as fascism.

Although the FIB admits to having participated in the protests, the organization denies any responsibility for acts of vandalism or violence against members of political parties and union centrals. Likewise, despite the integralist presence in the demonstrations, the vast majority of people did not have a clear political position.

== Attacks at the University of São Paulo ==
On November 29, 2017, the National President of the Brazilian Integralist Front, Victor Emanuel Vilela Barbuy, was invited to give the lecture "Municipality and Municipalism in Brazil" during the 6th Latin American Philology and Culture Symposium, held at the Faculty of Philosophy, Letters and Human Sciences of the University of São Paulo (FFLCH-USP). The event was organized by the Department of Classical and Vernacular Letters and the America România Research Group of the college itself. The lecture to be given by Barbuy, lawyer and master in Civil Law, would address municipalism, a political system that calls for more autonomy to the municipalities and the decentralization of public administration.

Upon arriving for the lecture, Barbuy was surprised and expelled by about 200 students. Soon after, the lecture "Frei Galvão, the Architect of Light", by the filmmaker, composer, writer and cultural producer Malcolm Forest, was interrupted by a group of students who invaded the room shouting slogans.

The Diário da Causa Operária published four videos on the case, entitled "fascists, will not pass", "act against fascists at USP" and "fascist place is at the edge of the rifle". The Diário's blog published: "This is another episode that shows that the path to be followed is the path of fighting against the right. Contrary to what the petty-bourgeois left defends, it is impossible to defeat the coup and the right only with speeches. We need a policy that strongly opposes the coup. In the case of the extreme right, which is a by-product of the advance of the coup, we must be prepared to fight with whatever means are necessary. Students showed how to do."

== See also ==
- Gustavo Barroso
- Brazilian Integralist Action
- Integralism
- Party of Popular Representation
- Plínio Salgado
