= Brazilian integralism =

Political movement in Brazil

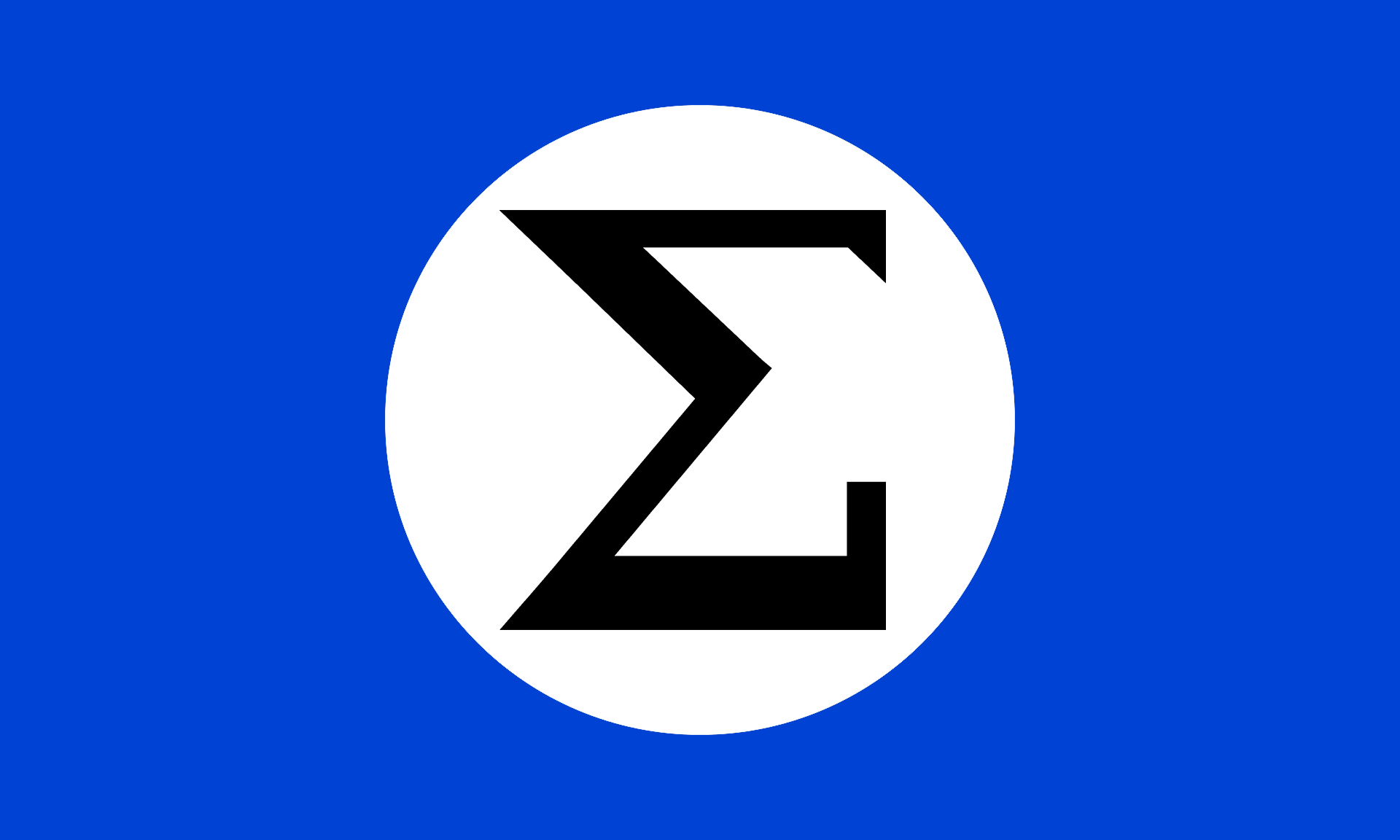
Flag of the Brazilian Integralist Action

Brazilian integralism (Portuguese: integralismo) was a fascist political movement in Brazil, created in October 1932. Founded and led by Plínio Salgado, a literary figure somewhat famous for his participation in the 1922 Modern Art Week, the movement had adopted some characteristics of European mass movements of those times, specifically of Italian fascism, but distanced itself from Nazism because Salgado himself did not support racism. He believed that every person of every race should unite under the Integralist flag. Despite the movement's slogan "Union of all races and all peoples", members and leaders like Gustavo Barroso held antisemitic views.

The name of the party created to support its doctrine was Brazilian Integralist Action (Portuguese: Ação Integralista Brasileira, AIB). The reference to Integralism mirrored a traditionalist movement in Portugal, the Lusitanian Integralism. For its symbol, the AIB used a flag with a white disk on a royal blue background, with an uppercase sigma (Σ) in its center. (In mathematics, a capital sigma often indicates a summation of terms, while a common definition of an integral is the Riemann integral defined in terms of a summation, representing the "integration" of all societal elements towards the nation.)

== Character ==
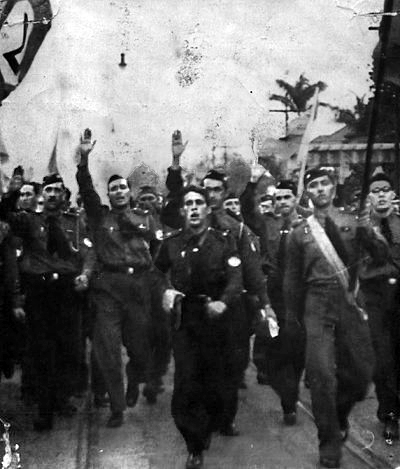
The Integralist salute, "Anauê!", which means "you are my brother!" (believed by some to have originated in a Tupi language expression)

In its outward forms, Integralism was similar to European fascism: a green-shirted paramilitary organization with uniformed ranks, highly regimented street demonstrations, and rhetoric against Marxism and liberalism. However, it differed markedly from it in specific ideology: a prolific writer before turning political leader, Salgado interpreted human history at large as an opposition between "materialism"—understood by him as the normal operation of natural laws guided by blind necessity—and "spiritualism": the belief in God, in the immortality of the soul, and in the conditioning of individual existence to superior, eternal goals. Salgado advocated, therefore, the harnessing of individual interest to values such as pity, self-donation and concern to others. For him, human history consisted of the eternal struggle of the human spirit against the laws of nature, as expressed by the atheism of modern society in the twin forms of liberalism and socialism—capitalist competition leading eventually to the merger of private capitals in a single state-owned economy. Thus the integralists favoured nationalism as a shared spiritual identity, in the context of a heterogeneous and tolerant nation influenced by Christian virtues—such virtues being concretely enforced by means of an authoritarian government enforcing compulsory political activity under the guidance of an acknowledged leader.

In particular, they drew support from military officers, especially in the Brazilian Navy.

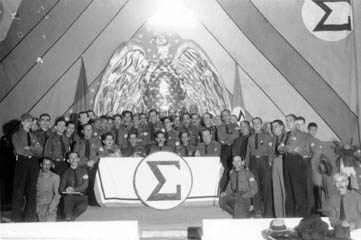
Closing session of the Integralist Congress in Blumenau, 1935

Integralism being a mass movement, there were marked differences in ideology among its leaders under the influence of various international fascist and quasi-fascist contemporary movements, as in the issue of anti-Semitism. While Salgado was against it, Gustavo Barroso, the party's chief doctrinaire after Salgado, was known for his militant antisemitic views, becoming notorious for being the author of the first and so far only Portuguese translation of The Protocols of the Elders of Zion; he was also the author of various antisemitic works of his own (Judaism, Freemasonry and Communism; Sinagogues in São Paulo). This led to at least two serious ruptures in the movement: one in 1935 and the other, 1936, when Salgado almost renounced leadership of the movement.

One of the most important principles in an Integralist's life was the "Internal Revolution", or "Revolution of the Self", through which a man was encouraged to stop thinking only for himself, and instead start to integrate into the idea of a giant integralist family—becoming one with the Homeland, while also leaving behind selfish and "evil" values.

== Attitudes of the Vargas dictatorship ==
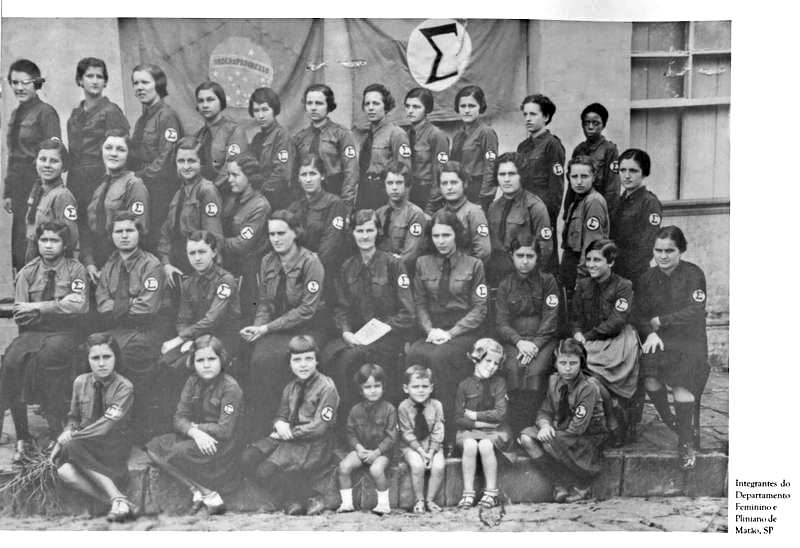
Departamento Feminino e de Juventude (Women and Youth Department)

In the beginning of the 1930s, Brazil went through a strong wave of political radicalism. Following the Revolution of 1930, the oligarchic First Brazilian Republic was overthrown and replaced by the new revolutionary government of Getúlio Vargas. The new government had a degree of support from workers because of the labor laws he introduced, and competed with the Brazilian Communist Party for working-class support. In the face of communist advances, and at the same time building on his intensive crackdown against the Brazilian left, Vargas turned to the integralist movement as a single mobilized base of right-wing support. With center-left factions excluded from the Vargas' coalition and the left crushed, Vargas progressively set out to co-opt the populist movement to attain the widespread support that allowed him eventually (in 1937) to proclaim his Estado Novo—a corporatist "New State".

Integralism had a rapidly growing membership throughout Brazil by 1935, especially among German Brazilians and Italian Brazilians (approximately two million people), and began to fill this ideological void. In 1934, the Integralists targeted the communist movement of Luiz Carlos Prestes, mobilizing a conservative base of mass support that engaged in street brawls. In 1934, after Vargas' delicate alliance with labor disintegrated and formed his new alliance with the AIB, Brazil entered one of the most agitated periods in its political history. Brazil's major cities began to resemble 1932–1933 Berlin with its street battles between the Communist Party of Germany and the Nazi Party. By mid-1935, Brazilian politics had been drastically destabilized.

== Crackdown and legacy ==
When Vargas established full dictatorial powers under the Estado Novo in 1937, he turned against the integralist movement. Although AIB favored Vargas' hard right turn, Salgado was overly ambitious, with overt presidential aspirations that threatened Vargas' grip on power. In 1938, the Integralists made a last attempt at achieving power, attacking the Guanabara Palace during the night, but police and army troops arrived at the last minute, and the ensuing gunfight ended with around twenty casualties. This attempt was called the Integralist "Pajama Putsch".

The AIB disintegrated after that 1938, and in 1945, when the Vargas dictatorship ended, Salgado founded the Party of Popular Representation (PRP), which maintained the ideology of Integralism, but without the uniforms, salutes, signals, and signs. The various political leaderships raised among Integralism dispersed into various ideological positions during subsequent political struggles. Some former members participated in the 1964 military coup that overthrew President João Goulart. Other former integralists associated later with the Left, such as Goulart's foreign minister San Tiago Dantas, and the Catholic bishop D. Hélder Câmara.

== Integralists and the military dictatorship (1964–1985) ==
Integralists and former Integralists took a range of positions inside the military right-wing dictatorship that followed the 1964 Brazilian coup d'état. Plínio Salgado joined the ARENA, the pro-military party. Augusto Rademaker and Márcio Melo, former Integralists, were two of the three-member junta that briefly ruled Brazil in 1969, in the transition from the second military government of Artur da Costa e Silva to the third (that of Emílio Médici). Rademaker was also vice-president of the third military government. He was generally considered one of the most diehard rightists in the contemporary military top brass. Many former Integralists in the military occupied government posts in the second and third military administrations. On the other hand, Dom Hélder Câmara, also a former Integralista, operated at the time was the best-known opponent of the regime.

== 21st century ==
Today, two small remnant groups in Brazil uphold the strict integralist ideology: the "Frente Integralista Brasileira" (FIB) and the "Movimento Integralista e Linearista Brasileiro" (MIL-B). The FIB has close ties to Levy Fidelix's Brazilian Labour Renewal Party (PRTB), and supported the successful Jair Bolsonaro 2018 presidential campaign in the second round of the 2018 Brazilian presidential election In 2021, FIB leaders joined Roberto Jefferson's Brazilian Labor Party (PTB). Previously, many integralists were involved in Enéas Carneiro's Party of the Reconstruction of the National Order (PRONA), which dissolved in 2006.

On 26 December 2019, a group called the "Popular Nationalist Insurgency Command of the Large Brazilian Integralist Family" claimed responsibility for a firebombing of the headquarters of comedy group Porta dos Fundos in Rio de Janeiro.

On 30 December 2019, a member of the FIB and former Patriota and PRONA candidate for Congress, Paulo Fernando Melo da Costa, was appointed as a special advisor to Human Rights Minister Damares Alves in the Bolsonaro administration. Sara Winter, a former member of Brazilian FEMEN, who worked in the ministry as national coordinator of maternity policies, while a member of Femen, declared that she sympathized with the ideas of Plínio Salgado, referring to him as a "defender of the country". Also in the Bolsonaro government, Sara was part of the 300 do Brasil group, which had armed members and preached anti-democratic actions like the return of Institutional Act Number Five. In her campaign for the Senate in the 2022 Brazilian general election in the Federal District, Damares Alves claimed to identify with Integralism.

== See also ==
- Grandpa Indian
