= Sheaf of Paddy (politics) =

Symbol of the Bangladesh Nationalist Party

Symbol of the Bangladesh Nationalist Party

The Sheaf of Paddy (Bengali: ধানের শীষ) is the political symbol of the Bangladesh Nationalist Party (BNP).

After the establishment of Pakistan, the National Awami Party (NAP) chose this symbol and participated in the elections. The Sheaf of Paddy was finalized as the symbol of NAP after the party was founded by Abdul Hamid Khan Bhashani after he quit the Awami Muslim League. After the split in the party in 1967, National Awami Party (Wali) chose the hut as its symbol and National Awami Party (Bhashani) chose the Sheaf of Paddy as its symbol and participated in 1973 Bangladeshi general election. When Bangladesh Nationalist Party (BNP) was formed 7 years after the independence of Bangladesh, most of Bhasani's NAP workers joined the party. Bhasani's symbol started to be used by BNP after the formation of the party.

Ahead of the 2018 Bangladeshi general election, the BNP had sent a letter to the Bangladesh Election Commission saying that the seven parties of the 20 Party Alliance, other than the party, could use the symbol. On 19 November, 2018, a lawyer filed a writ in the court to change the name of BNP symbol. As the reason for the writ, he cited that although the party's symbol is "Bunch of Paddy", the party authority call it "Sheaf of Paddy". In 2018, Abdul Kader Siddique claimed at an election rally that the Sheaf of Paddy was originally the symbol of Abdul Hamid Khan Bhasani's party and he later gave the symbol to Ziaur Rahman for BNP. He was criticized by BNP workers for this statement. In 2018, the Bangladesh Jamaat-e-Islami had internal disagreements regarding using the paddy symbol when filing their candidates during the general elections. Out of the 85 candidates, 25 of them were running under the BNP paddy symbol. Among the alliance, the Jatiya Oikya Front announced that all involved in the alliance will pick a common symbol, which they selected the paddy as. In 2026, Bangladeshi prime minister and BNP chairperson Tarique Rahman sparked a historic controversy by making a statement nearly identical to that of Siddique.

== See also ==
- Boat (politics) – Electoral symbol of the Awami League
- Plough (politics) – Symbol of the Jatiya Party (Ershad)
