= Boat (politics) =

Electoral symbol of the Awami League

The boat symbol

The Boat is the electoral symbol of the Bangladesh Awami League.

After the Pakistani independence, the East Bengal-based United Front wanted to use the plough as its symbol for the 1954 East Bengal Legislative Assembly election. However, as the symbol was used in British India by the Krishak Praja Party, the government did not allow this. Instead, they chose a boat.

Following the dissolution of the United Front in 1957, the East Pakistan Awami League (one of the United Front's member parties) used the boat. The All-Pakistan Awami League then won the 1970 Pakistani general election using the boat symbol.

The Bangladesh Krishak Sramik Awami League, a member party of the Awami League-led 8 Party Alliance, participated in the 1986 Bangladeshi general election using the boat symbol.

Before the 2018 Bangladeshi general election, 11 political parties wanted to participate using the boat symbol under the Awami League-led Grand Alliance.

In 2023, three parties (Jatiya Samajtantrik Dal, the Jatiya Party (Manju) and the Workers Party of Bangladesh), all member parties of the Awami League based 14 Party Alliance, decided to use the boat symbol for the 2024 Bangladeshi general election. In 2024, the Awami League authority decided not to grant their party symbol to anyone for the local elections to resolve disputes among party workers. Instead, they decided that candidates from the party could use any symbol they wanted.

== See also ==
- Sheaf of Paddy (politics) – Symbol of the Bangladesh Nationalist Party
- Plough (politics) – Symbol of the Jatiya Party (Ershad)
