= Sara Winter =

Brazilian activist and politician

Sara Huff
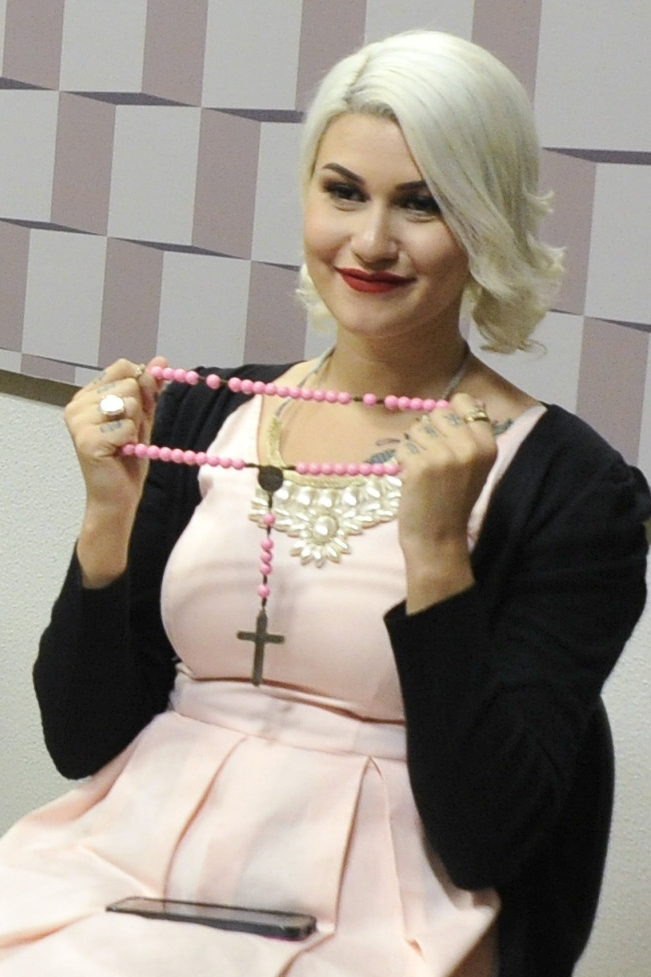
- Born: Sara Fernanda Giromini; 18 June 1992 (age 34); São Carlos, São Paulo, Brazil
- Other names: Sara Winter; Sara Huff
- Known for: Naked protest; Feminism; Political activism
- Political party: PSC (2016–2018); DEM (2018–2020)
- Movement: Femen (formerly)
- Spouse: Joseph Huff (m. 2022)
- Website: sarawinter.com.br

Sara Fernanda Giromini (born June 18, 1992), known as Sara Huff and previously Sara Winter, is a Brazilian activist anti-feminist and right-wing politician. She was the founder of the Brazilian variant of the Femen group, but after the second half of 2013 she worked in her own group, BastardXs. As of 2015, she joined the "Pro-Woman group", at the same time that she started to fight against the agendas she once defended, including the social construction of genders, feminism and the legalization of abortion, defending since then political positions linked to the right and conservatism.

Winter was a candidate for federal deputy for the Democrats in Rio de Janeiro in the 2018 elections, failing to get elected.

In 2019, she was coordinator of maternity policies at the Ministry of Women, Family and Human Rights of the Bolsonaro government, which she defends.

In 2020,Winter became the leader of 300 do Brasil, a pro-Bolsonaro activist group that organized demonstrations against the Supreme Federal Court (STF) and the National Congress.Researchers have argued that the group drew inspiration from European fascist movements, citing its paramilitary aesthetics anti-democratic and tactics of political intimidation. In June 2020, Winter was temporarily arrested by order of the Supreme Federal Court as part of an investigation into the organization and financing of anti-democratic acts.

== Biography ==
Sara Fernanda Giromini lived with her parents in the city of São Carlos, in the interior of the state of São Paulo. With a history of family violence, Sara said she had experienced various types of abuse, including sexual abuse. She was a prostitute, having worked in prostitution for ten months.

=== Feminist activism ===
According to statements given through interviews, Winter said that she joined the feminist movements because she wanted in some way to exterminate all types of violence against women. At nineteen, to integrate and found a cell of the anti-sex group Femen in Brazil, she traveled to the city of Kyiv to receive training and meet one of the group's leaders, Inna Shevchenko.

She founded the Brazilian branch of Femen under the pseudonym Sara Winter and at the same time became a member of the pro-bisexuality movement "BastardXs". Upon returning to the country in 2012, the activist described her ideology as follows:

"Our ideology is sextremism, a form of opposition to male chauvinism. And nudity has been used by patriarchal society ever since, naked women or not selling all kinds of products. Since we are women, instead of selling products, we sell social ideas. Since everyone likes to look at a woman's body, we use our body to send a message written on the chest, a protest."

The group suffered a turnaround with the closing of its Brazilian subsidiary less than a year after its inauguration. In an official statement, the headquarters removed the Winter's right to use the name Femen. In May 2013, Ukrainian Alexandra Shevchenko, one of the founders of Femen, said that Sara "is no longer part of our group, we had a lot of problems with her. She is not ready to be a leader".

The group's founder, Anna Hutsol, also threatened to "reveal the real reason why Sara entered Femen". In retaliation, Sara made several criticisms of the group, stating that it was a company and a marketing action rather than a legitimate social movement also saying that Brazilian women were never consulted in relation to the group's actions and that "they no longer had any desire to be represented by them". Former number two of the group, Bruna Themis, also spoke critically towards Femen in an interview, stating that it is a movement without proposals, which excludes women who are outside the standard of beauty considered "appropriate" and that finds herself distanced from the ideals of feminism and accusing Sara of centralization, authoritarianism and sympathy for Nazism.

Bruna's statements echoed on social media, where rumors emerged that Sara belonged to a neo-Nazi group during her youth due to an Iron Cross tattooed on her body. The activist denied participation in such groups, but acknowledged that she maintained contact with neo-Nazis over the internet when she was about 15 years old, and that she really had some ideas similar to those of that movement, but stated that as she grew up she would have realized that it was a "very wrong thought".

Winter declares herself an admirer of Plínio Salgado, founder of the Brazilian far-right party inspired by Italian fascism, known as Brazilian Integralist Action during the 1930s – evaluating that said political personality was a "defender of the country".

In December 2013, despite having in her history a protest against social alienation caused by the television program Big Brother Brasil, Sara was a candidate for a place in the 2014 edition of the program.

In January 2014, Winter became, moreover, an emblem of homosexual and anti-Christian activism by posing half naked, kissing another activist (Bia Spring), in front of the Church of Our Lady of Candelária, in Rio de Janeiro.

=== Anti-abortion activism ===
In 2014, she completely abandoned any association with any feminist groups she had previously integrated, having even published videos on YouTube where she asked Christians for forgiveness because of her behavior towards them. Soon after, she published a book called Bitch, No! Seven Times I Was Betrayed by Feminism, detailing negative experiences she had within the movement in what she accuses them of having pushed her to use drugs, to have unwanted relationships with strangers, so even as the movement claims to fight for women's rights. She then became an activist within an Anti-abortion movement called Pró-Mulher ("Pro-Woman"). At the same time, she writes and gives lectures alongside a psychologist.

As soon as the activist became the mother of a child in October 2015, she revealed that she had already aborted her first pregnancy but that now she would have reformed her positions on abortion, becoming contrary to this practice. She also embraced Roman Catholic Christianity, stating that she intends to raise her son "based on the Ten Commandments".

The ex-feminist considers that her page on social networks has been more successful since she left the "leftist" groups, and has sustained herself through lectures and book sales. Additionally, she intends to capitalize on her experience, writing a new book telling the experiences of ex-feminists who left the movement and were persecuted. She also intends to enter a political career, a dream she has had since she was a child. Since then, Sara Winter has been associated with conservative personalities of Brazilian politics, such as Everaldo Dias Pereira, Marco Feliciano and Jair Bolsonaro, with whom she announced a political partnership in 2016 stating that they will fight against a supposed inversion of values in society that would be caused by left-wing social movements such as: feminism, black movement, LGBT movement and "gender ideology".

During the 2018 presidential elections, Winter called to vote for Jair Bolsonaro. She was a candidate for the Chamber of Deputies of Brazil, by the Democrats of Rio de Janeiro in 2018 but she was not get elected herself.

In April 2019, she was appointed national coordinator of maternity policies at the Ministry of Women, Family and Human Rights, under the administration of Minister Damares Alves, asking for resignation in November of the same year.

In 2020, her trajectory became a documentary: A Vida de Sara produced by Matheus Bazzo and directed by Julia Sondermann. In this film, of marked conservative nature, it is possible to see Winter's metamorphosis until she becomes one of the heroines of the Brazilian extreme right. In April of the same year, during the COVID-19 pandemic, Winter returned to the news by promoting the creation of a paramilitary group, called "Os 300 do Brasil", which defends the policies of President Jair Bolsonaro. This group presents itself as a kind of Bolsonaro's praetorian guard, camped in the Praça dos Três Poderes and willing to "Ukrainize Brazil", that is, to promote a civil war, similar to the one that has faced Ukraine since 2014. Because of that, Winter was expelled from Democrats (DEM) in May 2020.

On May 27, 2020, Sara Winter was the target of a search and seizure mandate from the Federal Police in the operation that investigates the Fake News inquiry, a millionaire scheme involving businessmen and bloggers to spread false news and create and maintain false profiles (robots / bots). After having her cell phone and computer seized, Sara recorded a video with threats and curses to STF minister Alexandre de Moraes, who had authorized the operation. The minister forwarded the video to the PGR.

In June 2020, she was arrested in connection with an investigation into anti-democratic rallies. Her brother said that he was happy she had been arrested, describing her as "a totally out-of-control person".

In August 2020, Winter leaked confidential information of a 10-year-old rape victim in order to prevent abortion. Brazil allows the intervention of pregnancy in certain cases, such as foetal anencephaly, rape and when the mother's health is at risk. Protestors gathered outside the hospital despite the victim obtaining legal permission for the procedure. This resulted in the victim having to be smuggled into the hospital.

=== Criticism ===
National and international feminist groups harshly criticized Winter's positions at the head of the group, considering that Sara does not know feminism in depth and defends contradictory flags or that do not make sense for the Brazilian reality. The Ukrainian organization Femen went so far as to say that the Brazilian "did not respect the group's ideology" and also accused her of lying and "doing dishonest things", such as not carrying out actions for which she received money from Europe. She also presents herself as a "defender of life". In addition, she also defends the liberation of weapons for the entire population and made several publications on her social networks bearing weapons and preaching their use against political rivals.

== See also ==
- Antifeminism
- Anti-abortion feminism
- Camille Paglia
- Christina Hoff Sommers
- Gianna Jessen
- Norma McCorvey
- Women's history
- Women Against Feminism

== Bibliography ==
- INÍCIO Vadia, Não! – Setes vezes que fui traída pelo feminismo, 2015, 30 pp.
