= Movimento Passe Livre =

The Free Fare Movement (Portuguese: Movimento Passe Livre, Brazilian Portuguese: [moviˈmẽtu ˈpasi ˈlivɾi]) is a Brazilian social movement that advocates the adoption of free fares in mass transit. The movement was founded in a session during the Worldwide Social Forum in 2005, in Porto Alegre, and gained prominence for its participation in the planning of the 2013 Brazilian protests.

== Proposals ==
The major demand of the movement is the migration of the private transport system to a public system, an event which would guarantee universal access by free fares. For the movement, this would bring about a system free of social exclusion. The actions of the movement include dissemination, studies and analysis of local transport systems, and then taking this information to various groups within the cities. The movement also participates in protests, manifestations, interventions, and popular-initiative pushes for legislation. The movement uses such tactics to pressure the government, believing it to be the best way of doing politics within the current socio-political context.

The movement is organized on basic principles, approved in a session on free fares during the Fifth World Social Forum, inside the Espaço Caracol Intergalactika. From then, it was officially known as the Free Fare Movement. Its principles at the time were autonomy, independence, non-partisanship, horizontality, anti-capitalism and decisions by consensus. During the 3rd National Free Pass Movement Meeting (ENMPL), in July 2006, federalism was added as a principle. These principles can be modified by way of consensus.

== History ==
The popular revolt which started the Free Fare Movement happened in Salvador, capital of the state of Bahia. In 2003, thousands of Brazilian young people, students, and workers closed the public roads, protesting against a raise in transport fares. Over the course of 10 days, the city was effectively paralyzed. The event was so significant that it became a documentary, called "A Revolta do Buzu". The demonstrations came to an end when traditional student groups (such as the UNE and the UJS) set themselves up as leaders of the revolt they had not started, and went to negotiate with the government behind closed doors. These groups presented 10 demands, of which 9 were met, including half-price fares for postgraduate students and the right to half-price fare for all students during the weekends. The main complaint of the street demonstrations was not met: the demonstrations increased in force. However, after the negotiations, the population was demobilized and street actions lost their force.

In 2004, a group in Florianópolis, inspired by the events of Salvador, articulated a position different from that of the traditional student organizations. After a week of intense mobilizations and protests, the city came to halt in the famous "Revolta da Catraca" or "Tomorrow will be greater." The demand was once again the reduction of bus fares, and had the participation of other groups, such as neighborhood associations, teachers, and the population in general. The protests were quite successful, and that year the increase in fares was repealed. In 2005, a further increase was announced, however, after a month of protesting, the city announced the cancellation of that increase.

In the following years, protests against fare increases and against the current transport system occurred in several regions of Brazil, such as São Paulo, Itu, Belo Horizonte, Curitiba, Cuiabá, Porto Alegre, Rio de Janeiro, Brasília, Joinville, Blumenau, Fortaleza, Recife, Aracaju, Rio Branco, among others. In 2006, the bus fare rate was reduced after public protests in Vitória.

In early 2011, increases in ticket prices for public transportation provoked massive demonstrations in Brazil, especially in São Paulo, where the fight against rising prices met weekly for three months; with almost 2,000 students in the downtown streets. The period was also marked by achievements in the North: in Belém, organized protestors succeeded in reversing a price hike, and, in Porto Velho, the increase was suspended for two weeks.

== Organization of the Free Pass Movement ==
The movement’s national articulation is done through National Working Groups (GTN, Portuguese: Grupos de Trabalho Nacional), where the movement organizes joint actions, national announcements (such as the national newspaper of the movement) and the National Meeting of the Free Pass Movement (ENMPL). In the last ENMPL, the creation of Working Groups in communication, organization, and legal support was decided.

== National Day of Free Passage ==
The 26 October is considered the National Day of the Struggle for Free Passage. Its first "edition" took place in 2005, where a turnstile in flames symbolized the union of the events that took place in 14 cities. The date was chosen because it was the day that the bill by petition (with some 20,000 signatures) was voted on in the City Council of Florianópolis. The project was approved on 4 November.

== See also ==
- 2013 Brazilian protests
- Police strike
