= Taxation in Brazil =

Taxation in Brazil is complex, with over sixty forms of tax. Historically, tax rates were low and tax evasion and avoidance were widespread. The 1988 Constitution called for an enhanced role of the State in society, requiring increased tax revenue. In 1960, and again between 1998 and 2004, efforts were made to make the collection system more efficient. Tax revenue gradually increased from 13.8% of GDP in 1947 to 37.4% in 2005. Tax revenue has become quite high by international standards. More than half the total tax is in the regressive form of taxes on consumption.

== Considerations on taxes in Brazil ==
The Brazilian tax system is a legacy of the Empire, a period that was initially focused on taxes on imports. It had its first significant change only with the Constitution of 1934, when internal taxes on products began to gain projection. In 1960 a reform in order to increase the storage capacity of the state and increase the economic efficiency of the system was introduced. After 1960, alterations were made only in the sense of raising the storage capacity and reduce the degree of distribution of taxes between the federal entities. The end result is that the system is caught in a vicious circle, where tax rates are high and taxes are created. The Brazilian tax reality is notoriously complex, bringing a huge financial cost to the taxpayer, and also causing the constant insecurity of being or not complying with all obligations required by the tax authorities.

The site IBPT – Brazilian Institute of Tax Planning – includes data for 2006 that demonstrate the existence of about 61 taxes levied in Brazil, including taxes, fees and contributions. The system is further overloaded by the huge amount of rules governing the tax system, supplementary laws, ordinary laws, decrees, orders, instructions. There are over 3,000 standards in effect, and the cost that companies have to comply with ancillary obligations is about 1% of their turnover. Those human needs for which the state is responsible, can only be met from the collection of taxes. Moreover, the existence of tax collection is essential for the organized state to maintain itself.

== General considerations on the national tax structure ==
The real growth of federal revenues grew more quickly between 1998 and 2004. Nevertheless, the differences noted throughout that period are too sharp to be explained only by higher rates. The additional variable used to explain the recent behavior of the collection, where successive records are announced, is the surveillance effort, which was significantly increased over the last ten years. During that period there was a move towards to raise the efficiency of the supervisory structure through increases in infrastructure, personnel and new laws.

Revenue gains with increases in existing rates are potentially higher than those that would occur with the creation of new taxes. One of the Brazilian government's objectives was, in recent years, raising revenue to reduce the public deficit, with the exchange of more complex taxes by less complex collection and can be cited as an example of this strategy the creation of the CPMF, producing significant gains. Additional gains from such exchange of taxes are obtained by more effective surveillance for less complex in terms of tax collection.

It can be seen that the level of effort made by the federal government in order to increase tax revenue, was not negligible in recent years. The increase in the number of registered companies in the outstanding debt shows the growing work of the Attorney General of the National Treasury. There is a direct relationship between revenues and the balance in charge, indicating a high degree of importance of the efforts made by the authorities in the audit.

== Tax policy and social function tribute ==
It should be stressed how aloof are individuals before tax levies. The story of all time, is filled with expressions of displeasure about the state initiative to make tax releases, mainly because, in purely arithmetical terms, the payment of taxes produces impoverishment of the taxpayer. On the other hand, that same taxpayer is not always pleased with the way the state manages the earned financial resources. Brazil is an economy with low tax tradition, where evasion and avoidance are not suppressed with the same intensity observed in other countries with more solid tax tradition.

The relationship between the state and the taxpayer has been characterized for a long time as a relationship of power and coercion. In constitutional terms, the highlights are the principles that seek to delimit the state action. This action falls within the context of tax policy. The tax policy, although it consists of tax collection instrument necessarily need not result in imposition and may have tax and extrafiscal character. It is understood as fiscal policy, taxation of activities carried out with the purpose of raising money, or transferring money from the private to the public coffers. The state just wants to get funding. Extrafiscal policy through the tax legislation could encourage or discourage behavior, according to the interests of society, through a regressive or progressive taxation, or for the granting of tax incentives. It can be said that through this policy, taxation activity is intended to interfere in the economy, i.e. the relations of production and circulation of wealth.

The commitment to the economic development inserted within a theoretical dissociation with the guarantee of equality of opportunity has become latent in the Federal Constitution of 1988, establishing a duty to ensure the full exercise of citizenship within the fundamentals of the Brazilian democratic state. The text of the 1988 Constitution was a milestone, containing legal provisions committed to eradicating poverty and reducing social inequalities, prohibition of discrimination of origin, sex, race and color. In this context, the state assumed new front should those with which exercises its power, starting to design public policies committed to the enhancement of life and reducing inequalities. In this aspect the 1988 Constitution, in a leading position and effective in the economic area, takes the economic model of welfare, giving the state agent role responsible for the planning and creation of public policies for economic development linked to the promotion of economic development, in conjunction with the reduction of inequalities of opportunity policies. Within the new perspective inaugurated by the 1988 Constitution, the committed economic development with social question arises not only as a necessity, but also as state power and duty, imbued with wide autonomy to define its public policies, which brings out of tax law issues as an indispensable tool. Primarily tribute manifests itself in the form of essential burden to finance state activities committed to the creation of social policies.

== Tax burden in Brazil ==
The first known measure of the Brazilian tax burden was made in 1947 and resulted in a percentage of 13.8% of GDP. Since then, the measure has been growing gradually and continuously. Yet, according to data from the Internal Revenue Service of Brazil, in 1965, the Brazilian tax burden reached 19% of GDP. With the change in the Brazilian tax system, made possible by Amendment No. 18 of 1 December 1965, there was significant growth, reaching up to 26% of GDP index. In 1986, the analysis of the tax burden resulted in 26.2% of the national GDP. The analysis of the Federal Revenue of Brazil for 2005 indicates the percentage of 37.37% of GDP. The Brazilian tax burden amounts to 1/3 of the GDP share and places Brazil in the list of countries with the highest burdens in the world, comparable to France, Germany and Sweden, without, however, promoting the same return for the population that these countries provide.

Noteworthy in these figures the importance of indirect taxes levied on all taxpayers. Given this number, it can be inferred that in Brazil, taxes have high share in GDP, these numbers consistent with the levels of developed countries and incompatible with the low quality of state consideration offered, especially in the social sphere. The explicit dichotomy, obtained by analysis of the collection product in relation to the state consideration leads to the unequivocal conclusion that the high national tax revenue is lost before reaching its intended purpose. Revenue collections annually achieves a record: in contrast, investments in state consideration of social services and projects experience a stagnation of the amounts invested, covering the inversely proportional to the growth path, compared to what it collects and population increase.

== Levy profile ==
The collection of federal taxes on the reserve base, shows that of the amount collected by the IRS of Brazil, the majority of the taxes are based on consumption, with approximately 53% on average of the funds raised by Revenue Federal Brazil and continue accounting for more than half of tax (52%) charged by the agency. This tax structure is even more perverse when we add the taxes collected at the state and municipal levels, which bring in the largest source of revenue. The tax burden on consumption is regressive. In Brazil those who earn up to twice the minimum wage spend 26% of their income to pay indirect taxes, while the tax burden for families with income higher than 30 times the minimum wage amounts to only 7%. Excessive taxation on consumption depresses demand directly affecting the economy, reducing the consumption of the middle and lower income families.

Taxes that affect equity in Brazil have an insignificant collection, and the taxes on income remained virtually the same share of the total revenues, from 38.80% on average to 41.14%.

== See also ==
- Cadastro de Pessoas Físicas, the Brazilian individual taxpayer registry
