= Plough (politics) =

Electoral symbol in South Asia

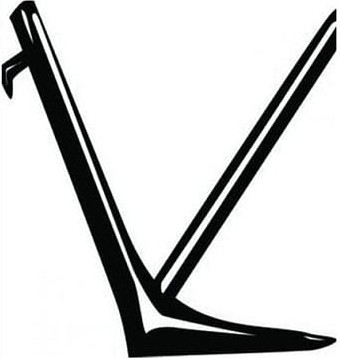
Symbol of Jatiya Party

The Plough is the political symbol of the Jatiya Party (E) in Bangladesh, Jammu & Kashmir National Conference in India and Rastriya Prajatantra Party and Rastriya Prajatantra Party (Samyukta) in Nepal.

== Bangladesh ==
After the independence of Bangladesh, Jatiya League participated in 1973 Bangladeshi general election with the plough. Ataur Rahman Khan, the leader of the party, joined Jatiya Party (JP) in 1984 and then the symbol was chosen and used by JP founder Hussain Muhammad Ershad. During the by-election for Tangail-8 in 1999, Ershad's JP and its breakaway group Manju's JP got into a dispute about the rights of the electoral symbol. However, Bangladesh Election Commission declined both party's application for the usage of the plough. Ershad's JP sought High Court's decision regarding the dispute and the court ruled in favour of Ershad. Later, Manju's party applied writ petition to the Supreme Court but they also ruled in favour of Ershad too.

In 2013, JP decided to not participate for the 2014 Bangladeshi general election. As the party chose not to participate, they requested Bangladesh Election Commission to not allot plough for any party. In 2023, JP demanded to the Election Commission to cancel allotment of the anchor symbol for the Bangladesh Nationalist Movement. As a reason for the demand, the party showed that the anchor is very similar to the plough and voters would be confused during general elections if not removed. In the same year, the party announced to participate in 2024 Bangladeshi general election with their own electoral symbol instead of any alliance. In 2024, Ershad's JP was broken into two factions and both of them demanded the plough as their electoral symbol. But according to the Election Commission, if any faction wants to get the symbol then the factions' leader have to be JP's chairman maintaining the party constitution. The Quader faction claimed that the symbol was allotted to them by the Election Commission. On the other hand, the Rowshan faction claimed that according to the courts' rule the symbol is theirs. In 2025, another faction emerged from Ershad's JP under the leadership of Anisul Islam Mahmud, which claimed the symbol before the election commission.

== India ==
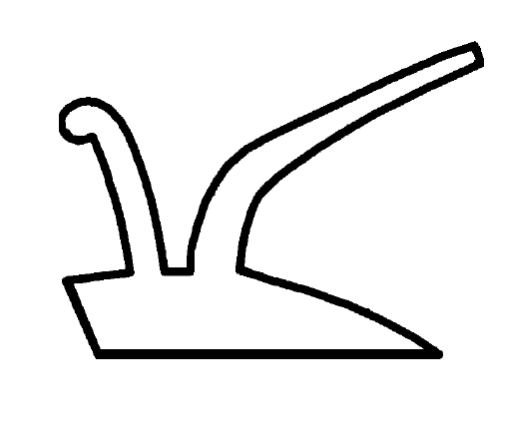
The symbol used in India

The electoral symbol traces its origin to Krishak Praja Party in British India. In 1951, four years after the independence of India, Indian National Congress, Socialist Party, Communist Party of India and Peasants and Workers Party of India wanted to have plough as their electoral symbol. The Election Commission of India solved the dispute by not giving the symbol to any party. Janata Party, formed in 1977, chose the 'farmer with plough' as their electoral symbol. It is also used by Jammu & Kashmir National Conference in India. Before 2023 LAHDC Kargil election, the Kargil Autonomous Hill Development Council requested to ban the symbols' usage in the election. On 6 September 2023, the court declined the request and granted the symbol to the party.

== Nepal ==
The symbol used in Nepal

Nepal Praja Parishad (Mishra) participated in 1959 Nepalese general election with the plough symbol. In 2017, there was a legal dispute about the ownership of the plough symbol as Rastriya Prajatantra Party, Rastriya Prajatantra Party (Prajatantrik) and Ekikrit Rastriya Prajatantrik Party (Rastrabadi) wanted it. Later, the Election Commission of Nepal allotted 'plough inside a circle' to RPP Prajatantrik and 'plough inside a rectangle' to Ekikrit RPP which were almost same. The decision raised concern to the both parties while the Election Commission stated that it did that so that parties can find middle ground and solve disputes over the symbols. RPP and RPP Nepal unified and participated in 2017 Nepalese local elections. After the first phase, RPP politician Pashupati Shumsher Jung Bahadur Rana said at a convention that dropping of the plough symbol was the reason of their poor performance in the elections which was popular in the country.

In 2019, the Election Commission allotted plough to the newly-formed Rastriya Prajatantra Party (Samyukta) (RPP Samyukta) for the 2019 Nepalese by-elections. In 2020, RPP and RPP Samyukta unified as a single political party. As the electoral symbols of both were different, they decided to use plough till March 2021. In 2022, as the Election Commission decided not to allot the plough for RPP because it was not national party, the party leader Rajendra Prasad Lingden threatened to boycott 2022 Nepalese local elections if they don't get the symbol. In 2023, RPP got the plough symbol for the 2024 Nepalese National Assembly election.

== Pakistan ==
After the independence of Pakistan, East Bengal-based United Front wanted to have the plough for the 1954 East Bengal Legislative Assembly election, but as the symbol was used in British India by the Krishak Praja Party, the government didn't grant them the symbol. Instead, they had to choose the boat. Later, Awami League's breakaway group, Jatiya League, which was established in 1968, chose the plough as its electoral symbol and participated in 1970 Pakistani general election. Pakistan National Alliance chose the plough as their electoral symbol for the 1977 Pakistani general election. After Muhammad Zia-ul-Haq became the president in 1978, the symbol was removed from the list of the Election Commission of Pakistan.
