= Mohammad Farhad =

Bangladeshi communist revolutionary

- মোহাম্মদ ফরহাদ
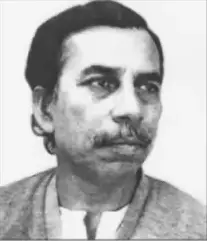
- Mohammad Farhad

Member of Parliament
- In office 1986–1987
- Constituency: Panchagarh-2

President of Communist Party of Bangladesh
- In office 1971–1989
- Preceded by: Moni Singh (as President of Communist Party of East Pakistan)
- Succeeded by: Mujahidul Islam Selim

Personal details
- Born: 5 July 1938 Jamadarpara, Boda, Jalpaiguri District, Bengal Presidency, British India
- Died: 9 October 1987 (aged 49) Moscow, Soviet Union
- Party: Communist Party of Bangladesh
- Children: 2
- Education: Dinajpur Zila School; University of Dhaka (MA in Political Science)
- Occupation: Politician, Guerrilla Commander
- Known for: Commander of the NAP-Communist Party-Students Union Special Guerrilla Forces

Mohammad Farhad Badal (5 July 1938 – 9 October 1987), popularly known as Comrade Farhad, was a Bangladeshi guerrilla force commander during the Bangladesh Liberation War, President of the Communist Party of Bangladesh and a member of Bangladesh Parliament.

== Early life ==
Farhad was born on 5 July 1938 to a Muslim family in the village of Jamadarpara in Boda, Jalpaiguri district, Bengal Presidency (now part of Panchagarh District, Bangladesh). He was the penultimate child among the six children of schoolteacher Ahmed Shafaqat al-Bari and Tayyab-un-Nisa. The family were descended from Sufi pir Qadam Ali Shah. Farhad was educated in Dinajpur, and was proficient in Bengali, Arabic, Persian, Urdu and English. He matriculated from Dinajpur Zila School in 1953 and received his master's degree in political science from the University of Dacca in 1961.

== Politics ==
Comrade Farhad played a role at different times in Pakistan and Bangladesh, including the 1952 Bengali Language Movement, 1962 Education Movement, 1968–69 Pakistan Mass Upheaval, 1971 Bangladesh Liberation War and the post-1971 Democracy movement.

During the 1971 war, he helped lead the guerrilla forces jointly formed by the Communist Party, NAP and Students' Union. A ‘Special Guerilla Force’ under the direct command of CPB-NAP-BSU fought against the Pakistani Army. Moni Singh, the ex-President of CPB, was elected a member of the Advisory Council of the Provisional Government of Bangladesh.

He was imprisoned during the Pakistan period, as well as during the Zia and Ershad period of Bangladesh politics. Mohammad Farhad was elected as a member of Bangladesh Parliament in 1986 from his home district Panchagarh, which he held until his death.

== Death ==
On 8 October 1987, while on an official visit to Moscow, Soviet Union, as a delegate from Bangladesh Parliament, Mohammad Farhad died of a sudden heart attack at the age of 49. He left behind his wife and two children. The Moni Singh-Farhad Memorial Trust was established, twinning his name with that of Communist Party founding member Comrade Moni Singh, now serving as a center for intellectuals in Bangladesh.
