= NAP–Communist Party–Students' Union Special Guerrilla Forces =

Guerrilla movement in the Bangladesh Liberation War

NAP–Communist Party–Students' Union Special Guerilla Forces
- ন্যাপ–কমিউনিস্ট পার্টি–ছাত্র ইউনিয়নের বিশেষ গেরিলা বাহিনী
- Other name: NAP–CPB–BSU
- Leader: Mohammad Farhad
- Deputy commander: Pankaj Bhattacharya
- Commander: Shah Alam
- Dates active: 1971–1972
- Dissolved: 30 January 1972
- Split from: Mukti Bahini
- Country: Pakistan; Bangladesh
- Groups: National Awami Party (Muzaffar); Communist Party of Bangladesh; Bangladesh Students' Union
- Headquarters: Tezpur, Assam, India
- Ideology: Socialism; Communism; Left-wing nationalism
- Political position: Left-wing to far-left
- Status: Dissolved
- Size: 5,000
- Wars: Bangladesh Liberation War

The NAP–Communist Party–Students' Union Special Guerrilla Forces (Note: Bengali: ন্যাপ–কমিউনিস্ট পার্টি–ছাত্র ইউনিয়নের বিশেষ গেরিলা বাহিনী, romanized: nyāp-kômiunisṭ pārṭi-chātrô iuniẏônēr biśēṣ gērilā bāhinī) was an armed guerrilla movement active in the Bangladesh Liberation War. It was organized jointly by the National Awami Party (Muzaffar) (NAP), Communist Party of Bangladesh and the Bangladesh Students' Union. Its commander was Mohammad Farhad, with Pankaj Bhattacharya serving as deputy commander. Per the account of Moni Singh, the NAP-Communist Party-Students Union Special Guerrilla Forces had some 5,000 fighters at its peak.

== Formation ==
After the launching of Operation Searchlight by the West Pakistani government on 25 March 1971, popular militias started to emerge in different parts of Bangladesh. The Communist Party of Bangladesh, and its related organizations like the National Awami Party (Muzaffar), the East Pakistan Students Union (Chhatra Union), the Krishak Samiti and the Trade Union Centre supported the Bangladeshi government-in-exile and instructed its cadres to join the Mukti Bahini. Some 6,000 communists joined the Mukti Bahini. But when Sheikh Mujibur Rahman launched the Mujib Bahini as a special commando force of Mukti Bahini, the Communist Party revised its relations with Mukti Bahini and decided to build a guerrilla force of its own. The build-up of the new guerrilla force was kept secret, only Prime Minister Tajuddin Ahmad was informed of its existence. Along the Indian border, with support from the Communist Party of India, district youth camps were set up on Indian soil where some 20,000 people were trained for armed struggle. The main training camp of the NAP-Communist Party-Students Union Special Guerrilla Forces was located at Tezpur in Assam. There was also the Panighata camp in Siliguri. Whilst some 5,000 of the youth trained in the camps became active in the NAP-Communist Party-Students Union Special Guerrilla Forces, the training camps also supplied the Mukti Bahini with some 12,000 fighters. The Guerrilla Forces were active in Dhaka District, Comilla District, Noakhali District, Chittagong District and Rangpur District, as well as other parts of northern Bangladesh.

== Laying down arms ==
On 30 January 1972, a month after the end of the war, a ceremony was held at Dhaka National Stadium in which the communist guerrilla forces, led by Farhad and joined by Osman Gani of CPB, Pankaj Bhattacharya of NAP(M) and Mujahidul Islam Selim of the Students Union, handed over their arms to President Sheikh Mujibur Rahman.

== Dispute over recognition ==
Fighters of the NAP-Communist Party-Students Union Special Guerrilla Forces were awarded official recognition as freedom fighters. However, on 29 October 2014, the government removed the names of 2,367 ex-guerrillas (including Moni Singh, Muzaffar Ahmed, Mohammad Farhad, Osman Gani, Mujahidul Islam Selim and Bhattacharya) from the official list of freedom fighters, on the grounds that the guerrillas had applied for recognition collectively. On 9 September 2016, the High Court issued a verdict after hearing a writ petition by Bhattacharya, declaring the removal of the 2,367 ex-guerrillas from the freedom fighters' list as illegal. The High Court verdict was challenged by Ministry of Liberation War Affairs, but in January 2017 the Appellate Division upheld the High Court verdict. Additionally, the Appellate Division asked that the government provide the ex-guerrillas with all benefits and honours given to freedom fighters.
