= Bazlur Rahman (journalist) =

Bangladeshi journalist

- বজলুর রহমান
- Born: 3 August 1941; Mymensingh District, Bengal Presidency, British India
- Died: 26 February 2008 (aged 66); Dhaka, Bangladesh
- Education: Brojomohun College; University of Dhaka
- Occupation: Journalist
- Spouse: Matia Chowdhury

Bazlur Rahman (3 August 1941 – 26 February 2008) was a Bangladeshi writer and journalist. He was awarded Independence Day Award in journalism by the Government of Bangladesh in 2012 posthumously.

== Early life ==
Rahman was born on 3 August 1941 in Charniamatpur, Phulpur Upazila, Mymensingh District, East Bengal, British Raj. He graduated from Ganabardi School in 1956 and from Anandamohan College 1958. He completed his B.A. in 1961 from Barisal Brajamohan College and completed his M.A. in economics from the University of Dhaka in 1962.

== Career ==
In 1961, Rahman joined The Daily Sangbad as an assistant editor. He then joined as the assistant editor of The Daily Ittefaq. He was involved with the National Awami Party and East Pakistan Communist Party. He is a founding editor of the Weekly Ekota, which was closely linked to the communist party. In 1971 he fought in the Bangladesh Liberation War and was the editor the Muktijuddha. From 1973 to 1975, he was the general secretary of Bangladesh Afro-Asia Solidarity Council and the acting Editor of The Daily Sangbad.

Rahman was a founding member of the Bangabandhu Parishad in 1980. He served as the senior vice-president and acting president of Bangladesh National Press Club. He was a founding member of Bangladesh-Soviet Friendship Society and served as its president from 1982 to 1990. In 1984 he was the President of International Federation of Journalists's Bangladesh Chapter. He was a director of Bangladesh Sangbad Sangstha and Bangladesh Press Council. From 1998 to 1999, he was the chairman of Khelaghar, a children's welfare organization. He was the editor of the Khelaghar page of The Daily Sangbad. In 2010, he wrote Bangladesher Arthonitir Halchal: 1974–1987, a book about the economy of Bangladesh from 1974 to 1987. His book focused on poverty in Bangladesh.

== Personal life ==
Rahman was married to Matia Chowdhury, a politician of Bangladesh Awami League, member of parliament and former government minister.

== Death ==
Rahman died on 26 February 2008 in Ibrahim Cardiac Centre, Dhaka, Bangladesh from a heart attack. He was buried in the Mirpur Martyred Intellectuals' Graveyard with a guard of honor for his role in the Bangladesh Liberation war.
