= Anti-imperialism Solidarity Day =

Day in Bangladesh

Anti-imperialism Solidarity Day (Bengali: সাম্রাজ্যবাদ-বিরোধী সংহতি দিবস) is observed on 1 January every year by the left-wing parties of Bangladesh aligned with communism, including Communist Party of Bangladesh, Workers Party of Bangladesh, Socialist Party of Bangladesh, and many other left leaning organizations.

== History ==
At the end of 1972, Bangladeshi students made mobilizations against the attack of United States on Vietnam like it was being done by the students all over the world. Likewise, 1 January 1973 was chosen as "Vietnam Solidarity Day".

On 1 January 1973, after the planned students' gathering at Bot Tola students were moving in rally to give a memorandum to the American Embassy at Dhaka. The police tried to disperse the protesters and fired on the rally. Bangladesh Students Union activists Matiul Islam and Mirza Kaderul Islam died in the police firing, and many students were seriously injured.. The incident instigated the students into starting another movement was made against this brutality. On pressure, Sheikh Mujib's government sought apology and accepted demands of the students, later, in which, recognizing Provisional Revolutionary Government of the Republic of South Vietnam was included as a point of demands. Accordingly, Bangladesh government recognised the Revolutionary Government and became the first South Asian and second Asian country to recognize the Revolutionary Government of South Vietnam on 11 February 1973.

== Legacy ==
On 4 September 2008, a memorial sculpture in memory of Matiul Islam and Mirza Kader was inaugurated at the National Press Club. The day of the firing is marked every year by left-leaning organizations in Bangladesh.
