= Moin Hossain Raju =

Bangladeshi student activist and martyr (1968–1992)

- Born: 29 July 1968; Mehendiganj Upazila, Barisal, Bangladesh
- Died: 13 March 1992 (aged 23); Dhaka Medical College and Hospital, Dhaka, Bangladesh
- Cause of death: Gunshot wound
- Other name: Shaheed Moin Hossain Raju
- Education: University of Dhaka
- Occupation: Student activist
- Organization: Bangladesh Students' Union
- Known for: Anti-terrorism protest; subject of Anti Terrorism Raju Memorial Sculpture
- Parent(s): Moazzem Hossain (father); Khadija Begum (mother)

Moin Hossain Raju (Bengali: মঈন হোসেন রাজু; 29 July 1968 – 13 March 1992) was a Bangladeshi student activist and leader of the Bangladesh Students' Union at the University of Dhaka. He was shot and killed on 13 March 1992 while leading a peaceful anti-terrorism demonstration against campus violence at Dhaka University, becoming a symbol of resistance against political violence in Bangladeshi student politics. He is commemorated by the Anti Terrorism Raju Memorial Sculpture, erected in 1997 near the Teacher-Student Centre on the university campus, which has since become a major focal point for student activism in Bangladesh.

== Early life ==
Moin Hossain Raju was born on 29 July 1968 in Mehendiganj Upazila, Barisal, to Moazzem Hossain and Khadija Begum. He completed his higher secondary education and arrived in Dhaka in 1987 to pursue undergraduate studies at the University of Dhaka, where he was enrolled in the Department of Soil, Water and Environment (also referred to as the Department of Soil Science). He resided in Room 122 of Dr. Muhammad Shahidullah Hall on campus.

Beyond his studies and politics, Raju was known for his humanitarian character and wide-ranging interests. He founded the Progga Coaching Center to provide low-cost academic support to financially disadvantaged students. He was a lover of poetry, particularly the works of Jibanananda Das, and also took an interest in painting, often carrying art supplies and handwritten poetry notes in his bag.

== Political activism ==
After arriving at Dhaka University, Raju became active in left-wing student politics, joining the Bangladesh Students' Union (Chhatra Union), the student wing affiliated with the Bangladesh Communist Party. He rose through the organisation's ranks to serve as a member of its Central Committee and as Social Welfare Secretary of both the Bangladesh Students' Union's Dhaka University branch and the Dhaka University Central Students' Union (DUCSU).

Raju played an active role in the anti-autocracy movement of 1990, which ultimately led to the fall of the Ershad military regime and the restoration of parliamentary democracy in Bangladesh.

== Death ==
=== Background ===
By 1992, the University of Dhaka campus had become a site of regular violent clashes between the student wings of the two major political parties: the Bangladesh Chhatra League (affiliated with the Awami League) and the Jatiyatabadi Chhatra Dal (affiliated with the Bangladesh Nationalist Party). These clashes frequently involved firearms.

=== Events of 13 March 1992 ===
On 13 March 1992, armed activists from the Bangladesh Chhatra League and Jatiyatabadi Chhatra Dal engaged in a prolonged gunbattle on campus that lasted approximately two hours. Raju organised a peaceful demonstration through the Democratic Student Unity group — an alliance of eight left-wing student organisations — to protest what they termed "campus terrorism."

The demonstration began after police fired tear gas indiscriminately at general students who had gathered near the Teacher-Student Centre, while declining to act against the armed factions who were still firing weapons. When a police officer ordered the peaceful protesters to disperse, Raju confronted him about the police's inaction against the armed groups. He then initiated a protest march with fellow students, linking arms together — the same formation later depicted in the Anti Terrorism Raju Memorial Sculpture.

While leading this march near the Teacher-Student Centre, approximately 100 yards from the vice-chancellor's residence, Raju was shot in the head by gunmen. He was rushed to Dhaka Medical College and Hospital, where he died at 10:30 PM that night. He was 23 years old. Two other students affiliated with the Communist Party's student wing were also wounded during the incident.

== Legacy ==
Raju is widely regarded as a martyr and symbol of the anti-terrorism movement in Bangladeshi student politics. The Bangladesh Students' Union and a range of other left-wing student organisations observe 13 March annually as "Raju Day," placing wreaths at the memorial sculpture and holding discussions demanding justice for his murder and an end to political violence on campuses. The Shaheed Moin Hossain Raju Sangsad, a memorial organisation in his name, continues to advocate for the trial of those responsible for his killing.

=== Anti Terrorism Raju Memorial Sculpture ===
In the years following Raju's death, his friends and fellow activists from the Bangladesh Students' Union initiated efforts to create a permanent memorial. The resulting Anti Terrorism Raju Memorial Sculpture (Bengali: সন্ত্রাস বিরোধী স্মারক রাজু ভাস্কর্য, Shontrash Birodhi Raju Sharokh Bhaskarjya) was designed by artists Shaymol Chowdhury and Gopal Paul and inaugurated on 17 September 1997 by then-Vice Chancellor Abul Kalam Azad Chowdhury, with the unveiling conducted by Justice Habibur Rahman. The sculpture depicts eight figures standing in solidarity with arms linked, modelled after specific individuals including Raju's elder brother Muneem Hossain Rana (representing Raju himself). It is located near the Teacher-Student Centre on Kazi Nazrul Islam Avenue.

The sculpture has served as a focal point for student movements and protests for over two decades, including during the 2018 Bangladesh quota reform movement and the 2024 Bangladesh quota reform movement, the latter of which contributed to significant political changes in Bangladesh. The memorial has occasionally been vandalised but has been consistently restored by students and activists who view it as a symbol of resistance against authoritarianism and institutional violence.
