= Socialist Party of Bangladesh (disambiguation) =

Socialist Party of Bangladesh may refer to one of a number of political parties in Bangladesh:

- Socialist Party of Bangladesh
- Socialist Party of Bangladesh (Marxist)

== See also ==
- List of socialist parties
