= Lucky Akter =

Bangladeshi student leader

- লাকী আক্তার

Former President of Bangladesh Students' Union (BSU)

Personal details
- Born: 3 October 1990 (age 36)
- Party: Communist Party of Bangladesh
- Education: Jagannath University
- Occupation: Student leader, politician

Lucky Akter (Bengali: লাকী আক্তার; born 3 October 1990) is a Bangladeshi student leader, political activist, politician and singer. She is a central committee member of the Communist Party of Bangladesh (CPB) and a former president of the Bangladesh Students' Union (BSU). She gained national attention during the Shahbag Movement in 2013 for leading protest slogans and mobilizing demonstrators.

== Early life and education ==
Akter was born on 3 October 1990 in Bangladesh. Her father Fazlul Hoque and mother Razia Begum. She completed her Secondary School Certificate (SSC) from K.B. Little School and Higher Secondary Certificate (HSC) from Milestone College. She later earned her BA and MA in English Language and Literature from Jagannath University. During her student life, she became involved in student activism and participated in several movements related to university policies and student rights. Her first major participation in student protest activities was during the 2009 movement demanding residential facilities for students at Jagannath University. She later joined campaigns against tuition fee increases, development fees, and other administrative decisions affecting students.

== Student activism ==
Akter became active in progressive student politics and joined the Bangladesh Students' Union, a left-leaning student organization affiliated with the Communist Party of Bangladesh. In 2013, she was elected general secretary of the Bangladesh Students' Union, becoming the first woman to hold the position in the organization's history. In 2015, she was elected president of the organization, becoming its third female president. During her leadership, she was involved in campaigns related to student rights, education policy, and social justice.

During her time as a student activist, Akter also took part in protests against sexual harassment, university administrative policies, and increased development fees imposed on students at Jagannath University.

=== Shahbag Movement ===
Akter received nationwide attention during the Shahbag Movement in 2013, a mass protest demanding justice for war crimes committed during the Bangladesh Liberation War of 1971. The protests began after the verdict against Jamaat-e-Islami leader Abdul Quader Molla sparked public demonstrations at Shahbag Square in Dhaka. As a young activist and student leader, Akter became widely known for leading slogans during the protests, which helped energize large crowds gathered at Shahbag. Her voice and role in slogan-leading became one of the recognizable elements of the movement.

During the protests, she also faced online harassment and threats from extremist groups. Reports indicated that activists involved in the movement, including Akter, were targeted through cyber harassment and intimidation campaigns. Akter also became ill during the prolonged demonstrations and was briefly admitted to hospital due to exhaustion after spending several days at the protest site.

== Political career ==
After her student leadership, Akter continued her political involvement with the Communist Party of Bangladesh. She later became a member of the party's central committee and remained active in left-wing political activities.

She has also been associated with the Bangladesh Krishak Samity (BKS), a peasant organization linked to the Communist Party of Bangladesh.

== Personal life ==
Lucky Akter is married to Zahidul Islam Sazib, formerly a student leader of Bangaldesh Students’ Union and currently the international affair's secretary of Bangladesh Youth Union. They are parenting a baby girl, Rojava Surjo. The couple brought the name Rojava from the Rojava Revolution.

== See also ==
- Bangladesh Students' Union
