= Shah Alam (CPB politician) =

Bangladeshi communist politician and freedom fighter

Mohammed Shah Alam
- মোহাম্মদ শাহ আলম

President of the Communist Party of Bangladesh
- In office 4 March 2022 – September 2025
- Preceded by: Mujahidul Islam Selim
- Succeeded by: Kazi Sajjad Zahir Chandan

Personal details
- Party: Communist Party of Bangladesh
- Profession: Politician

Mohammed Shah Alam, commonly known as Shah Alam, is a Bangladeshi politician, freedom fighter, wartime commander of the NAP–CPB–BSU Special Guerrilla Force, and senior leader of the Communist Party of Bangladesh (CPB). He served as the president of the CPB from 2022 to 2025 and is currently in the party's Central Committee. During his tenure as CPB President, Shah Alam oversaw various party programmes and issued public statements on issues relating to workers' rights, national sovereignty, and opposition to imperialism. He also represented the party in meetings with foreign diplomatic missions, including delegations from China and Vietnam.

== Political career ==
=== Participation in the Liberation Struggle ===
Shah Alam was involved in politics as a student and played a key role in the 1969 East Pakistan mass uprising. During the Bangladesh Liberation War, he fought as a freedom fighter and served as a commander of the NAP–Communist Party–Students' Union Special Guerrilla Forces (NAP–CPB–BSU), a left-wing guerrilla movement that operated against the genocidal Pakistan Army during the Bangladesh genocide.

=== Election as CPB General Secretary ===
Shah Alam served as CPB General Secretary from May 2017 to March 2022. During his tenure, he advocated for building an independent left-democratic political platform separate from both major parties, the Awami League and the Bangladesh Nationalist Party. Under his tenure, the Left Democratic Alliance (LDA) was founded on 18 July 2018. He criticized the ruling capitalist class for its authoritarian rule and widespread corruption, while putting importance to class struggle and environmentalism.

=== Election as CPB President ===
Shah Alam was elected President of the CPB on 4 March 2022 at a meeting of the party's Central Committee following its 12th Congress. He succeeded Mujahidul Islam Selim as part of the new leadership elected at the congress.

=== International Engagement ===
Shah Alam represented the CPB in meetings with foreign diplomatic missions. He met with the Chinese ambassador to discuss party‑to‑party relations and political cooperation. He also met with Vietnamese National Assembly Chairman Vương Đình Huệ during the latter's official visit to Bangladesh, where the two sides discussed party‑to‑party relations, bilateral cooperation, and future economic and political engagement. Shah Alam attended an event hosted by the Chinese Embassy in Bangladesh commemorating the 80th anniversary of the victory in the World Anti-Fascist War.

== Political positions ==
=== Opposition to foreign leasing of Chittagong Port ===
Shah Alam participated in protests organised by the CPB and Left Democratic Alliance (LDA) opposing government plans to lease parts of Chittagong Port to foreign companies. The CPB, LDA, and port workers staged demonstrations and symbolic blockades at the port and said that foreign control of key terminals would undermine national interests and threaten workers' rights. Alam supported the campaign's call for the government to withdraw the proposed lease agreements.

=== Workers' Rights ===
Shah Alam has criticised labour conditions in Bangladesh, especially workplace safety in hazardous industries. He said that repeated industrial accidents show failures in oversight and regulation, and blamed both authorities and factory owners for not ensuring proper safety measures. He called for stronger enforcement of labour laws, better safety standards, and greater accountability from employers.

=== Cuba ===
Shah Alam issued a message of solidarity with the Cuban people and government on behalf of the CPB. In the statement signed by Alam and CPB General Secretary Ruhin Hossain Prince, the party condemned the United States' economic, commercial and financial blockade on Cuba and called for its lifting. The CPB criticised the impact of the blockade over more than six decades, including its intensification during the COVID‑19 pandemic and Cuba's designation as a state sponsor of terrorism.

=== Palestine ===
Shah Alam issued statements expressing solidarity with the Palestinian people on behalf of the CPB and condemned Israeli military actions in the occupied Palestinian territories. He called for an immediate end to violence against civilians and urged the international community to uphold international law and protect Palestinian national rights. During a CPB rally in Dhaka held in response to the assault on Gaza, Alam criticised the attacks as a violation of the ceasefire, attributed responsibility to broader imperialist forces, and accused the United States and its regional allies of supporting the offensive. He reiterated the party's solidarity with the Palestinian people.
