= Pankaj Bhattacharya =

Bangladeshi freedom fighter

- পঙ্কজ ভট্টাচার্য
- Born: 6 August 1939; Noapara, Raozan Upazila, Chittagong District, Bengal Province, British India
- Died: 23 April 2023 (aged 83); Dhaka, Bangladesh
- Education: University of Dhaka
- Known for: Deputy commander of the NAP-Communist Party-Students Union Special Guerrilla Forces
- Political party: Oikya National Awami Party
- Other political affiliations: National Awami Party (Muzaffar); Gano Forum

Pankaj Bhattacharya (Bengali: পঙ্কজ ভট্টাচার্য; 6 August 1939 – 23 April 2023) was a left-wing politician and freedom fighter of the Bangladesh Liberation War. He was the president of the Oikya National Awami Party.

== Early life ==
Bhattacharya was born on 6 August 1939 in Noapara, Raozan Upazila, Chittagong District, Bengal Province, British India. He was expelled from Chattogram Collegiate School in 1959 for political activities. He was the vice-president and later president in 1962 of the central committee of the East Pakistan Students Union.

Bhattacharya studied the Bengali language at the University of Dhaka. He stayed at Jagannath Hall.

== Career ==
Bhattacharya was active in the movement against Pakistani President Ayub Khan in the 1960s. He was sent to jail in 1964. He was again arrested in 1967 and detained in the office of the Detective Branch in the Shadhin Bangla Conspiracy Case in 1967. He was kept in prison with Sheikh Mujibur Rahman for 19 days. Mujib asked the prison authorities to open the main gate of the prison after Bhattacharya was released so that he would not have to bow his head on the way out through the small gate. He joined National Awami Party with Matia Chowdhury.

Bhattacharya was the deputy commander of the NAP-Communist Party-Students Union Special Guerrilla Forces in the Bangladesh Liberation War in 1971.

Bhattacharya was a leader of the National Awami Party (Muzaffar). He provided aid during the Bangladesh famine of 1974. He joined Gano Forum in the 1993 as a founding presidium member under Dr. Kamal Hossain. He founded Shamajik Andalan as an outlet for progressive and democratic voices.

Bhattacharya founded the Oikya National Awami Party in 2010.

Bhattacharya published his memoirs Amar Sei Sab Din in 2023.

== Personal life ==
Bhattacharya was married to Rakhi Das Puraykayastha (died April 2022).

== Death ==
Bhattacharya died on 23 April 2023 at the Health and Hope Hospital, Dhaka, Bangladesh. Prime Minister Sheikh Hasina sent condolences following his death. His body was kept at the Shaheed Minar where people, including Hasan Mahmud, Kamal Hossain, Mohammad Akhtaruzzaman, Nurul Islam Nahid, Rashed Khan Menon, Zonayed Saki, paid their respects.
