= Amina Ahmed =

Bangladeshi politician

Member of Bangladesh Parliament
- In office 10 April 2014 – 30 December 2018

Personal details
- Party: Bangladesh Awami League

Amina Ahmed (Bengali: হোছনে আরা বেগম) is a Bangladesh Awami League politician and a former member of parliament from a reserved seat.

== Career ==
Ahmed was elected to parliament from a reserved seat as a Bangladesh Awami League candidate in 2014.

== Early life ==
Ahmed is married to Professor Mozzaffar Ahmad, president of the Bangladesh National Awami Party.
