= 1988 Bangladeshi general election =

- 3 March 1988

All 300 seats in the Jatiya Sangsad 151 seats needed for a majority
- Turnout: 52.48% (▼8.62pp)
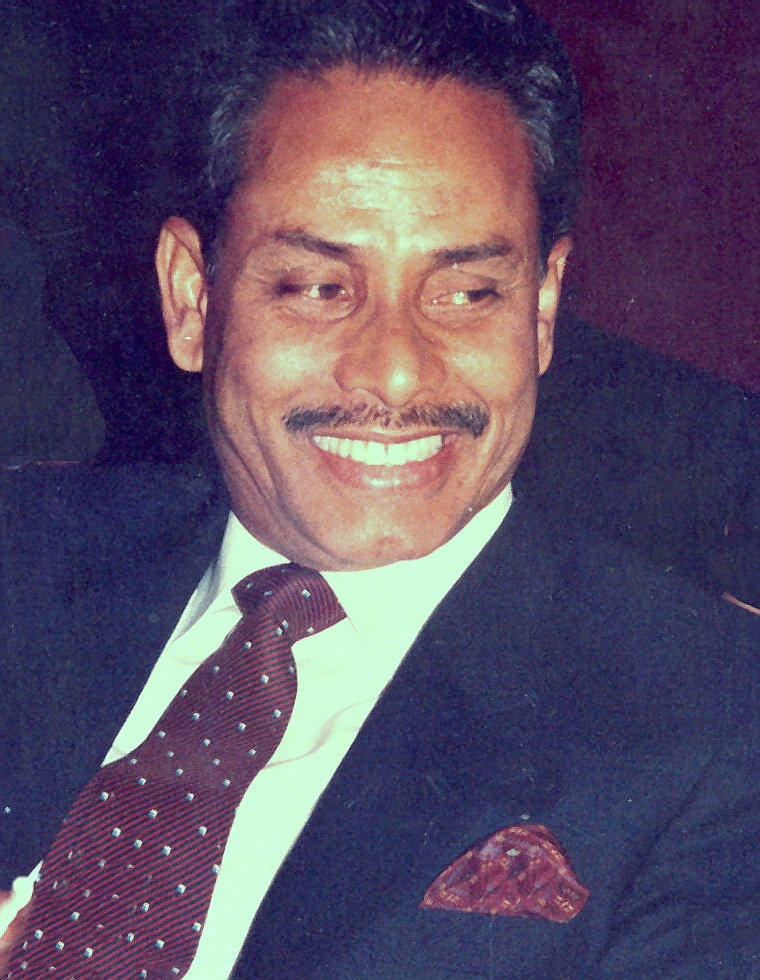

	First party	Second party
Leader	H. M. Ershad	A. S. M. Abdur Rab
Party	JP(E)	Combined Opposition Party
Last election	153 seats	–
Seats won	251	19
Seat change	▲98	New
Popular vote	17,680,133	3,263,340
Percentage	68.44%	12.63%
Prime Minister before election
Mizanur Rahman Chowdhury
JP(E)
Subsequent Prime Minister
Moudud Ahmed
JP(E)

General elections were held in Bangladesh on 3 March 1988. They were boycotted by several major parties, including the Bangladesh Awami League, the Bangladesh Nationalist Party, the Communist Party of Bangladesh, Jamaat-e-Islami Bangladesh, the Bangladesh Krishak Sramik Awami League, the National Awami Party (Muzaffar) and the Workers Party of Bangladesh. The result was a victory for the Jatiya Party, which won 251 of the 300 seats. Voter turnout was 52%.

== Background ==
In 1982 a coup d'état led by Army Chief Hussain Muhammad Ershad overthrew democratically elected president Abdus Sattar. Parliament was dissolved and all political parties were banned. Ershad assumed the presidency in December 1983, promising to hold presidential elections in May 1984 and to restore parliamentary government the following year. However, neither elections were held until 1986.

Amid increasing opposition from the general public, Ershad aimed to legitimise his regime by holding a referendum in March 1985. The official result of the referendum was overwhelmingly in support of his regime; however, there were allegations of large-scale vote rigging.

Ershad planned to hold a presidential election in early 1986, but faced vigorous opposition from the Awami League and the Bangladesh Nationalist Party (BNP), who demanded the lifting of martial law and the holding of parliamentary elections prior to a presidential election. On 1 January 1986 Ershad formed Jatiya Party to represent his interests in elections and, conceding to opposition demands, parliamentary elections were held on 7 May 1986 with the result as a victory for Ershad's Jatiya Party. However the result was controversial with a British team of observers terming the elections a "tragedy for democracy" and a "cynically frustrated exercise".

Ershad resigned as Chief of Army Staff on 30 August 1986 and, with the approval of the new parliament, a presidential election was held on 15 October 1986. However, the election was boycotted by all major opposition party candidates, giving Ershad a landslide victory, amid reports of electoral irregularities.

In November 1986, parliament passed the constitution's seventh amendment bill, protecting Ershad and his regime from prosecution for actions taken under his years of military rule, and on 11 November martial law was lifted.

In July 1987 opposition groups united and organised mass public demonstrations in Dhaka, Chittagong, and Khulna. Following Ershad's orders, police fired on participating protesters, resulting in civilian casualties, and police arrested as many as 500 protesters across the country. On 24 July Workers-Employees United Council began a 54-hour general strike in Dhaka calling for Ershad's resignation – the longest general strike in Bangladesh's history. Opposition groups planned a series of events that would begin 10 November, naming the action the "Siege of Dhaka". However, in efforts to prevent a 72-hour strike planned for 29 November Ershad declared a state of emergency on 27 November 1987.

Parliament was dissolved on 6 December and new parliamentary elections were scheduled for 3 March 1988. Despite all major opposition parties refusing to participate the elections went ahead.

The law providing for 30 seats reserved for women had expired prior to the elections.

== Results ==
Ershad's Jatiya Party won 251 of the 300 seats. The remaining 49 seats were shared between three other political parties which did participate, as well as a number of independent candidates. The election was described by one Western diplomat as "a mockery of an election."

Party	Votes	%	Seats	+/–
Jatiya Party	17,680,133	68.44	251	+98
Combined Opposition Party	3,263,340	12.63	19	New
Bangladesh Freedom Party	850,284	3.29	2	New
Jatiya Samajtantrik Dal (Siraj)	309,666	1.20	3	0
Bangladesh Khilafat Andolan	105,910	0.41	0	0
23-Party Alliance	102,930	0.40	0	New
Jana Dal	28,929	0.11	0	0
Ganatantra Bastabayan Party	4,209	0.02	0	New
Independents	3,487,457	13.50	25	–7
Total	25,832,858	100.00	300	0
Source: Nohlen, Government of Bangladesh

== Aftermath ==
The fourth parliament passed a large number of legislative bills, including the controversial eighth amendment to the Constitution, which made Islam the state religion of Bangladesh, in contravention of the original secular nature of the Constitution.

In 1990 a popular mass uprising led by future Prime Ministers Khaleda Zia and Sheikh Hasina led to Ershad resigning from the Presidency, and the country returning to parliamentary democracy, with the Office of the President becoming a largely ceremonial one.
