= Anti Terrorism Raju Memorial Sculpture =

1997 sculpture in Dhaka, Bangladesh

- সন্ত্রাস বিরোধী স্মারক রাজু ভাস্কর্য (Bengali)
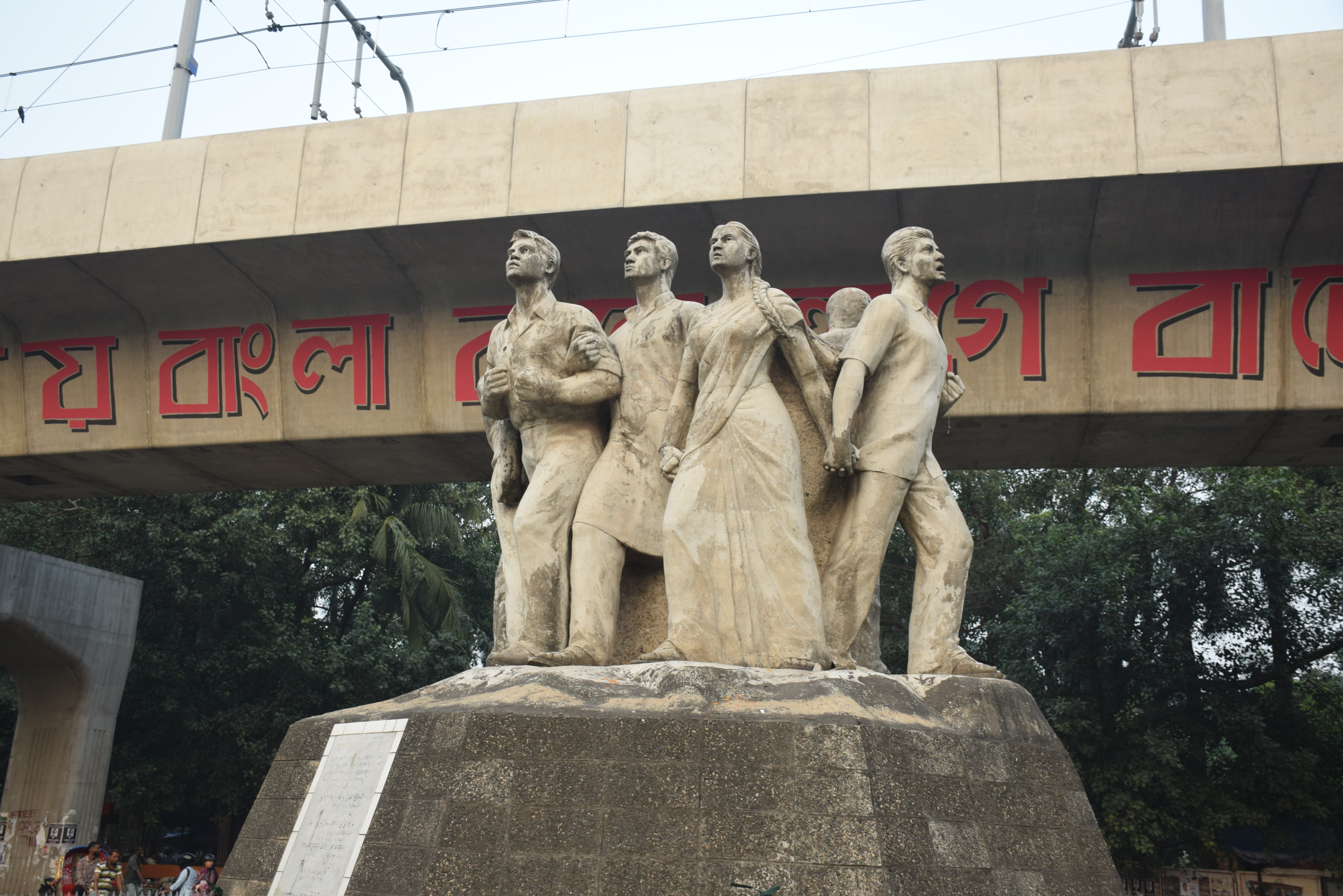
- Artists: Shaymol Chowdhury and Gopal Paul
- Year: 17 September 1997
- Type: Sculpture
- Subject: Moin Hossain Raju
- Location: Teacher-Student Centre, University of Dhaka, Kazi Nazrul Islam Avenue, Dhaka, Bangladesh; 23°43′57.1″N 90°23′44.4″E

Anti Terrorism Raju Memorial Sculpture (Bengali: সন্ত্রাস বিরোধী স্মারক রাজু ভাস্কর্য Shontrash Birodhi Raju Sharokh Bhaskarjya) is a sculpture located in University of Dhaka campus of Bangladesh. It is dedicated to the memory of a student of Dhaka University named Moin Hossain Raju, an activist of Bangladesh Students' Union who was killed during a clash between Chhatra League and Chhatra Dal at Dhaka University on 13 March 1992. The sculpture was created by Shaymol Chowdhury in 1997.

== Background ==
Moin Hossain Raju (29 July 1968 – 13 March 1992) was a student in the Department of Soil, Water and Environment at the University of Dhaka who lived in Room 122 of Dr. Muhammad Shahidullah Hall. He served as a member of the Central Committee of the Bangladesh Students' Union and as Social Welfare Secretary of both the Bangladesh Students' Union's Dhaka University branch and the Dhaka University Central Students' Union. Born in Mehendiganj Upazila, Barisal, to Moazzem Hossain and Khadija Begum, Raju became involved in politics with the Bangladesh Students' Union after arriving in Dhaka in 1987 following his higher secondary education. He played active roles during the anti-autocratic agitations of 1990 against the Ershad regime.

Beyond his political activities, Raju was known for his humanitarian approach and founded the Progga Coaching Center to provide low-cost academic support to financially disadvantaged students. He was also fond of poetry, particularly the works of Jibanananda Das, and had an interest in painting, often carrying art supplies and handwritten poetry notes in his bag.

On 13 March 1992, during violent confrontations between armed activists of Bangladesh Chhatra League and Jatiyatabadi Chhatra Dal on campus, Raju organized a peaceful demonstration by the Democratic Student Unity group, an alliance of eight left-wing student organizations, to protest what they termed "campus terrorism." The demonstration began when police fired tear gas indiscriminately at general students gathered near the Teacher-Student Centre, despite armed activists from both major student wings continuing to fire weapons. When a police officer ordered the peaceful protesters to disperse, Raju confronted him about the police's inaction against the armed groups. He then initiated a protest march with fellow students, linking arms in the same formation later depicted in the memorial sculpture. While leading this march near the Teacher-Student Centre area, only 100 yards from the vice-chancellor's residence, he was shot in the head by gunmen and died at 10:30 PM that night at Dhaka Medical College and Hospital.

== Construction and design ==
Following Raju's death, his friends and fellow activists from the Bangladesh Students' Union initiated efforts to create a memorial. The sculpture was designed by artists Shaymol Chowdhury and Gopal Paul and depicts eight figures representing students standing together in solidarity with arms linked. The eight figures were modeled after specific individuals: Muneem Hossain Rana (Raju's elder brother, representing Raju himself), Shahana Akhter Shilu, Saeed Hasan Tuhin, Abdullah Mahmud Khan (who was standing beside Raju when he was shot), Tasfir Siddiq, Hasan Hafizur Rahman Sohel, Utpal Chandra Roy, and Golam Kibria Roni.

The sculpture was financed by Atauddin Khan, a former teacher of the University of Dhaka, and Lion Nazrul Islam Khan Badal, with construction costs reaching approximately 2 million taka. Work began in late 1995 at the Communist Party office and took over a year to complete. Shaymol Chowdhury worked without payment due to his commitment to the cause and his affiliation with the Bangladesh Students' Union. Despite initial objections from Dhaka City Corporation regarding its placement on a public road, the sculpture was installed with permission from University of Dhaka authorities. It was inaugurated by then-Vice Chancellor Abul Kalam Azad Chowdhury on 17 September 1997, with the unveiling ceremony conducted by Justice Habibur Rahman.

== Legacy ==
The sculpture has served as a focal point for student movements and protests at the University of Dhaka for over two decades. It has been the site of gatherings during various student movements, including the 2018 Bangladesh quota reform movement and the 2024 Bangladesh quota reform movement that led to significant political changes in Bangladesh. During the July-August 2024 student-people's uprising that resulted in the fall of the Awami League government, many key programs were held at the sculpture's base. The memorial has occasionally been vandalized but has been consistently restored by students and activists who view it as a symbol of resistance against authoritarianism and violence in educational institutions. Annual commemorative events are held at the sculpture on 13 March, with leaders and activists from various student organizations placing wreaths to honor Raju's sacrifice.
