= Workers Party (Reconstituted) of Bangladesh =

Workers Party (Reconstituted) of Bangladesh বাংলাদেশের পুনর্গঠিত ওয়ার্কার্স পার্টি
- Founder: Abdus Sattar
- Dissolved: 2013
- Preceded by: Workers Party of Bangladesh
- Merged into: United Communist League of Bangladesh
- Headquarters: Dhaka
- Ideology: Communism; Marxism–Leninism

Party flag

The Workers Party (Reconstituted) of Bangladesh was a political party in Bangladesh. Abdus Sattar is the general secretary of the party. It merged into the United Communist League of Bangladesh in 2013.
