= Nepal Nag =

Bengali politician

- নেপাল নাগ
- Born: 19 September 1909; Tejgaon, Dhaka, British India (present-day Bangladesh)
- Died: 4 October 1978 (aged 69); Dargah Road, Kolkata, India
- Education: Intermediate of Arts
- Occupation: Politician
- Notable work: History of the Communist Party in Dhaka District and Immortal Lenin
- Political party: Communist Party of India before independence, Communist Party of Bangladesh after independence
- Movement: Indian independence movement Swadeshi movement
- Spouse: Nibedita Nag

Nepal Nag (Bengali: নেপাল নাগ; 19 September 1909 - 5 October 1978) also known as Nepalchandra Nag was a Bengali communist figure in the Indian independence movement and Swadeshi movement.

== Early life ==
Nag was born in Tejgaon, Dhaka. His father was Suresh Chandra Nag. Although his given name was Shailesh Chandra, he was commonly known as Nepal. From an early age he embraced Swadeshi ideas, and after passing the Intermediate of Arts examination he became active in revolutionary activities.

== Revolutionary movement ==
In 1923, Nag joined Leela Roy's Srisangha, a nationalist organisation of undivided Bengal, and began participating in the revolutionary movement after completing high school. Nag was first arrested on 21 April 1932 and was sent to Deuli prison camp for seven years, where he took part in Communist consolidation and was attracted to the ideology of Marxism by a senior revolutionary, Rebati Barman. After his release in 1938, he joined the Communist Party of India.

After the Partition of India in 1947, he secretly led the East Pakistan Provincial Communist Party under the pseudonym "Rahman Bhai" from 1947 to 1972. He was the founder of the trade union movement of Narayanganj. Thereafter, Nag became the General Secretary of East Pakistan Provincial Communist Party and represented the party at the 1970 World Communist Conference in Moscow. He also represented the Communist Party of East Pakistan at the 22nd Congress of the Communist Party of Russia in 1971. He posthumously received the Friends of Liberation War Award in 2012 from the Bangladesh government.
