= 1986 Bangladeshi general election =

- 7 May 1986

300 of the 330 seats in the Jatiya Sangsad 151 seats needed for a majority
- Registered: 47,305,886
- Turnout: 61.10% (▲9.81pp)
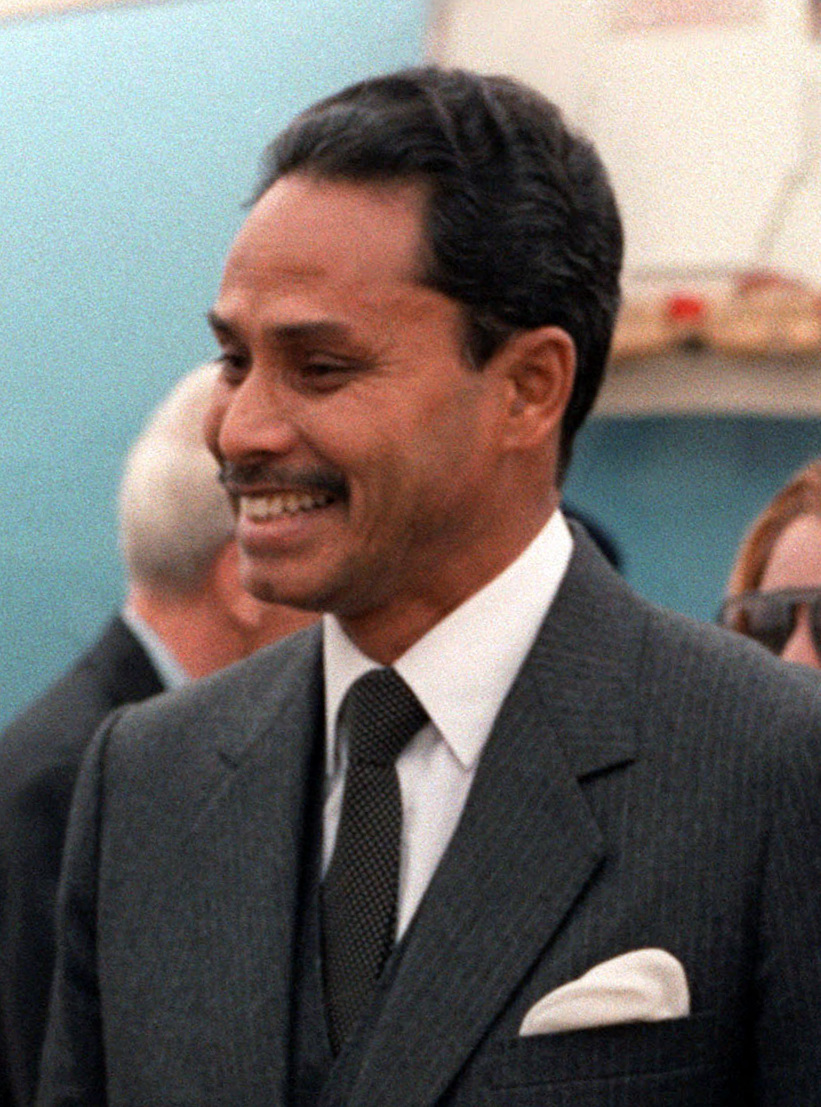

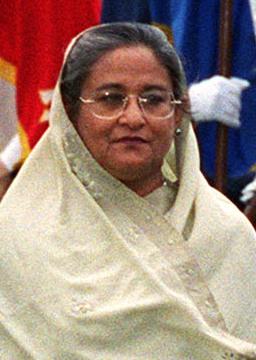
	First party	Second party
Leader	H. M. Ershad	Sheikh Hasina
Party	JP(E)	AL
Leader's seat	Did not contest	Dhaka-10
Last election	–	54 seats
Seats won	153	76
Seat change	New	▲37
Popular vote	12,079,259	7,462,157
Percentage	42.34%	26.16%
- Results by constituency
Prime minister before election
Post vacant
Prime Minister after election
Mizanur Rahman Chowdhury
JP(E)

General elections were held in Bangladesh on 7 May 1986. A total of 1,527 candidates contested the elections. The result was a victory for the Jatiya Party, which won 153 of the 300 directly elected seats. Voter turnout was 61%. Bangladesh Nationalist Party, the winner of the previous elections, boycotted the election.

British observers including a journalist termed the elections a "tragedy for democracy" and a "cynically frustrated exercise".

== Background ==
In 1982 a coup d'état led by Army Chief Hussain Muhammad Ershad overthrew democratically elected President Abdus Sattar, suspended the Constitution and imposed martial law. Parliament was dissolved and all political parties and activities were banned. Ershad appointed Justice A. F. M. Ahsanuddin Chowdhury as President on 27 March 1982, a position which he held until December 1983 when Ershad assumed the presidency himself. In 1983 Ershad promised to hold presidential elections in May 1984 and to restore parliamentary government the following year. However, neither elections were held until 1986.

Amid increasing opposition from the general public, Ershad aimed to legitimise his regime by holding a referendum in March 1985. The official result of the referendum was overwhelmingly in support of his regime; however, there were allegations of large-scale vote rigging.

Ershad planned to hold a presidential election in early 1986 but was faced with vigorous opposition from the Bangladesh Awami League-led eight-party alliance, Bangladesh Nationalist Party-backed seven-party alliance and the left-leaning five-party alliance, who demanded the lifting of martial law and the holding of parliamentary elections prior to a presidential election. Conceding to opposition demands general elections were scheduled for 7 May 1986.

On 1 January 1986 Ershad formed Jatiya Party to represent his interests in the elections. The winner of the previous elections, the BNP, boycotted the elections but the Awami League and the majority of other political parties contested. At the time of elections martial law was still in place and Ershad was still Army Chief.

== Results ==
The result was a victory for Ershad's Jatiya Party, which won a simple parliamentary majority with 153 of 300 seats. However, the result was controversial, with Awami League accusing the Jatiya Party of election rigging and a British team of observers - consisting of a former Labour Party minister, a Conservative Party lawmaker and a BBC journalist - terming the elections a "tragedy for democracy" and a "cynically frustrated exercise".

Party	Votes	%	Seats			
Party	Votes	%	General	Women	Total	+/–
Jatiya Party	12,079,259	42.34	153	30	183	New
Awami League	7,462,157	26.16	76	0	76	+37
Bangladesh Jamaat-e-Islami	1,314,057	4.61	10	0	10	New
Jatiya Samajtantrik Dal (Rab)	725,303	2.54	4	0	4	New
Bangladesh Muslim League	412,765	1.45	4	0	4	+4
Oikya National Awami Party	369,824	1.30	5	0	5	+5
Communist Party of Bangladesh	259,728	0.91	5	0	5	+5
Jatiya Samajtantrik Dal (Siraj)	248,705	0.87	3	0	3	New
National Awami Party (Muzaffar)	202,520	0.71	2	0	2	+1
Bangladesh Krishak Sramik Awami League	191,107	0.67	3	0	3	New
Workers Party of Bangladesh	151,828	0.53	3	0	3	New
Bangladesh Khilafat Andolan	123,306	0.43	0	0	0	New
Jana Dal	98,100	0.34	0	0	0	New
Bangladesh Nagarik Sanghati	68,290	0.24	0	0	0	New
Islami Jukta Front	50,509	0.18	0	0	0	New
Jatiya Janata Party (Odud)	46,704	0.16	0	0	0	New
Bangladesh Samyabadi Dal (M-L)	36,944	0.13	0	0	0	New
Gano Azadi League	23,632	0.08	0	0	0	0
Bangladesh Islamic Andolan	22,931	0.08	0	0	0	New
Jamaaiatay Olamaya Islam	5,676	0.02	0	0	0	New
Jamaaiatay Olamaya Islam-Nizam-e-Islam Party	5,572	0.02	0	0	0	New
Pragotishil Jatiyatabadi Dal	2,997	0.01	0	0	0	New
Jatiya Janata Party (Sujat)	1,988	0.01	0	0	0	New
Bangladesh Jayita League	1,985	0.01	0	0	0	–2
Bangladesh Hindu Oikkya Front	1,338	0.00	0	0	0	New
Jatiyatabadi Ganatantrik Dal	149	0.00	0	0	0	0
Young Muslim Society	141	0.00	0	0	0	New
Bangladesh Islamic Republican Party	110	0.00	0	0	0	New
Independents	4,619,025	16.19	32	0	32	+16
Total	28,526,650	100.00	300	30	330	0
Valid votes	28,526,650	98.69				
Invalid/blank votes	377,209	1.31				
Total votes	28,903,859	100.00				
Registered voters/turnout	47,305,886	61.10				
Source: Nohlen et al., IPU, Government of Bangladesh

== Aftermath ==
In August 1986 Ershad resigned from military service and a presidential election was held in October 1986, in which Ershad was declared victorious. However the elections were controversial as they were boycotted by all major opposition candidates and there were reports of irregularities.

In November 1986 the second session of the third parliament was used for passing the constitution's seventh amendment bill, which primarily protected Ershad and his regime from prosecution for actions taken under his years of military rule, and on 11 November martial law was lifted.

In July 1987 the opposition parties united in opposition of government policies. Ershad declared a state of emergency in November, dissolved parliament in December, and scheduled new parliamentary elections for March 1988.
