= Democratic United Front =

Political alliance in Bangladesh

Democratic United Front গণতান্ত্রিক যুক্ত ফ্রন্ট
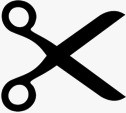
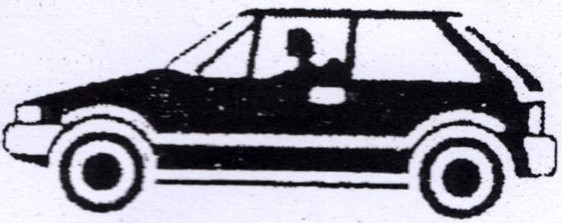
- গণতান্ত্রিক যুক্ত ফ্রন্ট; Democratic United Front
- Abbreviation: DUF
- Leader: Kazi Sajjad Zahir Chandan (CPB)
- Coordinator: Bazlur Rashid Firoz (SPB)
- Founded: 29 November 2025
- Ideology: Communism; Marxism–Leninism; Anti-imperialism; Secularism (Bangladeshi); Factions: Democratic socialism Maoism; Anti-revisionism; Shibdas Ghosh Thought
- Political position: Left-wing to far-left
- Slogan: দুনিয়ার মজদুর, এক হও! ("Workers of the world, unite!")

The Democratic United Front (Note: also known as Ganatantrik Jukta Front) (Bengali: গণতান্ত্রিক যুক্ত ফ্রন্ট) is a coalition of ten left-wing political parties in Bangladesh. It was formed on 29 November 2025. Four of the member parties – the Communist Party of Bangladesh, Socialist Party of Bangladesh, Socialist Party of Bangladesh (Marxist), and the Bangladesh Jatiya Samajtantrik Dal – are registered with the Bangladesh Election Commission. The remaining six parties are unregistered.

== History ==
The Democratic United Front was announced at a national convention held at the Institution of Engineers, Bangladesh, jointly organized by the Left Democratic Alliance and Bangladesh JASAD. The declaration emphasized the need for a new political alignment in response to corruption, misgovernance, and the unfulfilled aspirations of the 2024 mass uprising.

The convention adopted a seven‑point political proposal outlining the coalition's ideological commitments and electoral strategy. Leaders called for uniting left‑wing, progressive, democratic, and pro–Liberation War forces.

The DUF declared their electoral manifesto on 23 January 2026, where emphasis were placed on the freedom of speech and expression, literary, cultural and democratic ambitions, development of youth power, and reorganization of educational system.

== Member Parties ==
The Democratic United Front currently consists of ten political parties.

=== Registered Parties ===
| Party | Ideology | Symbol |
|---|---|---|
| Communist Party of Bangladesh বাংলাদেশের কমিউনিস্ট পার্টি | Marxism–Leninism; Anti-imperialism | |
| Socialist Party of Bangladesh বাংলাদেশের সমাজতান্ত্রিক দল | Marxism–Leninism–Maoism; Anti-revisionism; Anti-imperialism | |
| Socialist Party of Bangladesh (Marxist) বাংলাদেশের সমাজতান্ত্রিক দল (মার্কসবাদী) | Shibdas Ghosh thought Anti-revisionism; Anti-imperialism | |
| Bangladesh Jatiya Samajtantrik Dal বাংলাদেশ জাতীয় সমাজতান্ত্রিক দল | Democratic socialism Progressivism; Anti-imperialism | |

=== Unregistered parties ===
| Party | Ideology |
|---|---|
| Revolutionary Communist League of Bangladesh বাংলাদেশের বিপ্লবী কমিউনিস্ট লীগ | Marxism–Leninism; Anti-imperialism |
| Democratic Revolutionary Party গণতান্ত্রিক বিপ্লবী পার্টি | Marxism–Leninism; Anti-imperialism |
| Socialist Movement of Bangladesh বাংলাদেশ সমাজতান্ত্রিক আন্দোলন | Marxism–Leninism; Anti-imperialism |
| Oikya National Awami Party ন্যাশনাল আওয়ামী পার্টি | Democratic socialism Anti-imperialism |
| Socialist Party of Bangladesh (Mahbub) বাংলাদেশের সমাজতান্ত্রিক দল (মাহবুব) | Marxism–Leninism; Anti-imperialism |
| Sonar Bangla Party সোনার বাংলা পার্টি | Anti-imperialism |

== Political Activities ==
=== Meeting with BNP ===
On 5 January 2026, DUF leaders met BNP acting chairman Tarique Rahman in Gulshan after expressing condolences for Khaleda Zia. They discussed the political situation and the upcoming election, with both sides emphasising the importance of the Bangladesh Liberation War. DUF leaders urged the BNP to prevent groups that opposed the Liberation War and independence of Bangladesh from gaining influence. They also accused the Awami League of exploiting the Liberation War for political gain. They added that they would remain critical if the BNP returned to power.

=== Opposition to foreign leasing of Chittagong Port ===
The DUF and allied left‑wing groups led protests and strikes against proposals to lease the New Mooring Container Terminal (NCT) at Chittagong Port to foreign operators, because it threatened national sovereignty, security, and a valuable state asset.

In a rally at the National Press Club chaired by Bazlur Rashid Firoz and attended by leaders from the DUF, protesters demanded an immediate halt to leasing, cancellation of related agreements for terminals such as Laldiachar and Pangao, and nationwide resistance to the imperialist encroachment.

They warned that leasing the port adjacent to naval, refinery, and airport facilities to firms like DP World posed a security risk by allowing foreign naval access and regional surveillance.

They said the NCT is a profitable, domestically funded terminal that generates substantial revenue and should not be handed to foreign firms. The campaign also linked the issue to wider criticism of the interim government for alleged secret deals with the United States, economic mismanagement, and failures on labour and inequality issues, and called for united resistance.

== See also ==
- Left Democratic Alliance (Bangladesh)
- United Front (East Pakistan)
- Left Front (West Bengal)
- Politics of Bangladesh
