= Samajtantrik Sramik Front =

Trade Union Federation in Bangladesh

SSF
- Samajtantrik Sramik Front (Socialist Labour Front - SLF)
- সমাজতান্ত্রিক শ্রমিক ফ্রন্ট
- Headquarters: 23/2 Topkhana Road (2nd floor); Dhaka
- Location: Bangladesh
- Members: 2,285 (2003)
- Key people: Razequzzaman Ratan, president S.M. Ahasan Habib (Bulbul), general secretary
- Affiliations: WFTU

The Samajtantrik Sramik Front (Bengali: সমাজতান্ত্রিক শ্রমিক ফ্রন্ট, Socialist Labour Front - SLF) is a national trade union federation in Bangladesh. It is affiliated with the World Federation of Trade Unions.

SSF is politically tied to the Socialist Party of Bangladesh.
