= Weekly Ekota =

Weekly newspaper in Bangladesh

- Type: Weekly newspaper
- Founder: Bazlur Rahman
- Founded: July 31, 1970; 56 years ago
- Relaunched: September 6, 1981; 45 years ago
- Political alignment: Left-wing politics Communism
- Language: Bengali
- Country: Bangladesh
- Website: weeklyekota.net

Weekly Ekota (Bengali: সাপ্তাহিক একতা, lit. 'Weekly Unity') is a weekly newspaper of Bangladesh. It is affiliated with the Communist Party of Bangladesh (CPB).

== History ==
On 31 July 1970, Weekly Ekota began its journey as the mouthpiece of the Communist Party of East Pakistan, Journalist Bazlur Rahman was the founding editor of the weekly publication.

On 26 March 1971, after the beginning of Operation Searchlight and the Bangladesh War of Independence, Publication of weekly Ekota was temporarily stopped and as a replacement, a newspaper named 'Muktijoddha' became the mouthpiece of the Communist Party of East Pakistan.

In February 1972, publication of Weekly Ekota was resumed after the independence of Bangladesh.

On 1975, publication of Ekota was again paused after Sheikh Mujibur Rahman banned all newspapers except 4 pro-government publications and established a one-party state and dictatorship (BAKSaL).

On 2 February 1979, publication of Weekly Ekota was again resumed when Bangladesh was under rule of Ziaur Rahman and closed newspapers were again being opened.

On 6 September 1981, Weekly Ekota was relaunched as the mouthpiece of the Communist Party of Bangladesh (CPB).

In 1986, after the general election, Hussain Muhammad Ershad gave orders to close the newspaper for 1 year and 3 months, but Ekota resumed its publication in March 1987 and was involved in the anti-Ershad movement.

In the early 1990s, publication of Ekota was again paused, but the publication of the newspaper resumed again in 1996.

== Ideology ==
The newspaper is left-leaning, supportive of left-wing ideologies, communism and the mouthpiece of the Communist Party of Bangladesh (CPB).
