= Anil Mukherjee =

Bangladeshi communist leader and freedom fighter

- অনিল মুখার্জি
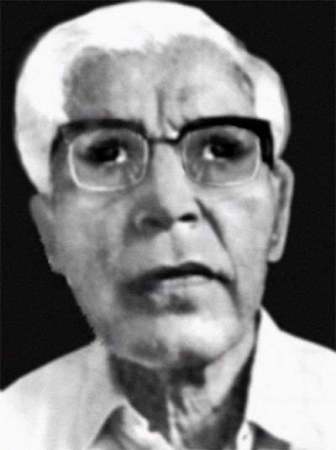
- Born: 10 October 1912; Munshiganj, British Raj, (present‑day Munshiganj, Munshiganj District, Bangladesh)
- Died: 7 February 1982 (aged 69); Dhaka, Bangladesh
- Citizenship: British subject (1912–1947); Pakistan (1947–1971); Bangladesh
- Occupations: Writer, Politician
- Notable work: Introduction to Communism, Background of independent Bangladesh struggle
- Political party: Communist Party of India (until 1947), Communist Party of East Pakistan (1947–1971), Communist Party of Bangladesh (since 1971)
- Movement: Communism; Indian independence movement

Anil Mukherjee (Bengali: অনিল মুখার্জি; 10 October 1912 – 7 February 1982) was a Bangladeshi communist politician and writer. He was one of the leading figures of the communist movement in the British Raj, Pakistan (East Pakistan), and Bangladesh. He actively participated in the Bangladesh Liberation War in 1971.

== Birth ==
Mukherjee was born on 10 October 1912 in Munshiganj District, Bengal Presidency (now in Bangladesh).

== Independence struggle ==
In 1930, while studying in college, he was imprisoned for participating in the Civil Disobedience Movement. During his confinement in the Midnapore Jail, the British authorities accused him of involvement in an armed revolutionary plot and subsequently transferred him to the Cellular Jail in the Andaman Islands.

== Communist Party ==
He was released from prison in 1938 and subsequently joined the Communist Party of India. In 1946, he played a notable role in the jute mill workers’ strike in Narayanganj. After the partition of India, he was imprisoned in East Pakistan for eight years. Even after his release, he was forced to remain in hiding until 1971 due to his involvement in political activities. During this period, he secretly traveled to Moscow and represented the Communist Party of East Pakistan at seventy‑five party conferences. In 1971 he took an active part in the Bangladesh Liberation War. He was elected secretary of the Central Committee of the Communist Party of Bangladesh in 1973 and again in 1980.

== Literary Works ==
- সাম্যবাদের ভূমিকা, The role of communism
- শ্রমিক আন্দোলনের হাতে খড়ি, The beginnings of the labor movement
- স্বাধীন বাংলাদেশ সংগ্রামের পটভূমি ও, Background and history of the Bangladesh independence struggle
- হারানো খোকা, Lost Child
