= 1985 Bangladeshi military rule referendum =

- 21 March 1985
- Do you support the policies of President Ershad, and do you want him to continue to run this administration until a civilian government is formed through elections?

Results
Choice	Votes	%
Yes	32,661,233	94.47%
No	1,911,281	5.53%

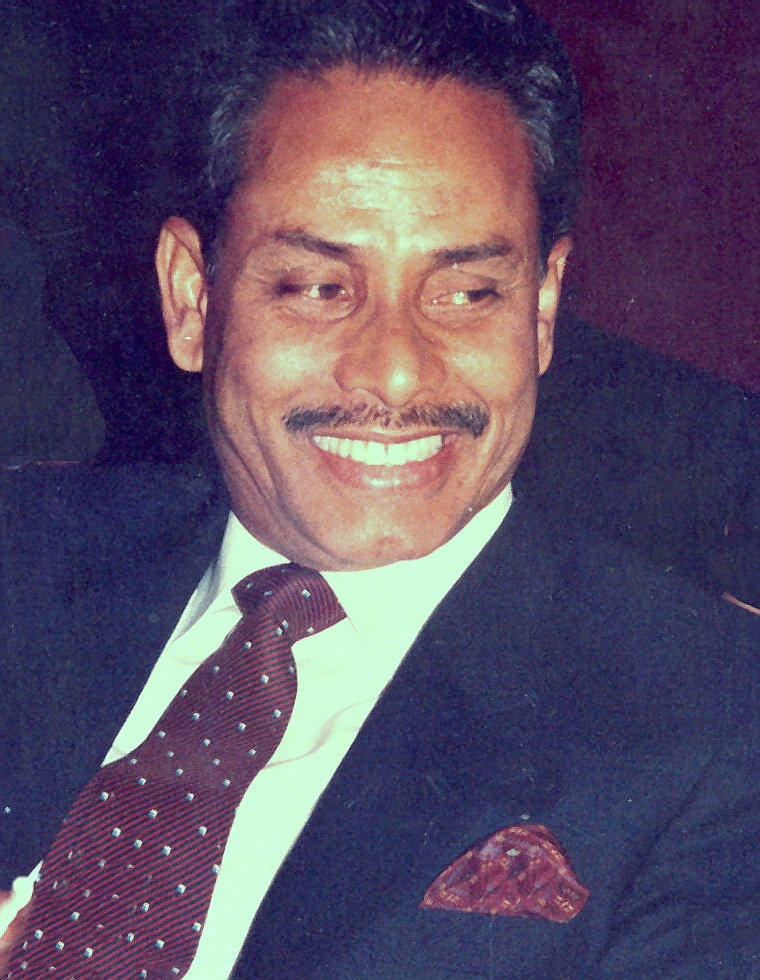
Hussain Muhammad Ershad, President of People's Republic of Bangladesh.

A referendum on military rule was held in Bangladesh on 21 March 1985 to seek public approval for the continuation of military rule under Lieutenant General Hussain Muhammad Ershad, who had seized power in a bloodless coup in 1982. The referendum asked voters "Do you support the policies of President Ershad, and do you want him to continue to run this administration until a civilian government is formed through elections?"

The result saw 94% vote in favour with a turnout of 72%. The opposition organised a general strike on the day of the referendum, and alleged that the results were fraudulent.

== Background ==
In 1982, a coup d'état led by Chief of Army Staff Lieutenant General Hussain Muhammad Ershad overthrew democratically elected president Abdus Sattar, suspended the Constitution and imposed martial law. Parliament was dissolved and all political parties were banned. Ershad appointed Justice A. F. M. Ahsanuddin Chowdhury as President on 27 March 1982, a position which he held until December 1983 when Ershad assumed the presidency himself. In 1983 Ershad promised to hold presidential elections in May 1984 and to restore parliamentary government the following year. However, neither elections were held within the stated time.

Amid increasing opposition from the general public, Ershad aimed to legitimise his regime by holding a referendum in March 1985. Voters were asked "Do you support the policies of President Ershad, and do you want him to continue to run this administration until a civilian government is formed through elections?"

The opposition organised a general strike on the day of the referendum.

== Results ==
The official result of the referendum was overwhelmingly in support of his regime, which saw 94.5% vote in favour, with a turnout of 72.2%. However, there were allegations of large-scale vote rigging, and a 2000 report by the Bangladesh Institute of Parliamentary Studies noted that "many local and foreign observers found the figure inflated and claimed that the turnout was not more than 15 to 20 percent."

Choice	Votes	%
For	32,661,233	94.47
Against	1,911,281	5.53
Total	34,572,514	100.00
Registered voters/turnout	47,910,964	–
Source: Nohlen et al.

== Aftermath ==
Parliamentary elections were held on 7 May 1986, which saw a victory for Ershad's newly formed Jatiya Party. However the result was controversial, with a British team of observers terming the elections a "tragedy for democracy" and a "cynically frustrated exercise". Subsequently, presidential elections were held on 15 October 1986, which were boycotted by all major opposition party candidates, allowing Ershad a landslide victory amid reports of electoral irregularities.

In November 1986, Parliament passed the seventh constitutional amendment bill, protecting Ershad and his regime from prosecution for actions taken under the years of military rule. Martial law was subsequently lifted on 11 November.

In July 1987 the opposition parties united in opposition to government policies. Ershad declared a state of emergency in November, dissolved Parliament in December, and held parliamentary elections in March 1988. All major political parties refused to participate resulting in a victory for the Jatiya Party of Ershad.

In 1988 Parliament passed the controversial eighth amendment to the Constitution, which made Islam the state religion, in contravention of the original secular nature of the Constitution.

In 1990 a popular mass uprising led by future Prime Ministers Khaleda Zia and Sheikh Hasina led to Ershad resigning from the Presidency, and the country returning to parliamentary democracy, with the Office of the President becoming a largely ceremonial one.
