= Tajul Islam (worker) =

Bangladeshi worker killed by Pro-Ershad Cadres

Tazul Islam
- তাজুল ইসলাম
- Born: 1950; Chandpur District, East Bengal
- Died: 29 February 1984 (aged 34); Adamjee Jute Mills, Narayanganj, Bangladesh
- Cause of death: Killed
- Monuments: A sculpture in front of the CPB office.
- Education: M.A (Economics) & B.A. (Honours) in Economics, admitted in 1968.
- Alma mater: Dhaka University
- Years active: 1965 - 1984
- Known for: Trade Union, Democratic movement in Bangladesh
- Political party: Communist Party of Bangladesh

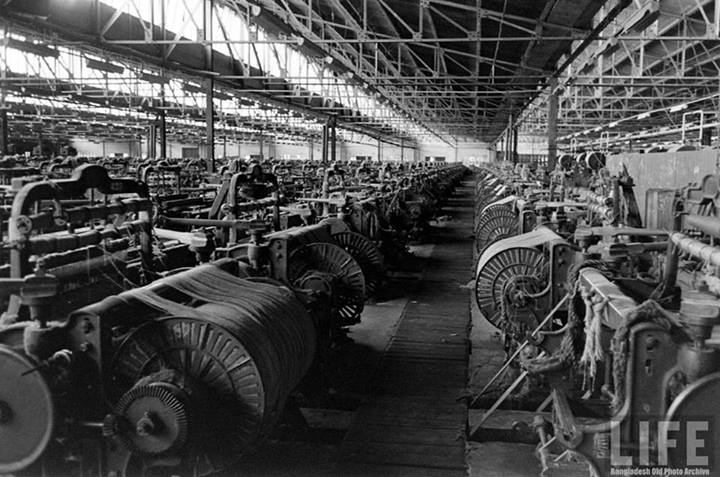
Adamjee Jute Mill machinery.

Tajul Islam (Bengali: শহীদ তাজুল ইসলাম) was a shifting worker at the Adamjee Jute Mills in Bangladesh. He was killed on 29 February 1984, at the mills by the armed cadres loyal to the autocratic regime of Hussain Muhammad Ershad and died receiving treatment on March 1. After completing higher education in economics at Dhaka University, he became involved in trade unionism in 1974 and went on to become the leader of the Adamjee Majdur (Worker) Trade Union.

In 1984, eleven workers’ federations called a strike at all mills and factories on March 1, the same day, he was killed to press their five demands that included trade union rights and a minimum wage scale of Tk 650. The then 15-party and 7-party alliances expressed solidarity with the programme that also demanded withdrawal of martial law.
