= Communist Party of Bangladesh =

Political party of Bangladesh

Communist Party of Bangladesh বাংলাদেশের কমিউনিস্ট পার্টি
- Abbreviation: CPB
- President: Kazi Sajjad Zahir Chandan
- General Secretary: Abdullah Kafee Ratan
- Founded: 1968; 58 years ago (as Communist Party of East Pakistan); 1971 (current form)
- Split from: Communist Party of Pakistan
- Merged into: Bangladesh Krishak Sramik Awami League (1975)
- Headquarters: Mukti Bhaban, 2 Comrade Moni Singh Street, Purana Paltan, Dhaka
- Newspaper: Muktijoddha (1971); Weekly Ekota (1972–present)
- Student wing: Bangladesh Students' Union (nominal)
- Youth wing: Bangladesh Youth Union
- Trade union wing: Bangladesh Trade Union Centre
- Ideology: Communism; Marxism–Leninism; Anti-fascism; Anti-imperialism; Secularism (Bangladeshi)
- Political position: Far-left
- National affiliation: Democratic United Front; LDA
- International affiliation: IMCWP
- Colours: Red
- Slogan: দুনিয়ার মজদুর, এক হও! ("Workers of the world, unite!")
- Anthem: "The Internationale"
- Bangladesh Parliament: 0 / 300

Election symbol
- Sickle

Party flag

Website
- cpbbd.org

The Communist Party of Bangladesh (Bengali: বাংলাদেশের কমিউনিস্ট পার্টি, abbreviated: CPB) is the dominant Marxist–Leninist political party in Bangladesh. It emerged from the East Pakistani wing of the Communist Party of Pakistan in 1968.

Following the Partition of India, the Communist Party of Pakistan (CPP) split from the Communist Party of India (CPI), and its East Pakistani wing was formed. After participating in the Bengali Language Movement and operating underground under state bans, the geopolitical separation and socio-economic differences between East and West Pakistan led the East Pakistani wing of the CPP to form a separate Communist Party of East Pakistan (CPEP) in 1968. The party actively participated in the 1969 mass uprising and the 1971 non-cooperation movement and organised a guerrilla force with the Bangladesh Students' Union and the National Awami Party (Muzaffar) during the Liberation War of Bangladesh. Following independence, it adopted its current name, joined the Bangladesh Krishak Sramik Awami League (BaKSAL) and was temporarily dissolved in 1975, and was later banned under military dictatorships from 1977 to 1978. It played an active role in the 1990 mass uprising, the 2013 Shahbag protests and the 2024 July mass uprising.

As a Marxist–Leninist organisation, the party is structured according to the principle of democratic centralism and has declared its objective as the "revolutionary democratic transformation of society and state". Kazi Sajjad Zahir Chandan has served as the party's president, and Abdullah Kafee Ratan has served as general secretary since 2025. The party is a leading member of the Democratic United Front and the Left Democratic Alliance.

== History ==
=== Background and formation ===
The Communist Party of Bangladesh traces its origins to the undivided Communist Party of India, which was first formed in Tashkent, Turkestan Autonomous Soviet Socialist Republic, in 1920 and established contact with revolutionary groups in Bengal such as the Anushilan Samiti and Jugantar. Following the emergence of regional communist circles across undivided India, including a group in Bengal led by Muzaffar Ahmad, the party was formally founded on 26 December 1925 at its first conference in Kanpur (then Cawnpore) with S. V. Ghate as its first General Secretary. During the final years of British rule (1943–1946), communists in Bengal organised major peasant uprisings, including the Tebhaga, Nankar, and Tanka movements.

After the Partition of India in 1947, delegates from Pakistan, including present‑day Bangladesh, attended the 2nd Congress of the Communist Party of India in Calcutta. On 6 March 1948, they held a separate session and established the Communist Party of Pakistan, with Sajjad Zaheer as central general secretary and Khoka Roy (later succeeded by Nepal Nag) heading the East Bengal provincial committee.

The party faced immediate repression from the Muslim League government. Notable examples include the 24 April 1950 Khapra Ward Massacre inside Rajshahi Central Jail that martyred seven communist prisoners and injured 31 others, alongside party-led peasant revolts such as the Nachole Uprising under Ila Mitra.

Despite heavy crackdowns by the government of Pakistan, East Bengali communists played an important role in organising the 1952 Bengali Language Movement and won four seats in the 1954 East Bengal Legislative Assembly election as part of the United Front.

Following the imposition of Governor's rule under Section 92-A in 1954 and throughout Ayub Khan's martial law regime (1958–1969), the party was banned and continued its activities underground or through allied parties such as the All-Pakistan Awami League and the National Awami Party (NAP).

The main base of the party remained in East Pakistan (now Bangladesh), separated from the western unit by nearly 2,000 km of Indian territory. The geographical divide, combined with government repression and uneven development of democratic movements, and the 1966 Sino-Soviet ideological split (which divided the party into a Moscow-aligned faction led by Moni Singh and a China-aligned camp under Mohammad Toaha) led communists in East Pakistan to seek an independent centre for their activities. At its 4th Conference in 1968, held clandestinely in Dhaka, the East Pakistan Provincial Committee declared the meeting to be the 1st Congress of the Communist Party of East Pakistan (CPEP) and elected a Central Committee with Barin Datta (Abdus Salam) as secretary.

The party played a vital role in the 1969 mass uprising against the military regime of Ayub Khan, which temporarily forced the government to release imprisoned communist leaders, and remained active during the nationwide non-cooperation movement of March 1971. Following the declaration of Operation Searchlight by the government of West Pakistan on 26 March 1971 and the start of the Bangladesh genocide, party president Moni Singh escaped from Rajshahi Central Jail on 7 April with the assistance of fellow prisoners and joined the independence struggle. He was subsequently appointed to the multi-party advisory council of the Provisional Government of Bangladesh, where he worked to secure political and diplomatic support from the Soviet Union and other socialist bloc countries.

During the Bangladesh Liberation War, the CPB actively organised armed resistance against the genocidal Pakistan Army. With the approval of the first Prime Minister of Bangladesh, Tajuddin Ahmad, and logistical support from the Communist Party of India, the CPB jointly established secret youth training camps in India, most notably at Tezpur in Assam and Panighatta in Siliguri, alongside the National Awami Party (Muzaffar) and the Bangladesh Students' Union. These camps trained roughly 17,000 to 20,000 fighters, forming a 5,000-strong NAP–CPB–BSU Special Guerrilla Force led by Mohammad Farhad with Pankaj Bhattacharya as deputy commander and Shah Alam as commander. While the remaining trainees joined the main Mukti Bahini, the Special Guerrilla Force operated across occupied districts, including Dhaka, Comilla, Noakhali, Chattogram, and Rangpur.

Apart from the Special Guerrilla Force, communists also took part in the other segments of the armed resistance fighters, including the Mukti Bahini and the new Bangladesh Armed Forces. The party also published the wartime newspaper Muktijoddha to mobilize public support. Following the surrender of Pakistani forces in December 1971, the Special Guerrilla Force formally surrendered its arms to President Sheikh Mujibur Rahman in Dhaka on 30 January 1972.

=== Independent Bangladesh ===
Following the independence of Bangladesh in 1971, the party adopted the name Communist Party of Bangladesh. It subsequently formed the Bangladesh Trade Union Centre to mobilize labour organisations along revolutionary lines. On 14 October 1973, the Gana Oikya Jote (Bengali: গণ ঐক্য জোট, lit. 'People's Unity Alliance') was formed, comprising the Awami League, CPB and NAP (Muzaffar), with a view to prepare ground for establishing socialism in the country. At its 1973 congress in Dacca, the party adopted a new constitution and elected a 26‑member central committee, with Moni Singh as president and Mohammad Farhad as general secretary. The party merged into Bangladesh Krishak Sramik Awami League (BaKSAL) on 25 January 1975 under President Sheikh Mujibur Rahman's "Second Revolution" programme.

On 15 August 1975, a coup d'état and subsequent assassination of Sheikh Mujibur Rahman occurred, which ultimately brought the country under military rule. CPB leaders and workers were victims of serious repression under the military government led by Khondaker Mostaq Ahmad. The party leaders in trade unions and at district levels were arrested, warrants were issued against many, and in October 1977, following the failed Bangladesh Air Force mutiny during the presidency of Ziaur Rahman, the CPB was placed under a blanket ban alongside the Jatiya Samajtantrik Dal (JaSaD) and the Purbo Banglar Communist Party (PBCP). In 1978 the ban on the party was, however, withdrawn, and its leaders were released. The CPB participated in the 1979 general election. As a member of the Ganatantrik Oikya Front, the CPB endorsed General M. A. G. Osmany in the 1978 presidential election. The CPB joined the 15-party alliance in 1983 against the military rule of Hussain Muhammad Ershad and participated in the 1986 general election, where it secured five seats. The CPB played a vital role in the 1990 mass uprising against Ershad.

In 1991, following the collapse of Soviet‑style socialism in Eastern Europe and the Soviet Union, the CPB entered a period of internal discussion regarding its future direction. Party leaders were divided between those who favoured dissolving the CPB in favour of a new democratic platform and those who supported maintaining the party in its original form. This debate grew in 1993 when the two opposing groups arranged separate conventions in Dhaka. The Marxist–Leninist group, in their convention held on 15 June 1993, resolved in favour of the independent existence of the CPB and had their new central executive committee formed with Shahidulla Chowdhury as president and Mujahidul Islam Selim as general secretary. At its 6th Congress in April 1995, the party declared a 17-point programme for a national democratic revolution. A Workers Party of Bangladesh faction merged with CPB in February 2010.

In February 2013, the CPB and its student wing, the Bangladesh Students' Union, played a leading role in the 2013 Shahbag protests to demand capital punishment for 1971 war criminals and a ban on Bangladesh Jamaat-e-Islami. Prominent CPB figures at the demonstrations included party president Mujahidul Islam Selim and student leader Lucky Akter, who later joined the CPB Central Committee. Due to the party's participation, its central office in Dhaka was attacked and vandalised during the 5 May 2013 protests by the far-right pressure group Hefazat-e-Islam, and was subsequently targeted in a bomb attack on May 11 by Jamaat-e-Islami and Shibir armed militants.

In November 2021, a seven-member central leadership faction of the Workers Party of Bangladesh (Marxist), led by its president Nurul Hasan, formally merged into the CPB. During the premiership of Sheikh Hasina, the CPB consistently spoke out against the Awami League’s repression and anti-people activities and organised anti-government protests and boycotted the 2014 and 2024 general elections.

Operating independently of both the then-ruling Awami League-led Grand Alliance and the main opposition Bangladesh Nationalist Party-led 20 Party Alliance, the party co-founded the Left Democratic Alliance in July 2018 to build a left-wing political alternative. The party actively participated in the 2024 Bangladesh quota reform movement and subsequent July Mass Uprising, breaking curfews to march in Dhaka on 26 July, and joining the Droho Jatra (March of Defiance) on 2 August ahead of Hasina's resignation on 5 August 2024.

== Organisation ==
Revolutionary internationalism is a cardinal aspect of the party's policy principles. Democratic centralism is the guiding organisational principle of the CPB. The party congress, which is convened every 4 years, is the supreme body of the party which elects a central committee accountable to it. The central committee is the highest organ of the party during the interval between the two congresses.

The CPB has organisations in 62 out of the 64 districts and 275 out of 520 upazilas in Bangladesh. The district and upazila committees coordinate and guide the activities of the zonal committees and the primary branches of the party. The party members are organised in these primary branches, The branches on their part organise "activist groups" which serve to prepare cadres for party membership. Besides party membership, the party also provides opportunity to include "associate members" from among supporters of the party.

The party members and activists are working in trade unions and mass organisations of agricultural workers, peasants, women, students, youth, children, teachers, doctors, lawyers, professionals, indigenous national minorities and aboriginal, cultural organszations etc. In spite of relatively small number of party members and associate members, the party is capable of mobilising several hundreds of thousands of people through its influence in these mass organisations.

The main organ of the party is Weekly Ekota (Translation: 'Unity'; Bengali: 'একতা')

== Ideology and policies ==
=== Ideology ===
As a communist party, the CPB is committed to communism. The party identifies with Marxism–Leninism and maintains a class‑based analysis of society. It is organised as a vanguard party and pursues a united front strategy. It works with a strategy of bringing about a "revolutionary democratic transformation of society and state." The party has put forward a 17‑point programme in consonance with this strategic goal of "revolutionary democratic transformation".

After the fall of socialism in Eastern Europe and the dissolution of the Soviet Union, the party has continued to advocate for the advancement of the rights of the working class, women, and ethnic and religious minorities.

=== Foreign Policy ===
The party is known for regularly voicing anti‑imperialist views, especially in its criticism of the foreign policies of the United States, India, and Pakistan. It firmly supports Palestinian independence and a one‑state solution and has voiced its opposition to the Gaza genocide by Israel.

The CPB expressed solidarity with the Palestinian people and condemned Israeli military actions in the occupied Palestinian territories. These statements called for an immediate end to violence against civilians and urged the international community to uphold international law and protect Palestinian national rights. At a CPB rally in Dhaka held in response to the assault on Gaza, the party described the attacks as a violation of the ceasefire, attributed responsibility to broader imperialist forces, and accused the United States and its regional allies of supporting the offensive.

The CPB also issued a message of solidarity with the Cuban people and government, condemning the United States' economic, commercial, and financial blockade on Cuba and calling for its lifting. The party criticised the impact of the blockade over more than six decades, including its intensification during the COVID‑19 pandemic and Cuba's designation as a state sponsor of terrorism.

==== International Engagement ====
The CPB maintains contacts with foreign envoys and political parties. As part of these activities, the party has hosted meetings and participated in events involving representatives of several countries.

In November 2024, Palestinian Ambassador Yousef S.Y. Ramadan attended a CPB‑organised discussion at the National Press Club in Dhaka marking the International Day of Solidarity with the Palestinian People. The event was presided over by CPB President Shah Alam and featured contributions from party leaders, civil society figures, and cultural organisations.

The party met with the Chinese ambassador to discuss party‑to‑party relations and political cooperation. It also held a meeting with Vietnamese National Assembly Chairman Vương Đình Huệ during his official visit to Bangladesh, where the two sides discussed party‑to‑party relations, bilateral cooperation, and prospects for future economic and political engagement.

In May 2026, the CPB attended the 3rd International Anti-Fascist Forum along with delegations from over 100 countries in Moscow, Russia. CPB President Kazi Sajjad Zahir Chandan spoke at the forum and called for global unity against American imperialism, capitalism, fascism, and neo-colonialism.

=== Political Positions ===
The party favours maintaining the current Constitution of Bangladesh and strongly supports the fundamental principles of nationalism, socialism, democracy, and secularism. It has repeatedly voiced opposition to any reversion of these principles. The CPB actively participated in the formulation of the July Charter following the July mass uprising but refused to sign it, alleging historical negationism related to the Liberation War.

The CPB has been working to bring together left‑wing forces to provide an alternative to the current political system. It has given special attention to strengthening the party and its mass organisations, increasing cohesion among communists, moving toward communist unity, and strengthening and expanding the Left Democratic Alliance.

The party has also criticised labour conditions in Bangladesh, especially workplace safety in hazardous industries. It has argued that repeated industrial accidents show failures in oversight and regulation, blaming both authorities and factory owners for not ensuring proper safety measures. It has called for stronger enforcement of labour laws, better safety standards, and greater accountability from employers.

The CPB and the LDA have opposed government plans to lease parts of Chittagong Port to foreign companies. They organised protests and symbolic blockades, arguing that foreign control of key terminals would undermine national interests and threaten workers' rights, and called for the withdrawal of the proposed lease agreements.

== Election results ==
=== Jatiya Sangsad elections ===
Election	Party leader	Votes	%	Seats	+/–	Position	Government
1973	Mohammad Farhad	47,211	0.25%	0 / 300	New	▲7th	Extra-parliamentary
1979	Mohammad Farhad	75,455	0.39%	0 / 300	0	▼10th	Extra-parliamentary
1986	Mohammad Farhad	259,728	0.91%	5 / 300	▲5	▲7th	Opposition
1988	Mohammad Farhad	Boycotted		0 / 300	▼5	—N/a	Extra-parliamentary
1991	Mujahidul Islam Selim	407,515	1.19%	5 / 300	▲5	7th	Opposition
Feb 1996	Mujahidul Islam Selim	Boycotted		0 / 300	▼5	—N/a	Extra-parliamentary
Jun 1996	Mujahidul Islam Selim	48,549	0.11%	0 / 300	0	▼11th	Extra-parliamentary
2001	Mujahidul Islam Selim	56,991	0.10%	0 / 300	0	▲10th	Extra-parliamentary
2008	Mujahidul Islam Selim	42,331	0.06%	0 / 300	0	▼17th	Extra-parliamentary
2014	Mujahidul Islam Selim	Boycotted		0 / 300	0	—N/a	Extra-parliamentary
2018	Mujahidul Islam Selim	55,421	0.07%	0 / 300	0	▲14th	Extra-parliamentary
2024	Shah Alam	Boycotted		0 / 300	0	—N/a	Extra-parliamentary
2026	Kazi Sajjad Zahir Chandan	61,000	0.08%	0 / 300	0	▼15th	Extra-parliamentary

== List of prominent members ==
- Anil Mukherjee (1912–1982) secretary of the Central Committee
- Badruddin Umar (1931–2025) Member of the CPB's central committee
- Barun Roy (1922–2009) Member of parliament
- Bishnu Chattopadhyay (1910–1971) Communist revolutionary killed by razakar forces during the liberation war
- Hena Das (1924–2009) Female communist freedom fighter and anti-colonial revolutionary
- Shaheed Tajul Islam (died 1 March 1984) — The leader of the Adamjee Majdur Trade Union who was killed in 1984. His death anniversary is observed by the CPB.
- Mohammad Farhad (1938–1987) — Former leader of the CPB and member of the Bangladesh Parliament.
- Nalini Das (1910–1982) Party organiser in Barisal
- Haider Akbar Khan Rono (1942–2024) secretary of the party's Dhaka city unit
- Moni Singh (1901–1990) Founding member
- Muzahidul Islam Selim
- Shah Alam

== See also ==
- Bangladesh Trade Union Centre
