= Muzaffar Ahmed (NAP politician) =

Bangladeshi politician and professor (1922–2019)

Professor Muzaffar Ahmed
- মোজাফফর আহমদ
- Born: 14 April 1922; Comilla District, Bengal Presidency, British India
- Died: 23 August 2019 (aged 97); Dhaka, Bangladesh
- Citizenship: British subject (Until 1947); Pakistan (Until 1971); Bangladesh
- Education: University of Dhaka
- Political party: National Awami Party (Muzaffar)
- Other political affiliations: National Awami Party
- Movement: Bangladesh Liberation War; Bengali language movement
- Spouse: Amina Ahmed

Muzaffar Ahmed (14 April 1922 – 23 August 2019) was a Bangladeshi politician and professor. He was an advisor of the Provisional Government of Bangladesh during the Bangladesh Liberation War in 1971. He was the president of the National Awami Party (Muzaffar).

== Early life ==
Ahmed was born at Elahabad village of Debidwar Upazila in Comilla District in 1922. He graduated from University of Dhaka. He taught at the same university and also participated in the Bengali language movement.

== Career ==
Ahmed started his political career in 1937 by joining the Student Federation, a leftist students' organisation. In 1954, he defeated Muslim League leader Mofiz Uddin in the East Bengal Legislative Election.

In 1957, Ahmed formed the National Awami Party (NAP) under the leadership of Abdul Hamid Khan Bhashani.

In 1967, Ahmed became the president of the-then East Pakistan NAP (Pro-Moscow), as the main NAP was divided on the question of following pro-Soviet and pro-Chinese lines.

In 1971, Ahmed served as an adviser of the Mujibnagar Government, the Bangladeshi government-in-exile, during the Bangladesh Liberation war. He spoke in favor of Bangladesh during the war at the United Nations General Assembly. Ahmed founded a special guerrilla force comprising the members of National Awami Party (NAP), Communist Party of Bangladesh, and Bangladesh Students Union in 1971. After the independence of Bangladesh, he was offered a ministry position but refused.

In 2015, Ahmed was nominated for the Independence Day Award, the highest civilian award in Bangladesh, in 2015. He refused the award on principle because he believed politics should be for the people not position or power.

== Personal life and death ==
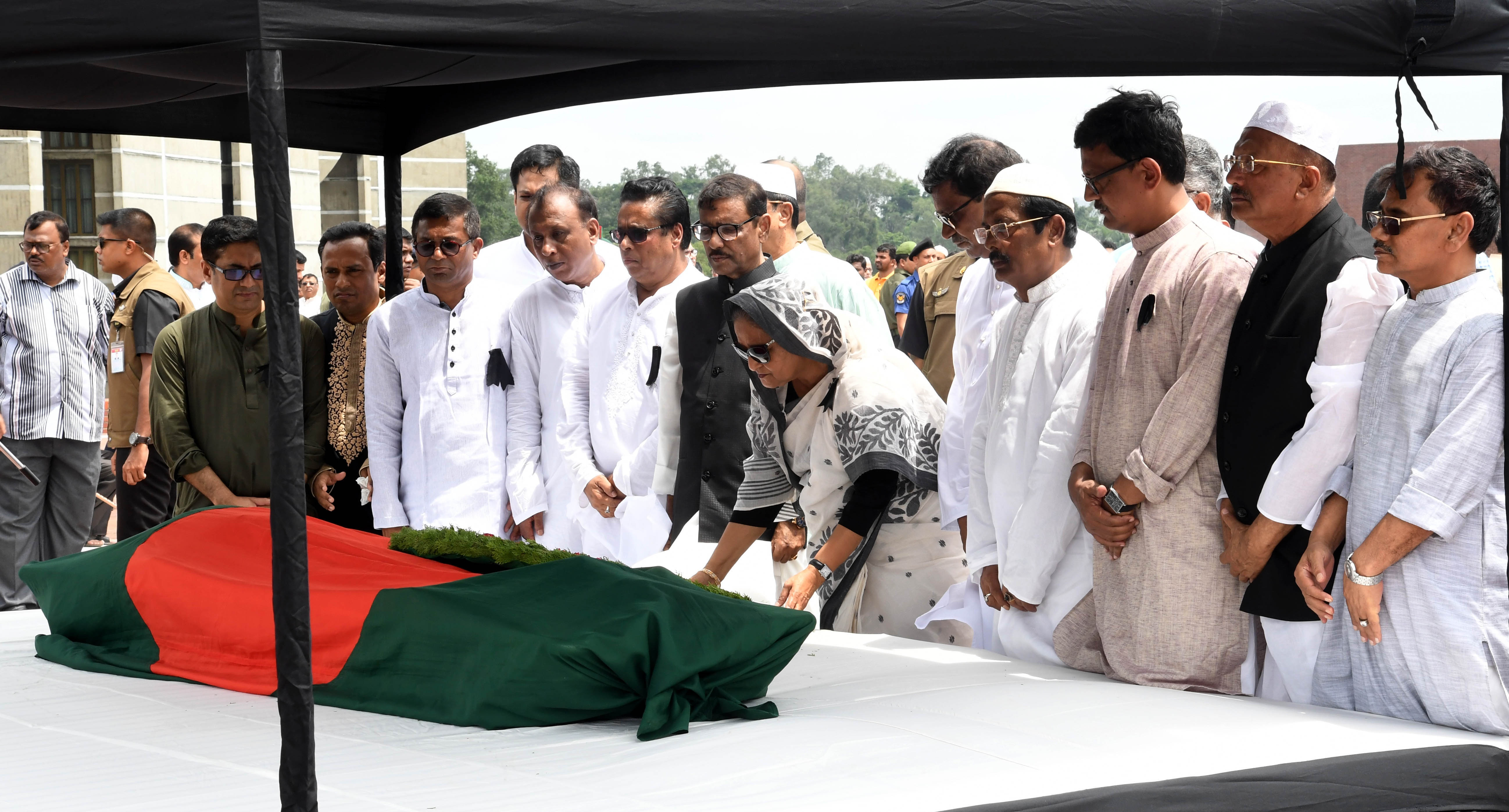
Prime Minister Sheikh Hasina pays homage to Muzaffar Ahmed, Dhaka, 2019

Ahmed's wife Amina Ahmed was elected to parliament in 2008 from a women's reserved seat as a Bangladesh Awami League candidate. Together they had a daughter, Ivy Ahmed.

Ahmed died on 23 August in 2019 in Dhaka. His funeral was attended by Prime Minister of Bangladesh Sheikh Hasina, and took place on the grounds of the parliament building. He was buried in Debidwar Upazila, Comilla District with full state honours.
