= Revolutionary Communist League of Bangladesh =

Marxist-Leninist political party in Bangladesh

Revolutionary Communist League of Bangladesh বাংলাদেশের বিপ্লবী কমিউনিস্ট লীগ
- Abbreviation: RCLB
- General Secretary: Iqbal Kabir Jahid
- Founded: April 2013
- Student wing: Revolutionary Student Unity
- Ideology: Communism; Marxism-Leninism; Anti-imperialism
- National affiliation: Democratic United Front; LDA

The Revolutionary Communist League of Bangladesh (Bengali: বাংলাদেশের বিপ্লবী কমিউনিস্ট লীগ; abbreviated RCLB), originally known as the United Communist League of Bangladesh (Bengali: বাংলাদেশের ইউনাইটেড কমিউনিস্ট লীগ; abbreviated UCLB), is a political party in Bangladesh, founded in April 2013 through the merger conference of the Communist League of Bangladesh and the Workers Party (Reconstituted) of Bangladesh held in Dhaka. Mosharraf Hossain Nannu is the general secretary of the party, Abdus Satter, Azizur Rahman, Ranjit Chattapadhya and Afsar Ali serve as secretariat members. The founding conference elected a 19-member central committee. The party is aligned with the Left Democratic Alliance. Its current name was adopted in 2022 following a merger with the Workers Party of Bangladesh (Marxist).
