= Oikya National Awami Party =

National Awami Party ন্যাশনাল আওয়ামী পার্টি
- Abbreviation: Oikya NAP
- Founded: 2010
- Merger of: NAP (Bhasani); NAP (Muzaffar); JEP
- Ideology: Socialism
- Political position: Left-wing
- National affiliation: Democratic United Front

The Oikya National Awami Party (alternatively the Oikya NAP or United National Awami Party) is a political party in Bangladesh. Pankaj Bhattacharya (d. 2023) was the president of the party.

As of 2019, Asadullah Tareque was the general secretary of the party. Presidium members of the party included S.M.A. Sobur, Aliza Hasan and Ranjit Kumar Saha. By November 2019 Harunar Rashid was the acting general secretary of the party.

The party sought recognition from the Bangladesh Election Commission in December 2017.
