= Socialist Party of Bangladesh (Marxist) =

Political party in Bangladesh

Socialist Party of Bangladesh বাংলাদেশের সমাজতান্ত্রিক দল (মার্কসবাদী)
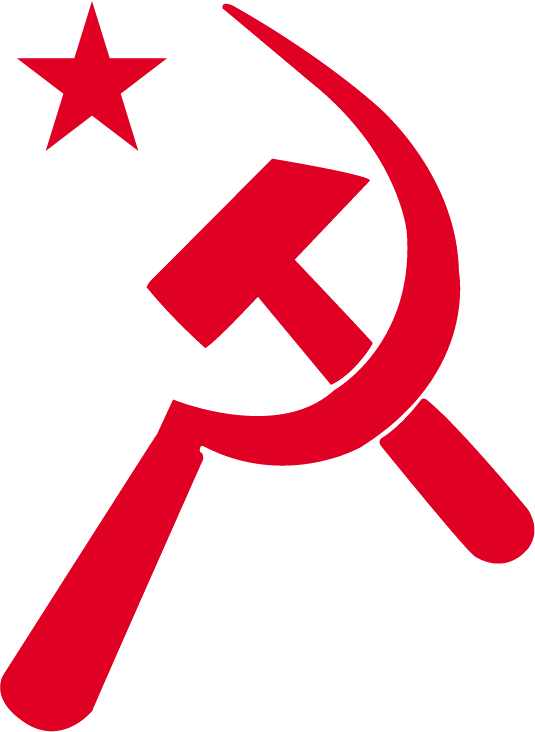
- General Secretary: Masud Rana
- Founder: Mubinul Haider Chowdhury
- Founded: 7 April 2013
- Preceded by: Socialist Party of Bangladesh
- Headquarters: 22/1 Topkhana Road, Dhaka, Bangladesh
- Newspaper: Sammobad
- Youth wing: Bangladesh Youth Front
- Ideology: Communism; Marxism–Leninism; Anti-imperialism; Anti-revisionism; Shibdas Ghosh Thought; Secularism (Bangladeshi)
- Political position: Far-left
- National affiliation: Democratic United Front; LDA
- Colors: Red
- Slogan: "Duniyar Mojdur, Ek Hou" (Bengali) "Workers of the world, unite"
- Bangladesh Parliament: 0 / 350

Election symbol
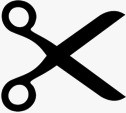
- Scissors

Party flag

Website
- spbm.org

The Socialist Party of Bangladesh (Marxist) (Bengali: বাংলাদেশের সমাজতান্ত্রিক দল (মার্কসবাদী), abbreviated as BSD (Marxist) or BaSaD (Marxist)) or SPBM is an anti-revisionist Marxist–Leninist party in Bangladesh. The party is affiliated with the Democratic United Front, a coalition of left‑wing, anti-imperialist parties in the country.

Due to the non-recognition of Shibdas Ghosh, the theorist of revolutionary politics in India, as an international authority of the communist movement, two central leaders left the Socialist Party of Bangladesh in 2013 and formed the new party. In February 2020, another split occurred following the expulsion of working committee member Subhangshu Chakrabarty and sixteen forum members. The split led to the formation of the Communist Movement of Bangladesh (CMB).

The party's monthly newspaper is called Sammobad (lit. 'Communism').

== History ==
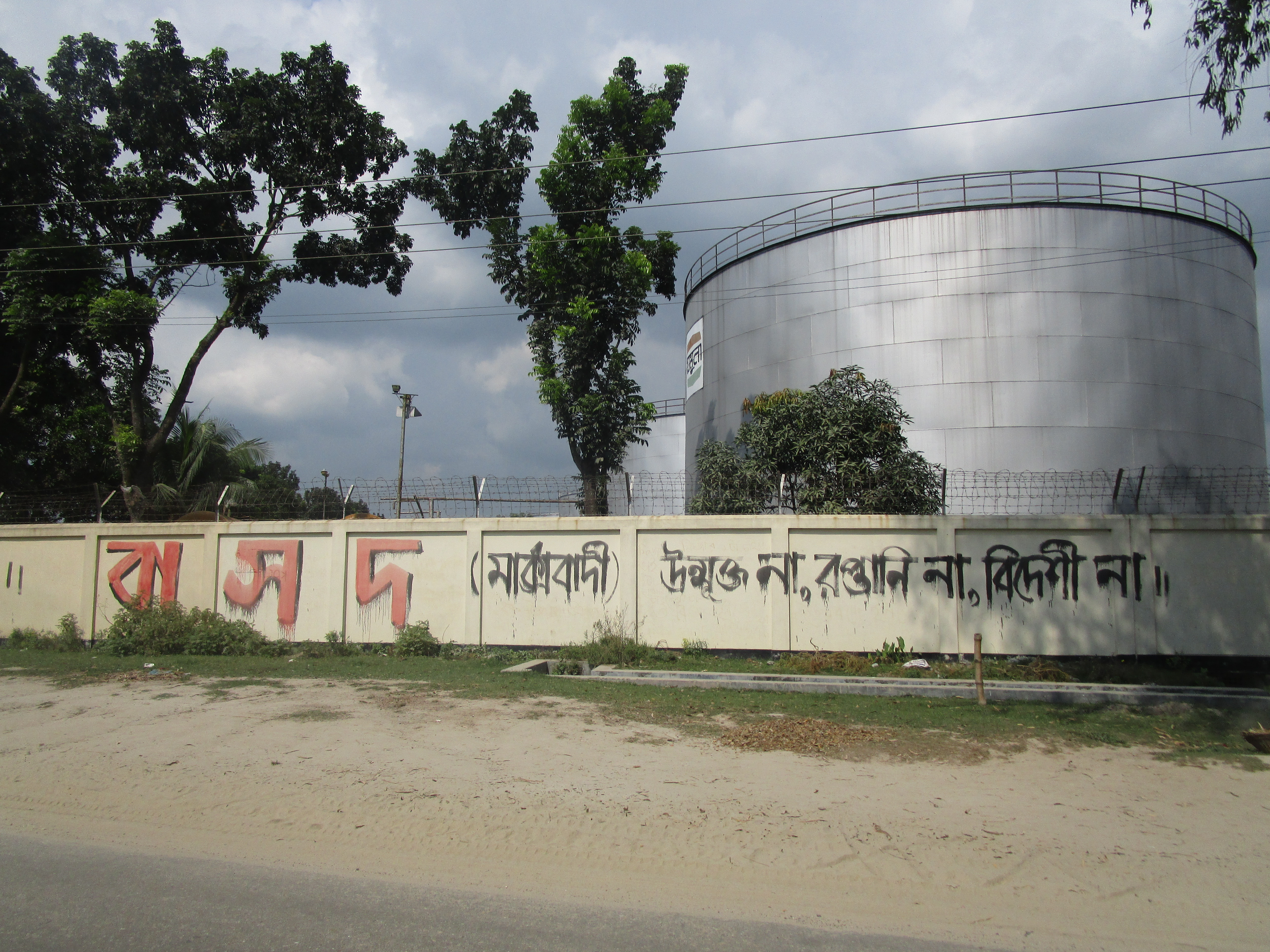
BSD-Marxist party's graffiti against open-coal mining, Parbatipur.

The party made its debut at a press conference on 7 April 2013. It was formed by members of BSD under the leadership of Mubinul Haider Chowdhury who did not agree with party's policy towards Ganajagaran Mancha and Shivdas Ghosh. This faction wanted Shivdas Ghosh to be declared the international authority of the communist movement. Mubinul Haider Chowdhury was elected General Secretary of the 9-member Central Working Committee at a Special Central Convention held on 20–23 November 2014.

Due to the lack of proper application of ideology in the organization, a breakdown took place in February 2020. The rift was accelerated by the expulsion of 18 leaders and activists, including Shuvrangshu Chakraborty. This rebel fraction tried to form a new party called the Socialist Party of Bangladesh (Marxist) - Central Pathchakra Forum. Later on 3 April 2021 this fraction under the leadership of Subhangshu Chakrabarty launched the Communist Movement of Bangladesh (CMB). In a press conference the rebel leader Subhangshu Chakrabarty claimed that CMB is the only party in Bangladesh with a true revolutionary Marxist idea.

On 15 November 2026, SPBM formed a 13-member central committee, with Masud Rana unanimously elected as its general secretary.

== See also ==
- Shibdas Ghosh
- Socialist Unity Centre of India (Communist)
- List of political parties in Bangladesh
- List of anti-revisionist groups
