= Trade unions in Bangladesh =

Global Rights Index
- 5 No guarantee of rights

International Labour Organization
- Bangladesh is a member of the ILO

Trade unions in Bangladesh work to improve working conditions in Bangladesh, particularly after the Rana Plaza collapse of 2013.
