= Left Democratic Alliance (Bangladesh) =

Left-wing political alliance in Bangladesh

Left Democratic Alliance বাম গণতান্ত্রিক জোট
- Abbreviation: LDA
- Coordinator: Ruhin Hossain Prince
- Founded: 18 July 2018
- Ideology: Communism; Marxism–Leninism; Anti-imperialism; Factions: Stalinism; Maoism; Anti-revisionism; Shibdas Ghosh Thought
- Political position: Far-left
- National affiliation: Democratic United Front

Left Democratic Alliance (Bengali: বাম গণতান্ত্রিক জোট) is a alliance of six far-left political parties in Bangladesh. Out of these six parties, three parties - CPB, SPB (Basad), and SPBM are registered by Bangladesh Election Commission. The remaining three parties are not registered. The alliance participated in the July Uprising, which successfully deposed Sheikh Hasina from power.

== Formation ==
The alliance was formally announced on 18 July 2018 at a press conference held at its temporary office in Paltan. At the time of its formation, the coalition consisted of eight political parties. On 24 May 2022, the membership of Ganosamhati Andolan and the Revolutionary Workers Party, citing their lack of participation in alliance activities and failure to follow collective decisions.

== Members ==
The alliance was formed by eight left-wing parties and currently consists of six.

Party	Ideology	Symbol
Communist Party of Bangladesh বাংলাদেশের কমিউনিস্ট পার্টি	Marxism–Leninism	
Socialist Party of Bangladesh বাংলাদেশের সমাজতান্ত্রিক দল	Marxism–Leninism–Maoism; Anti-revisionism	
Socialist Party of Bangladesh (Marxist) বাংলাদেশের সমাজতান্ত্রিক দল (মার্কসবাদী)	Shibdas Ghosh thought Anti-revisionism	
Democratic Revolutionary Party গণতান্ত্রিক বিপ্লবী দল	Marxism–Leninism	
Revolutionary Communist League of Bangladesh বাংলাদেশের বিপ্লবী কমিউনিস্ট লীগ	Marxism–Leninism	
Bangladesh Samajtantrik Party বাংলাদেশ সমাজতান্ত্রিক পার্টি	Marxism–Leninism	

=== Former members ===
Party	Ideology
Mass Solidarity Movement গণসংহতি আন্দোলন	Progressivism
Revolutionary Workers Party of Bangladesh বাংলাদেশের বিপ্লবী ওয়ার্কার্স পার্টি	Marxism–Leninism

== See also ==
- Democratic United Front
- Ganatantra Manch
- Left Democratic Front (Pakistan)
