= Mujahidul Islam Selim =

Bangladeshi politician (born 1948)

Mujahidul Islam Khan Selim
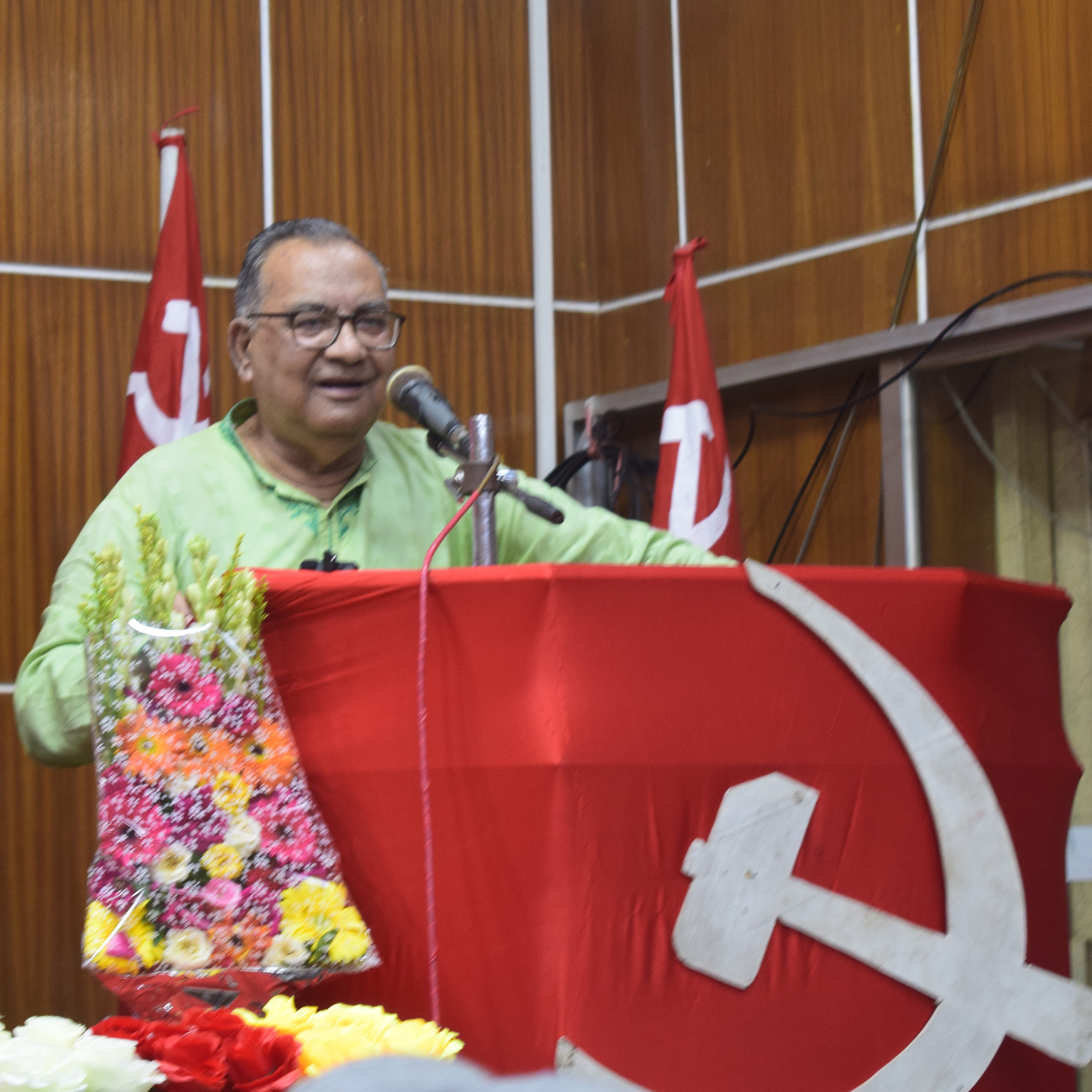

President of the Communist Party of Bangladesh
- In office 1990–2022
- Preceded by: Moni Singh
- Succeeded by: Shah Alam

Vice-President of Dhaka University Central Students' Union
- In office 1972–1973

Personal details
- Born: 16 April 1948 (age 78) Dhaka, Bangladesh
- Party: Communist Party of Bangladesh
- Profession: Politician

Mujahidul Islam Khan Selim (Bengali: মুজাহিদুল ইসলাম খান সেলিম; born 16 April 1948) is a Bangladeshi politician. Khan Selim served as the president of Communist Party of Bangladesh.

== Career ==
Selim is also a Muktijoddha and is the leader of 1969 armed uprising of students on Chittagong, He was elected as vice president of the Dhaka University Central students union (DUCSU) in post-independence Bangladesh.

In 1993, Selim was elected general secretary of the Communist Party of Bangladesh at a time when most leaders had left the party following the collapse of the Soviet Union.

In 2012, Selim was elected president of the Communist Party of Bangladesh.

Selim received death threats on 5 December 2015 from Mission Jihadists.
