= Bangladesh Youth Union =

Youth organization in Bangladesh

Bangladesh Youth Union বাংলাদেশ যুব ইউনিয়ন
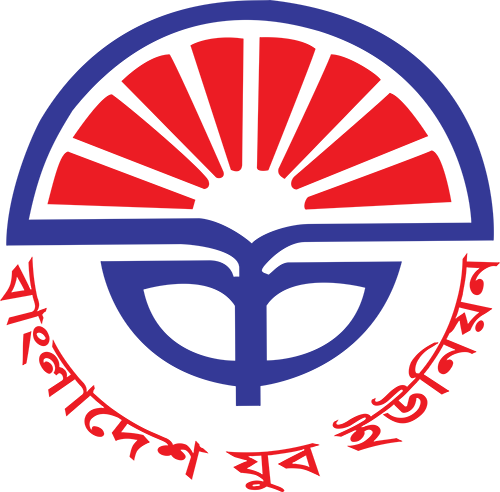
- President: Khan Asaduzzaman Masum
- Secretary General: Jahangir Alam Nannu
- Founded: August 28, 1976; 50 years ago
- Ideology: Communism; Marxism–Leninism; Anti-imperialism
- Mother party: Communist Party of Bangladesh
- International affiliation: WFDY
- Website: byubd.org

Bangladesh Youth Union (Bengali: বাংলাদেশ যুব ইউনিয়ন, lit. 'Bangladesh Youth Union') is the youth wing of the Communist Party of Bangladesh (CPB).

== History ==
On 28 August 1976, the Bangladesh Youth Union was established.

In November 1976, the first meeting was held at Nababpur Mahbub Ali Institute and Youth Union's first convening committee was declared, Abul Kashem was elected and appointed as convener.

The first national conference was held at Engineers Institution Auditorium in January 1977. At that conference, the organization's name was renamed to 'Bangladesh Youth Union'. At that conference, Nurul Islam Nahid was elected as the president and Abul Kashem was elected as the general secretary.

At the second conference of Youth Union in 1981, Abul Kashem was elected and appointed as president and Mahbub Zaman was elected as general secretary of Youth Union.

Youth Union was involved in 1990 Bangladesh mass uprising and other similar movements.

In June 2021, the central office of Youth Union was vandalized.
