= Moni Singh =

Bangladeshi communist leader and freedom fighter (1900–1990)

- মনি সিং

General Secretary of Communist Party of Bangladesh
- In office 1965–1971

Member of Advisory Council, Provisional Government of Bangladesh
- In office 1971–1971

General Secretary of Communist Party of Bangladesh
- In office 1980–1990
- President: Mohammad Farhad

Personal details
- Born: 28 June 1901 Susang-Durgapur, Mymensingh district, Bengal Presidency, British India (now Durgapur Upazila, Netrokona, Bangladesh)
- Died: 31 December 1990 (aged 89)
- Party: Communist Party of Bangladesh
- Other political affiliations: Bangladesh Krishak Sramik Awami League
- Parent: Kali Kumar Singh (father)
- Occupation: Politician
- Awards: Independence Day Award (2004)

Moni Singh (Bengali: মনি সিং; 28 June 1901 – 31 December 1990), also known by the pseudonym Comrade Moni Singh, was a Bangladeshi politician and the founder of the Communist Party of East Pakistan.

Singh operated a guerrilla wing of the Mukti Bahini during the Bangladesh Liberation War in 1971 and was an adviser to the Provisional Government of Bangladesh.

== Early life ==
Singh was born on 28 June 1901 in Susang-Durgapur, Mymensingh district, Bengal Presidency, British India (now Durgapur Upazila, Netrokona, Bangladesh). He completed his secondary schooling in Kolkata. He joined Anushilan Samiti in 1914. He left the Samiti and joined the Communist Party of India in 1925. His father was Kali Kumar Singh and grandfather was a zamindar. His mother was a member of the royal family of Susang Durgapur.

== Career ==
Singh led of strike of workers of Kesharam Cotton Mills in Kolkata in 1928. He was imprisoned from 1930 to November 1937. After being released he moved back to Susang-Durgapur where he led peasants in protests against Tanka, a sharecropping in which the majority of the produced goods went to the landowner. In 1945, he worked as an organizer of All India Kisan Sabha in Netrokona District. He led a protests of Hajong tribesmen against the Tanka system which became violent. An arrest warrant was issued against him and his properties were confiscated.

Prior to the partition of India in August 1947, Singh was a successful workers' leader who led movements to abolish exploitative labour practices. He was imprisoned for long stretches on three occasions: 1930–37, 1967–69, and 1969–71. He was first elected Communist Party of East Pakistan head in 1951, when Bangladesh was part of Pakistan, and led it with one short interruption until his death. After the Sino-Soviet split, Singh took the side of the Soviets. Because of this, the party split in 1966. He was released after the 1969 Mass uprising.

Singh fought in the Bangladesh Liberation war and was a member of the advisory council of the Mujibnagar government. He was elected President of the Communist Party of Bangladesh in 1973. In 1975, he joined the Bangladesh Krishak Sramik Awami League government. After the assassination of Sheikh Mujibur Rahman and the dissolution of Bangladesh Krishak Sramik Awami League government, he revived the Communist Party of Bangladesh in 1976. He participated in the 2nd general election of Bangladesh in 1978 as part of the Democratic Alliance. He was elected President of the Communist Party of Bangladesh in 1980 and retained that post till his death. His autobiography, Jiban Sangram (1983), was first published in Bengali before it was translated into English with the title Life is a Struggle (1988).

== Death and legacy ==
Singh died 31 December 1990. He was awarded the Independence Day Award in 2004.
