= Socialist Party of Bangladesh =

Socialist Party of Bangladesh বাংলাদেশের সমাজতান্ত্রিক দল
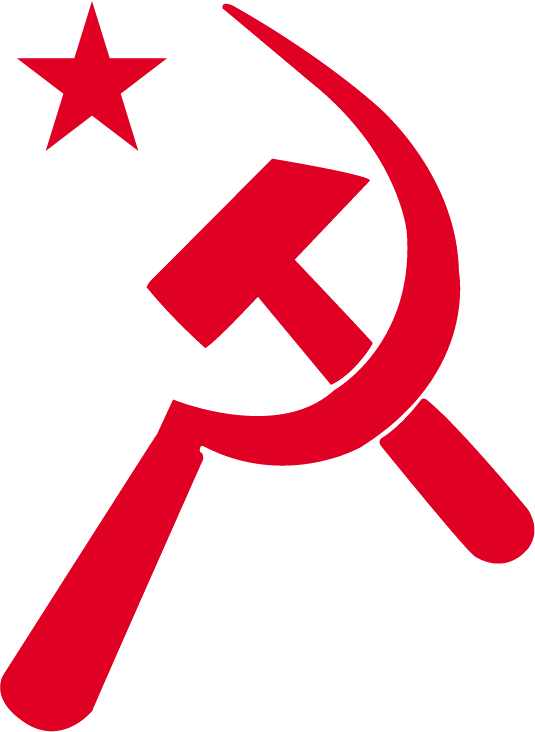
- Abbreviation: BSD; BaSaD; BASOD; SPB
- General Secretary: Bazlur Rashid Firoz
- Founder: Khalequzzaman Bhuiyan
- Founded: 7 November 1980
- Split from: Jatiya Samajtantrik Dal
- Headquarters: 23/2 Topkhana Road, Dhaka, Bangladesh
- Newspaper: Vanguard
- Student wing: Socialist Students' Front
- Trade union: Socialist Workers' Front
- Ideology: Communism; Marxism–Leninism; Anti-imperialism; Anti-revisionism; Secularism (Bangladeshi)
- Political position: Far-left
- National affiliation: Democratic United Front; LDA
- International affiliation: ICOR
- Colours: Red
- Slogan: দুনিয়ার মজদুর, এক হও! ("Workers of the world, unite!")
- Bangladesh Parliament: 0 / 350

Election symbol
- Ladder

Party flag

Website
- spb.org.bd

The Socialist Party of Bangladesh (Bengali: বাংলাদেশের সমাজতান্ত্রিক দল) is an anti-revisionist Marxist–Leninist party in Bangladesh. The party was founded by Comrade Khalequzzaman on 7 November 1980.

== Ideology ==
SPB is an anti-revisionist Marxist–Leninist communist party. The party supports the ideologies of Karl Marx, Friedrich Engels, Vladimir Lenin, Joseph Stalin, and Mao Zedong. The SPB party holds that Bangladesh is a "capitalist semi-fascist" country. Following its analysis, the party seeks to establish a socialist state through revolution throughout Bangladesh.

In 2013, a group of members under the leadership of Mubinul Haider Chowdhury broke away from the party and formed the Socialist Party of Bangladesh (Marxist) over disagreement on recognition of the thought of Shibdas Ghosh and Ganajagaran Mancha.

== Organization ==
=== Central committee ===
There are 14 members in the central committee of the party. Comrade Bazlur Rashid Firoz is the General Secretary of Central Committee of SPB.

- General Secretary: Bazlur Rashid Firoz
- Joint General Secretary: Razequzzaman Ratan
- Members:
  - Abdul Kuddus
  - Nikhil Das
  - Janardon Datta Nantu
  - Abdur Razzaq
  - Wazed Parvez
  - Rowshan Ara Rusho
  - Saiful Islam Poltu
  - Julfikar Ali
  - Nabo Kumar Karmakar
  - Sofiur Rahanan Sofi
  - Shampa Basu
  - Manisha Chakraborty

=== Mass organizations ===
SPB has many political wings, some of them are:

- Socialist Students' Front (SSF)
- Socialist Labour Front (SLF)
- Socialist Peasants' Front (SPF)
- Socialist Women's Forum (SWF)
- Progressive Teachers' forum (PTF)
- Progressive Engineers' and Architects' Forum (PEAF)
- Progressive Lawyers' Front (PLF)
- Progressive Agriculturist Centre (PAC)
- Progressive Doctors Forum (PDF)
- Progressive Art and Mass Media Workers Forum (PAMMWF)
- Bangladesh Shipping Workers Federation (BSWF)
- Re-rolling Steel Mills Labour Front (RSMLF)
- Charan Sangskritik Kendro
- Shishu Kishor Mela (SKM)
- Platform of Science Movement (PSM)

==== Socialist Students' Front ====
The Socialist Students' Front (SSF) (Bengali: সমাজতান্ত্রিক ছাত্রফ্রন্ট) is the student's wing of SPB. This organization is one of the largest leftist students' organization in the country. The slogans of the SSF are: "Socialist Students' Front, commitments to the revolution!" and "Socialist Students' Front, commitments to save the rights of education!"

The SSF was established on 21 January 1984. The main objective of the SSF is to build a students’ movement throughout the country to bring about educational reforms to make education cheap, universal, scientific, truly secular, equal, and democratic, and to create an education system that is a revolutionary movement for the overthrow of capitalism and establishment of socialist state. SSF is a member of several international students' organizations including World Federation of Democratic Youth.

=== Mouthpiece ===
The official party newspaper, Vanguard (Bengali: ভ্যানগার্ড), is published monthly in Bengali. SPB central committee member Razequzzaman Ratan is the current chief editor.

== Election results ==
=== Jatiya Sangsad elections ===
Election	Party leader	Votes	%	Seats	+/–	Position	Government
1991	Khalequzzaman Bhuiyan	34,868	0.10%	0 / 300	New	▲21st	Extra-parliamentary
Feb 1996	Khalequzzaman Bhuiyan	Boycotted		0 / 300	0	—N/a	Extra-parliamentary
Jun 1996	Khalequzzaman Bhuiyan	10,234	0.02%	0 / 300	0	▲20th	Extra-parliamentary
2001	Khalequzzaman Bhuiyan	21,164	0.04%	0 / 300	0	▲13th	Extra-parliamentary
2008	Khalequzzaman Bhuiyan	38,643	0.06%	0 / 300	0	▼18th	Extra-parliamentary
2014	Khalequzzaman Bhuiyan	Boycotted		0 / 300	0	—N/a	Extra-parliamentary
2018	Khalequzzaman Bhuiyan	17,591	0.02%	0 / 300	0	▼19th	Extra-parliamentary
2024	Bazlur Rashid Firoz	Boycotted		0 / 300	0	—N/a	Extra-parliamentary
2026	Bazlur Rashid Firoz	40,000	0.05%	0 / 300	0	▲13th	Extra-parliamentary

== See also ==
- List of anti-revisionist groups
