= Bangladesh Students' Union =

Student organization in Bangladesh

Bangladesh Students' Union বাংলাদেশ ছাত্র ইউনিয়ন
- BSU Emblem
- President: Mahir Shahriar Reza
- General Secretary: Bahauddin Shuvo
- Founded: 26 April 1952; 74 years ago
- Headquarters: 2 Comrade Moni Singh Road, Purana Paltan, Dhaka
- Ideology: Socialism (Bangladeshi); Communism
- Position: Left-wing
- Colours: Blue
- International affiliation: World Federation of Democratic Youth; International Union of Students
- Wings in affiliation: Pritilata Brigade; Cultural Union; Jono Biggan Andolon; Ishkol
- Newspaper: Joyodhwoni
- Website: bsu1952.org.bd

Flag

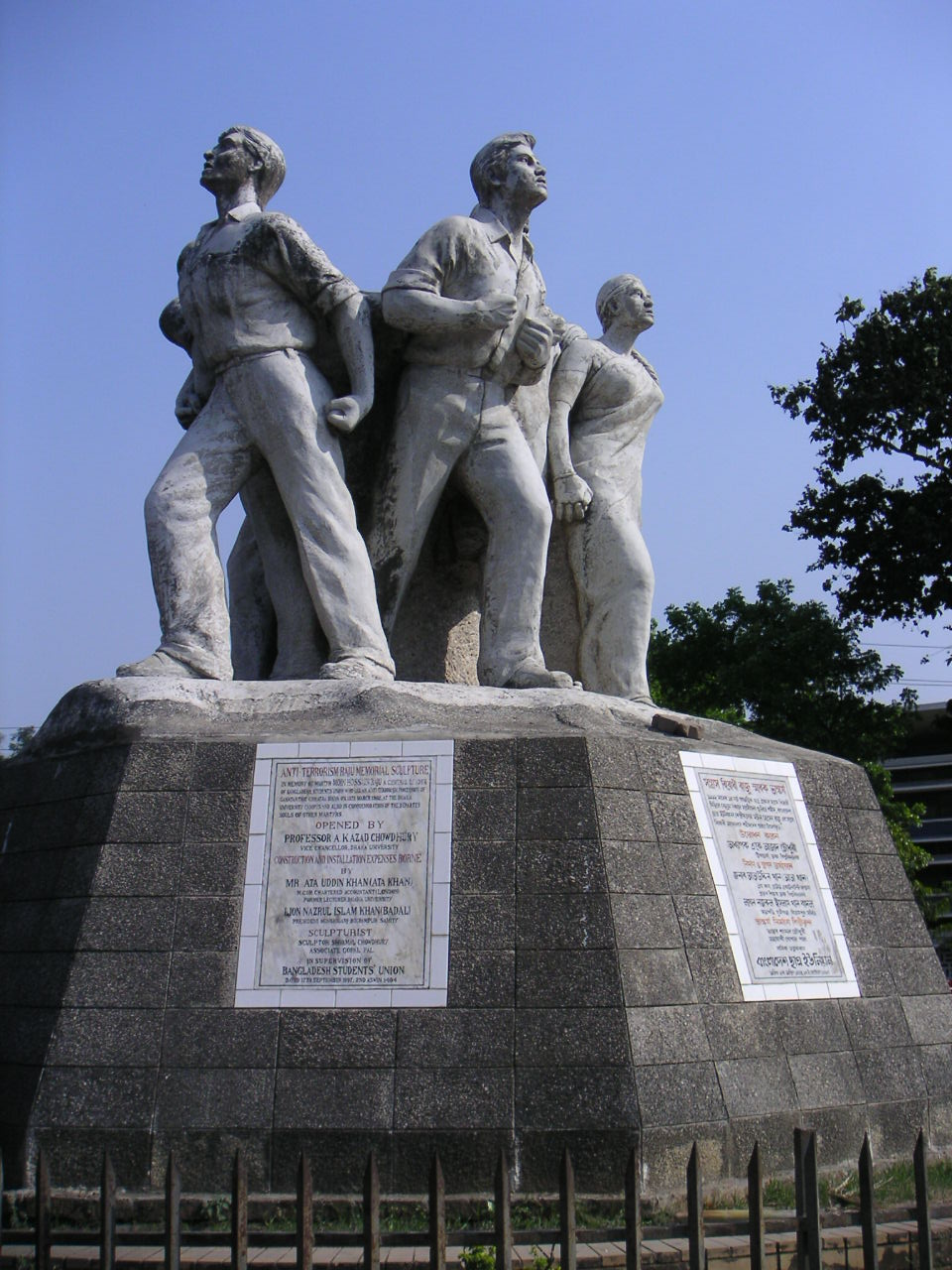
Anti Terrorism Raju Memorial Sculpture, a statue in the Dhaka University campus, erected in the memory of Raju, an activist of Students' Union

Bangladesh Students' Union (Bengali: বাংলাদেশ ছাত্র ইউনিয়ন, abbreviated as BSU) is a left-wing student organization in Bangladesh. The organization was established on 26 April 1952. During the Independence War of Bangladesh, the organization had its guerrilla force. Although the organization claims to be independent, it is known as the mass organization of the Communist Party of Bangladesh.

== Goals ==
The organization has been advocating for a non-discriminatory, science-based, non-communal, and progressive educational policy. The Students' Union believes that addressing the challenges in the educational journey and establishing the supremacy of students' rights require eliminating exploitation and inequality from society.

== History ==
In April 1952, a regional conference was held in Dhaka to address the challenges and issues posed by the Bengali language movement, where the decision was made to form a united student organization focusing on unity among all students, irrespective of nationality, religion, and caste. The decision aimed at fostering a collective consciousness with an anti-communal, democratic, anti-imperialist, and progressive political awareness. As a result, on 26 April 1952, the East Pakistan Students' Union was established in Dhaka based on the principles of unity, education, peace, and progress.

The founding leaders of this organization were Kazi Anwarul Azim and Syed Abdus Sattar. Later, in December 1952, at the first conference, Mohammad Sultan was elected as the president, and Mohammad Elias as the general secretary. It was during this conference that the organization's declaration and constitution were announced.

At its birth, the organization was named "Pakistan Students' Union." However, during the first conference in December 1952, the decision was made to establish a separate organization based on East Pakistan, as the two regions of undivided Pakistan had major distinctions in economy, social awareness, culture, and heritage. Consequently, the organization was formed with a focus on East Pakistan, and its name was changed to "East Pakistan Students' Union." After the independence of Bangladesh, the organization adopted the current.

=== Independence War ===
In February 1971, in an emergency council of the East Pakistan Students' Union, 14 demands were presented regarding democracy. It stated, "The original five language-speaking nations in Pakistan, to separate them from the Federation of Pakistan and establish an independent sovereign state with complete autonomy rights and self-determination."

In February 1971, during the tenth congress of the International Union of Students held in Europe, specifically in the then Czechoslovakia (present-day Slovakia, with its capital in Bratislava), representatives of the Students' Union from Bangladesh presented the just demands and struggles of the people of East Pakistan. This significant event had the participation of student representatives from over a hundred countries globally.

On 1 March 1971, in response to the cancellation of the parliamentary session, the Students' Union organized a protest rally near Baitul Mukarram Mosque and a nationwide strike on 2 March. From the beginning of March, student gatherings were organized daily at the Central Shaheed Minar, where the ongoing events and political circumstances were briefed. Following the 7 March Speech of Sheikh Mujibur Rahman, the Students' Union started their preparations for a prolonged struggle for the independence of East Pakistan. At the University of Dhaka's central field, the Students' Union initiated military drills and weapons training, including handling dummy rifles, starting each morning. Female activists of the organization also participated in this training. Separate brigades were formed in the names of the martyrs and revolutionaries, each taking political responsibilities alongside receiving military training, including guerrilla warfare.

Furthermore, the Students' Union, from its side, conducted extensive political campaigns in districts and primary branches. They organized the Mukti Bahini in rural areas. In the villages, they instigated movements among farmers, and under the coordination of the Mukti Bahini, regular parade programs were conducted. On the night of 25 March 1971, leaders of the Dhaka University unit of Students' Union, including Aajim and Shushil, along with several others, were killed by Pakistani forces in Operation Searchlight.

On 6 May 1971, a press conference was held in New Delhi by the Students' Union regarding the Independence War. The conference highlighted the overall situation of the genocide and the resistance struggle, creating widespread awareness internationally. After the commencement of the war, this was the first kind of press conference in favor of Bangladesh, where detailed descriptions of the atrocities and genocide by the Pakistani military were provided.

On 10 May 1971, the International Union of Students (IUS) and the World Federation of Democratic Youth (WFDY), along with other international student and youth organizations from all countries, sent letters urging support and cooperation for Bangladesh's independence and the Independence War. Subsequently, student and youth organizations worldwide swiftly started expressing support for Bangladesh's independence and the Independence War, initiating widespread solidarity.

In May, as part of the Students' Union's initiative, a special guerrilla force was formed in collaboration with the National Awami Party (Muzaffar) and the Communist Party of Bangladesh to manage and conduct the war. On 28 May, near Salonibari, Assam, training commenced. After the training, under the leadership of the Operation Planning Committee, the induction of guerrillas within the country, along with guerrilla operations and military coordination, was initiated.

By the end of September, this special force was engaged in small-scale operations. The number of operations increased in October and November. Successful campaigns were conducted one after another in areas such as Raipur, Monohardi, Shibpur, Comilla, Noakhali, Chittagong, and greater Barisal. On 11 November, a fierce battle took place between the guerrilla force and the Pakistani forces in the bordering Betia of Cumilla. In this battle, 9 guerrilla fighters, including Students' Union leader Nizamuddin Azad, Sirajul Monir, and Shahidullah Saud, died.

=== Protests for Vietnam Liberation ===
Bangladesh Students Union and members of other left-leaning student organizations decided to hold a rally in support of Vietnam independence and showing solidarity with North Vietnam in the war on 1 January 1973.

On the day of the rally, after the planned students' gathering at Bot Tola, students were moving in rally to give a memorandum to the American Embassy at Dhaka. The police tried to disperse the protesters and fired on the rally. Bangladesh Students Union activists Matiul Islam and Mirza Kaderul Islam died in the police firing, and many students were seriously injured. This incident got coverage in the daily newspapers of Bangladesh of that time, including the Dainik Bangla. The incident instigated the students into starting another movement against this brutality. Under pressure, Sheikh Mujib's government sought apology and accepted demands of the students, later, in which, recognizing Provisional Revolutionary Government of the Republic of South Vietnam was included as a point of demands. Accordingly, the Bangladesh government recognised the Revolutionary Government and became the first South Asian and second Asian country to recognize the Revolutionary Government of South Vietnam on 11 February 1973.

Bangladesh Students Union observes Anti-imperialism Solidarity Day every year, commemorating the martyrs of this incident.

=== Present day ===
The Union participated in the July Uprising in 2024, which successfully ousted Sheikh Hasina from power.

== Controversy ==
On 17 January 2025, Meghmallar Basu, president of the Students' Union, Dhaka University, faced criticism for a social media post calling for "Red Terror". The post sparked widespread debate and was condemned by various political and social groups, intensifying tensions within student politics. Critics argued that such rhetoric promoted political violence, while supporters maintained that it was a symbolic call for resistance against oppression. The students drew a portrait of Siraj Sikder, a Bangladeshi Maoist militant, beside the picture of Sheikh Mujibur Rahman months ago before this statement was made by Meghmallar Basu. This portrait was attacked by a group of students whose political ideology remains unverified. The graffiti was later restored, however, by students of the Bangladesh Students Union.

On 11 March 2025, members of the Students' Union, along with other leftist organizations, were accused of attacking police officers without provocation during an anti-rape march. The protest, initially organized to demand justice for victims of sexual violence, escalated into clashes with law enforcement. Following the incident, authorities filed a case against 12 individuals, including Meghmallar Basu and Adrita Roy, a student leader of Students' Union, Jahangirnagar University, on charges of violence and public disorder.

== See also ==
- Student politics of Bangladesh
- List of student organizations in Bangladesh
- Bangladesh Students Federation
