= National Awami Party (Muzaffar) =

Political party in Bangladesh

National Awami Party (Muzaffar) ন্যাশনাল আওয়ামী পার্টি
- Abbreviation: NAP(M)
- Chairperson: Ivy Ahmed
- General Secretary: Muhammad Ali Faruque
- Founder: Muzaffar Ahmed
- Founded: 26 March 1971
- Registered: 3 November 2008
- Split from: NAP (Wali)
- Ideology: Democratic socialism; Progressivism; Anti-imperialism; Secularism (Bangladeshi); Historically: Communism; Marxism
- Political position: Left-wing

Election symbol
- Hut

Party flag
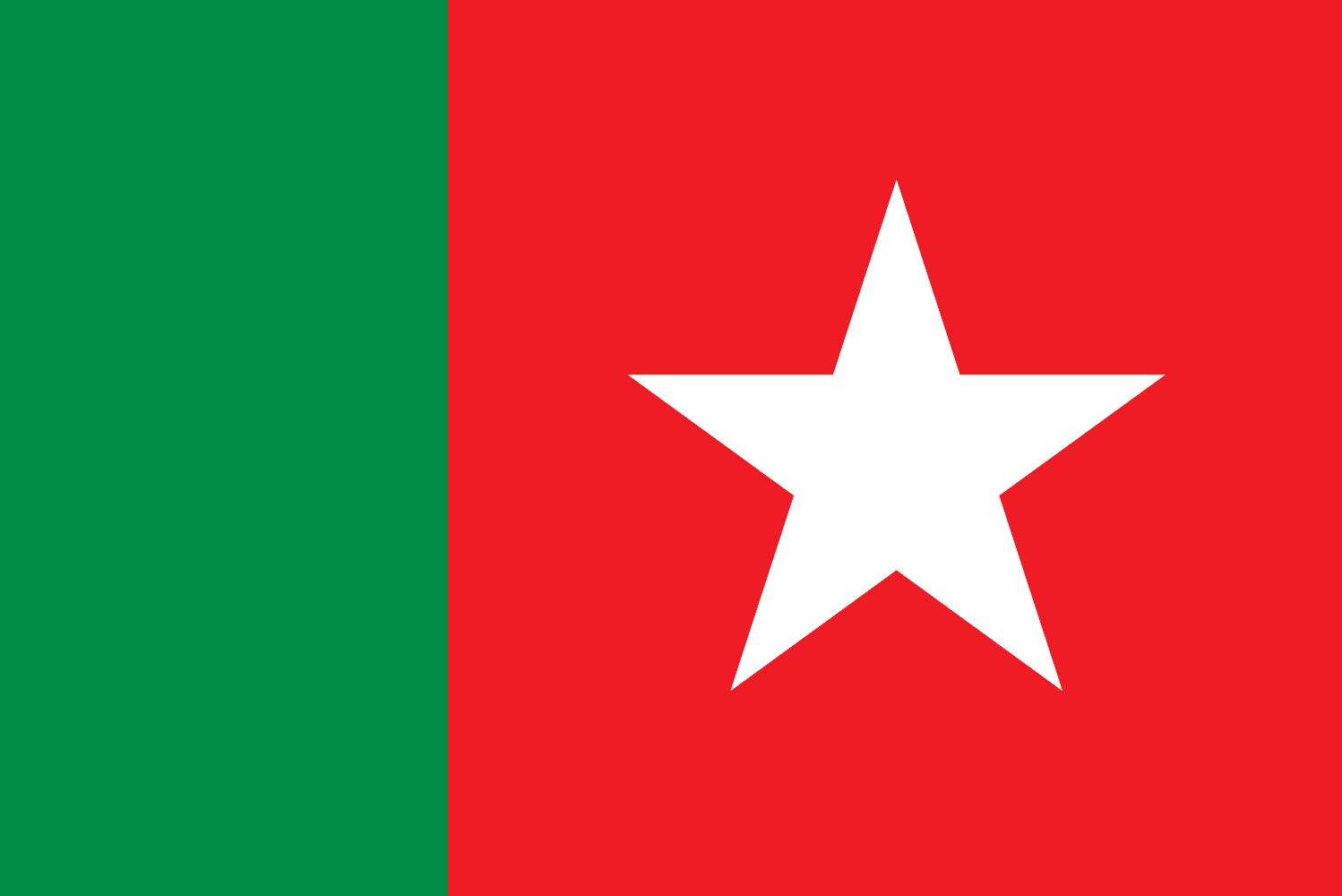

The National Awami Party (Muzaffar), is a left-wing political party in Bangladesh.

== History ==
National Awami Party (Muzaffar) traces its origin to a split of the National Awami Party into two factions, one pro-China and one pro-Moscow. The pro-Moscow fraction was National Awami Party (Wali), led by Khan Abdul Wali Khan, and the pro-China was called National Awami Party (Bhashani), led by Abdul Hamid Khan Bhashani. Muzaffar Ahmed was a leader of the National Awami Party (Wali) in East Pakistan. After the independence of Bangladesh in 1971, the East Pakistan branch of National Awami Party (Wali) became an independent party; the National Awami Party (Muzaffar).

The party participated in the Bangladesh Liberation War, through the NAP–Communist Party–Students' Union Special Guerrilla Forces, for which Muzaffar served as an organizer.

A protest led by the party during the 1990 Bangladesh mass uprising that overthrew Hussain Muhammad Ershad's military regime.

The NAP (Muzaffar) won a single seat in the 1991 Bangladeshi general election when Md. Abdul Hafiz beat Jatiya Party (Ershad) candidate Kazi Faruque Kader by 103 votes in the Nilphamari-4 constituency. The party has not won a seat in any general election since.

== Electoral registry ==
The party is registered with the Bangladesh Election Commission as "Bangladesh National Awami Party", and its election symbol is a house. The central party office is located in Dhanmondi Hawkers Market, Dhaka.

== Electoral performance ==
Election	Party leader	Votes		Seats			Position		Government
Election	Party leader	In number	%	Contested	Won	+/–	(Seats)	(Votes)	Government
1973	Muzaffar Ahmed	1,569,299	8.32%	223 / 300	0 / 300	N/A	N/A	2nd	Extra-parliamentary
1979	Muzaffar Ahmed	432,514	2.24%	89 / 300	1 / 300	▲1	▲8th	▼6th	Opposition
1986	Muzaffar Ahmed	202,520	0.71%	9 / 300	2 / 300	▲1	▼11th	▼9th	Opposition
1988	Muzaffar Ahmed	Boycotted				▼2	N/A	N/A	Extra-parliamentary
1991	Muzaffar Ahmed	259,978	0.76%	31 / 300	1 / 300	▲1	▲9th	▲10th	Opposition
1996 (Feb)	Muzaffar Ahmed	Boycotted				▼1	N/A	N/A	Extra-parliamentary
1996	Muzaffar Ahmed	3,620	0.01%	13 / 300	0 / 300	0	N/A	▼25th	Extra-parliamentary
2001	Muzaffar Ahmed	3,801	0.01%	3 / 300	0 / 300	0	N/A	▲19th	Extra-parliamentary
2008	Muzaffar Ahmed	24,141	0.03%	14 / 300	0 / 300	0	N/A	▼22nd	Extra-parliamentary
2014	Muzaffar Ahmed	7,120	0.04%	6 / 300	0 / 300	0	N/A	▲8th	Extra-parliamentary
2018	Muzaffar Ahmed	8,367	0.01%	9 / 300	0 / 300	0	N/A	▼30th	Extra-parliamentary
2024	Ivy Ahmed	2,480	0.01%	5 / 300	0 / 300	Steady	N/A	▲25th	Extra-parliamentary
2026	Ivy Ahmed	Boycotted				0	N/A	N/A	Extra-parliamentary
