= Adamjee Cantonment College =

College in Dhaka, Bangladesh

- আদমজী ক্যান্টনমেন্ট কলেজ
- Logo of Adamjee Cantonment College

Location
- Dhaka Cantonment, Dhaka - 1206; Bangladesh; 23.7946°N 90.3933°E

Information
- Type: Intermediate, undergraduate and post graduate college
- Motto: শিক্ষা, শৃঙ্খলা, নৈতিকতা (Education, discipline, morality)
- Established: 16 February 1960; 66 years ago
- Founder: Gul Muhammad Adamjee
- School board: Board of Intermediate and Secondary Education, Dhaka
- Authority: Bangladesh Army
- Principal: Brigadier General Md Shahan Sadi , ndc , psc,Mphil
- Staff: 114
- Faculty: 3
- Teaching staff: 110 (permanent)
- Grades: Class XI-XII, honours and masters
- Gender: co-ed
- Age range: 14-25
- Enrollment: 6,500
- Language: Bengali and English
- Campus size: 9.96 acre
- Campus type: Urban
- Colors: White and Grey
- Nickname: ACC
- Yearbook: প্রতীতি
- Affiliation: National University, Bangladesh
- Demonym: Adamjeeans
- Website: www.acc.edu.bd

Adamjee Cantonment College (Bengali: আদমজী ক্যান্টনমেন্ট কলেজ) also known as ACC is an educational institution in Dhaka Cantonment, Dhaka, Bangladesh. The institution was established in 1960 following the ideology of the public schools of England. It is managed by the Bangladesh Army, established primarily for the children of army personnel. But civilian students can also study in this college.

== History ==
On 16 February 1960, Adamjee Cantonment College started its journey as an English-medium school founded by Gul Muhammad Adamjee (son of Sir Adamjee Haji Dawood, founder of Adamjee Group). The institution was later renamed Adamjee Cantonment College. A public school attached to the college served students through the first to tenth grade. The school and college were separated in 1995 and made totally independent institutions.

== Extracurricular activities ==
The college is noteworthy for its extracurricular activities which are performed by students that fall outside the realm of the normal curriculum of college education. Examples include hosting science festivals and Model United Nations (MUN) assemblies, participating in debate competitions and sports tournaments. and so on.

The college holds annual sports competitions that help students develop mental and physical toughness.

== Photo gallery ==
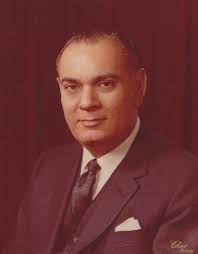
Gul Muhammad Adamjee, founder of the college

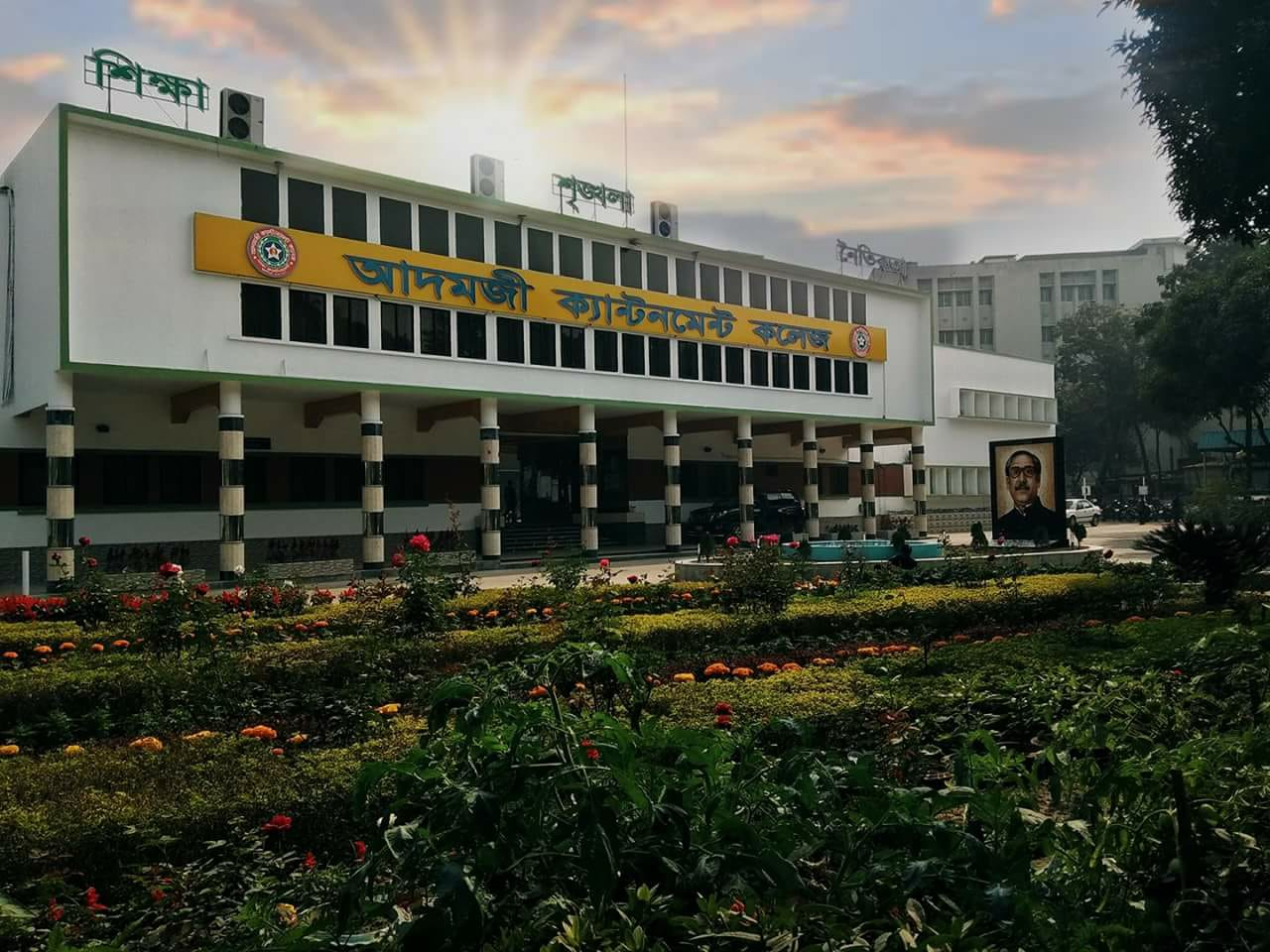
Front View of Adamjee Cantonment College

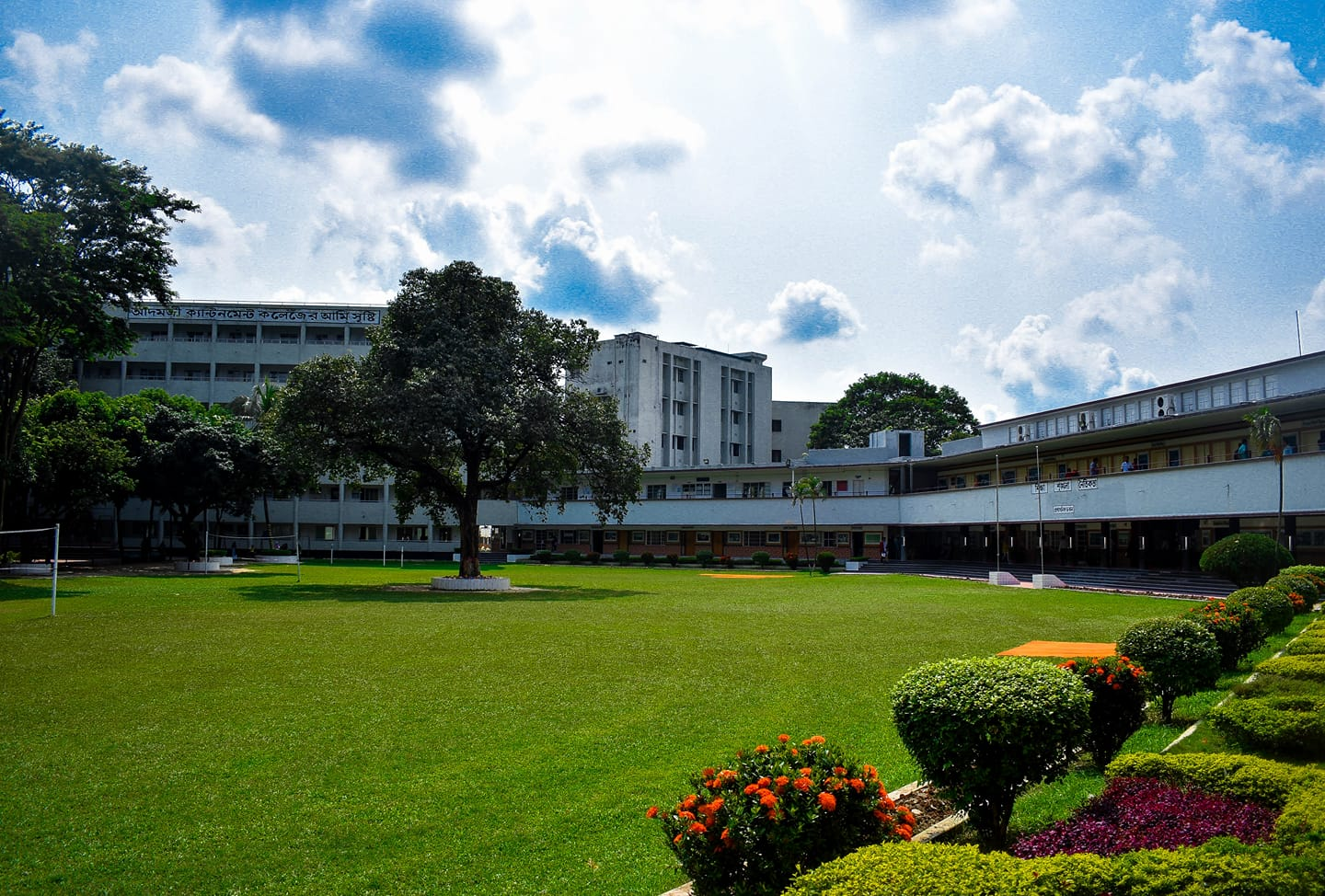
Inner View of Adamjee Cantonment College

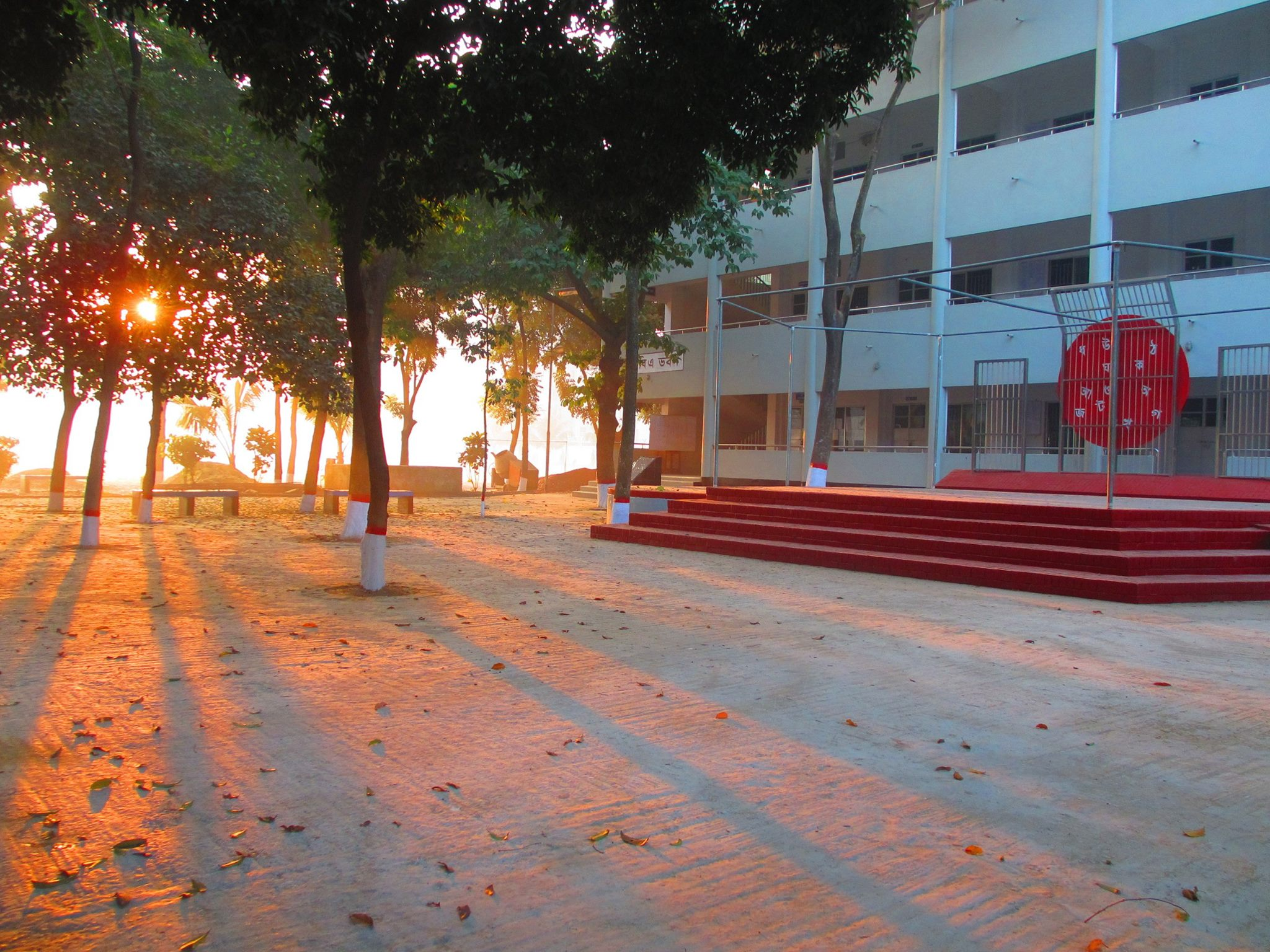
Shaheed Rumi Moncho

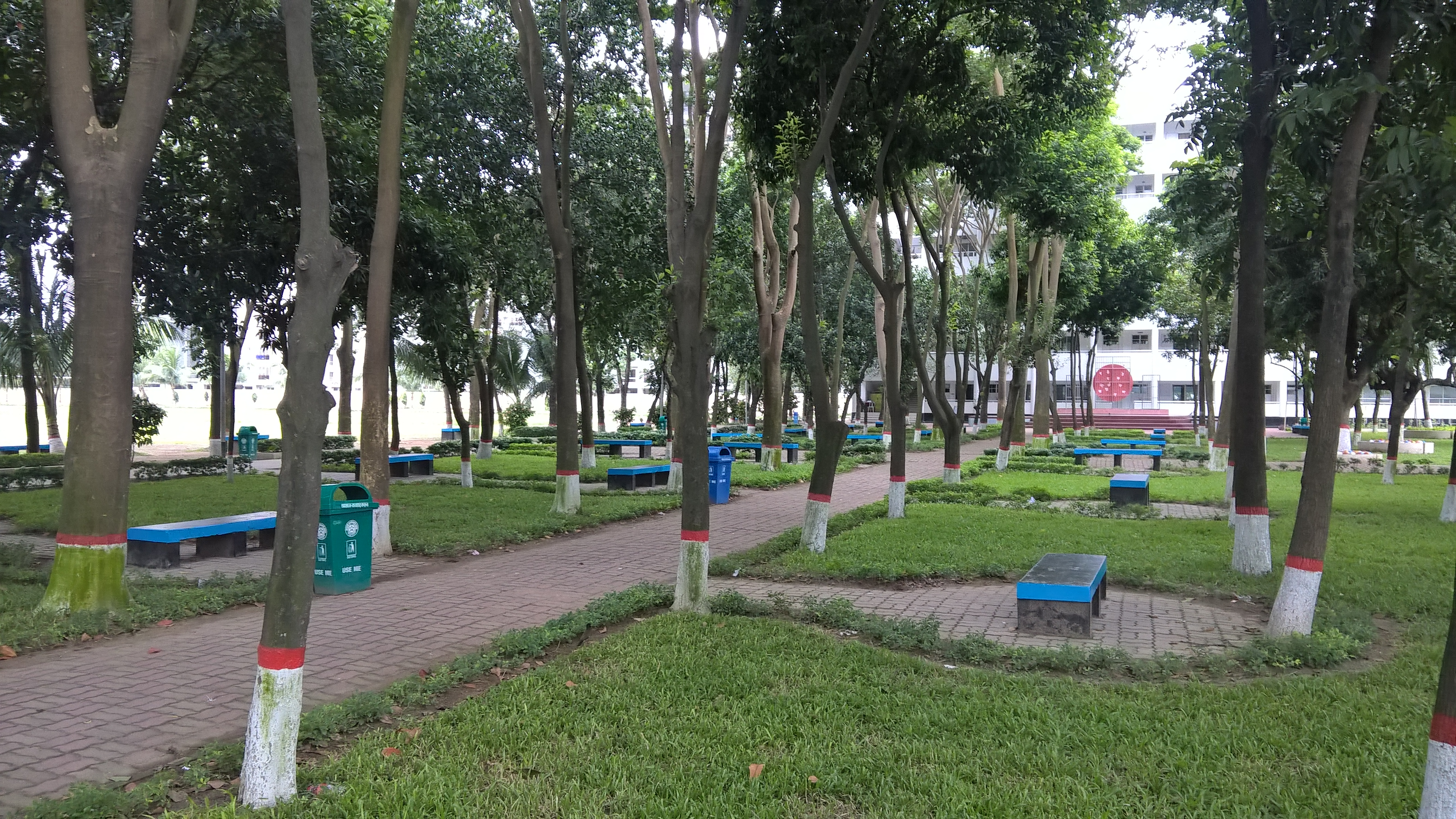
College Garden

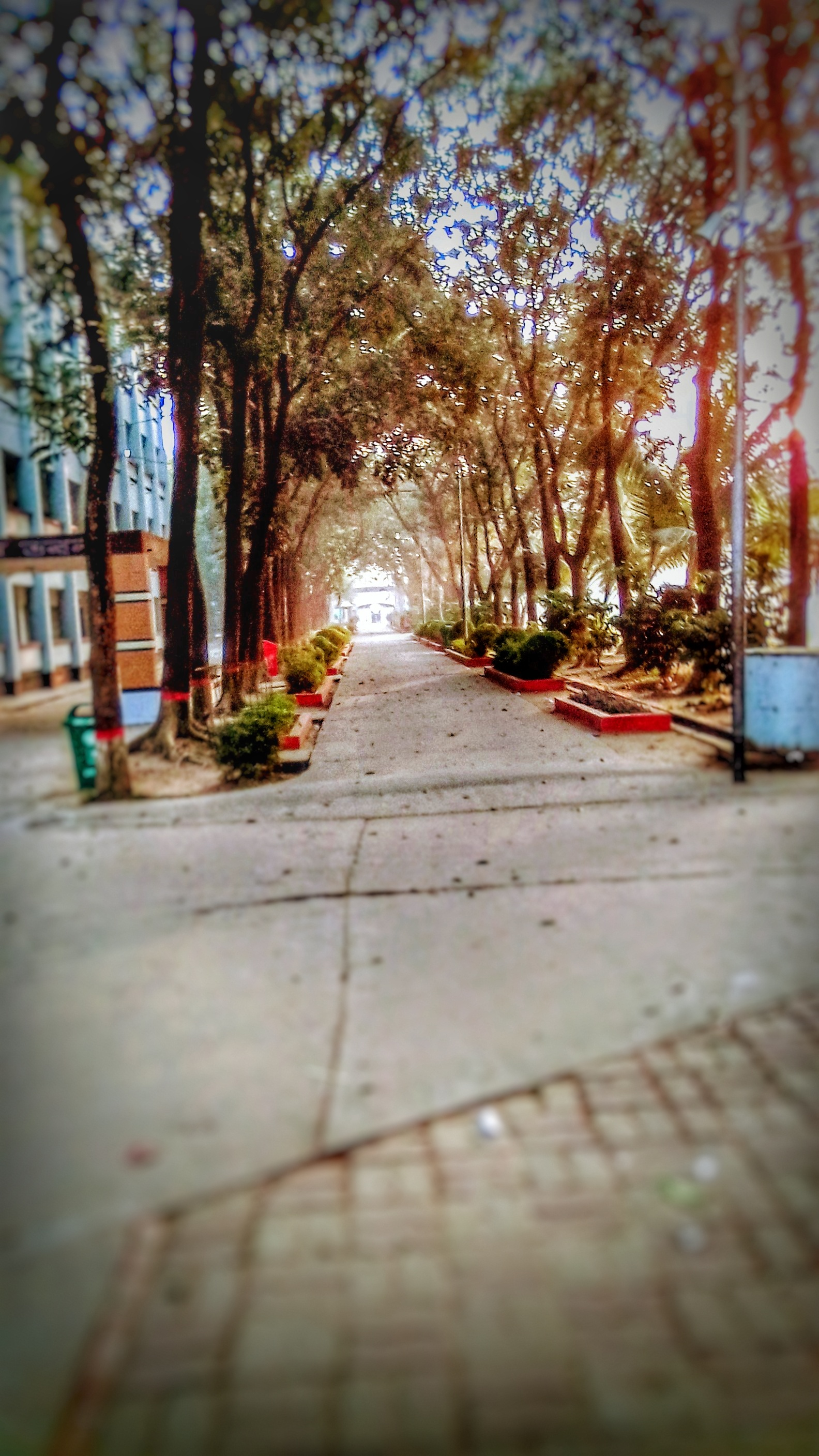
A winter morning in the college premises

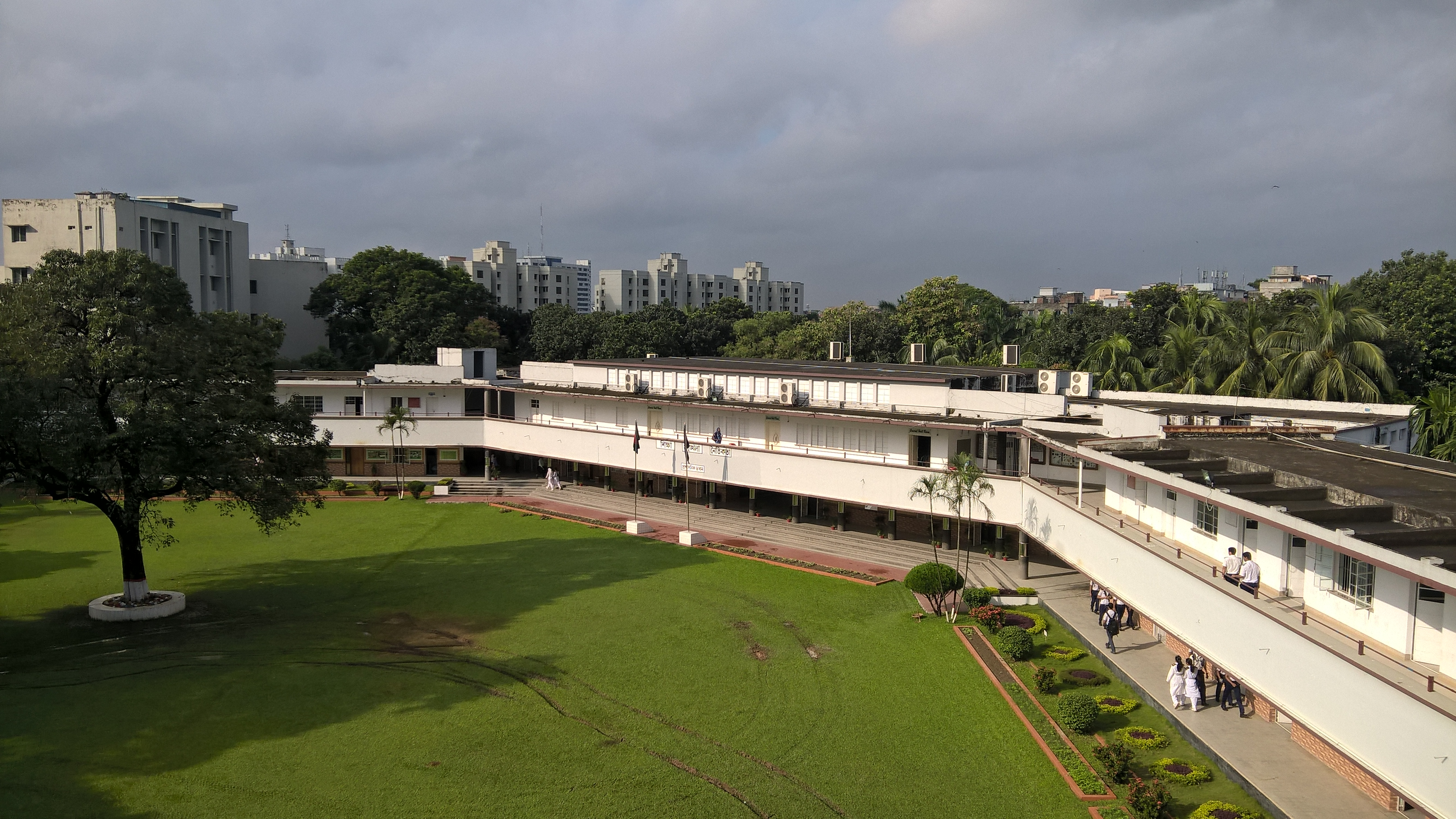
Campus of Adamjee Cantonment College

== Notable alumni ==
- Tarique Rahman, Prime minister of Bangladesh and Chairman of the Bangladesh Nationalist Party
- Col Mohammad Mojibul Haque, martyred in Bangladesh Rifles revolt, in charge of Operation Dal-Bhaat and the then Dhaka sector commander of BDR.
- Sayed Farooq-ur-Rahman, freedom fighter in the Liberation War of Bangladesh, Lieutenant Colonel in the Bangladesh Army who organized the 15 August 1975 Bangladeshi coup d'état, and later founded The Freedom Party, Bangladesh running against Hussain Muhammad Ershad in the 1986 Presidential Election.
- Salman Shah, Bangladeshi film actor
- Ayman Sadiq, Bangladeshi education entrepreneur and founder of 10 Minute School
- Asif Mahmud, Former Adviser to the Interim government of Bangladesh and a Coordinator of the Anti-discrimination Students Movement
- Md. Mofizul Islam, Former Senior Secretary, Government of Bangladesh and Former Chairperson of Bangladesh Competition Commission
- Chowdhury Abdullah Al-Mamun, Bangladesh Police officer and former Inspector General of Bangladesh Police
- Monir Khan Shimul, Model.
- Moin Hossen Raju.
- Piash Karim, sociologist and political commentator
- Shafi Imam Rumi, freedom fighter and martyr in the Liberation War of Bangladesh
- Tareque Masud, Bangladeshi film director
- Ferdous Ahmed, Bangladeshi film actor and producer
- Tony Dias, Bangladeshi television actor and director
- Jon Kabir, Singer, model and actor.
- Shariar Nazim Joy, actor and writer.

== See also ==
- BAF Shaheen College Kurmitola
- BAF Shaheen College Dhaka
- Holy Cross College, Dhaka
- St. Joseph Higher Secondary School
