= Sayed Farooq-ur-Rahman =

Bangladeshi army officer (1946–2010)

- সৈয়দ ফারুকুর রহমান
- Born: 9 August 1946; Naogaon, Bengal Province, British India
- Died: 28 January 2010 (aged 63); Dhaka Central Jail, Dhaka Division, Bangladesh
- Cause of death: Execution by hanging
- Resting place: Rajshahi, Bangladesh
- Citizenship: Bangladeshi
- Education: Adamjee Cantonment College; Pakistan Military Academy
- Occupation: Army Officer
- Known for: Assassination of Sheikh Mujibur Rahman
- Political party: Freedom Party
- Spouse: Farida Khan
- Children: 4
- Military career
- Allegiance: Pakistan (Before 1971); Bangladesh
- Branch: Pakistan Army; Bangladesh Army
- Service years: 1966-1979
- Rank: Lieutenant Colonel
- Unit: Armoured Corps
- Commands: Deputy Commander of S Force; CO of 1st Bengal Lancers; CO of 12th Lancers

Sayed Farooq-ur-Rahman (Bengali: সৈয়দ ফারুকুর রহমান, romanized: Soiẏod Fārukur rohomān; better known as Colonel Farooq; 9 August 1946 – 28 January 2010) was a Bangladeshi army officer and politician.

He was the leader and architect of the revolt by army personnel of the then-nascent Bangladesh to assassinate Sheikh Mujibur Rahman, a main figure in the 1971 Bangladesh Liberation War and the country's first President. Farooq and other organizers of the coup d'état installed Khandakar Mostaq Ahmad in power under the premise that he would rule in accordance to Islamic law, though this premise was later broken by Mostaq. He was second-in-command of the 1st Bengal Lancers Regiment and a major of the Bangladesh Army at the time of the coup whereupon he was promoted to Lieutenant Colonel. Farooq would found the Bangladesh Freedom Party in 1981 with his allies and go on to run for president against Hussain Muhammad Ershad in 1986, though the election was boycotted by other major parties. Upon the return of power to the Bangladesh Awami League under the leadership of Sheikh Hasina in the late 1990s, Farooq was arrested and convicted, leading to his execution on 28 January 2010, along other coup members such as Bazlul Huda and Sultan Shahriar Rashid Khan.

== Early life and education ==
Dewan Sayed Farooq-ur-Rahman was born on 9 August 1946 into an aristocratic family in his paternal ancestral village of Marma-Malikpur Dewan Para to Sayed Ataur Rahman and Mahmuda Khatun. (Note: Multiple references:) His father, Sayed Ataur Rahman, was a physician who was a member of the Indian Medical Service and then successively the Pakistan Army Medical Corps after the Partition of the Subcontinent, he was awarded with the military rank of Major for his years of service. He belonged to a prominent family of Sufi heritage, the Dewan family of Marma-Malikpur in Barshail Union, Naogaon Sadar, one of the Pir families of the Rajshahi region. The progenitor of the family was Sayyid Ali Al-Aydarus, an 18th-century Hadhrami missionary from the Ba 'Alawi sada known to the local populace by the appellation Zinda Pir, meaning living saint, due to him being known for his fiery temperament. Farooq was a ninth generation descendant of him. Farooq's paternal grandfather Dewan Sayed Ishratullah Edrusi, was the Inspector of Naogaon Sadar Police Station during British India and was also later a Sufi figure in Naogaon, also called Zinda Pir by his followers in honor of his forefathers. (Note: Multiple references:)

Farooq's mother was Mahmuda Khatun, who belonged to a wealthy and well-connected zamindar family in Jamalpur District in Mymensingh, the family traces their origins to mercenaries of Turkic extraction under the Mughal emperors. (Note: Multiple references:) Farooq's maternal grandfather, Abdul Latif Khan was also a member of the British Indian police service like his paternal grandfather. The youngest brother of his mother, Mahmuda Khatun, was the pioneer of the export-oriented ready-made garment industry in Bangladesh, Noorul Quader Khan. From his maternal family's relations, Farooq was related to several reputed figures in the politics and civil service of Bengal at the time including Khaled Mosharraf who served as the fourth Chief of Army Staff of Bangladesh, Rashed Mosharraf who was Member of Parliament for the Jamalpur-2 constituency, Ataur Rahman Khan who was the chief minister of East Pakistan and Azizur Rahman Mallick, the famed historian and educationist, and Syed Nazrul Islam, acting president of Bangladesh during the 1971 liberation war.

Farooq was the oldest child and only son of his parents, he had two younger sisters. One of these sisters, Yasmin Rahman would be a pioneering pilot of Bangladesh and the first female commander of Biman Airlines. (Note: Multiple references:) Sayed Farooq-ur-Rahman's schooling days were largely centred upon the postings of his father, who at the time was serving as an army doctor for the Pakistan Army, thus leading to Farooq attending several different schools in both West Pakistan and East Pakistan. Reflective of the location of his father's postings, Farooq had changed schools, a total of six times within thirteen years. He started off his primary education in the year of 1952, aged six at the Fatima Jinnah Girls School in Comilla, about which Farooq joked as being his 'one and only time in a convent.' He also then attended Army Burn Hall College in Abbottabad, a selective school administered by the Pakistan Army Education Corps. He would switch to St. Joseph High School in Dhaka, then Station Road School in Rawalpindi where the daughter of the second President of Pakistan, Ayub Khan was also studying. He also studied at St. Francis' Grammar School in Quetta, and Adamjee Cantonment College in Dhaka where he graduated with his Higher Secondary Certificate as a science student in 1964, obtaining a second-class. (Note: Multiple references:) He would finish his academic education at a college at Kohat where he completed at crash-course in Mathematics. Farooq had a passion for aviation since a young age, this led him to gaining a solo-pilot licence aged seventeen, afterwards, he attempted to join the Pakistan Airforce but was unsuccessful at doing so. Farooq also had enthusiasm for gymnastics in his youth, he had earned a color in East Pakistan Gymnastics in 1964. Seeing his deep interest in aircraft, his parents had him admitted for a bachelor's degree in Aeronautical Engineering at Bristol University in the United Kingdom for the 1966 intake.

However, Farooq being caught up in the vehement emotions of patriotism, present in much of those of his age during the nascent post-British era in the Indian Subcontinent, was not deterred by his rejection by the Pakistan Airforce, had still desired to join the Pakistan army. This desire intensified after hostility between Pakistan and India had emerged after political and armed conflict known as Operation Desert Hawk in the Great Rann of Kutch. Farooq while on his usual path to college in Kohat, had decided to take a different turn, diverting to the Inter-services Selection Board office where he had volunteered to receive a commission from the Pakistan army recruitment authorities. He was a granted a commission in a call by the authorities around a week later, he had initially faced opposition in following his inner-aspirations from his mother who did not want to lose her only son to army-service, yet Farooq was finally allowed by his parents to join the army after his father had given his consent. Farooq would later claim that he was the first second-generation Bengali officer in the Pakistan army since his father had too served as a medical officer. (Note: Multiple references:)

== Career ==
=== Pakistan ===
Farooq after receiving parental permission, ended up at the Pakistan Military Academy in Risalpur in the year of 1966, where he had quickly distinguished himself from other cadets who had volunteered for a commission by becoming appointed to the position of battalion sergeant major which had allowed him to have some initial level of seniority amongst his fellow starting cadets. He eventually had graduated from the Pakistan Military Academy ranking as fourth out of two hundred and ninety-seven cadets and was awarded with being able to choose between modes of service in the army. (Note: Multiple references:) He was recommended by then-Major Ziaur Rahman and his maternal uncle, then-Major Khaled Mosharraf, who were working as instructors in the Pakistan Military Academy, that he should join the Bengal Regiment troops. Farooq however respectfully turned down these suggestions, saying that he did not desire to do "footslogging in the army", choosing to join the armoured corps instead, resulting in his appointment to the 13th Lancers of the Pakistan Army, where he started off as a second lieutenant, the most junior rank given to commissioned officers starting off their careers as a probation.

Farooq would later be transferred into the 31st Cavalry based in Sialkot in the later months of 1970 being aged twenty-four, he would become a captain and acting squadron commander of the Charlie Squadron also known as the C-Squadron which was equipped with M36B2 Tank Destroyers and thus became associated with the command-chain of the armoured corps in the Pakistan Army. This success and career-progression of Farooq was to be attributed with him topping his tactical armour course with a B+, his advanced radio training course with an A+ and his basic armour-officer course with a B+. (Note: Multiple references:) In October 1970, Farooq received a letter from his commanding officer that he had been seconded to Abu Dhabi in the Trucial States in Arabia where the Pakistan government had made a pact that their armed forces will be assisting in the training and servicing the forces of Sheikh Zayed bin Sultan Al-Nahyan. In Abu Dhabi, Farooq became a squadron commander in the Abu Dhabi Armoured Regiment (ADDF) based near the port of Jabal Dhanna during 1971 when political tension between Western and Eastern factions of Pakistan had become catalysed at an increasing rate. (Note: Multiple references:)

Farooq lived a relaxed life during his tenure as a military officer in the Trucial States, military duties which were his sole purpose and work upon his secondment by the Pakistan Army authorities only took up a fraction of his time. He would spend the rest of his time pursuing his passion for military history and tactics by reading volumes of such-related texts, he would also be entertained by driving fast cars, he had purchased an Opel Commodore GS which he would "tear along the desert roads at a hundred miles per hour." One day in the middle of June in 1971, as he was spending time in the British officers' dining, he encountered a bundle of newspapers, amongst them was the Sunday Times which contained an excerpt by Anthony Mascarenhas which detailed the genocide that the Pakistani forces, predominately composed of Punjabis and Pashtuns, were committing against ethnic Bengali civilians in then-East Pakistan after the general electoral victory of Sheikh Mujibur Rahman of the Awami League, based in then-East Pakistan over Zulfikar Ali Bhutto of the Peoples' Party, based in then-West Pakistan. After reading this Farooq after a moment of deep thought, decided he could no longer serve in the Pakistan Army, he left Dubai Airport going towards London, eventually reaching Bengal. He would then become involved in the Bangladesh Liberation War when it was in its final phase in which he was involved in forming and by de facto led the 1st Bengal Lancers, Bangladesh's first armoured regiment and its only one in its nascent era. (Note: Multiple references:) He was also the 12th commander of the East Bengal Regiment. After the liberation war, Farooq was raised from Captain to the rank of Major.

=== Bangladesh ===
In 1974, Rahman was placed in charge of recovering weapons in Demra, Munshiganj District, Narayanganj District, and Narsingdi District. He had experienced some things that made him critical of the Bangladesh Awami League government. In 1975, Rahman was a major in the Bangladesh Army. He spoke against Mujib to his fellow army officers. He also told them that Mujib would give Bangladesh to India and establish a monarchy in Bangladesh. He and Major Sultan Shahriar Rashid Khan discussed ways of removing Mujib from power and asked Brigadier General Ziaur Rahman for support. Zia expressed his inability to support them. Zia asked them to do what they thought was necessary. They were supported covertly by senior cabinet minister Khondaker Mushtaque Ahmed, who was introduced to Rahman by Major Khandaker Abdur Rashid. On 12 August 1975, he discussed the plans with his fellow officers at his wedding anniversary party at the Officers Club, Dhaka. There the officers finalised 15 August 1975 as the day they would launch the coup. Farooq grew increasingly critical of the premiership of Sheikh Mujibur Rahman, the main leading figure of the Bangladesh Liberation War. Mujib though being acknowledged by political analysts as being a revolutionary that pushed the civilians of Bengal to autonomy, had proved to be an ineffective administrator. (Note: Multiple references:) His governance was marked by the Bangladesh famine of 1974, the cause of it being widely accepted as being the mismanagement of food resources by Mujib and his ministry, this would be the precursor to public discontent with Mujib. (Note: Multiple references:) Mujib being reluctant to believe that this economic disaster was a result of his policies dismissed nine ministers and began transitioning the parliamentary system in which a prime minister leads to a presidential model somewhat similar to the system of governance in the United States by proclaiming a state of emergency on 28 December 1974 which meant that law courts would not be able to intervene in his actions, giving him more power as he believed that his initial delegation of authority to his subordinates was hampering what he claimed to be the intended effectiveness of his policies. (Note: Multiple references:) He also earlier that same year had made several amendments to the constitution which resulted in individuals other than those being part of Bangladesh Krishak Sramik Awami League unable to participate in national politics, thus legitimising his grip on power through legal means, making himself impeachable for life and reducing the National Parliament to an advisory status rather than possessing executive authority. (Note: Multiple references:) Mujib also passed the Special Powers Act, 1974, which allowed the police to detain and torture any citizen for an indefinite amount of time without any charge. (Note: Multiple references:) Farooq in an interview said regarding in particular the Special Powers Act, 1974, "I don't see why I should obey the orders of any Bangladeshi. It does not make a difference whether they're Bangladeshi or a Pakistani or anybody. You cannot tell me to eliminate a citizen. There is supposed to be a rule of law." All of these actions made Mujib unfavourable to ordinary citizens and the army who were being ignored and stripped of funding.

The incident that genuinely incited within Farooq, the emotions of fury and disillusionment, the desire to get rid of Mujib no matter what it takes, had occurred in Tongi. Major Nasser, then a commander of another squadron of the 1st Bengal Lancers had arrested three thugs. Upon interrogation, the officers had the case of a gang-murder, a newly wed bride and groom were travelling in taxi to their home on the outskirts of the town of Tongi, until they were attacked by a gang. The gang had hacked the groom and the taxi-driver to death and abducted the bride who they took to a cottage far away from common sight, and gang-raped her. Her mutilated corpse would later be found on the road near a bridge. The thug would confess that he himself was a member of the gang, and that a police investigation was initiated. The thug then said that the leader of the gang was Mozammel Haque, then chairman of the Tongi Awami League, and later the Minister for Liberation War Affairs until the fall of Sheikh Hasina in the 2024 July uprising. Major Nasser then arrested Haque after seeing that the thug was telling the truth after scanning through police records, taking him to Dhaka for the force of law. Farooq alleged that Haque then offered the team of officers a bribe of three hundred thousand takas for his release, he alleged that Haque smirked saying, "You will anyway have to let me go, either today or tomorrow. So why not take the money and forget about it?" They handed over Haque to the civil authorities and were later confronted with the reality that Haque had been released free of all charges due to the direct intercession of Sheikh Mujibur Rahman. (Note: Multiple references:) Farooq was then filled with dismay along with his colleagues, he said about his state of mind and others, "It seemed as if we were living in a society headed by a criminal organization. It was as if the Mafia had taken over Bangladesh. We were totally disillusioned. Here was the head of government abetting murder and other extreme things from which he was supposed to protect us. This was not acceptable. We decided he must go." Farooq then out of rash thinking wanted to kill Mujib from that they onwards, he would however later calm down and devise a more strategic plan to oust Mujib from power.

== Coup d'états ==
=== 1975 ===
Farooq first began to be shook towards planning an assassination of Sheikh Mujibur Rahman in July 1974 when he was performing his duties in leading the Bravo Squadron of the 1st Bengal Lancers when they were moved from their base in Dhaka to Demra as they were part of "an operation clean-up" of bandits ordered by Mujib. (Note: Multiple references:) At this point of time, Farooq had been pleased to be thinking that Mujib was taking responsibility and care for the day-to-day life of civilians and was allowing the army which he had initially sidelined after the liberation war, to help him in doing so. Near the roundabout on Narayanganj Road, Farooq had arrested a twenty-year-old bandit who affiliated himself with the Awami League, he had openly confessed to killing twenty-one people, upon asking the bandit why he did it, the bandit replied that his chief ordered him to do so, the chief being Mujib himself. Other officers part of the Bravo Squadron were reporting similar cases, whenever they arrested any prominent Awami League member and took them to the police station, there would be a phone call from Dhaka, and they would allow to walk free. Farooq would later say about this operation, 'It meant that we were supposed to root out corruption and malpractices, but we were supposed to stop short of the Awami League. The whole thing was a damn farce.' He also stated in his interview with Anthony Mascarenhas that he had received orders from Shafat Jamil, then Brigade Commander in Dhaka to beat up people aligned with the leftist faction of the opposition such as Maoists, get information and throw them into rivers, Farooq alleged these orders themselves traced back to Mujib. Farooq on the contrary did not comply with these orders, about these leftists, he said, "I was not deeply interested in Marxists, but what impressed me was that these chaps did care for the country. They may have gone the wrong way ideologically, but they had not so far done wrong to the country."

Many others started having similar sentiments towards Sheikh Mujibur Rahman as Farooq as the Awami League’s tenure in governance of a country continued, Farooq recalled, “Everyone was fed up. They were all talking about ideologies, coups, countercoups, Marxism, communism, and the formation of cells. Everywhere there was talk about plots and counterplots.” Though people were aware of Mujib’s intelligence reporting back to him, individuals in the army did not seem to care, especially due to resentment that had built up amongst them after the dismissal of Major Dalim and twenty-one other youthful officers. Allegedly, Mujib himself was aware of these officers wanting to oust him out of authority, but simply dismissed it as sheer swagger from the young officers. Farooq would find himself discussing his ideas with other army officers, including Colonel Amin Ahmed, Major Hafiz, Major Salim, Major Nasir and Squadron Commander Liaquat, however upon discussion he would see that these officers were willing to wait long-term for a solution, whereas he wanted to topple Mujib as soon as possible. Farooq from these discussions did come to realise that he was deficient in knowledge on how politics worked, and so he started reading works about political leaders of the past in other countries. One figure that stood out to him was Sukarno, the first president of Indonesia, a man who led a revolution against Dutch colonialists, but later took on an authoritarian mode, espousing what he referred to as ‘guided democracy’. Farooq saw a mighty resemblance between his and Mujib’s actions. Sukarno himself was deposed in a military coup and put into house-arrest for the rest of his life.

However, Farooq took notice that unlike Sukarno, Mujib had support from different sources, should he have been put into jail, counterforce from pro-Awami League factions of the army would have come to free him. He also took notice that Mujib was a close ally of India, should they have gotten a request from a representative of Mujib for help, they would have sent armed forces to take control, which would have defeated one of his purposes of deposing of Mujib, to rid the country of Indian influence, so he came to conclude that Mujib, somehow had to die. During December 1974, Farooq began to discuss with fellow plotters, his initial plan was to kill Mujib, while he was airborne, they thought of hijacking his private helicopter when he was out of Dhaka, Squadron Commander Liaquat would be on it and would shoot Mujib with an automated pistol, then toss him into a river. This plan was however not executed due to the unpredictability of Mujib’s travel plans. Farooq decided after getting restive, a military coup using armed forces was necessary. Farooq then created a renewed outline of the operation of a coup, he would obviously have Sheikh Mujibur Rahman as the principal target, but he would also need to neutralise senior Awami League figures, Syed Nazrul Islam, Tajuddin Ahmed, and Mansoor Ali, as he considered that they were capable of getting help from India. He would also need to take out of the equation high-ranking military officers, Major General Shafiullah, Chief of Army Staff Ziaur Rahman and Brigadier Khaled Mosharraf, as they could come into swift action against him when he launched the coup. He would also need to get rid of the Jatiya Rakkhi Bahini, Mujib’s own paramilitary forces. Farooq then made a calculated prediction, none of the army officials aforementioned would not rebel against him after the coup, this would prove to be true after Mujib’s assassination, no one showed any resistance whatsoever. Farooq finally decided that three individuals had to be put to death to achieve actual salvaging of the country, they were Sheikh Mujibur Rahman, his nephew Sheikh Fazlul Haque Moni, and his brother-in-law Abdur Rab Serniabat. He decided that these two men were immoral and corrupt and need to face the same fate as Mujib.

Farooq would go to Dhanmondi at ten o’clock every night of the winter, where he would as he recounted, “check Mujib over personally for a period to see exactly what were his movements, his habits, what he did, where he went. I had to firmly establish the pattern of his life.” He was aided in this by the fact that his own troops, the 1st Bengal Lancers provided the night-guard at Mujib’s Dhanmondi bungalow. He would also go to Sheikh Fazlul Haque Moni and Abdur Rab Serniabat’s residences, though he had to squat in the shadows to see what went on in there as his troops were not guarding their houses. He would also stride along Dhaka to calculate distances and depths for his artillery that he planned to use, he had to do this as he was not allowed access to the maps with all the accurate distances on it, present in the Operations Room of Army Headquarters. This would impact Farooq’s health, the officer who had once turned down deployment in the infantry due to ‘footslogging’ concerns, was now suffering from cramps due to all the walking he had to do, he would have to take Diazepam three times a day. All his efforts had accumulated in him being finally ready to launch a coup on 15 February 1975. Farooq then consulted his brother-in-law, Khandakar Abdur Rashid who agreed to his plans. They also discussed who should take power after the deposing of Mujib, they coming to the realisation they do not possess near the administrative calibre required to run a country, and their lack of political support, decided they should delegate authority to a well-established figure who would do what Mujib could not. Farooq and Rashid then turned to Major General Ziaur Rahman, a decorated army officer who commanded great respect in both military and political affairs, and whom Farooq described as being ‘till then, he was not tarnished.’ Farooq after much hassle, managed to book a meeting with Zia on the 20th of March 1975 at 7:30 pm at his residence. Upon meeting Zia, Farooq started discussing the nepotism and instability present in the country, and his desire to change this state, rather than explicitly mentioning his intentions to do a coup, as doing so would have likely resulted in him being detained and put into prison. Zia then allegedly replied, “Yes. Let's go outside and talk.” Farooq then when outside told him that he and others were professional soldiers who served the people, and not an individual, further expressing his dismay at the state of the army and civil administration, and that he wanted to stop it. Ziaur Rahman then told Farooq, “I am sorry I would not like to get involved in anything like this. If you want to do something you junior officers should do it yourself. Leave me out of it.” Zia would later be questioned by Journalist Anthony Mascarenhas about his statement, and he would never confirm nor deny it, when pressured to give an answer, he resorted to trying to keep Mascarenhas out of the country. On the 30th of March 1975, being frustrated by Zia’s response and running out of patience, Farooq sought to launch the coup on Mujib. Yet this time, a lot of his fellow plotters backed out and left Farooq all alone, leading to him to abandon the coup for the time being.

Farooq would then go undercover, he withdrew from any discussion regarding Mujib, and he would go with his wife to every possible social gathering he could go to, just so that people would think that he had given up on the coup. Tactically, Farooq also arranged his wedding anniversary party on the 12th of August 1975, this would serve as a major distraction for the upcoming military operation.

==== Assassination of Sheikh Mujibur Rahman ====
On 14 August 1975, Sayed Farooq-ur-Rahman met Captain Abdul Aziz Pasha, Captain Bazlul Huda, Major Khandaker Abdur Rashid, Major Shariful Haque Dalim, Major S.H.M.B Noor Chowdhury, Major Sultan Shahriar Rashid Khan, Major Rashed Chowdhury, and other officers in his office to finalise the plan. According to the plan, Rahman commanded the tanks of the Bengal Lancers. Mujib was killed in his house by Captain Bazlul Huda and Major Noor on 15 August 1975. Immediately after the killing, the officers rendezvoused at the Bangladesh Betar office, and installed Khondakar Mushtaque Ahmed as the new president of Bangladesh. Khondakar Mushtaque called the assassins Shurjo Shontan (the gallant sons) and passed the Indemnity Ordinance, which protected the assassins from prosecution.

Rahman was promoted to the rank of lieutenant colonel and held a position of power in the new regime until it was overthrown in a counter-coup by pro-Mujib officers led by Maj. Gen. Khaled Mosharraf, who ousted Khondakar Mushtaque. However, the 7 November 1975 coup against Mosharraf by Lt. Col. Abu Taher brought Maj. Gen. Ziaur Rahman to power. Ziaur Rahman was freed by Major Mohiuddin Ahmed. Ziaur Rahman, after assuming power, appointed the assassins in the diplomatic corps in foreign posts with the exception of Sayed Farooq-ur-Rahman and Sultan Shahriar Rashid Khan who refused to accept the diplomatic posts.

=== 1976 ===
Later, in 1976, with the assistance of Air Vice Marshall Tawab, both Farooq and Rashid returned to Bangladesh to launch another coup. They mobilised the Bengal Lancer regiments who had been split between Savar and Bogra. However, they were pinned down by the Dhaka brigade, under Mir Shawkat Ali, in Savar, while they were pinned down by the 6th East Bengal Regiment and 11th division, under Hanan Shah, in Bogra. Eventually, Farooq surrendered and was allowed to leave the country. However, his supporters in Bogra were routed and the Bengal Lancers were disbanded.

In 1979, the Bangladeshi parliament under Ziaur Rahman's Bangladesh Nationalist Party converted the Indemnity ordinance into an official act of parliament. Farooq-ur-Rahman was dismissed from the Bangladesh Army for his role in mutinies in Savar Cantonment and Bogra Cantonment and sent abroad. The assassins were removed from government service after they tried to launch a coup against Ziaur Rahman in 1980.

== 1986 presidential election ==
After the assassination of Ziaur Rahman in 1981, Rahman returned to active politics by founding the Bangladesh Freedom Party and running for the presidency against Lt. Gen. Hussain Muhammad Ershad in 1986. Syed Farooq Rahman, representing the Bangladesh Freedom Party, had run for president against Hussain Muhammad Ershad of the Jatiya Party, and Muhammadullah Hafezzi of the Bangladesh Khilafat Andolan. Sayed Farooq-ur-Rahman had obtained 1,202,303 of the total 21,795,337 votes, 4.64% of the total, coming third out of the twelve other Presidential Candidates. The Oxford-trained lawyer, Kamal Hossain, who was Mujib's law minister, and later foreign minister, told Salil Tripathi, a journalist, "The impunity with which Farooq operated was extraordinary. When he returned to Bangladesh, the government facilitated him and President Hussain Muhammad Ershad, who wanted some candidate to stand against him in the rigged elections. Ershad let Farooq stand to give himself credibility."

== Trial and execution ==
In 1996, the Awami League, under the leadership of Sheikh Mujibur Rahman's daughter, Sheikh Hasina, won the general election and became the Prime Minister of Bangladesh. Under her party's majority, the Indemnity Act was repealed, and a court case was initiated over the killing of Mujib and his family. In August 1996, he was arrested by the Bangladesh Police. In 1998, the Dhaka High Court sentenced Sayed Farooq-ur-Rahman to death. After the Awami League's defeat in the 2001 general election, the BNP government of Begum Khaleda Zia slowed down the proceedings in the Mujib murder case. In October 2007, he filed an appeal with the Bangladesh Supreme Court. After Sheikh Hasina returned to power in 2009, the court case was restarted. He was executed along with other plotters on 28 January 2010.

== Family life and legacy ==
Sayed Farooq-ur-Rahman was married to Farida Khan, a daughter of S. H. Khan, the younger brother of Abul Kashem Khan, a leading industrialist and minister belonging to the politically prominent Khan family of Chittagong. His elder son, Sayed Tariq Rahman, is chairman of the Bangladesh Freedom Party founded by him, Tariq lives and is based in Sydney. His younger son, Sayed Zubair Farooq is a Doctoral graduate in behavioral economics and ethical banking from the University of Technology Sydney, Zubair also served as ministerial financial advisor to Mohammed bin Rashid al-Maktoum.

Farooq had a passion for flying planes, reading books on military history and tactics and driving fast cars.

== See also ==
- Jail Killing Day
- 1st Bengal Lancers
