= Bangladesh Army Armoured Corps =

Armoured Corps
- সাজোয়া বাহিনী
- Active: 1974 — present
- Branch: Bangladesh Army
- Type: Armoured corps
- Garrison/HQ: Bogra Cantonment
- Nickname: King of the Battles
- Colors: Red and Yellow
- Equipment: See list
- Engagements: Military history of Bangladesh

Commanders
- Colonel Commandant: Major General Habib Ullah
- Notable Colonel Commandants: Rashed Amin; Shafiul Haque; Abdus Salam

Bangladesh Army Armoured Corps is one of the military administrative and combat arms of the Bangladesh Army.

== Pre-independence ==
The armoured corps was established properly after the independence of Bangladesh, though the Bengali soldiers and officers of the Pakistan Army fought with the Mukti Bahini during the Bangladesh Liberation War. As per official records of the army, during the war, 57 personnel of armoured corps were killed in action. During the war, a handful of armoured corps personnel won gallantry awards, which includes Major Shariful Haque Dalim (Bir Uttom), Risaldar Moslemuddin Khan (Bir Protik) and Major S. H. M. B. Noor Chowdhury (Bir Bikrom). However, their awards were revoked in 2021 as they had taken part in the Assassination of Sheikh Mujibur Rahman.

== Post independence ==
After the war, the only tank regiment of Bangladesh was 1st Bengal Lancers, having only three outdated tanks. Later, Bangladesh received 30 T-54 tanks from President of Egypt, Anwar Sadat as Sheikh Mujibur Rahman had supported Egypt during the Yom Kippur War and had sent tea to Egypt. One of the earliest units of the armoured corps, 1st Lancers had taken part in the 15 August 1975 Bangladeshi coup d'état, which was later dissolved. The unit had taken part in First Siege of Dhaka and Sipahi–Janata Revolution as well.

== Units ==
The Armoured Corps consists of the following units:

Serial	Unit	Nickname
1	12th Lancers	
2	9th Lancers	
3	6th Cavalry	
4	16th Cavalry	
5	Bengal Cavalry	
6	7th Horse	
7	4th Horse	
8	26th Horse	
9	15th Independent Armoured Squadron	

Apart from these units, the only armoured brigade of Bangladesh, 93rd Armoured Brigade comes under the 11th Infantry Division. The brigade is composed with one armoured unit and two mechanized infantry unit.
