= 1976 Bogra mutiny =

Mutiny of Bangladesh Army soldiers

Date	30 April 1976
Location	Bogra
Status	Defeat of the mutineers

Belligerents
Government; Ministry of Defence; Bangladesh Armed Forces; Bangladesh Army	Opposition; (Bangladesh) 22nd Bengal Regiment; (Bangladesh) Bengal Lancers

Commanders and leaders
(Bangladesh) A. S. M. Sayem (Bangladesh) Ziaur Rahman	M. G. Tawab; S. F. Rahman

The 1976 Bogra mutiny was a rebellion on 30 April 1976 of Bangladesh Army soldiers stationed in Bogra Cantonment.

== Background ==
Sheikh Mujibur Rahman and most of his family were killed in the 15 August 1975 Bangladeshi coup d'état by officers and soldiers of the Bangladesh Army. Khondker Moshtaq Ahmed became president of Bangladesh and praised the killers of Sheikh Mujibur Rahman. The regiments involved in the coup were divided and dispersed to different cantonments around Bangladesh. Officers involved in the coup and killing were given posts in diplomatic missions of Bangladesh.

The Bengal Lancers were directly involved in the coup and killing of Sheikh Mujibur Rahman. They were posted to Bogra Cantonment and their officers were sent into diplomatic posting outside of Bangladesh. Major General Ziaur Rahman, chief of Bangladesh Army, had difficulty moving the Bengal Lancers to Bogra but was forced after Air Vice Marshall Muhammad Ghulam Tawab, Chief of Bangladesh Air Force, threatened to use Air Force aircraft against the Bengal Lancers.

== Prelude ==
Tawab, a rightwing figure in the pro-Islamic faction of the armed forces, was secretly behind a large March 1976 religious gathering that demanded Islamic provisions in the constitution. He and the other coup plotters wanted Bangladesh to become an Islamic republic and sought a share of political power. The next month Tawab supports the return of four army officers involved in the assassination of Sheikh Mujibur Rahman and join the Bengal Lancers in Bogra Cantonment.

Lt. Col. (rtd) Khandaker Abdur Rashid flew from Bangkok to Dhaka on 20 April 1976. Rashid spent the next few days discreetly activating members of his old outfit (2nd Field Artillery), and of Lt. Col. (rtd) Syed Faruque Rahman's former armoured command, which had been split into the Bengal Lancers at Bogra and the 1st Bengal Cavalry at Savar. Faruque arrived in Dhaka by air from Singapore on 23 April. He was warmly welcomed by his tank crews at Savar.

== Operation ==
The led to the 1976 Bogra mutiny under Colonel Syed Faruque Rahman, one of officers Tawab helped returned. The government of Bangladesh responded firmly to the mutiny threatening to completely annihilate the unit. Syed Faruque Rahman surrendered on the condition that he will not be tried and be allowed to leave Bangladesh.

After the failed mutiny, Major General Ziaur Rahman retires Tawab, sends the four officers back, and disbands the Bengal Lancers. The 22nd Bengal Regiment mutinied in the 1977 Bogra mutiny to call for the release of Syed Faruque Rahman.
