= The Lives of a Bengal Lancer =

The Lives of a Bengal Lancer may refer to:

- The Lives of a Bengal Lancer (book), a 1930 autobiography of British cavalry officer Francis Yeats-Brown
- The Lives of a Bengal Lancer (film), a 1935 American adventure-comedy film loosely adapted from the 1930 book
