= Freedom Party (Bangladesh) =

Bangladeshi political party

Freedom Party, Bangladesh ফ্রীডম পার্টি, বাংলাদেশ
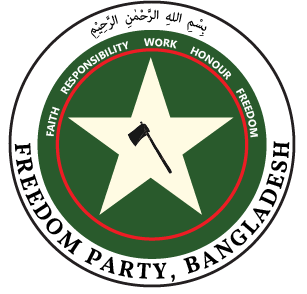
- Abbreviation: FP; Freedom Party
- Chairperson: Sayed Tariq Rahman
- General Secretary: Khawaja Nazimuddin
- Governing body: Central Executive Committee (CEC)
- Vice-chairperson: Dewan Hossain Mohammad Ismail
- Founder: Sayed Farooq-ur-Rahman
- Founded: 30 May 1981 (45 years ago)
- Newspaper: The Daily Millat
- Ideology: Desecularization
- Political position: Right-wing to Far-right
- Colours: Dark Green; Red; White
- Slogan: Freedom, Faith, Responsibility, Work and Honor ঈমান, দায়িত্ব, শ্রম, সম্মান এবং মুক্তি

Election symbol
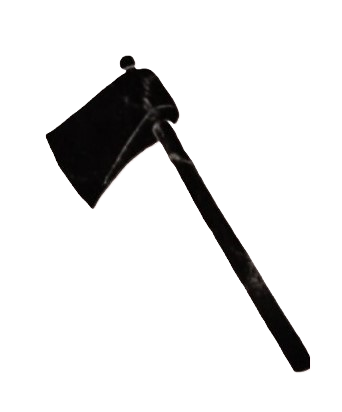
- Axe

Party flag
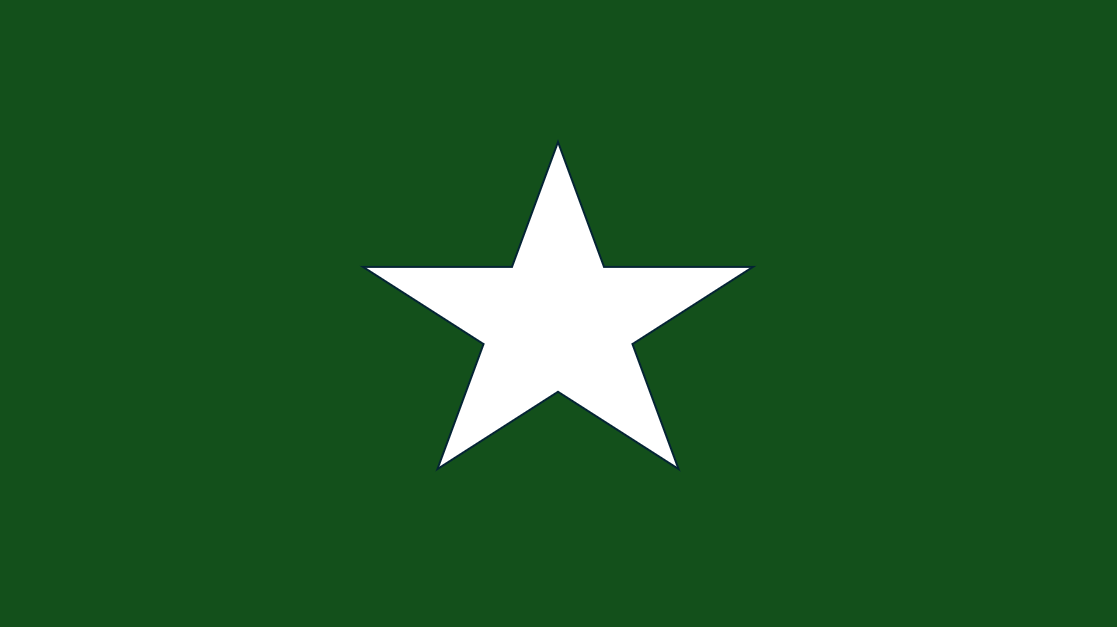

The Freedom Party, Bangladesh, also known as the Freedom Party, is one of the earliest Conservative political parties in Bangladesh which was founded by Sayed Farooq-ur-Rahman, Khandakar Abdur Rashid and Bazlul Huda who were the chief organisers of the assassination of Sheikh Mujibur Rahman on 15 August 1975.

== History ==
=== The 1975 coup d'état ===
After the liberation war against Pakistan and the declaration of Bangladesh as a sovereign and independent state, Sheikh Mujibur Rahman was sworn in as the Prime Minister of the newly independent country, later premiered Bangladesh as the President in 1975 for a few months till his assassination by disgruntled army officers led by Sayed Farooq-ur-Rahman, Khandakar Abdur Rashid, Bazlul Huda, Shariful Haque Dalim, Abdul Majed and others with the backing of to-be president Khandakar Mushtaq Ahmed. The situation of Bangladesh had deteriorated greatly both politically and economically to a point of desperation, along with occurrence of the famine of 1974. The dismay of army majors with the ruling Awami League government was sparked when Sheikh Mujibur Rahman had switched the governance system of Bangladesh to replicate the American government led by an executive president, he had proclaimed himself as president in a bid for more power. Along with this, Mujib had proclaimed using the desperate situation of the state, a state of emergency on 28 December 1974, suspending law courts of their power to intervene in his actions with his ideal of a national government. Sheikh Mujib had then passed through the Assembly a series of amendments to the Constitution which, reduced the National Parliament to an advisory status, hence legitimizing his own absolute grip on absolute power. One of these amendments put forth to the constitution of Bangladesh in January 1974 was the following:

- (a) In case he is a member of Parliament on the date the National Party is formed, cease to be such member, and his seat in Parliament shall become vacant if he does not become a member of the National Party within the time fixed by the President
- (b) Not be qualified for election as President or as a member of Parliament if he is not nominated as a candidate for such election by the National Party.
- (c) Have no right of form, or to be a member or otherwise take part in the activities of any political party other than the National Party.

Critics have said that Sheikh Mujibur Rahman had ultimately created an authoritarian and autocratic regime where his party, the Bangladesh Awami League and a few allies comprising the Bangladesh Krishak Sramik Awami League had absolute power, a one-party rule. Sheikh Mujibur Rahman had also passed the Special Powers Act, 1974 that provided the law enforcement agencies, especially the JRB an absolute power to detain and torture any citizen without any charge or trial for an indefinite time. Sayed Farooq-ur-Rahman and other army officers were highly resentful about the state of the country which they had fought against Pakistan for. This anti-Mujib sentiment in Sayed Farooq-ur-Rahman had gone to its highest point when members of Awami League had committed the following crime as stated in Bangladesh: A Legacy of Blood by Anthony Mascarenhas:

One day during a combing operation in the Tongi area north of Dhaka, Major Nasser who was commanding another squadron of the Bengal Lancers, arrested three small-time thugs. In the course of interrogation one of the men broke down and told the army officers a story about a particularly gruesome triple murder which had rocked Tongi the previous winter. It transpired that a newly married couple travelling to their home in a taxi had been waylaid on the outskirts of the town. The bridegroom and the taxi driver were hacked to death and their bodies thrown in the river. The bride, who was carried off to an isolated cottage, was repeatedly raped by her abductors. Three days later her mutilated body was found on the road near a bridge.

Confessing to his part in the crime, the thug told the army men the police investigation was called off when they found that the ring-leader of the gang was his boss, Muzamil, chairman of the Tongi Awami League. According to Farook the confession so infuriated the interrogating officer, a boyish lieutenant named Ishtiaq who has since resigned and left the country, that 'he started kicking the chap so hard that he died of internal injuries.'

Muzamil himself was taken by Major Nasser to Dhaka for prosecution after he had confirmed from police records that the thug had been telling the truth. According to Farook, Muzamil offered Nasser 300,000 Takkas for his release. 'Don't make it a public affair,' the Awami Leaguer advised him. 'You will anyway have to let me go, either today or tomorrow. So why not take the money and forget about it?' Nasser, who was affronted by this blatant attempt to bribe him, swore he would bring Muzamil to trial and make him hang for his crime. He handed him over to the civil authorities. Farook said they were all astonished a few days later to find that Muzamil had been released on Sheikh Mujib's direct intervention. 'I told you to take the money,' Muzamil crowed. 'You would have been the gainers. Now I have been released anyway and you get nothing.'

Farooq-ur-Rahman had desired to kill Sheikh Mujibur Rahman from the day of Sheikh Mujib's intervention, though he would later change his plan to execute an arrest of Mujib and to sack him of power.

Sayed Farooq-ur-Rahman said; "It seemed as if we were living in a society headed by a criminal organisation. It was as if the Mafia had taken over Bangladesh. We were totally disillusioned. Here was the head of government abetting murder and other extreme things from which he was supposed to protect us. This was not acceptable. We decided he must go."

Colonel Farooq had started discussing the ever-worsening state of Bangladesh, the brutality and corruption of the Awami League government led by Sheikh Mujibur Rahman with his fellow army officers, also talking with the Army Chief and future President of Bangladesh, Ziaur Rahman, as recounted in Bangladesh: A legacy of Blood by Anthony Mascarenhas:

It was a Thursday and when he reported to General Zia's bungalow at 7.30 pm he found Col. Moin, the Adjutant General, about to leave.

Farook said he broached the subject of his mission very cautiously. 'I was meeting the Deputy Chief of Army Staff and a Major General. If I bluntly told him that I wanted to overthrow the President of the country straightaway like that there was a very good chance that he would have arrested me with his own guards, there and then, and put me in jail. I had to go about it in a round-about way'.

Farook continued: 'Actually we came around to it by discussing the corruption and everything that was going wrong. I said the country required a change. Zia said "Yes, Yes. Let's go outside and talk" and then he took me on the lawn.'

'As we walked on the lawn I told him that we were professional soldiers who served the country and not an individual. The army and the civil government, everybody, was going down the drain. We have to have a change. We, the junior officers, have already worked it out. We want your support and your leadership'.

According to Farook, General Zia's answer was: 'I am sorry I would not like to get involved in anything like this. If you want to do something you junior officers should do it yourself. Leave me out of it'.

Yet in a later meeting, Army Chief Ziaur Rahman had urged then Major Farook to do something about the situation, then in collaboration with Khandakar Mushtaq Ahmed, and other army officers like his brother-in-law Khandakar Abdur Rashid, Shariful Haque Dalim and others to bring down the regime of Sheikh Mujibur Rahman. It is also said that Khandakar Abdur Rashid's wife Zubaida Khan, sister of Farooq-ur-Rahman's wife Farida Khan was a mastermind behind the military coup against Mujib. Colonel Farooq also sought the guidance of a Muhajir Sufi Peer from Bihar who has settled down in Chittagong as stated in Bangladesh: A Legacy of Blood by Anthony Mascarenhas:

Farook decided to seek celestial sanction for his terrible purpose. He sought out in the crowded Hali Shaar quarter of Chittagong a Bihari holy man who would have a powerful influence on the killing of Sheikh Mujibur Rahman.

Andha Hafiz (blind holy man) as he is known, was born without sight. His piety and austere life, however, had brought him the blessing of a phenomenal extrasensory perception and the gift of prophesy. The accuracy of his predictions had won him a sizeable following, among them the Khans of Chittagong who were Major Farook's in-laws. Farook decided to consult him — and found an early opportunity to do so. The Bengal Lancers were scheduled to go to Hat Hazari near Chittagong for range firing between 7th and 11th April. When this exercise was put back by two days, Farook took time off for a quick trip to Chittagong on 2nd April to see Andha Hafiz.

The 1975 coup d'état took place amid opposition to Sheikh Mujibur Rahman among sections of the population and the military, with some members of the armed forces expressing dissatisfaction with the government's policies and administration.

=== 1986 presidential election ===
After the assassination of Ziaur Rahman in 1981, Rahman returned to active politics by founding the Bangladesh Freedom Party and running for the presidency against Lt. Gen. Hussain Muhammad Ershad in 1986. Sayed Farooq-ur-Rahman representing the Bangladesh Freedom Party had run for presidency against Hussain Muhammad Ershad of the Jatiya Party, and Muhammadullah Hafezzi of the Bangladesh Khilafat Andolan. Sayed Farooq Rahman had obtained 1,202,303 of the total 21,795,337 votes, 4.64% of the total, coming third out of the twelve other presidential candidates. The Oxford-trained lawyer, Kamal Hossain, who was Mujib's law minister, and later foreign minister, told Salil Tripathi, a journalist, "The impunity with which Farooq operated was extraordinary. When he returned to Bangladesh, the government facilitated him and President Hussain Muhammad Ershad, who wanted some candidate to stand against him in the rigged elections. Ershad let Farooq stand to give himself credibility."

=== 1989 assassination plot ===
On 10 August 1989, activists and leaders of Freedom Party allegedly launched an attack at Sheikh Hasina's the then residence in Dhanmondi's Road 32. Around 14 members of the Bangladesh Freedom Party led by a certain Kajol and Kobir attacked Sheikh Hasina's residence by hurling a bomb and firing gunshots, as stated in the case referred to court. They chanted the slogan "Farooq-Rashid Zindabad" as they left the place. Following the incident, Zahurul Islam, a security guard of the residence, filed two cases with Dhanmondi Police Station, one for plotting to kill Hasina and other for hurling and possessing a bomb.

In 1997, eight years after the attack, Bangladesh's Criminal Investigation Department's (CID) pressed charges against 19 people, including leaders of the Bangladesh Freedom Party and the assassins of Sheikh Mujibur Rahman Lt Col (retd) Sayed Farooq-ur-Rahman, Lt Col (retd) Khandakar Abdur Rashid and Maj (retd) Bazlul Huda in an attempted murder and another explosive case. On 5 July 2009, charges were framed against 16 accused. Four of the accused, Sohel, Golam Sarwar Mamun, Joy Miah and Syed Nazmul Maksud Murad are all currently in jail. Four others of the accused, Humayun Kabir, Mizanur Rahman, Khandakar Amirul Islam and Md Shahjahan had been freed on bail. Two others, Zafar Ahmed and H Kabir are absconding while two others of the accused, Gazi Liakat Hossain and Rezaul Islam Khan died earlier. Sayed Farooq-ur-Rahman and Bazlul Huda have been executed in the Bangabandhu murder case.

=== Recent activity and leadership ===
On 11 February 1990, prominent members of the Bangladesh Freedom Party, Major. Zainul Abedin and Major. Bazlul Huda leading a group of 23 men attacked with shooting from firearms, a Bangladesh Awami League rally killing local Mymensingh Awami League activist Harun-ur-Rashid and injuring others. The Dhaka court sentenced Zaynul Abedin and 21 more to seven years' rigorous imprisonment for possessing illegal firearms, murder and assault. The party, according to 1997 UNHRC report, kept a low profile.

According to the Bangladesh Police, from 2000 onward, Mehnaz Rashid, daughter of Khandaker Abdur Rashid, had been involved in reorganizing Freedom Party. She contested the parliamentary polls in 2001 and 2008 from Chandina of Comilla representing Freedom Party. In 2009, Mehnaz Rashid was arrested by police, along with Kamrul Haque Swapan, younger brother of Major Sharful Haq Dalim for suspected links to a bomb attack on Awami League lawmaker Sheikh Fazle Noor Taposh.

== See also ==
- Category:Conservative parties in Bangladesh
