= Everyman (magazine) =

English magazine (1912 to 1916 & 1929 to 1935)

Everyman Magazine, Vol. 1, January 1929

Everyman was an English magazine from 1912 to 1916 and 1929 to 1935 edited first by Charles Sarolea and later by C. B. Purdom.

== History and profile ==
Everyman was founded by publisher J. M. Dent in 1912. The original editor was Charles Sarolea. After publication temporarily stopped during World War I, the magazine was relaunched in 1929 by Hugh Dent. The first issue of the new release came out 31 January 1929 under the management and editorship of C. B. Purdom.

Francis Yeats-Brown was briefly the editor in 1933; he was forced to resign after only seven weeks when his advocacy of Fascism was not supported by the magazine's directors.

The magazine covered books, drama, music and travel and featured articles by renowned authors such as Ivor Brown, Arthur Machen, G. K. Chesterton, A. E. Coppard, Bertrand Russell and many others.
