= Bengal Lancers =

Bengal Lancers may refer to numerous regiments of the British Indian Army, many continuing in the Indian Army and the Bangladesh Army.

== Individual units ==
- 1st Bengal Lancers
- 1st Bengal Lancers (Bangladesh)
- 2nd Bengal Lancers
- 4th Bengal Lancers
- 6th Bengal Lancers
- 7th Lancers
- 8th Lancers
- 10th Bengal Lancers
- 11th Bengal Lancers
- 13th Bengal Lancers
- 14th Bengal Lancers
- 17th Bengal Lancers
- 19th Bengal Lancers
- 41st Bengal Lancers

== See also ==
- The Lives of a Bengal Lancer (book)
- The Lives of a Bengal Lancer (film)
- Tales of the 77th Bengal Lancers (television series)
- Bengal Lancers in the St. Louis Veiled Prophet Parade and Ball
