= Francis Yeats-Brown =

Officer in the British Indian army (1886–1944)

Francis Yeats-Brown DFC
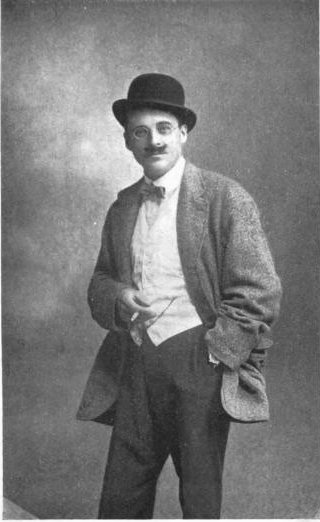
- Yeats-Brown as a "Hungarian Mechanic" in 1919
- Born: Francis Charles Claydon Yeats-Brown; 15 August 1886; Genoa, Kingdom of Italy
- Died: 19 December 1944 (aged 58); Kensington, London, England
- Education: Harrow School; Royal Military College, Sandhurst
- Military career
- Allegiance: United Kingdom; British Fascism
- Branch: British Army; Royal Air Force
- Rank: Lieutenant colonel
- Units: King's Royal Rifle Corps; Royal Flying Corps; Royal Air Force
- Awards: DFC

Lieutenant Colonel Francis Charles Claydon Yeats-Brown, DFC (15 August 1886 – 19 December 1944) was an officer in the British Indian army and the author of the memoir The Lives of a Bengal Lancer, for which he was awarded the 1930 James Tait Black Memorial Prize.

His admiration and advocacy of Italian fascism cost him his role as editor of the Everyman paper in 1933.

== Life and career ==
Yeats-Brown was born in Genoa in 1886, the son of the British consul Montague Yeats-Brown. He studied at Harrow and the Royal Military College, Sandhurst. When he was twenty he went to British India, where he was attached to the King's Royal Rifle Corps at Bareilly in present-day Uttar Pradesh. He was then transferred to the cavalry and sent to the perennially turbulent North West Frontier Province. His time there engendered in him a sympathy for the Muslim point of view, and in later years he would support the creation of an independent Pakistan.

During the First World War, Yeats-Brown saw action in France and in Mesopotamia, where he was a member of the Royal Flying Corps. His acts of bravery gained him the DFC. In 1915, his plane, piloted by Thomas White, was damaged on landing on a sabotage mission outside Baghdad, and he spent the following two years as a prisoner of war. That provided the material for his first book, Caught by the Turks (1919).

Following a temporary commission in the Royal Air Force, he returned to the Indian Army in August 1919. He retired from the army in 1924, and joined the staff of the Spectator magazine as assistant editor. During his time at The Spectator, Yeats-Brown expressed much admiration for Fascist Italy, which he saw as achieving a fair and just society while also crushing the Italian Communist Party. He quit the post in 1928.

The Lives of a Bengal Lancer, Yeats-Brown's most famous book, was published in 1930. The book is a memoir of his time in India from 1905 to 1914, with an emphasis on cantonment life at and around Bareilly. An immediate hit with readers and critics, the book won the James Tait Black Award that year and was turned into a successful 1935 film of the same name, starring Gary Cooper. In 1936, he published Lancer at Large, in which he showed an affinity for the principles of yoga.

During the 1930s, Yeats-Brown also became involved in right-wing politics. In 1933, Yeats-Brown was appointed editor of the Everyman. However his enthusiastic advocacy of the cause of Fascism was "to the surprise of the Directors", and he was forced to resign within weeks. His pro-war book, Dogs of War, sold poorly. On 10 November 1933, he wrote in Everyman: "The hope of order in Europe depends on the abolition of democracy and the establishment of Corporate States. It is a practical way of adjusting the interests of capital and labour so that both may benefit".

He was a member of the January Club and the Right Club, and wrote newspaper articles in praise of Francisco Franco and Hitler, asserting that Hitler had solved Germany's unemployment problem. He also wrote articles for New Pioneer, a far-right journal controlled by Viscount Lymington and closely linked to the British People's Party. In 1937, Hitler told Yeats-Brown in person in Nuremberg that the film The Lives of a Bengal Lancer was one of his favourites and had made it compulsory for all SS members. Yeats-Brown had expressed a rather confused anti-Semitism based on a militant anti-Zionism as he was very interested in the Palestine Question. In 1939, he wrote in The New Pioneer: "I would not allow any more Jews to enter England, but I would like every Jew born in this country to be proud of his British citizenship. [...] The Jews have great possibilities when standing on their own feet. We do not want them standing on ours". He wanted all British Jews to declare on their passports whatever they were Zionists or not. In a letter, he wrote: "It is horrible and haunts my conscience whenever I praise the other achievements of the National Socialists, some of which are great and good ... The way the Germans have treated their Jews is disgusting". Following the Nazi German invasion of Czechoslovakia in March 1939, he began to advocate for a strong response to German aggression and for British war readiness without relinquishing his fascist sympathies; in July 1939, he wrote, 'we must not be involved in a war to make the world safe for Stalin or international Jewry'.

When the Second World War broke out in 1939, Yeats-Brown took up a commission again and worked as a military correspondent. Throughout the Phoney War period, he continued to meet with fellow far-right conspirators, and lent his support to Henry Drummond Wolff's Union and Reconstruction movement. Between 1941 and 1942, he ran a short-lived organic farming project. He took the contradictory position of supporting the war effort while continuing to express admiration for Nazi Germany. In a letter to Henry Williamson on 24 November 1942 he wrote: "Am I an optimist to believe that what was good in Nazism will survive and that the Jews will not rule the world, and that this country will be regenerated?" In mid-1943 he hoped to become involved in the Allied invasion of Italy together with his pro-Fascist friends Harold Elsdale Goad and Muriel Currey. In 1943 and '44, promoted to lieutenant colonel, he toured the camps of India and the battlefields of Burma for his cousin Evelyn Wrench's public relations department in the Government of India, gathering material for a book entitled Martial India. He died in England in December 1944.

== Selected works ==
- Caught by the Turks (1919).
- The Lives of a Bengal Lancer (1930)
- Golden Horn (1932)
- Dogs of War (1934)
- Lancer at Large (1936)
- Yoga Explained (1937)
- European Jungle (1939)
- Indian Pageant (1942)
- Martial India (1945)

== Honours and awards ==
- 10 October 1919 – Flying Officer Francis Charles Claydon Yeats-Brown of the Royal Air Force is awarded the Distinguished Flying Cross in recognition of distinguished services rendered during the war.

== Sources ==
- Griffiths, Richard (1980), Fellow Travellers of the Right: British Enthusiasts for Nazi Germany, 1933-9, Oxford: Oxford University Press
- Griffiths, Richard (2017), What Did You Do During the War? The Last Throes of the British Pro-Nazi Right, 1940–45, London: Routledge, ISBN 9781138888968
