= Tales of the 77th Bengal Lancers =

- Genre: Adventure
- Written by: Jennings Cobb; John O'Dea; Douglas Heyes
- Directed by: Lew Landers
- Starring: Philip Carey; Warren Stevens; Patrick Whyte
- Country of origin: United States
- Original language: English
- No. of seasons: 1
- No. of episodes: 26

Production
- Producer: Herbert B. Leonard
- Production locations: Corriganville, Ray Corrigan Ranch, Simi Valley, California, United States
- Running time: 30 minutes
- Production company: Lancer Productions Limited

Original release
- Network: NBC
- Release: 21 October 1956 – 14 April 1957

Tales of the 77th Bengal Lancers is a television series broadcast in the United States by NBC during its 1956-57 season.

In a period in which much of the programming on U.S. television consisted of Westerns, Tales of the 77th Bengal Lancers could best be described as an "Eastern". It consisted of the adventures of a fictional regiment of the famed real-life cavalry of the British Indian Army. The leading characters were the 77th's officers: the commander, Colonel Standish (Patrick Whyte) and two of his lieutenants, William Storm (Warren Stevens) and Michael Rhodes (Phil Carey). Rhodes was portrayed as a Canadian, purportedly because the actor portraying him, a native of New Jersey, could not be coached to produce a credible English accent.

George Archainbaud earned a nomination from the Directors Guild of America as well from the Emmys in 1957 for his direction of the episode "The Traitor," which first aired Nov. 19, 1956.

The series failed in the ratings opposite Lassie on CBS and ended its run after six months on the air.

It was sponsored by General Foods.

Tales of the 77th Bengal Lancers was produced by Screen Gems. Bert Leonard created the series and was its producer.

== See also ==
- Lives of a Bengal Lancer
