= Operation Dal-Bhaat =

Operation launched by the Bangladesh Rifles (BDR)

Operation Dal-Bhat was an operation carried out by Bangladesh Rifles to provide grocery items (Dal Bhaat) to low income groups in Bangladesh. The operation was carried out during the Caretaker Government of Fakhruddin Ahmed. It was one of the illustrated reasons behind the Bangladesh Rifles Mutiny of 2009. Colonel Mujibul Haque who was killed in the mutiny was in charge of the operation. The mutineers demanded their share of the profits from the operation.

== Background ==
At the end of Bangladesh Nationalist Party's 2001–2006 term, the Awami League questioned the neutrality of K. M. Hasan, the immediate past Chief Justice, who was in line to become Chief Advisor of the caretaker government. With uncertainty about who would be appointed as CA, Awami League supporters led protests and violence beginning on 28 October, popularly known as the logi boitha movement, which resulted in at least 12 deaths and thousands of injuries. On that day, Awami League activists allegedly beat and killed members of an opposing party.

Military representatives met with President Ahmed on 11 January, urging him to declare a state of emergency, and to resign and appoint an Interim Chief Advisor. According to a United States diplomatic cable later released under Wikileaks, the Army Chief, General Moeen U Ahmed, and his group persuaded the President to declare a state of emergency on 11 January 2007. At the time, the Directorate General of Forces Intelligence & Counterterrorism, Brigadier General A T M Amin, met with the US Ambassador, Patricia Butenis, to explain the military's concerns. Given the Awami League's withdrawal from the elections, they believed that supporting a one-sided election might threaten the armed forces continued participation in UN peacekeeping missions – UNPKO, which they valued. In addition, they were worried about threatened terrorist violence from Jamaat-ul-Mujahideen Bangladesh (JMB), which had set off 300 bombs in August 2005. They wanted a neutral government established until "fair, free and credible elections" could be held in which all parties participated.

The BBC reported on 11 January 2007 that, given the withdrawal of the Awami League, and announced resignations, the United Nations and the European Union immediately suspended their election monitoring operations, as conditions for a credible vote did not exist. On the same day as the UN and EU withdrawal, Chief Advisor Iajuddin Ahmed announced a state of emergency in Bangladesh. He established a late night to early morning (11 p.m. to 5 am) curfew. The Economist reported this action as a form of coup d'état. On 12 January 2007, with military backing, the former Bangladesh Bank governor Fakhruddin Ahmed, who had worked for the World Bank, was sworn in as the new Chief Advisor. He appointed five advisors on 13 January to form the new interim government. When he was officially named as the head of the caretaker government, he lifted the curfew. The state of emergency was continued, suspending some basic rights provided by the constitution, such as the freedom of movement, assembly, and speech to limit protests and disruptive political activity.

In 2007, the caretaker government pursued graft and corruption charges against both major party leaders and some of their senior staff. It filed charges against 160 politicians, civil servants, and businessmen, including Tareque and Arafat Rahman, two sons of the former prime minister, Khaleda Zia, who were both active in the BNP. Later in the year, the government filed charges of corruption against both her and Sheikh Hasina, leader of the Awami League. This anti-corruption effort was greeted with approval by the people, who were tired of government officials "siphoning off the country's wealth." On 12 July 2007, Sheikh Hasina, party leader of the Awami League, was arrested for graft, based on charges filed by a businessman against her for actions in 1998.

== Operation ==
The Military backed caretaker government launched Operation Dal-Bhat to sell commodities (rice, maize, and oil) to low income families during a time of high inflation. The operation started in March 2007 with 17 temporary markets followed by a further 25 markets manned by soldiers of Bangladesh Rifles. Colonel Mohammad Mojibul Haque, commander of Bangladesh Rifles' Dhaka Sector, led the operation. The Bangladesh Rifles, a paramilitary unit responsible for guarding the borders of Bangladesh and commanded by Bangladesh Army officers, were employed to carryout the task. In August 2007, The Daily Star wrote about the need to expand stores under Operation Dal-Bhat.

By late 2008, many of the personnel of Bangladesh Rifles personnel felt that their officers had deprived them of their shares of their profit from Operation Dal-Bhat. During the operation, commodities were sold to a hundred thousand people per day in Dhaka. Rice, maize, and edible oil worth four billion BDT were sold during the course of the operation. The shops had sold 130 thousand tones of rice, two thousand tones of maize, and three thousand five hundred ton of edible oil. The operation was ended on 28 September 2008. Many of the soldiers had not received their allowance for the operation. Colonel Mohammad Mojibul Haque claimed they did not make a profit from the sales.

== Aftermath ==
Soldiers of Bangladesh Rifles resented that their commanding officers came from Bangladesh Army and that resentment was further fueled by grievances from Operation Dal-Bhat. This led to the Bangladesh Rifles to mutiny on 25 February in which 74 people were killed including 57 officers of Bangladesh Army. Major General Shakil Ahmed, Director General of Bangladesh Rifles, was praising the soldiers of for their role in Operation Dal-Bhat at the beginning of the darbar on the day of the mutiny which enraged the soldiers. Bangladesh Rifles was renamed to Border Guards Bangladesh. Colonel Mujibul Haque, commander of Dhaka Sector of Bangladesh Rifles, who was killed in the mutiny was in charge of the Operation Dal-Bhat.

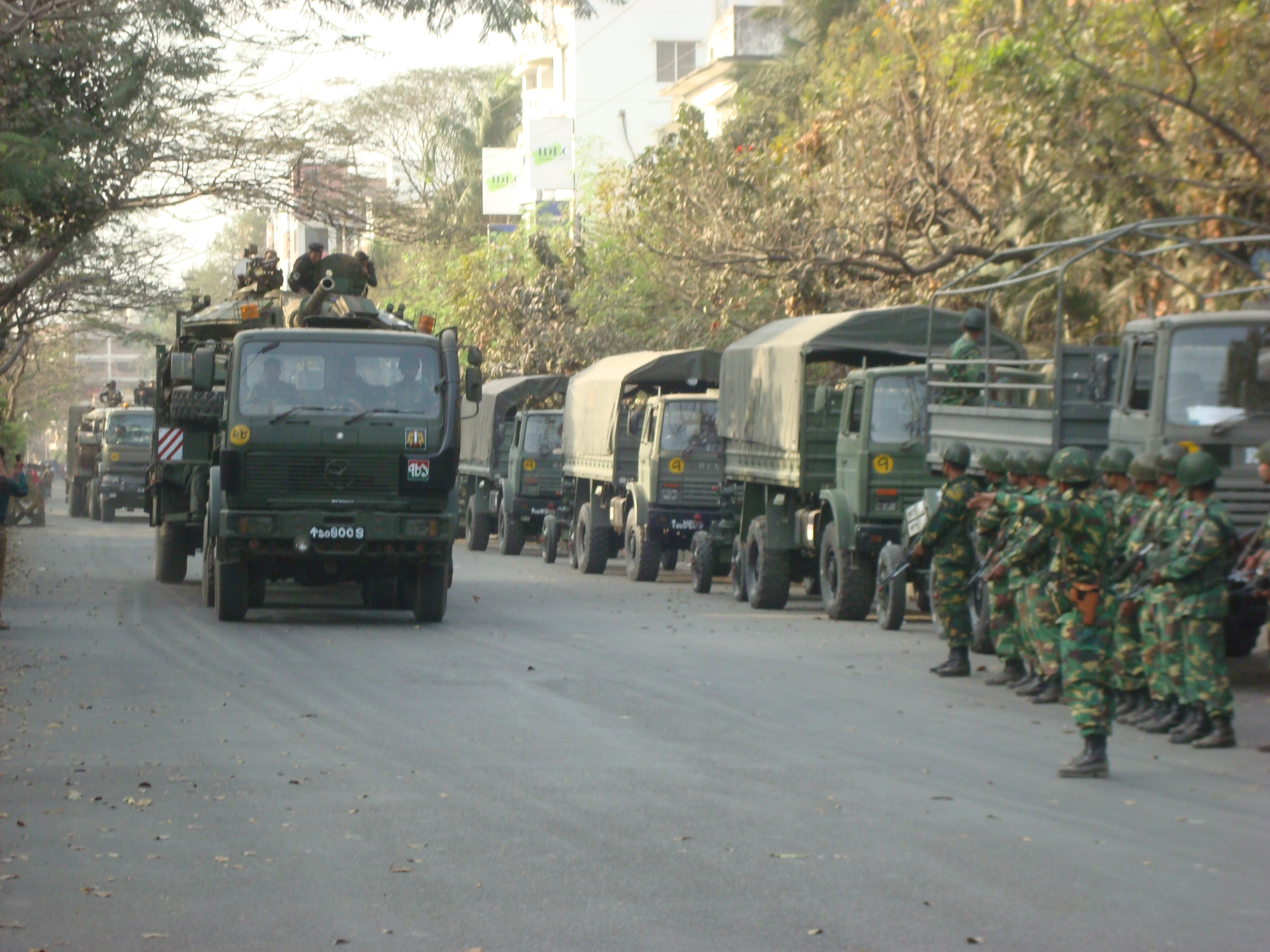
Army convoy gathering behind the tanks near Abahani ground on 26 February 2009

Major General Aziz Ahmed, Director General of Border Guards Bangladesh, spoke to The Daily Star against using uniformed personnel in commercial operations in the future. Major General Md Mainul Islam, another Director General of Border Guards Bangladesh, also criticized the deployment of Bangladesh Rifles soldiers in Operation Dal-Bhat.

Third Additional Metropolitan Sessions' Judge Md Akhtaruzzaman observed in the 2013 verdict on the Bangladesh Rifles mutiny that the Operation Dal-Bhat had negatively impacted the moral of Bangladesh Rifles personnel. He also observed the operation was not successful due to the limitations of the paramilitary.

In November 2017, Justice Md Nazrul Islam Talukder of the Bangladesh High Court criticised the use of soldiers in Operation Dal-Bhat. He also said Border Guard Bangladesh should not engage in any operation similar to Operation Dal-Bhat. In November 2017, Talukder, Justice Md Shawkat Hossain, and Justice Md Abu Zafor Siddique gave the verdict in the Bangladesh Rifles mutiny case. In the verdict, he asked the government not to repeat such actions that might have a negative effect on moral and professionalism of the soldiers.
