= Khandaker Abdur Rashid =

Officer of the Bangladesh Army

- খন্দকার আব্দুর রশিদ
- Born: 21 July 1946 (age 80); Tipperah, Bengal Province, British India
- Relatives: Sayed Farooq-ur-Rahman (brother-in-law); Abul Kashem Khan (uncle-in-law); Khans of Chittagong (in-laws)
- Military career
- Allegiance: Pakistan (before 1971); Bangladesh
- Branch: Pakistan Army; Bangladesh Army
- Service years: 1967–1976
- Rank: Lieutenant Colonel
- Unit: Regiment of Artillery
- Commands: Deputy Commander of Z Force; Commander of 2nd Field Artillery Battery; CO of 2nd Field Artillery Regiment
- Known for: Involvement in the assassination of Sheikh Mujibur Rahman
- Conflicts: Bangladesh Liberation War; 15 August 1975 Bangladeshi coup d'état; 3 November 1975 Bangladeshi coup d'état; 1976 Bogra mutiny

Khandaker Abdur Rashid is a Bangladeshi fugitive and former officer of the Bangladesh Army, who was a key organizer of the 15 August 1975 coup d'état.

== Early life ==
Khandaker Abdur Rashid was born on 21 July 1946 in Comilla of then Bengal Province, British India.

== Military career ==
He served in the Pakistan Army and defected during the start of Bangladesh Liberation War. He was a freedom fighter and fought under Z force.

== Assassination of Sheikh Mujib ==
Rashid was a major at the time of the 15 August 1975 coup and the assassination of Sheikh Mujib. He was part of the team that raided the armory of the 2nd Field Artillery on 11:30 pm August 15 to use the weapons in the coup. He was maintaining contact with Moshtaque throughout the time. The conspirators held several meetings at his residence in Dhaka Cantonment. He was promoted to lieutenant colonel after the assassination.

Despite having a similarity in family name, the only relation between Abdur Rashid and Khandaker Moshtaque Ahmed was their common birth district. Khandaker Moshtaque Ahmed became the president of Bangladesh after the assassination of Sheikh Mujib.

== Political career ==
He returned to Dhaka during the regime of Hussain Mohammad Ershad. He formed the Bangladesh Freedom Party with Sayed Farooq-ur-Rahman. He was elected to parliament in the 15 February 1996 general election from Comilla-6, which was discredited. Farooq was his brother in law. He was convicted and sentenced to death in absentia for the assassination of Sheikh Mujib. He lives in the United States as of 2000. In 2016, the government of Bangladesh passed a law that allowed for the seizure of the properties of those convicted in the killing of Sheikh Mujib. Abdur Rashid's shares in Kushtia based Jubilee Bank were ordered to be seized by Bangladesh Bank.

== Family life ==
Khandakar Abdur-Rashid is married to Zubaida Khan, a daughter of S. H. Khan, the younger brother of Abul Kashem Khan, a leading industrialist and minister belonging to the politically prominent Khan family of Chittagong. His daughter Mehnaz Rashid is a leader of the Freedom Party and was arrested in 2009 by Bangladesh Police.
