= 1st Bengal Lancers (Bangladesh) =

- Active: 1974-1976
- Country: Bangladesh
- Branch: Bangladesh Army
- Type: Tank regiment
- Garrison/HQ: Dhaka Cantonment
- Equipment: 30 T-54 Tanks
- Engagements: 15 August 1975 Bangladeshi coup d'état; First Siege of Dhaka; 7 November 1975 Bangladeshi coup d'état

Commanders
- Notable commanders: Colonel Momen (officially); Sayed Farooq-ur-Rahman (de-facto)

The 1st Bengal Lancers was the Bangladesh Army's first tank regiment. It is famous for being the main force behind the 15 August 1975 coup, which resulted in the assassination of Sheikh Mujib and his family.

== Formation ==
After the Bangladesh Liberation War, the newly formed Bangladesh Army was short staffed and had only inherited a few obsolete Pakistani tanks. In 1973, Bangladesh had donated tea and medical supplies to the Egyptian Army as support and the Egyptian government wanted to thank them. After the 1973 Arab-Israeli war, Anwar Sadat decided to donate 30 Egyptian T-54 tanks to the Bangladesh government. This donation of tanks was used to raise the first proper tank regiment in Bangladesh.

== Assassination of Sheikh Mujib ==
After its formation, Colonel Momen was assigned as the CO, with Major Farooq being his second-in-command. However, as Farooq had more experience from serving in Pakistan's Armoured Corps, he was the de facto commander. Horrified by the corruption and incompetency that he saw during the famine of 1974, Farooq and his brother-in-law, Khandaker Abdul Rashid, came up with a plan to assassinate Sheikh Mujib. They combined the 1st Bengal Lancers with the 2nd Field Artillery unit and started planning a coup. With the political backing of Khandaker Mostaq Ahmed, they formed kill squads with a group of like-minded Majors and assassinated most of Sheikh Mujib's family. Tanks from the Lancers were used to neutralize the Jatiya Rakkhi Bahini. Afterwords, Major Dalim captured the army chief, KM Shafiullah, and forced him and the other service chiefs to swear allegiance to President Ahmed.

== November Coups and Split ==
On November 3, the CGS Brigadier Khaled Mosharraf launched a counter coup, which resulted in all of the assassins agreeing to leave the country. Then-Major General Mosharraf would later be assassinated during the Sepoy Mutiny, in support of Major General Ziaur Rahman. Afterwords, the 1st Bengal Lancers was split between Savar and Bogra.

== See also ==
- Assassination of Sheikh Mujibur Rahman
