= Mujibul Haque (officer) =

Bangladesh Army officer

- Born: 3 April 1957; Barisal, East Pakistan, Pakistan
- Died: 25 February 2009 (aged 51); Pilkhana, Dhaka, Bangladesh
- Military career
- Allegiance: Bangladesh
- Branch: Bangladesh Army; Bangladesh Rifles
- Service years: 1976-2009
- Rank: Colonel
- Unit: Corps of Engineers
- Commands: Sector Commander of BDR; Director(Administration) of Rapid Action Battalion; CO of 16th Engineers Construction Battalion; CO of 5th Engineers Regiment
- Conflicts: UNOMIG; 2007-2008 Bangladesh political crises Bangladesh Rifles revolt †
- Police career
- Unit: Rapid Action Battalion
- Allegiance: Bangladesh
- Branch: Bangladesh Police
- Service years: 2004–2005
- Rank: Director
- Awards: BPM (bsa)

Mojibul Hoque was a Bangladesh Army officer and commander of Operation Dal-Bhaat. He was killed in the Bangladesh Rifles mutiny in 2009.

== Career ==
Mujibul Hoque was a counsel at the Bangladesh Embassy in Thailand from 2003 to 2007. He was the United Nations Mission sector commander of the Gali Sector in Georgia. He was the commander of the Bangladesh Rifles Dhaka Sector. He was the commanding officer of Operation Dal-Bhaat, which was launched by the caretaker government during the 2007-2008 Bangladesh political crises. He planned to retire on 3 April 2009.

== Death ==
Mujibul Hoque was present at the Bangladesh Rifles Headquarters when the BDR Mutiny started on 25 February 2009. He was taken prisoner by mutinous soldiers. He was then killed on the third floor of a building by Lance Nayek Anwar, Havildar Yusuf, and Sepoy Bazlur Rashid. He was shot and then thrown out of the window.

== Personal life ==
Mujibul Hoque was married to Nehreen Ferdousi. Judge Md Akhtaruzzaman of the Dhaka metropolitan sessions court sentenced 152 mutineers to death, 158 to life imprisonment, and 251 were sentenced to various jail terms in 2013. The verdict was upheld by the Bangladesh High Court in 2017.

== See also ==
- Md Shawkat Imam- Sector Commander killed in the Mutiny
- Gulzar Uddin Ahmed-Sector Commander killed in the Mutiny
- Quadrat Elahi Rahman Shafique -Sector Commander and Nephew of Hussain Muhammad Ershad killed in the Mutiny
