= Muhammad Rashed Amin =

Bangladeshi former general (born 1965)

- Born: 18 October 1965 (age 60)
- Military career
- Allegiance: Bangladesh
- Branch: Bangladesh Army
- Service years: 1986–2021
- Rank: Major General
- Service number: BA - 3135
- Unit: Armoured Corps
- Commands: Senior Directing Staff (Army-1) of National Defence College; GOC of 7th Infantry Division; GOC of 33rd Infantry Division; Commander of 93rd Armoured Brigade; Commandant of Armoured Centre and School
- Conflicts: UNIKOM; UNOCI
- Awards: Oshamanno Sheba Padak(OSP)
- Other work: Senior Directing Staff (Adjunct-1) of National Defence College

Muhammad Rashed Amin, OSP, rcds, ndc, psc is a retired major general of the Bangladesh Army. He is serving as senior directing staff (adjunct-1) at the National Defense College. He served as the general officer commanding the 7th Infantry Division and 33rd Infantry Division.

== Career ==
Amin was commissioned on 25 December 1986 with the 15th BMA Long Course in the Armoured corps. His parent unit is the 4th Horse Regiment.

During his career, he served as a general staff officer grade-2 in Army Headquarters, Armoured Directorate. He commanded the Bengal Cavalry, the senior most armoured regiment. As lieutenant colonel and colonel, he served as general staff officer grade-1 in both Division Headquarters and Directorate of Armour in AHQ, Directorate General of Forces Intelligence, and as commander of two detachments. As brigadier general, he commanded the 93 Armoured Brigade and served as commandant of the Armoured Corps Centre and School. As major general, he commanded the 7 and 33 Infantry Divisions; and served as college secretary and senior directing staff of the National Defence College. Before joining the National Defence College, he attended the Royal College of Defence Studies in the United Kingdom. He served twice in United Nations missions, once in Kuwait (UNIKOM - 1994) and as a staff officer in United Nations Operations in Cote d'Ivoire (UNOCI - 2008). He also served twice as an instructor (both in tactics and technical) in the Armoured Corps Centre and School.

Amin completed various training from both home and abroad. He attended the Mid-Career Course in the School of Armour Nowshera, Pakistan; the Management and Governance of Defence in a Democracy (UK Course) in Sri Lanka; and the International Director Intelligence Course in the United Kingdom. He is a graduate of three prestigious institutions from home and abroad, i.e., Defence Services Command and Staff College, National Defense College in Bangladesh, and Royal College of Defence Studies in the United Kingdom.
