= The Lives of a Bengal Lancer (book) =

1930 autobiography of Francis Yeats-Brown

- The Lives of a Bengal Lancer
- Author: Francis Yeats-Brown
- Language: English
- Genre: Autobiography
- Publisher: The Viking Press
- Publication date: 1930
- Publication place: United Kingdom
- Pages: 304
- ISBN: 978-141-791-294-0

The Lives of a Bengal Lancer is a 1930 autobiography of British cavalry officer Francis Yeats-Brown published by The Viking Press. The autobiography's release was met with highly positive reviews and Yeats-Brown was awarded the James Tait Black Memorial Prize of 1930.

In 1935, the book was made into a Hollywood blockbuster by the same name starring Gary Cooper, Franchot Tone, Richard Cromwell. The film was nominated for seven Academy Awards including Best Director, Best Original Screenplay, and Best Picture. The film does not follow the plot of the book.

== Plot ==
In 1905, Francis Yeats-Brown, then a young cavalryman, arrives in Bengal to serve in the 17th Bengal Lancers on the Northwest Frontier of British India. He quickly discovers that life in the presence of his fellow soldiers is anything but boring. When not on active duty, he spends his time riding horses around the countryside, hunting boars, smoking tobacco and studying Indian mysticism. He sees active service in France in 1914 and becomes a military air observer in Mesopotamia in 1915. He eventually becomes a prisoner of war of the Ottoman Empire and makes unsuccessful attempts at escape. Yeats-Brown returns to India in 1919, continues to serve in the Cavalry and continues to study yoga.

== See also ==
- The Lives of a Bengal Lancer (film)
