= Salil Tripathi =

Indian author and editor

- Born: Mumbai, India
- Education: University of Bombay, Dartmouth College
- Occupations: Author, editor
- Notable work: Offence: The Hindu Case

Salil Tripathi is an Indian author and editor. He is Chair of PEN International's Writers in Prison Committee. He is a contributing editor to The Caravan. and Mint. He is a contributing advisor to the think tank, Bridge India since June 2019.

== Biography ==
Tripathi was born in Mumbai. He was educated at the New Era School in Mumbai and graduated from the Sydenham College of the University of Bombay. Tripathi obtained his MBA from the Amos Tuck School of Business Administration at Dartmouth College in the United States.

== Career ==
Tripathi's articles have appeared in Foreign Policy, The Wall Street Journal, The Far Eastern Economic Review, and The International Herald Tribune.

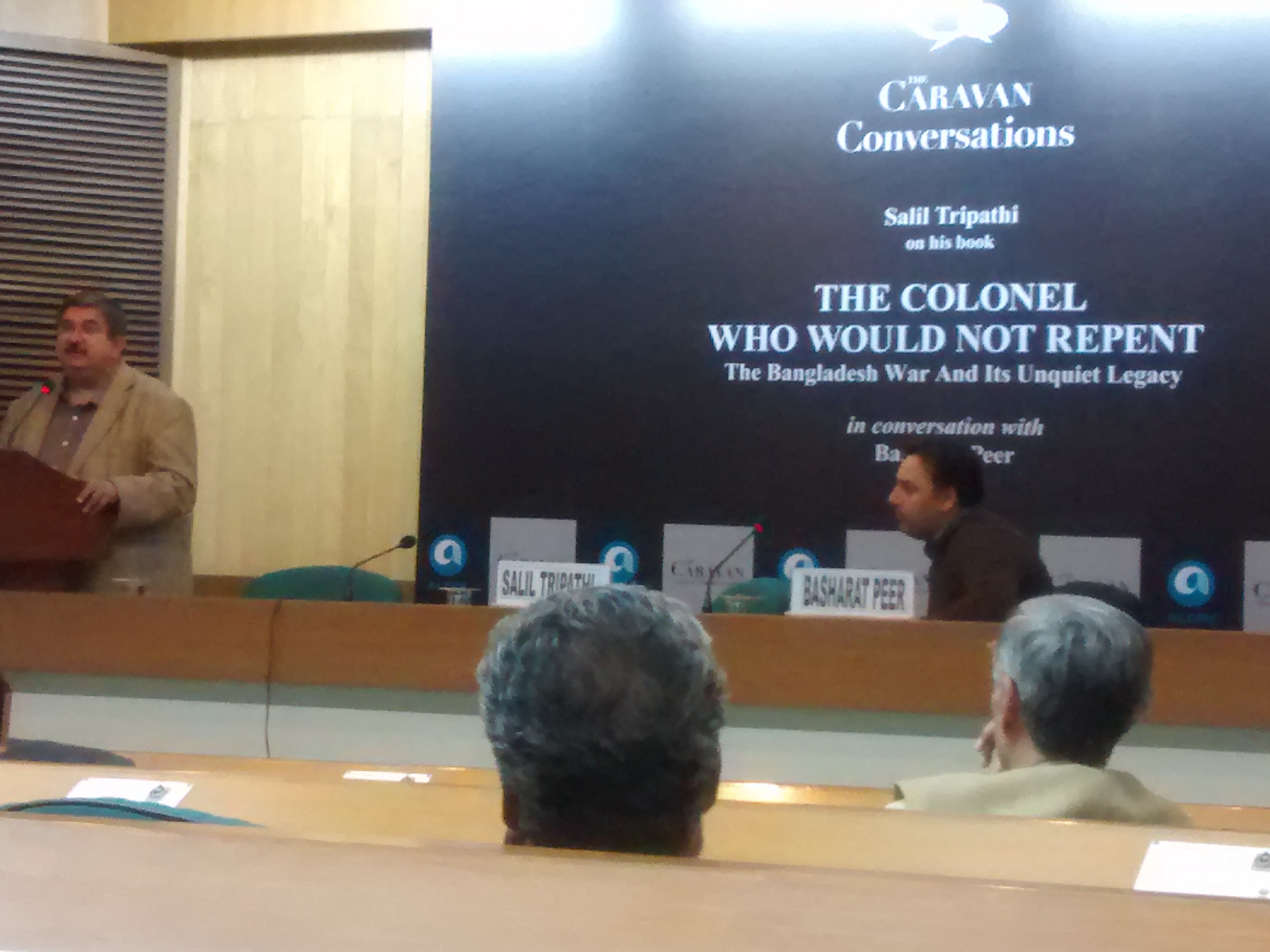
Tripathi speaking about his book

== Books ==
- Offence: The Hindu Case
- The Colonel Who Would Not Repent: The Bangladesh War and its Unquiet Legacy
- Detours: Songs of the Open Road
- The Gujaratis: A Portrait of a Community (2024)

== 2020 Twitter suspension ==
In December 2020, Tripathi's Twitter account was suspended. Salman Rushdie was among the writers who criticized Twitter for this decision. Shashi Tharoor, Amitav Ghosh, Suketu Mehta, Prashant Bhusan, Paranjoy Guha Thakurta, Aakar Patel, and Nilanjana Roy also criticized Twitter's decision.

PEN International also criticized Twitter's suspension of Tripathi's account and urged Twitter to have more transparent policies.

== Awards ==
Tripathi received the Bastiat Prize (third place) in 2011.
