= List of members of the 3rd Jatiya Sangsad =

3rd Jatiya Sangsad
←	2nd Sangsad	4th Sangsad	→
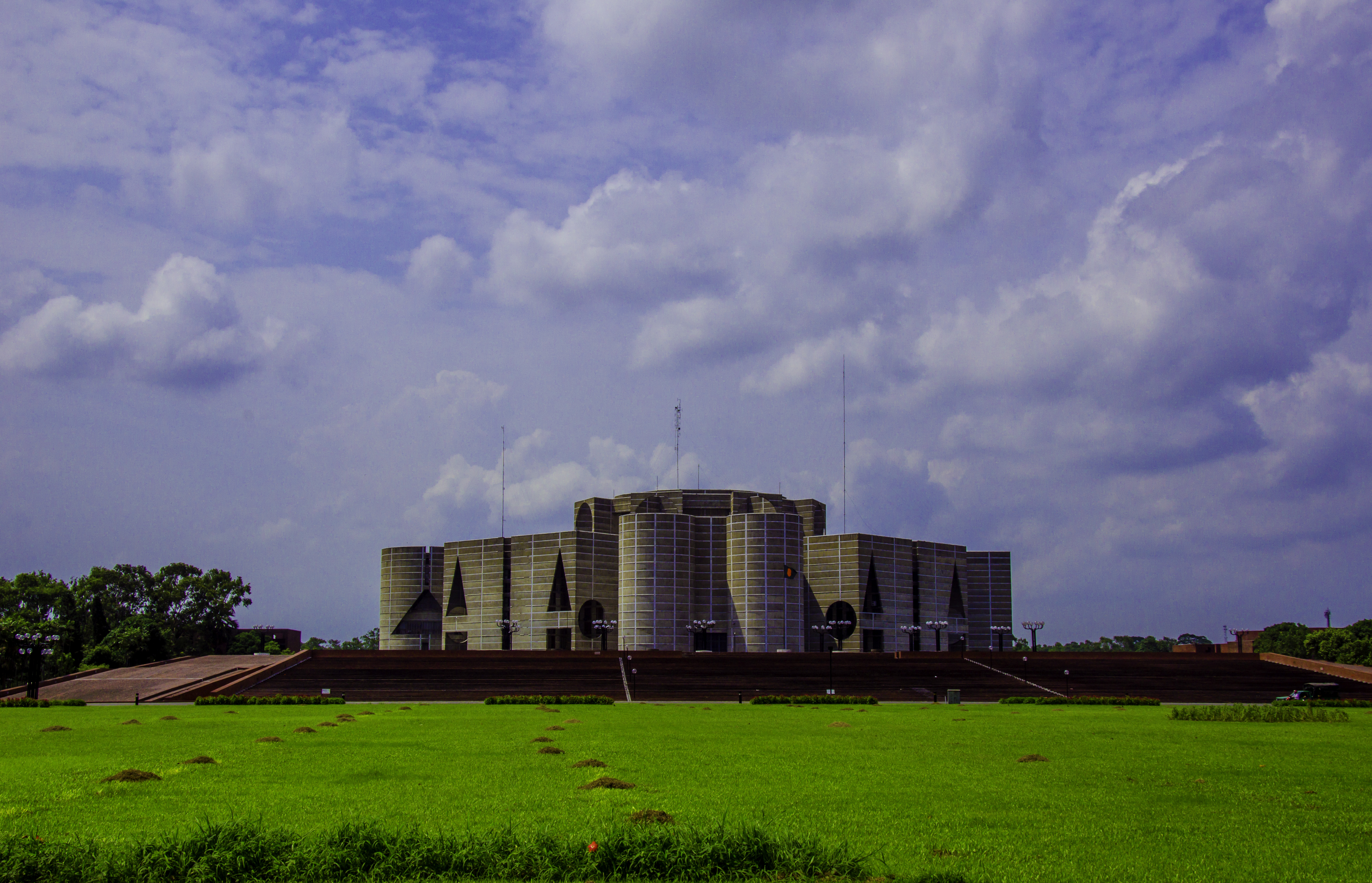

Overview
- Legislative body: Parliament of the Bangladesh
- Jurisdiction: Bangladesh
- Term: 7 May 1986 – 3 March 1988
- Election: 1986 Bangladeshi general election

Jatiya Sangsad
- Members: 300

This is a list of members of parliament (MPs) elected to the 3rd Parliament of the Jatiya Sangsad, the National Parliament of Bangladesh, by Bangladeshi constituencies. The list includes both MPs elected at the 1986 general election, held in 7 May 1986, and nominated women's members for reserved seats and those subsequently elected in by-elections.

== Members ==
=== Elected members of parliament ===
No	Constituency	Name	Party	Notes
1	Panchagarh-1	Sirajul Islam	Awami League	
2	Panchagarh-2	Mohammad Farhad	Communist Party of Bangladesh	
3	Thakurgaon-1	Rezwanul Haque Idu Chowdhury	Jatiya Party	
4	Thakurgaon-2	Dabirul Islam	Communist Party of Bangladesh	
5	Thakurgaon-3	Muhammad Shahidullah	Communist Party of Bangladesh	
6	Dinajpur-1	Abdul Malek Sarkar	Awami League	
7	Dinajpur-2	Satish Chandra Roy	Awami League	
8	Dinajpur-3	Amzad Hossain	Awami League	
9	Dinajpur-4	Mizanur Rahman Manu	Workers Party of Bangladesh	
10	Dinajpur-5	Mostafizur Rahman Fizar	Awami League	
11	Dinajpur-6	Zafar Muhammad Lutfar	NAP (Muzaffar)	
12	Nilphamari-1	Begum Mansur Mohiuddin	Jatiya Party	
13	Nilphamari-2	Dewan Nurunnabi	Jatiya Party	
14	Nilphamari-3	Joban Uddin Ahmad	Bangladesh Jamaat-e-Islami	
15	Nilphamari-4	Rowshan Ali Miah	Jatiya Party	
16	Lalmonirhat-1	Joynal Abedin Sarker	Jatiya Party	
17	Lalmonirhat-2	Mojibur Rahman	Jatiya Party	
18	Lalmonirhat-3	Abdul Hossain	Awami League	
19	Rangpur-1	Moyezuddin Sarker	Jatiya Party	
20	Rangpur-2	Anisul Haque Chowdhury	Awami League	
21	Rangpur-3	Shafiqul Ghani Swapan	Jatiya Party	
22	Rangpur-4	Shah Abdur Razzak	Awami League	
23	Rangpur-5	H. N. Ashequr Rahman	Awami League	
24	Rangpur-6	Abdul Jalil Pradhan	Jatiya Party	
25	Kurigram-1	A.K.M. Shahidul Islam	Jatiya Party	
26	Kurigram-2	Md. Tajul Islam Choudhury	Jatiya Party	
27	Kurigram-3	AKM Maidul Islam	Jatiya Party	
28	Kurigram-4	Najimuddaula	Independent	
29	Gaibandha-1	Hafizur Rahman Pramanik	Jatiya Party	
30	Gaibandha-2	Adur Rouf Mia	Jatiya Party	
31	Gaibandha-3	TIM Fazle Rabbi Chowdhury	Jatiya Party	
32	Gaibandha-4	Lutfar Rahman Chowdhury	Jatiya Party	
33	Gaibandha-5	Fazle Rabbi Miah	Jatiya Party	
34	Joypurhat-1	Abbas Ali Mandal	Awami League	
35	Joypurhat-2	Md. Abdur Razzak Akand	Awami League	
36	Bogra-1	Mohammad Abdul Momin Mandal	Jatiya Party	
37	Bogra-2	Mozaffar Hossain	Jatiya Party	
38	Bogra-3	ABM Shahjahan	JSD (S)	
39	Bogra-4	Mamdudur Rahman Chowdhury	Jatiya Party	
40	Bogra-5	Ferdous Zaman Mukul	Awami League	
41	Bogra-6	Abdur Rahman Fakir	Bangladesh Jamaat-e-Islami	
42	Bogra-7	Aminul Islam Sarker	Jatiya Party	
43	Nawabgonj-1	Moin Uddin Ahmed	Independent	
44	Nawabgonj-2	Mim Obaidullah	Bangladesh Jamaat-e-Islami	
45	Nawabgonj-3	Latifur Rahman	Bangladesh Jamaat-e-Islami	
46	Naogaon-1	Md. Azizur Rahman Miah	Awami League	
47	Naogaon-2	Humayun Kabir Chowdhury	Jatiya Party	
48	Naogaon-3	Mohammad Baitullah	Awami League	
49	Naogaon-4	Emaz Uddin Pramanik	Jatiya Party	
50	Naogaon-5	Abdul Jalil	Awami League	
51	Naogaon-6	Ohidur Rahman	Communist Party of Bangladesh	
52	Rajshahi-1	Mujibur Rahman	Bangladesh Jamaat-e-Islami	
53	Rajshahi-2	Mesbah Uddin Ahmed	Jatiya Party	
54	Rajshahi-3	Sardar Amjad Hossain	Bangladesh Krishak Sramik Awami League	
55	Rajshahi-4	Muhammad Ayyan Ud-Din	Bangladesh Muslim League	
56	Rajshahi-5	Mohammad Nurun Nabi Chand	Awami League	
57	Natore-1	Momtaz Uddin	Awami League	
58	Natore-2	Mohammad Mujibur Rahman	Jatiya Party	
59	Natore-3	Yakub Ali	Jatiya Party	
60	Natore-4	Md. Abul Kasem Sarker	Jatiya Party	
61	Sirajganj-1	Mohammed Nasim	Awami League	
62	Sirajganj-2	Iqbal Hassan Mahmood	Jatiya Party	
63	Sirajganj-3	Ishaque Hossain Talukder	Awami League	
64	Sirajganj-4	Abdul Latif Mirza	Awami League	
65	Sirajganj-5	Mofiz Uddin Talukder	Jatiya Party	
66	Sirajganj-6	Nurul Islam Talukder	Jatiya Party	
67	Sirajganj-7	M.A. Matin	Jatiya Party	
68	Pabna-1	Manzur Quader	Jatiya Party	
69	Pabna-2	Mokbul Hossain	Jatiya Party	
70	Pabna-3	Wazi Uddin Khan	Awami League	
71	Pabna-4	Panjab Ali Biswas	Jatiya Samajtantrik Dal-JSD	
72	Pabna-5	Rafiqul Islam Bakul	Awami League	
73	Meherpur-1	Mohammad Shahiduddin	Awami League	
74	Meherpur-2	Mohammad Nurul Haque	Awami League	
75	Kushtia-1	Mohammad Korban Ali	Jatiya Party	
76	Kushtia-2	Abdul Wahed	Bangladesh Jamaat-e-Islami	
77	Kushtia-3	Syed Altaf Hossain	NAP	
78	Kushtia-4	Abul Hossain Tarun	Awami League	
79	Chuadanga-1	Makbul Hossain	Jatiya Party	
80	Chuadanga-2	Mirza Sultan Raja	Jatiya Samajtantrik Dal (Siraj)	
81	Jhenidah-1	Md. Kamruzzaman	Awami League	
82	Jhenidah-2	Anwar Zahid	Jatiya Party	
83	Jhenidah-3	ASM Mozammel Haque	Bangladesh Jamaat-e-Islami	
84	Jhenidah-4	Abdus Sattar	Jatiya Party	
85	Jessore-1	Noor Hussain	Bangladesh Jamaat-e-Islami	
86	Jessore-2	Maqbool Hossain	Bangladesh Jamaat-e-Islami	
87	Jessore-3	Mohammad Khaledur Rahman Tito	Jatiya Party	
88	Jessore-4	Shah Hadiizzzaman	Awami League	
89	Jessore-5	Muhammad Wakkas	Jatiya Party	
90	Jessore-6	Abdul Halim	Awami League	
91	Magura-1	M. A. Matin	Jatiya Party	
92	Magura-2	Mohammad Asaduzzaman	Awami League	
93	Narail-1	SM Abu Sayeed	Jatiya Party	
94	Narail-2	Saif Hafizur Rahman	Jatiya Party	
95	Bagerhat-1	MA Khayer	Awami League	
96	Bagerhat-2	Sheikh Abdur Rahman	Jatiya Party	
97	Bagerhat-3	Aftab Uddin Howlader	Jatiya Party	
98	Bagerhat-4	Altaf Hossain	Jatiya Party	
99	Khulna-1	Sheikh Harunur Rashid	Awami League	
100	Khulna-2	Mohammad Mohsin	Jatiya Party	
101	Khulna-3	Hasina Banu Shirin	Jatiya Party	
102	Khulna-4	Sheikh Shahidur Rahman	Workers Party of Bangladesh	
103	Khulna-5	HMA Gaffar	Jatiya Party	
104	Khulna-6	Momen Uddin Ahmed	Jatiya Party	
105	Shatkhira-1	Syed Kamal Bakht	Awami League	
106	Shatkhira-2	Kazi Shamsur Rahman	Bangladesh Jamaat-e-Islami	
107	Shatkhira-3	Salahuddin Sardar	Salahuddin Sardar	
108	Shatkhira-4	Mansur Ahmed Gazi	Awami League	
109	Shatkhira-5	Sheikh Abul Hossain	Jatiya Party	
110	Barguna-1	Humayun Kabir Hiru	Jatiya Samajtantrik Dal-JSD	
111	Barguna-2	Syed Rahmatur Rob Irtiza Ahsan	Jatiya Party	
112	Barguna-3	Nizam Uddin Ahmed	Awami League	
113	Patuakhali-1	Sardar Abdur Rashid	Jatiya Party	
114	Patuakhali-2	ASM Feroz	Awami League	
115	Patuakhali-3	Anwar Hossain Howlader	Jatiya Party	
116	Patuakhali-4	Abdur Razzak Khan	Jatiya Party	
117	Bhola-1	Naziur Rahman Manzur	Jatiya Party	
118	Bhola-2	Tofail Ahmed	Awami League	
119	Bhola-3	Hafizuddin Ahmed	Jatiya Party	
120	Bhola-4	Saad Zagulul Faruk	Jatiya Party	
121	Barisal-1	Sunil Kumar Gupta	Jatiya Party	
122	Barisal-2	Syed Azizul Haque	Jatiya Party	
123	Barisal-3	Mohammad Abdul Barek	Jatiya Party	
124	Barisal-4	Maidul Islam	Jatiya Party	
125	Barisal-5	M. Matiur Rahman	Jatiya Party	
126	Barisal-6	ABM Ruhul Amin Howlader	Jatiya Party	
127	Jhalakathi-1	Jahangir Kabir	Jatiya Party	
128	Jhalakathi-2	Zulfiker Ali Bhutto	Jatiya Party	
129	Pirojpur-1	Mostafa Jamal Haider	Jatiya Party	
130	Pirojpur-2	Mohammad Monirul Islam Monir	Jatiya Party	
131	Pirojpur-3	Anwar Hossain Manju	Jatiya Party	
132	Pirojpur-4	M. A. Jabbar	Bangladesh Jamaat-e-Islami	
133	Tangail-1	Nizamul Islam	Awami League	
134	Tangail-2	Shamsul Haque Talukder	Jatiya Party	
135	Tangail-3	Shamsur Rahman Khan Shahjahan	Awami League	
136	Tangail-4	Laila Siddiqui	Independent	
137	Tangail-5	Mir Majedur Rahman	Jatiya Party	
138	Tangail-6	Noor Muhammad Khan	Jatiya Party	
139	Tangail-7	Wajid Ali Khan Panni	Jatiya Party	
140	Tangail-8	Shawkat Momen Shahjahan	Awami League	
141	Jamalpur-1	Abdus Sattar	Jatiya Party	
142	Jamalpur-2	Rashed Mosharraf	Awami League	
143	Jamalpur-3	Shafiqul Islam Khoka	Bangladesh Krishak Sramik Awami League	
144	Jamalpur-4	Shah Newaz	Communist Party of Bangladesh	
145	Jamalpur-5	Khalilur Rahman	Awami League	
146	Sherpur-1	Shah Rafiqul Bari Chowdhury	Jatiya Party	
147	Sherpur-2	Abdus Salam	Jatiya Party	
148	Sherpur-3	Khandakar Mohammad Khurram	Jatiya Samajtantrik Dal (Siraj)	
149	Mymensingh-1	Md. Emdadul Haque	Jatiya Party	
150	Mymensingh-2	Md. Shamsul Haque	Awami League	
151	Mymensingh-3	Nurul Amin Khan Pathan	Jatiya Party	
152	Mymensingh-4	Motiur Rahman	Awami League	
153	Mymensingh-5	Shamsul Huda Chaudhury	Jatiya Party	
154	Mymensingh-6	Moslem Uddin	Awami League	
155	Mymensingh-7	Abdus Salam Tarafdar	Awami League	
156	Mymensingh-8	Hashim Uddin Ahmed	Jatiya Party	
157	Mymensingh-9	Rafiq Uddin Bhuiyan	Awami League	
158	Mymensingh-10	Enamul Haque	Jatiya Party	
159	Mymensingh-11	Aman Ullah Chowdhury	Bangladesh Muslim League	
160	Netrokona-1	Sirajul Islam	Awami League	
161	Netrokona-2	Jalal Uddin Talukder	Awami League	
162	Netrokona-3	Fazlur Rahman Khan	Awami League	
163	Netrokona-4	Zubed Ali	Awami League	
164	Netrokona-5	Dewan Shahjahan Eaar Chowdhury	Jatiya Party	
165	Kishoreganj-1	A. K. M. Shamsul Haque	Awami League	
166	Kishoreganj-2	Mohammad Nuruzzaman	Jatiya Party	
167	Kishoreganj-3	Fazlur Rahman	Jatiya Party	
168	Kishoreganj-4	Mujibul Haque	Awami League	
169	Kishoreganj-5	Mohammad Abdul Hamid	Awami League	
170	Kishoreganj-6	AKM Khalequzzaman	Bangladesh Muslim League	
171	Kishoreganj-7	Zillur Rahman	Awami League	
172	Manikganj-1	Mohammad Siddiqur Rahman	Jatiya Party	
173	Manikganj-2	Lutfar Rahman Biswas	Jatiya Party	
174	Manikganj-3	Abdul Malek	Jatiya Party	
175	Manikganj-4	Golam Sarwar Milon	Awami League	
176	Munshiganj-1	Shah Moazzem Hossain	Jatiya Party	
177	Munshiganj-2	Md Korban Ali	Jatiya Party	
178	Munshiganj-3	K.M. Aminul Islam	Independent	
179	Munshiganj-4	Mohiuddin Ahmed	Awami League	
180	Dhaka-1	Shahid Khandaker	Jatiya Party	
181	Dhaka-2	Burhan Uddin Khan	Awami League	
182	Dhaka-3	Mostafa Mohsin Montu	Jatiya Party	
183	Dhaka-4	Syed Abu Hossain Babla	Jatiya Party	
184	Dhaka-5	Mohamed Rahmat Ullah	Awami League	
185	Dhaka-6	Abdur Rahim	Jatiya Party	
186	Dhaka-7	Jahangir Mohammad Adel	Jatiya Party	
187	Dhaka-8	Mohammad Harun ar Rashid	Jatiya Party	
188	Dhaka-9	Mahmudul Hasan	Jatiya Party	
189	Dhaka-10	Sheikh Hasina	Awami League	
190	Dhaka-11	S. A. Khaleque	Jatiya Party	
191	Dhaka-12	Shamsuddoha Khan Majlish	Awami League	
192	Dhaka-13	Khan Mohammad Israfil	Jatiya Party	
193	Gazipur-1	Motiur Rahman	Jatiya Party	
194	Gazipur-2	Hasan Uddin Sarkar	Jatiya Party	
195	Gazipur-3	Md. Hase Uddin Dewan	Jatiya Party	
196	Gazipur-4	Mohammad Shahidullah	Jatiya Party	
197	Narsingdi-1	Samsul Huda Bachchu	Jatiya Party	
198	Narsingdi-2	Ahmadul Kabir	Communist Party of Bangladesh	
199	Narsingdi-3	Kamal Haider	Jatiya Party	
200	Narsingdi-4	Nurul Majid Mahmud Humayun	Independent	
201	Narsingdi-5	Asadul Haq Khasru	National Awami Party	
202	Narayanganj-1	Sultan Uddin Bhuiyan	Jatiya Party	
203	Narayanganj-2	M. A. Awal	Awami League	
204	Narayanganj-3	Mubarak Hossain	Jatiya Party	
205	Narayanganj-4	M. A. Sattar	Jatiya Party	
206	Narayanganj-5	Nasim Osman	Awami League	
207	Rajbari-1	Akkas Ali Miah	Jatiya Party	
208	Rajbari-2	Nazir Hossain Chowdhury	Jatiya Party	
209	Faridpur-1	Shah Mohammad Abu Zafar	Jatiya Party	
210	Faridpur-2	Mohammad AAM Khairuzzaman Mia	Jatiya Party	
211	Faridpur-3	Mohabbat Jan Chowdhury	Bangladesh Krishak Sramik Awami League	
212	Faridpur-4	Mohammad Azharul Haque	Jatiya Party	
213	Faridpur-5	Lutfar Rahman Farooq	Awami League	
214	Gopalganj-1	Sarwar Jan Chowdhury	Jatiya Party	
215	Gopalganj-2	Sheikh Fazlul Karim	Awami League	
216	Gopalganj-3	Kazi Firoz Rashid	Jatiya Party	
217	Madaripur-1	Abul Khair Chowdhury	Awami League	
218	Madaripur-2	Shajahan Khan	Jatiya Party	
219	Madaripur-3	Sheikh Shahidul Islam	Jatiya Party	
220	Shariatpur-1	Sardar AKM Nasiruddin	Independent	
221	Shariatpur-2	TM Giasuddin Ahmed	Jatiya Party	
222	Shariatpur-3	Faruque Alam	Jatiya Party	
223	Sunamganj-1	Prasun Kalin Roy	Communist Party of Bangladesh	
224	Sunamganj-2	Suranjit Sengupta	Ganatantri Party	
225	Sunamganj-3	Faruk Rashid Chowdhury	Communist Party of Bangladesh	
226	Sunamganj-4	Iqbal Hossain Chowdhury	NAP	
227	Sunamganj-5	Abul Hasnat Md. Abdul Hai	Jatiya Party	
228	Sylhet-1	Humayun Rashid Chowdhury	Independent	
229	Sylhet-2	Enamul Haque Chowdhury	Jatiya Party	
230	Sylhet-3	Mohammad Habibur Rahman	Jatiya Party	
231	Sylhet-4	Imran Ahmad	Awami League	
232	Sylhet-5	Mahmudur Rahman Majumdar	Jatiya Party	
233	Sylhet-6	Syed Makbul Hossain	Independent	
234	Moulvibazar-1	Imam Uddin Ahmed	Jatiya Party	
235	Moulvibazar-2	A. N. M. Yusuf	Bangladesh Muslim League	
236	Moulvibazar-3	Azizur Rahman	Awami League	
237	Moulvibazar-4	Mohammad Elias	Bangladesh Muslim League	
238	Habiganj-1	Ismat Ahmed Chowdhury	Awami League	
239	Habiganj-2	Sirajul Hossain Khan	Awami League	
240	Habiganj-3	Chowdhury Abdul Hai	Awami League	
241	Habiganj-4	Syed Mohammad Qaisar	Jatiya Party	
242	Brahmanbaria-1	Mozammel Haque	NAP (Muzzafar)	
243	Brahmanbaria-2	Humayun Kabir	Jatiya Party	
244	Brahmanbaria-3	Humayun Kabir	Jatiya Party	
245	Brahmanbaria-4	Liaquat Ali	Jatiya Party	
246	Brahmanbaria-5	Kazi Md. Anwar Hossain	Jatiya Party	
247	Brahmanbaria-6	Sahidur Rahman	Jatiya Party	
248	Comilla-1	Mohammad Mobarak Ali	Jatiya Party	
249	Comilla-2	Abdur Rashid	Jatiya Party	
250	Comilla-3	Kazi Shah Mofazzal Hossain Kaikobad	Jatiya Party	
251	Comilla-4	AFM Fakhrul Islam Munshi	Jatiya Party	
252	Comilla-5	Mohammad Yunus	Jatiya Party	
253	Comilla-6	Redwan Ahmed	Jatiya Party	
254	Comilla-7	Mohammad A. Akim	Jatiya Party	
255	Comilla-8	Ansar Ahmed	Jatiya Party	
256	Comilla-9	Abul Kalam Mazumdar	Awami League	
257	Comilla-10	Rafiqul Hossain	Jatiya Party	
258	Comilla-11	Omar Ahmed Majumder	Awami League	
259	Comilla-12	Kazi Zafar Ahmed	Jatiya Party	
260	Chandpur-1	Rafiqul Islam Roni	Jatiya Party	
261	Chandpur-2	Shamsul Haque	Jatiya Party	
262	Chandpur-3	Harunur Rashid Khan	Jatiya Party	
263	Chandpur-4	Mizanur Rahman Chowdhury	Jatiya Party	
264	Chandpur-5	Md. Abdur Rob	Jatiya Party	
265	Chandpur-6	Abdul Mannan	Jatiya Party	
266	Feni-1	Zafar Imam	Jatiya Party	
267	Feni-2	Joynal Hazari	Awami League	
268	Feni-3	Majibul Haque Chowdhury	Jatiya Party	
269	Noakhali-1	Moudud Ahmed	Jatiya Party	
270	Noakhali-2	Mostafizur Rahman	Jatiya Samajtantrik Dal	
271	Noakhali-3	Mahmudur Rahman Belayet	Jatiya Party	
272	Noakhali-4	Abdul Malek Ukil	Jatiya Samajtantrik Dal-JSD	
273	Noakhali-5	Hasna Jasimuddin Moudud	Bangladesh Awami League	
274	Noakhali-6	Mohammad Ali	Awami League	
275	Laxmipur-1	A. N. M. Shamsul Islam	Jatiya Party	
276	Laxmipur-2	Chowdhury Khurshid Alam	Jatiya Party	
277	Laxmipur-3	Mohammad Ullah	Jatiya Party	
278	Laxmipur-4	A. S. M. Abdur Rab	Jatiya Party	
279	Chittagong-1	Mosharraf Hossain	Awami League	
280	Chittagong-2	Ainul Kamal	Jatiya Samajtantrik Dal-JSD	
281	Chittagong-3	AKM Shamsul Huda	Awami League	
282	Chittagong-4	Nurul Alam Chowdhury	Awami League	
283	Chittagong-5	Anisul Islam Mahmud	Jatiya Party	
284	Chittagong-6	Salahuddin Quader Chowdhury	Jatiya Party	
285	Chittagong-7	Giasuddin Quader Chowdhury	Jatiya Party	
286	Chittagong-8	Mohammad Ishaq	Jatiya Party	
287	Chittagong-9	Mohammad Sekander Hossain Miah	Jatiya Party	
288	Chittagong-10	Morshed Khan	Awami League	
289	Chittagong-11	Chowdhury Harunur Rashid	Jatiya Party	
290	Chittagong-12	Akhtaruzzaman Chowdhury Babu	Jatiya Party	
291	Chittagong-13	Afsar Uddin Ahmed	National Awami Party	
292	Chittagong-14	Ibrahim Bin Khalil	Awami League	
293	Chittagong-15	Mahmudul Islam Chowdhury	Jatiya Party	
294	Cox's Bazar-1	A. H. Salahuddin Mahmud	Jatiya Party	
295	Cox's Bazar-2	Jahirul Islam	Jatiya Party	
296	Cox's Bazar-3	Didarul Alam Chowdhury	Jatiya Party	
297	Cox's Bazar-4	AHA Gafur Chowdhury	Jatiya Party	
298	Hill Khagrachari	AKM Alim Ullah	Jatiya Party	
299	Hill Rangamati	Binoy Kumar Dewan	Jatiya Party	
300	Hill Bandarban	Maung Shwe Prue Chowdhury	Jatiya Party	

=== Members of the Reserved Women's Seat ===
Sl. No.	Parliamentarian	Seat No.	Party
01	Sultana Rezwan Chowdhury	Seat-01	Jatiya Party
02	Hosne Ara Ahsan	Seat-02	Jatiya Party
03	Noor-E-Hasna Lily Chowdhury	Seat-03	Jatiya Party
04	Anwar Zaman	Seat-04	Jatiya Party
05	Nurun Nahar Parveen	Seat-05	Jatiya Party
06	Firoza Zaman	Seat-06	Jatiya Party
07	Sultana Douha	Seat-07	Jatiya Party
08	Farida Banu	Seat-08	Jatiya Party
09	Ulfat Ara Ayesha Khanom	Seat-09	Jatiya Party
10	Setara Talukdar	Seat-10	Jatiya Party
11	Sultana Zaman Chowdhury	Seat-11	Jatiya Party
12	Shamsun Nahar Shelley	Seat-12	Jatiya Party
13	Syeda Sakina Islam	Seat-13	Jatiya Party
14	Mahmuda Khatun	Seat-14	Jatiya Party
15	Parveen Sultana	Seat-15	Jatiya Party
16	Mamta Wahab	Seat-16	Jatiya Party
17	Sabita Mohammad	Seat-17	Jatiya Party
18	Amina Bari	Seat-18	Jatiya Party
19	Ummey Kawsar Salsabil Hena	Seat-29	Jatiya Party
20	Anwara Begum	Seat-20	Jatiya Party
21	Rabia Bhuiyan	Seat-21	Jatiya Party
22	Syeda Begum Noor Maqsood	Seat-22	Jatiya Party
23	Kamrunnessa Hafeez	Seat-23	Jatiya Party
24	Mina Zaman Chowdhury	Seat-24	Jatiya Party
25	Syeda Hasna Begum	Seat-25	Jatiya Party
26	AJ Enayet Nur	Seat-26	Jatiya Party
27	Raushan Ara Mannan	Seat-27	Jatiya Party
28	Khadija Sufian	Seat-28	Jatiya Party
29	Begum Kamrun Nahar Jafar	Seat-29	Jatiya Party
30	Malti Rani	Seat-30	Jatiya Party
