= Anwara Begum (disambiguation) =

Anwara Begum (born 1948) is a Bangladeshi film actress.

Anwara Begum may also refer to:

- Anwara Begum (academic) (1934/5–2018), academic, first women vice-chancellor and first lady of Bangladesh
- Anwara Begum (politician) (1948/9–2019), Bangladeshi politician
- S. M. Anwara Begum, former chairman of the Department of Political Science at Jagannath University
