= Muhammad Abdul Khaleq =

Bangladeshi politician

- মুহাম্মাদ আব্দুল খালেক

Member of the Bangladesh Parliament for Satkhira-2
- Incumbent
- Assumed office 17 February 2026
- Preceded by: Ashrafuzzaman Ashu

Personal details
- Born: March 1, 1963 (age 63) Satkhira Sadar Upazila, Satkhira District
- Party: Bangladesh Jamaat-e-Islami

Muhammad Abdul Khaleq is a Bangladeshi politician of the Bangladesh Jamaat-e-Islami. He is currently serving as a member of parliament from Satkhira-2.

== Early life ==
Khaleq was born on 1 March 1963 in Satkhira Sadar Upazila in Satkhira District.
