= Abdul Alim (politician) =

Bangladeshi politician

- আব্দুল আলিম

Member of the Bangladesh Parliament for Joypurhat-1
- In office June 1996 – 2006
- Preceded by: Golam Rabbani
- Succeeded by: Mozahar Ali Prodhan

Member of the Bangladesh Parliament for Bogra-1
- In office 1979–1982
- Preceded by: Mafiz Ali Chowdhury
- Succeeded by: Mohammad Abdul Momin Mandal

Personal details
- Born: 1 November 1930 Thaipara, Ppandua, Hoogly District, West Bengal, British India.
- Died: 31 August 2014 (aged 83) BSMMU
- Party: Bangladesh Nationalist Party

Abdul Alim was a Bangladesh Nationalist Party politician and the former member of parliament for Joypurhat-1 and Minister. He was convicted and sentenced to life imprisonment.

== Early life ==
Alim was born 1 November 1930 in Joypurhat District, East Bengal, British India. His father, Abdul Wahed Sarkar was the owner of Islamia Rice in Hoogly Pandua. His family used to live in Thaipara, Pandua, Hooghly District but moved to Joypurhat District soon after the partition of India in 1950.

== Career ==
Alim joined the Muslim League in 1958 and soon became Joint Secretary of the League. He served as the vice-chairman of Bogra District Unit of Muslim League. During the Bangladesh Liberation war he sided with Pakistan and was the chairman of the Joypurhat District unit of East Pakistan Central Peace Committee. He had helped form the Razakar paramilitary unit in Joypurhat. After the Independence of Bangladesh, he was charged under the Collaborators Act.

Alim was elected chairman of Joypurhat Municipality in 1975 and re-elected in 1977. He was elected to parliament from Joypurhat-1 as a Bangladesh Nationalist Party candidate in 1979, 1996, and 2001. In 1978, he served in the Cabinet of President Ziaur Rahman Textiles Minister and Communications Minister. On 27 March 2011, he was arrested on war crimes charges. On 9 July 2012, he trial began on war crimes charges at the International Crimes Tribunal. He was convicted on 17 counts of war crimes and sentenced to life imprisonment.

== Death ==
Alim died on 31 August 2014 in Bangabandhu Sheikh Mujib Medical University, Dhaka, Bangladesh.
