= Md. Habibur Rahman =

Bangladeshi politician, Satkhira -2

Member of Bangladesh Parliament
- In office 1988–1991
- Preceded by: Kazi Shamsur Rahman
- Succeeded by: Kazi Shamsur Rahman

Personal details
- Born: Satkhira
- Died: 2011 Satkhira
- Party: Jatiya Party (Ershad)

Md. Habibur Rahman is a Jatiya Party (Ershad) politician in Bangladesh and a former member of parliament for Satkhira-2.

== Career ==
Rahman was elected to parliament from Satkhira-2 as a Jatiya Party candidate in 1988.
