= List of Hindi songs recorded by K. J. Yesudas =

K. J. Yesudas is an Indian playback singer who has sung over 9,000 songs in various languages. He sung 207 Hindi language film songs. The following is a complete list of his Hindi film and non-film songs:

== 1970s ==
=== 1971 ===
| Film | Song | Composer(s) | Writer(s) | Co-artist(s) |
|---|---|---|---|---|
| Jai Jawan Jai Kisaan | "Dilruba Kya Hua" | A. A. Raj | Qamar Saeed | solo |

=== 1974 ===
| Film | Song | Composer(s) | Writer(s) | Co-artist(s) |
|---|---|---|---|---|
| Roshni Aur Andhera | "Nindiya Mujhse Kyun Hai Door" | Upendra Kumar | K. K. Mishra | Vani Jayram |

=== 1975 ===
| Film | Song | Composer(s) | Writer(s) | Co-artist(s) |
|---|---|---|---|---|
| Baghi Lutera | "Veer Pyare Apne Watan Ke" | M. S. Viswanathan, M. Ranga Rao | Shrikant | Vani Jayram |

=== 1976 ===
| Film | Song | Composer(s) | Writer(s) | Co-artist(s) |
|---|---|---|---|---|
| Chhoti Si Baat | "Jaaneman Jaaneman Tere Do Nayan" | Salil Chowdhury | Yogesh | Asha Bhosle |
| Chitchor | "Aaj Se Pehle, Aaj Se Zyada" | Ravindra Jain | Ravindra Jain | solo |
| Chitchor | "Gori Tera Gaon Bada Pyara" | Ravindra Jain | Ravindra Jain | solo |
| Chitchor | "Jab Deep Jale Aana" | Ravindra Jain | Ravindra Jain | Hemlata |
| Chitchor | "Tu Jo Mere Sur Mein Sur Mila Le" | Ravindra Jain | Ravindra Jain | Hemlata |
| Jesus | "Hosanna Hosanna Hosanna" | K. J. Yesudas, M. S. Viswanathan, Joseph Krishna | Prem Dhawan | Vani Jayram |
| Jesus | "Apni Suli Aap Uthake" | K. J. Yesudas, M. S. Viswanathan, Joseph Krishna | Prem Dhawan | Vani Jayram |
| Jesus | "Dhanya Hai Dharthi Wo Jispe" | K. J. Yesudas, M. S. Viswanathan, Joseph Krishna | Prem Dhawan | Vani Jayram |
| Jesus | "Nazare Mujhse Char Ho" | K. J. Yesudas, M. S. Viswanathan, Joseph Krishna | Prem Dhawan | Vani Jayram |
| Jesus | "Yahudiya Dil Tujhe Diya" | K. J. Yesudas, M. S. Viswanathan, Joseph Krishna | Prem Dhawan | Vani Jayram |
| Mazdoor Zindabad | "Meri Munni Rani So Jaa" | Usha Khanna | Vitthalbhai Patel | solo |

=== 1977 ===
| Film | Song | Composer(s) | Writer(s) | Co-artist(s) |
|---|---|---|---|---|
| Adalaat | "Do Din Ki Jawani Mein Bhi Agar" | Kalyanji–Anandji | Gulshan Bawra | solo |
| Agar | "Jiwan Path Ke Ek Rath Ke Do Pahiye" | Sonik–Omi | Gulshan Bawra | Asha Bhosle |
| Alaap | "Koyi Gaata, Main So Jaata" | Jaidev | Harivansh Rai Bachchan | solo |
| Alaap | "Chand Akela Jaye Sakhi Ri" | Jaidev | Rahi Masoom Raza | solo |
| Alaap | "Chand Akela" | Jaidev | Rahi Masoom Raza | solo |
| Alaap | "Zindagi Ko Sanwarna Hoga" | Jaidev | Rahi Masoom Raza | solo |
| Alaap | "Nai Ri Lagan Aur Meethi Batiyan" | Jaidev | Rahi Masoom Raza | Madhurani, Kumari Faiyaz |
| Alaap | "Mata Saraswati Sharda" | Jaidev | traditional | Dilraj Kaur, Madhurani |
| Alibaba Marjina | "Aa Gaya Alibaba Tujhe Le Jaane Ko" | Usha Khanna | Kulwant Jani | solo |
| Alibaba Marjina | "Main Alibaba" | Usha Khanna | Kulwant Jani | solo |
| Anand Ashram | "Tum Itni Sundar Ho" | Shyamal Mitra | Indeevar | Preeti Sagar |
| Anand Mahal | "Sapna Dekhe Meri Khoye Khoye Naina" | Salil Chowdhury | Yogesh | Sabita Chowdhury |
| Anand Mahal | "Ni Sa Ga Ma Pa Ni" | Salil Chowdhury | Yogesh | solo |
| Anand Mahal | "Om Iti Bramha" | Salil Chowdhury | Yogesh | solo |
| Anand Mahal | "Twamasi Mama Bhushanam" | Salil Chowdhury | Yogesh | solo |
| Anand Mahal | "Aashadhya Prathama Divase" | Salil Chowdhury | Kalidas | solo |
| Charandas | "Haan Dekh Lo Ishq Ka Martaba" | Rajesh Roshan | Rajendra Krishan | Aziz Nazan |
| Darinda | "Pyaar Kar Le Gori" | Kalyanji–Anandji | Indeevar | solo |
| Do Chehere | "Preet Ki Reet Nibhana" | Sonik–Omi | Bharat Vyas | solo |
| Dulhan Wohi Jo Piya Man Bhaaye | "Khushiyan Ji Khushiyan Ho Daman Mein Jiske" | Ravindra Jain | Ravindra Jain | Hemlata, Banasree Sengupta |
| Jadu Tona | "Sawari Saloni Jamna Ka Jeewan" | Hemant Bhosle | Balkavi Bairagi | Asha Bhosle, Shivangi Kolhapure |
| Jadu Tona | "Har Sannata Kuchh Kehti Hai" | Hemant Bhosle | Balkavi Bairagi | Asha Bhosle |
| Jadu Tona | "Aaina Kuchh Toh Bata" | Hemant Bhosle | Aziz Qaisi | solo |
| Meethi Meethi Baatein | "Khush Hai Na O Sajni" | K. Chakravarthy | Prem Dhawan | Vani Jayram |
| Meethi Meethi Baatein | "Hello Hello My Dear" | K. Chakravarthy | Prem Dhawan | Vani Jayram |
| Safed Haathi | "Utho Hey Laal, Utho Hey Narayan Aye" | Ravindra Jain | Ravindra Jain | solo |
| Safed Haathi | "Shikari Raja Aaya Re" | Ravindra Jain | Ravindra Jain | solo |
| Safed Jhooth | "Main Tere Liye Taaron Ke Diye" | Shyamal Mitra | Yogesh | solo |
| Safed Jhooth | "Neele Ambar Ke Tale" | Shyamal Mitra | Yogesh | solo |
| Swami | "Aaj Ki Raat Hogi Kuchh Aisi Baat" | Rajesh Roshan | Amit Khanna | Asha Bhosle |
| Swami | "Ka Karoon Sajni Aaye Na Balam" | Rajesh Roshan | Traditional | solo |

=== 1978 ===
| Film | Song | Composer(s) | Writer(s) | Co-artist(s) |
|---|---|---|---|---|
| Aankhin Dekhi | "Raghuvar Tumko Meri Laaj" | J. P. Kaushik | Tulsidas | solo |
| Bin Baap Ka Beta | "Dono Ka Dil Hai Majboor Pyaar Se" | Basu–Manohari | Majrooh Sultanpuri | Lata Mangeshkar |
| College Girl | "Nahin Chahiye Rang Mahal" | Bappi Lahiri | Bharat Vyas | Chandrani Mukherjee |
| Hazaar Haath | "Dekho Saajan Churaye Hai Mann" | Sharda | Rajdeep | Sharda |
| Hamaara Sansaar | "Laal Gulabi Phoolon Se" | Ravindra Jain | Ravindra Jain | solo |
| Kuhaasa | "Jaane Raaz Yeh Kaisa Hai" | Salil Chowdhury | Yogesh | solo |
| Maa Baap | "Chali Re Gaadi Neri Dekho" | Avinash Vyas | Bharat Vyas | solo |
| Mera Rakshak | "Sabko Chhuti Mili" | Ravindra Jain | Ravindra Jain | Lata Mangeshkar |
| Mera Rakshak | "Tere Hothon Ke Pyaalon Se Jo Chhalke" | Ravindra Jain | Ravindra Jain | Lata Mangeshkar |
| Saajan Bina Suhagan | "Madhubana Khushboo Deta Hai" (version 1) | Usha Khanna | Indeevar | solo |
| Saajan Bina Suhagan | "Madhuban Khushboo Deta Hai" (version 2) | Usha Khanna | Indeevar | solo |
| Saajan Bina Suhagan | "Madhuban Khushboo Deta Hai" (duet) | Usha Khanna | Indeevar | Anuradha Paudwal |
| Sone Ka Dil Lohe Ka Haath | "Sone Ka Dil Lohe Ka Haath" | Usha Khanna | Asad Bhopali | solo |
| Toote Khilone | "Maana Ho Tum Behad Haseen" | Bappi Lahiri | Kaifi Azmi | solo |
| Toote Khilone | "Maana Ho Tum Behad Haseen" (sad) | Bappi Lahiri | Kaifi Azmi | solo |
| Trishul | "Ja Ri Behna Ja | Khayyam | Sahir Ludhianvi | Kishore Kumar & Pamela Chopra |
| Trishul | "Mohabbat Bade Kaam Ki Cheez Hai" | Khayyam | Sahir Ludhianvi | Kishore Kumar, Lata Mangeshkar |
| Trishul | "Aap Ki Maheki Hui Zulf Ko" | Khayyam | Sahir Ludhianvi | Lata Mangeshkar |
| Ulfat | "Ulfat Ki Nayi Manzil Ko Chala" | Kalyanji–Anandji | Qateel Shifai | solo |

=== 1979 ===
| Film | Song | Composer(s) | Writer(s) | Co-artist(s) |
|---|---|---|---|---|
| Dada | "Dil Ke Tukde Tukde Karke" | Usha Khanna | Kulwant Jani | solo |
| Do Chehere | "Preet Ki Reet Nibhana" | Sonik–Omi | Indeevar | solo |
| Do Ladke Dono Kadke | "Kise Khabar Yahan Dagar" | Hemant Bhosle | Yogesh | solo |
| Do Ladke Dono Kadke | "Chanda Ki Doli Mein" | Hemant Bhosle | Yogesh | Asha Bhosle |
| Gopaal Krishna | "Neer Bharan Ka Karke Bahana" | Ravindra Jain | Ravindra Jain | Hemlata |
| Griha Pravesh | "Logon Ke Ghar Mein Rehta Hoon" (version 2) | Kanu Roy | Gulzar | solo |
| Jeena Yahan | "Hum Nahin Dukh Se Ghabrayenge" | Salil Chowdhury | Yogesh | solo |
| Lahu Ke Do Rang | "Zid Na Karo, Ab Na Ruko" (male) | Bappi Lahiri | Farooq Kaiser | solo |
| Mata Velankanni | "Neele Ambar Ke Chhaon Tale" | G. Devarajan | Sameer (III) | P. Susheela |
| Mata Velankanni | "Pyaar Mein Hum Magan Re" | G. Devarajan | Sameer (III) | P. Susheela |
| Naiyya | "O Goriya Tere Aane Se Saj Gayi" | Ravindra Jain | Ravindra Jain | solo |
| Naiyya | "Oonchi Neechi Lehron Ke Kaandhe Pe Chadh Ke" | Ravindra Jain | Ravindra Jain | solo |
| Naiyya | "Geeta Rani Hans De Zara" | Ravindra Jain | Ravindra Jain | Suresh Wadkar |
| Radha Aur Seeta | "Kaun Hai Aisa Jise Phoolon Se" | Ravindra Jain | Ravindra Jain | Hemlata |
| Sawan Ko Aane Do | "Chand Jaise Mukhde Pe" | Raj Kamal | Purushottam Pankaj | solo |
| Sawan Ko Aane Do | "Teri Tasveer Ko" | Raj Kamal | Fauq Jaami | solo |
| Sawan Ko Aane Do | "Jaanam Jaanam" | Raj Kamal | Fauq Jaami | solo |
| Sawan Ko Aane Do | "Tujhe Dekh Kar" | Raj Kamal | Indeevar | solo |
| Sawan Ko Aane Do | "Tere Bin Soona" | Raj Kamal | Abhilash | solo |
| Sawan Ko Aane Do | "Bole To Baansuri" | Raj Kamal | Pooran Kumar Hosh | solo |
| Sawan Ko Aane Do | "Kajre Ki Baati" | Raj Kamal | Maya Govind | Sulakshana Pandit |
| Shikshaa | "Teri Chhoti Si Ek Bhool Ne" | Bappi Lahiri | Gauhar Kanpuri | solo |
| Solva Sawan | "Bua Bakri Laayi Handi" | Jaidev | Naqsh Lyallpuri | Anuradha Paudwal |

== 1980s ==
=== 1980 ===
| Film | Song | Composer(s) | Writer(s) | Co-artist(s) |
|---|---|---|---|---|
| Apne Paraye | "Gaao Mere Mann Chahe Surah Chamke" | Bappi Lahiri | Yogesh | Asha Bhosle |
| "Shyam Rang Ranga Re" | | Solo | | |
| Ek Baar Kaho | "Char Din Ki Zindagi Hai" | Bappi Lahiri | Maya Govind | solo |
| Khwab | "Banjara Main Nahin Magar" | Ravindra Jain | Ravindra Jain | solo |
| Khwab | "Hum Khwab Ko Badal denge Haqeeqat Mein" | Ravindra Jain | Ravindra Jain | Hemlata |
| Kismat | "Yeh Zindagi Chaman Hai" | Bappi Lahiri | Amit Khanna | solo |
| Maan Abhiman | "Ek But Se Mahobbat Kar Ke" | Ravindra Jain | Ravindra Jain | solo |
| Maan Abhiman | "Aye Mere Udaas Mann" | Ravindra Jain | Ravindra Jain | solo |
| Paayal Ki Jhankaar | "Dekho Kanha Nahin Maanat" | Raj Kamal | Maya Govind | Sulakshana Pandit |
| Saajan Mere Main Saajan Ki | "Na Jaane Aise Ho Gaya Kaise" | Ravindra Jain | Ravindra Jain | Hemlata |

=== 1981 ===
| Film | Song | Composer(s) | Writer(s) | Co-artist(s) |
|---|---|---|---|---|
| Bhaagya | "Samarpan Ki Ghadi Hai" | Ravindra Jain | Ravindra Jain | solo |
| Chashme Buddoor | "Kali Ghodi Dwaar Khadi" | Raj Kamal | Indu Jain | Haimanti Shukla |
| Chashme Buddoor | "Kahan Se Aaye Badra" | Raj Kamal | Indu Jain | Haimanti Shukla |
| Kaaran | "Saawan Aag Lagaye Re" | Usha Khanna | Indeevar | solo |
| Kahani Ek Chor Ki | "Chor Choron Ko Pakadte Phiren" | K. J. Yesudas | K. J. Yesudas | Hemlata, Mahendra Kapoor |
| Naari | "Neeche Zameen Oopar Gagan" | Shankar–Jaikishan | M G Hashmat | Amit Kumar |
| Nai Imarat | "Pyaar Ka Paras Paas Tumhare" | Bappi Lahiri | Indeevar | Chandrani Mukherjee |

=== 1982 ===
| Film | Song | Composer(s) | Writer(s) | Co-artist(s) |
|---|---|---|---|---|
| Ayaash | "Kaali Nagan Dasegi" | Ravindra Jain | Anand Bakshi | Manna Dey |
| Ayaash | "Yeh Subaah Suhani Ho" | Ravindra Jain | Anand Bakshi | solo |
| Baawri | "Ab Charaghon Ja Koi Kaam Nahin" | Khayyam | Maya Govind | Lata Mangeshkar |
| Dil Ka Sathi Dil | "Mere Prem Ki Gaaye" | Salil Chowdhury | Madhukar Rajasthani | S. Janaki |
| Dil Ka Sathi Dil | "Pyaar Mein Jo Bhi Dukh Do, Sahoonga Main" | Salil Chowdhury | Madhukar Rajasthani | solo |
| Dil Ka Sathi Dil | "Saagar Nidhaal Ho Gaya" | Salil Chowdhury | Madhukar Rajasthani | solo |
| Dil Ka Sathi Dil | "Yeh Maatam Ki Dhun" | Salil Chowdhury | Madhukar Rajasthani | solo |
| Do Disayen | "Koi Kya Kare" (version 1) | Laxmikant–Pyarelal | Anand Bakshi | solo |
| Do Disayen | "Koi Kya Kare" (version 2) | Laxmikant–Pyarelal | Anand Bakshi | solo |
| Do Disayen | "Koi Kya Kare" (version 3) | Laxmikant–Pyarelal | Anand Bakshi | solo |
| Jawalaa Dahej Ki | "Arthi Ban Ke Dulhan Ki" | Chitragupt | Anjaan | solo |
| Lubna | "Yun Bhi Hota Hai" | Manas Mukherjee | Nida Fazli | solo |
| Lubna | "Lubna" | Manas Mukherjee | Nida Fazli | solo |
| Pratisodh | "Pyar Do, Pyar Do, Na Rang Do" | Ravindra Jain | B. R. Tripathi | solo |
| Sun Sajna | "Sun Sajna" (part 1) | Raam Laxman | Ravinder Rawal | Anuradha Paudwal |
| Sun Sajna | "Sun Sajna" (part 2) | Raam Laxman | Ravinder Rawal | Anuradha Paudwal |
| Sun Sajna | "Yamma Ee Yamma Oo" | Raam Laxman | Ravinder Rawal | Usha Mangeshkar |

=== 1983 ===
| Film | Song | Composer(s) | Writer(s) | Co-artist(s) |
|---|---|---|---|---|
| Door Desh | "Aap To Aise Na The" | Usha Khanna | Indeevar | Lata Mangeshkar |
| Door Desh | "Hare Rama Hare Rama" | Usha Khanna | Indeevar | Usha Mangeshkar, Chandrani Mukherjee |
| Jeet Hamaari | "Aapne Mujh Mein Kya Dekha" | Bappi Lahiri | Indeevar | S. Janaki, S. P. Balasubrahmanyam |
| Sadma | "Surmayi Ankhiyon Mein" | Ilaiyaraaja | Gulzar | solo |
| Sadma | "Surmayi Ankhiyon Mein" (sad) | Ilaiyaraaja | Gulzar | solo |
| Sampark | "In Balkhaati Raahon Pe" | Ravindra Jain | Yogesh | solo |
| Sampark | "Mere Bhaiya Ki Hai Shaadi" | Ravindra Jain | Yogesh | Hemlata |
| Sant Ravidas Ki Amar Kahani | "Sachche Hi Sada" | Chitragupt | Uday Khanna | Aarti Mukherjee |
| Sant Ravidas Ki Amar Kahani | "Shyam Salone" | Chitragupt | Uday Khanna | Usha Mangeshkar |
| Zara Si Zindagi | "Jise Maut Aayi" | Laxmikant–Pyarelal | Anand Bakshi | solo |

=== 1984 ===
| Film | Song | Composer(s) | Writer(s) | Co-artist(s) |
|---|---|---|---|---|
| Abodh | "Saamba Sada Shiv" | Ravindra Jain | Ravindra Jain | solo |
| Dhokhebaaz | "Tere Hi Khwabon Mein" (duet) | Ravindra Jain | Ravindra Jain | Hemlata |
| Dhokhebaaz | "Tere Hi Khwabon Mein" (male) | Ravindra Jain | Ravindra Jain | solo |
| Divorce | "Dheere Dheere Bolo" | Usha Khanna | Vitthalbhai Patel | Asha Bhosle |
| Ek Nai Paheli | "Zindagi Ke Is Safar Ki" | Laxmikant–Pyarelal | Anand Bakshi | solo |
| Grahasthi | "Kaisi Bhi Kanya Se" | Ravindra Jain | Ravindra Jain | Suresh Wadkar |
| Haisiyat | "Dheere Dheere Subah Huyi" (male) | Bappi Lahiri | Indeevar | solo |
| Hip Hip Hurray | "Ek Subah Ek Mod Par" | Vanraj Bhatia | Gulzar | K. J. Yesudas |
| Meri Adalat | "Gudiya Jaisi Behna" | Bappi Lahiri | Indeevar | Usha Mangeshkar |
| Phulwari | "Chanchal Naina Mohini Chitvan" | Raj Kamal | Govind Moonis | solo |
| Phulwari | "Sanwari Saloni Aisi" | Raj Kamal | Govind Moonis | solo |
| Phulwari | "Jaan Marelo, Goliyan Kamaal Karelo" | Raj Kamal | Govind Moonis | solo |
| Phulwari | "Mausam Kitna Pyara Hai" | Raj Kamal | Govind Moonis | Haimanti Sukla |
| Sasural | "Sun Sun Gaaon Ki Gori" | Ravindra Jain | Ravindra Jain | solo |
| Zindagi Jeene Ke Liye | "Allah Se Keh Ke Dukh Door" | Rajesh Roshan | Rajesh Roshan | solo |

=== 1985 ===
| Film | Song | Composer(s) | Writer(s) | Co-artist(s) |
|---|---|---|---|---|
| Aaj Ka Daur | "Yeh Daur Aaj Ka Daur" | Bappi Lahiri | Indeevar | solo |
| Alag Alag | "Ram Rahim Mein Antar Nahi" | R D Burman | Anand Bakshi | Asha Bhosle |
| Bahu Ki Awaaz | "Na Chand Na Maang" | Vijay Batalvi | Rajendra Verma, Bhim Sain, Shabab Alawalpuri | Anuradha Paudwal |
| Bahu Ki Awaaz | "Chand Ko Bana Ke" | Vijay Batalvi | Rajendra Verma, Bhim Sain, Shabab Alawalpuri | Anuradha Paudwal |
| Haveli | "Mujhse Mat Poochho Sanam" | Bappi Lahiri | Farooq Kaiser | solo |
| Kala Suraj | "Apni Bahon Ka Haar De" | Bappi Lahiri | Kulwant Jani | Sulakshana Pandit |
| Maha Shaktimaan | "Ang Ang Mein Chand Bhare Hai" | Bappi Lahiri | Indeevar | Kavita Krishnamurthy |
| Pataal Bhairavi | "Ek Bechara Phas Gaya Jal Mein" (part 1) | Bappi Lahiri | Indeevar | solo |
| Pataal Bhairavi | "Ek Bechara Phas Gaya Jal Mein" (part 2) | Bappi Lahiri | Indeevar | solo |
| Sur Sangam | "Manjhi Re, Manjhi Re" | Laxmikant–Pyarelal | Vasant Dev | solo |
| Yaar Kasam | "Rang Ras Barse Haye Dheere Dheere" | Usha Khanna | Ram Bhardwaj | Usha Khanna |

=== 1986 ===
| Film | Song | Composer(s) | Writer(s) | Co-artist(s) | |
|---|---|---|---|---|---|
| Babul | "Main Hoon Teri Son Chiriya" | Ravindra Jain | Ravindra Jain | Hemlata | |
| Babul | "Teri Khushi Hai Meri Khushi" | Ravindra Jain | Ravindra Jain | Hemlata | |
| Babul | "Teri Bholi Muskanon Ne" (sad) | Ravindra Jain | Ravindra Jain | Hemlata | |
| Babul | "Teri Bholi Muskanon Ne" (version 1) | Ravindra Jain | Ravindra Jain | solo | |
| Babul | "Teri Bholi Muskanon Ne" (version 2) | Ravindra Jain | Ravindra Jain | solo | |
| Majnun | "Mohabbat Ki Yehi Dastaan Hai" | Khayyam | B/A | solo | |
| Majnun | "Yeh Haseen Raat Toh" | Khayyam | B/A | solo | Lata Mangeshkar |
| Shart | "Zindagi Hai, Zindagi Se Khelo" (happy) | Bappi Lahiri | Kaifi Azmi | solo | |
| Shart | "Zindagi Hai, Zindagi Se Khelo" (sad) | Bappi Lahiri | Kaifi Azmi | solo | |

=== 1987 ===
| Film | Song | Composer(s) | Writer(s) | Co-artist(s) |
|---|---|---|---|---|
| Itihaas | "Aao Tumje Pyaar Karen" | R D Burman | Anand Bakshi | Kavita Krishnamurthy |

=== 1988 ===
| Film | Song | Composer(s) | Writer(s) | Co-artist(s) |
|---|---|---|---|---|
| Bandhan Baahon Ka | "Hey Naraina" (male) | Ravindra Jain | Ravindra Jain | solo |
| Bandhan Baahon Ka | "Na Koi Akbar, Na Koi Babar" | Ravindra Jain | Ravindra Jain | Hemlata |
| Chintamani Surdas | "Nero Mann Anat Kahan" | Ravindra Jain | Surdas | solo |
| Gharwali Baharwali | "Yauwan Chhalke Yun Tan Se" | Bappi Lahiri | Indeevar | solo |
| Hatya | "Zindagi Mehak Jaati Hai" | Bappi Lahiri | Indeevar | Lata Mangeshkar |

=== 1989 ===
| Film | Song | Composer(s) | Writer(s) | Co-artist(s) |
|---|---|---|---|---|
| Aakhri Ghulam | "Maalik Mere Hothon Pe Sab Se" | Bappi Lahiri | Anjaan | solo |
| Galiyon Ka Badshah | "Kya Kahoon, Kya Na Kahoon" | Kalyanji–Anandji | Indeevar | Sadhana Sargam |

== 1990-present ==
| Year | Film | Song | Composer(s) | Writer(s) | Co-artist(s) | |
|---|---|---|---|---|---|---|
| 1991 | Hum To Pyaar Karenge | "Aise Hasrat Se Na Dekho" | Babul Bose | Ravinder Rawal | Anuradha Paudwal | |
| 1991 | Hum To Pyaar Karenge | "Ab Ke Baras Yeh Sawan Ki Jhadi" | Babul Bose | Ravinder Rawal | Anuradha Paudwal | |
| 1991 | Pyaar Ka Saawan | "Sur Lagao" | Ravindra Jain | Ravindra Jain | Askaranjee | |
| 1991 | Pyaar Ka Saawan | "Jo Baithe Charnon Mein" | Ravindra Jain | Ravindra Jain | Anup Jalota | |
| 1991 | Pyaar Ka Saawan | "Do Matwale Sarayu Kinare" | Ravindra Jain | Ravindra Jain | Anup Jalota | |
| 1991 | Pyaar Ka Saawan | "Ek Sadak Chhap Se" | Ravindra Jain | Ravindra Jain | Dilraj Kaur | |
| 1991 | Pyaar Ka Saawan | "Do Matware" (version 2) | Ravindra Jain | Ravindra Jain | Aarti Mukherjee | |
| 1991 | Pyaar Ka Saawan | "Do Matware" (version 3) | Ravindra Jain | Ravindra Jain | Aarti Mukherjee | |
| 1991 | Pyaar Ka Saawan | "Do Matware" (version 4) | Ravindra Jain | Ravindra Jain | solo | |
| 1991 | Pyaar Ka Saawan | "Is Paar Gange" | Ravindra Jain | Ravindra Jain | solo | P K Mishra |
| 1992 | Kaal Bhairav | "Chetna Jagao, Meri Chetna" | Ravindra Jain | Ravindra Jain | solo | |
| 1992 | Kaal Bhairav | "Hai Nain Hairaat Mein Pad Gayi" | Ravindra Jain | Ravindra Jain | Hemlata | |
| 1992 | Kaal Bhairav | "Sun Re Sajan Main Pyasi" | Ravindra Jain | Ravindra Jain | Hemlata | |
| 1992 | Meera Ka Mohan | "Teri Chanchal Chanchal Aankhon" | Arun Paudwal | Indeevar | Anuradha Paudwal | |
| 1993 | Nargis | "Dono Ke Dil Hain, Majboor Pyaar Se" (version 2) | Basu Chakravarthy | Majrooh Sultanpuri | Lata Mangeshkar | |
| 1994 | Mohini | "Viraha Dasha Meri" | Ravindra Jain | Ravindra Jain | Alka Yagnik | |
| 1994 | Mohini | "Alaap" (version 1) | Ravindra Jain | Ravindra Jain | | |
| 1994 | Mohini | "Alaap" (version 2) | Ravindra Jain | Ravindra Jain | | |
| 1994 | Mr. Azaad | "Saathi Bin Kaise Kaate" | Bappi Lahiri | Indeevar | solo | |
| 1994 | Ulfat Ki Nayee Manzilen | "Ulfat Ki Nayee Manzil Ko Chala" | Kalyanji–Anandji | Qateel Shifai | solo | |
| 1995 | Jai Hariharputra Ayyappaa | "Hari Ki Maya Ka Avtar" | K. V. Mahadevan | P. B. Srinivas | solo | |
| 1995 | Jai Hariharputra Ayyappaa | "Das Hain Tere" | K. V. Mahadevan | P. B. Srinivas | solo | |
| 1995 | Jai Hariharputra Ayyappaa | "Jai Jai Sabrishwar" | K. V. Mahadevan | P. B. Srinivas | solo | |
| 1995 | Jai Hariharputra Ayyappaa | "Jai Parmeshwar Jai" | K. V. Mahadevan | P. B. Srinivas | solo | |
| 1996 | Daayraa | "Chhute Nahin Chhute Na" | Anand–Milind | Gulzar | solo | |
| 1996 | Daayraa | "Palkon Pe Chalte Chalte" (male) | Anand–Milind | Gulzar | solo | |
| 1996 | Hindustani | "Pyare Panchhi Ban mein, Gaati Koyal Rahon Mein" | A. R. Rahman | P. K. Mishra | solo | |
| 1997 | Daud | "O Bhavre" | A. R. Rahman | Mehboob | Asha Bhosle | |
| 1998 | Swami Vivekananda | "Sanyasi Talaasi Jiski Hai" | Salil Chowdhury | Gulzar | Asha Bhosle | |
| 2006 | Radha Ne Mala Japi Shyam Ki | "Treta Mein Ram Huye" | Ravindra Jain | | solo | |
| 2006 | Shiva | "Josh Mein" (version 1) | Ilaiyaraaja | Nitin Raikwar | solo | |
| 2006 | Shiva | "Josh Mein" (version 2) | Ilaiyaraaja | Nitin Raikwar | solo | |
| 2010 | Lavakusa – The Warrior Twins | "Satya Sanathan Dharma Parayan" | L. Vaidyanathan | P. K. Mishra, Dharmesh Tiwari | Vijay Yesudas | |
| 2012 | Baashha | "Chehre Pe Dhup" | Deva | Indeevar | Kavita Krishnamoorthy | |
