= Khandakar Oliuzzaman Alam =

Bangladeshi politician

Member of Bangladesh Parliament
- In office 1988–1990
- Preceded by: Abbas Ali Mandal
- Succeeded by: Golam Rabbani

Personal details
- Party: Jatiya Party (Ershad)

Khandakar Oliuzzaman Alam is a Jatiya Party (Ershad) politician in Bangladesh and a former member of parliament for Joypurhat-1. Alam was elected to parliament from Joypurhat-1 as a Jatiya Party candidate in 1988.
