= Ali Ahmed =

Ali Ahmed may refer to:

- Ali Ahmed (Bangladeshi politician)
- Ali Ahmed (Pakistani politician)
- Knud Holmboe (1902–1931), convert to Islam and murder victim, changed his name to Ali Ahmed
- Ali Ahmed (actor) (born 1971), Maldivian actor
- Ali Ahmed (archer) (born 1973), Qatari archer
- Ali Ahmed (cricketer) (born 1994), Dutch cricketer
- Ali Ahmed (soccer) (born 2000), Canadian soccer player
- Fakhruddin Ali Ahmed (1905–1977), President of India from 1974 to 1977

== See also ==
- Eli Ahmed, Indian writer, film director and costume designer
- Ali Ahmad (disambiguation)
