= Charkhanpur =

Arid region in Bangladesh

Charkhanpur desrert Western dry region
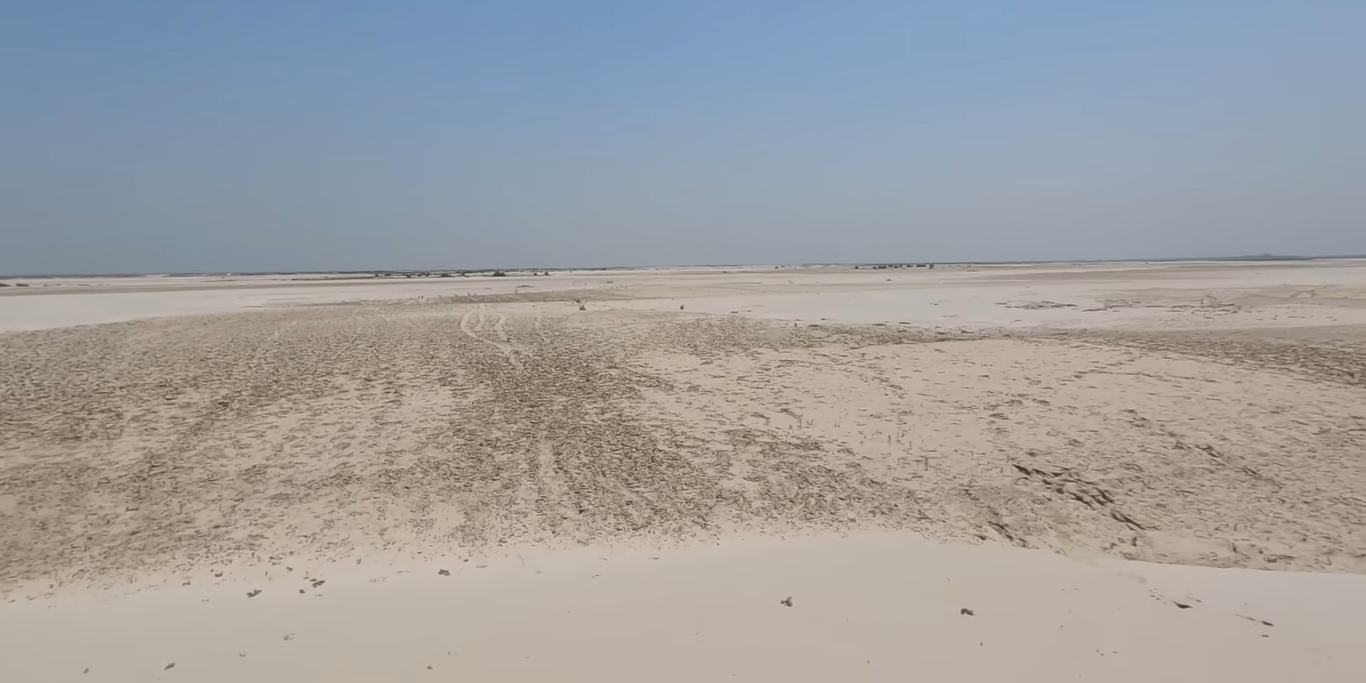

Ecology
- Realm: Indomalayan
- Biome: Deserts and xeric shrublands

Geography
- Area: 89 km^{2} (34 mi^{2})
- Country: Bangladesh
- State: Rajshahi
- Elevation: 23 meter
- Rivers: Padma
- Climate type: Hot
- Soil types: White

Charkhanpur (also known as Char khidirpur) is an arid area at Rajshahi, Bangladesh. It may be the only desert type area in whole Bangladesh. Charkhanpur is a very rural and remote region of Rajshahi division. Situated at the north-western region of Bangladesh, it covers a small area about 8,800 hectares or 88 km^{2} of dry area.

It lies beside the Padma river which overflow some areas of Charkhanpur in the rainy season, but it remains mostly a vast sandy land most of the year. There is a small population at Charkhanpur. People living there mostly depend on cattle farming and some go to work in the city of Rajshahi daily. A few visitors go there but very few people know that remote place. It makes the place more special and mysterious. Charkhanpur is a place of extreme climate which makes it hard to survive there.

== Location ==
Charkhanpur desert is only 1.5 km away from Rajshahi city but the Padma River makes it hard to reach there. It is situated between latitude of 24°00'43.8" N to Longitude of 89°05'1.52" E. Charkhanpur shares border with murshidabad district of India at North,west and south and Rajshahi city at East. Padma river pass through the region at east.

== Climate ==
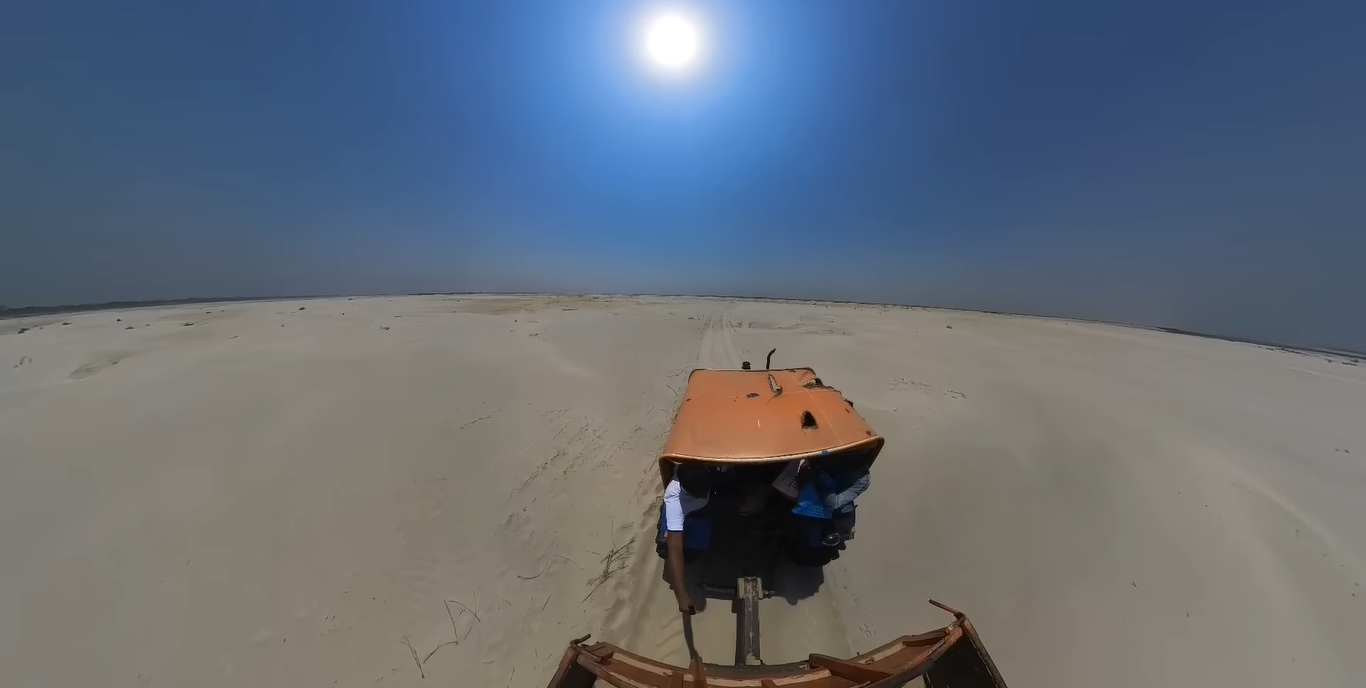
A hot day with 45 degree Celsius at Charkhanpur

Charkhanpur maintains a hot climate at summer season. The temperature here easily cross 40 degree Celsius, while average remains between 43 and 45 degree. The surface temperature may hit near 50 degree Celsius.

The warmest month is May (35 °C / 95 °F), coldest month is January (7 °C / 44.6 °F), wettest month is July (300 mm / 171.81 in) and driest month is December with no rain percentage.

== Geography ==
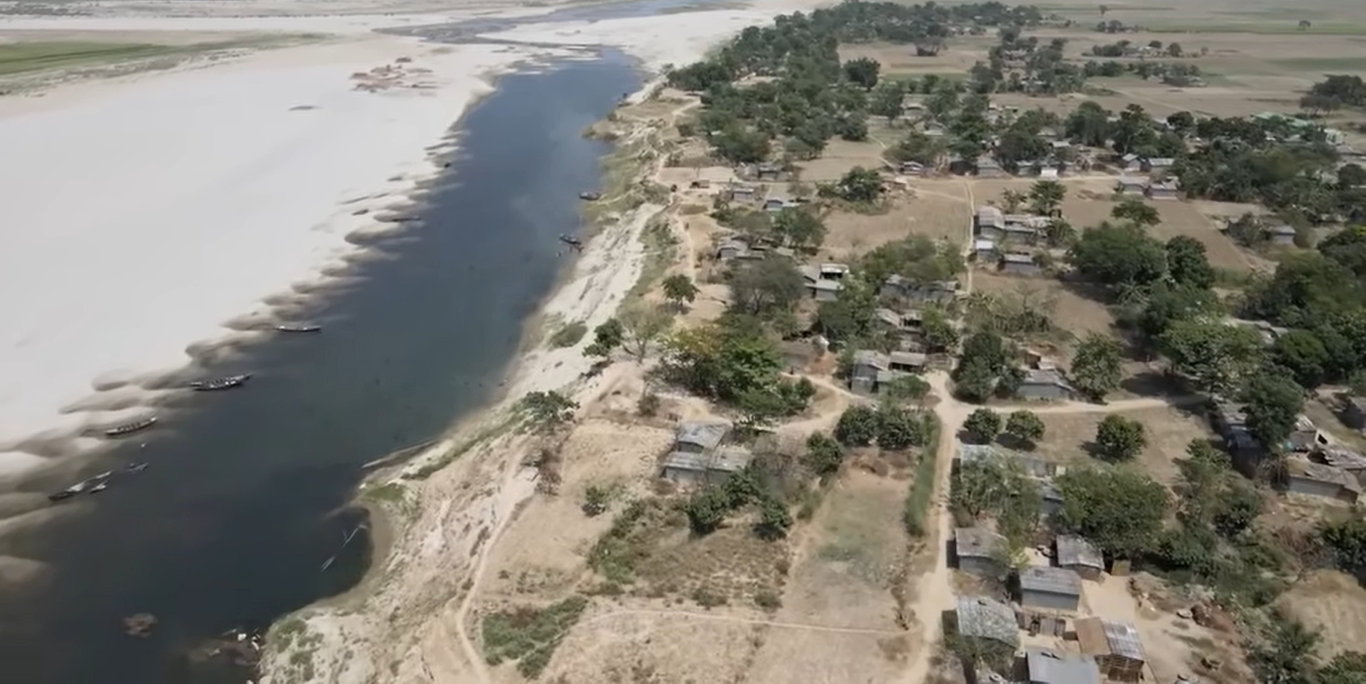
Drone view

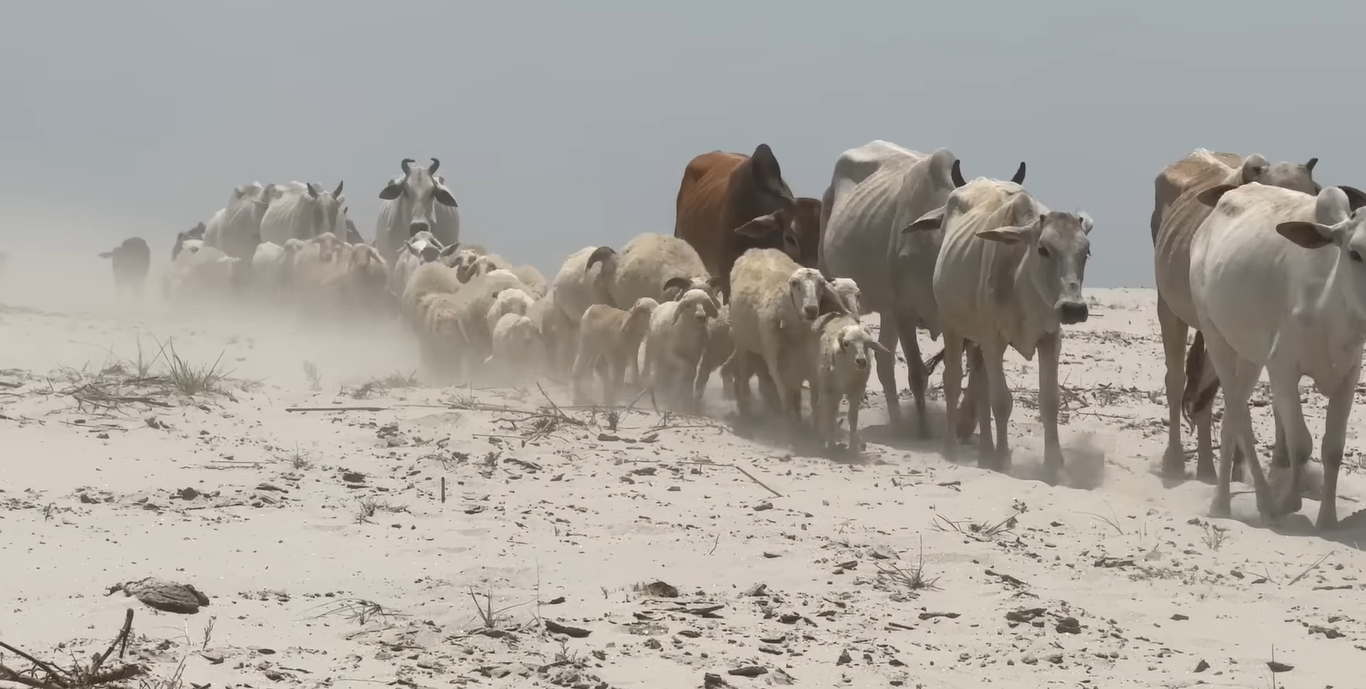
Cattles at sand

Charkhanpur is located in the western part of Rajshahi District, close to the border with India. This area is characterized by a semi-arid climate, making it one of the driest regions in Bangladesh. The terrain is relatively flat with occasional undulating lands and sandy soil, and it often resembles dry, desert-like landscapes.

Rainfall in Charkhanpur is low compared to other parts of the country, especially during the non-monsoon months. The region receives most of its rain during the monsoon season, but the annual precipitation is still limited, often falling below 1,200 mm. Due to this, the natural vegetation consists mainly of drought-resistant plants, along with sparse shrubs and grasses.

The soil is generally loamy to sandy, with poor water retention, which further contributes to the arid nature of the land. Agriculture is challenging without irrigation, and much of the landscape is left as fallow or used for grazing.

Charkhanpur's location near the Barind Tract—a high, old alluvial region—adds to its unique geographic and environmental characteristics. The area is gradually being studied for climate adaptation, water conservation, and dryland farming possibilities.

== Biodiversity ==
=== Flora ===
Its hard to find tree species at an arid condition like charkhanpur, Very few trees can survive at a desert type dry area. Still one can find trees like Babla (Acacia arabica), Jhau (Casuarina), Neem (Azadirachta indica), Shimul (Bombax ceiba) at Charkhanpur. Some grass and herb species are also present there.

=== Faunna ===
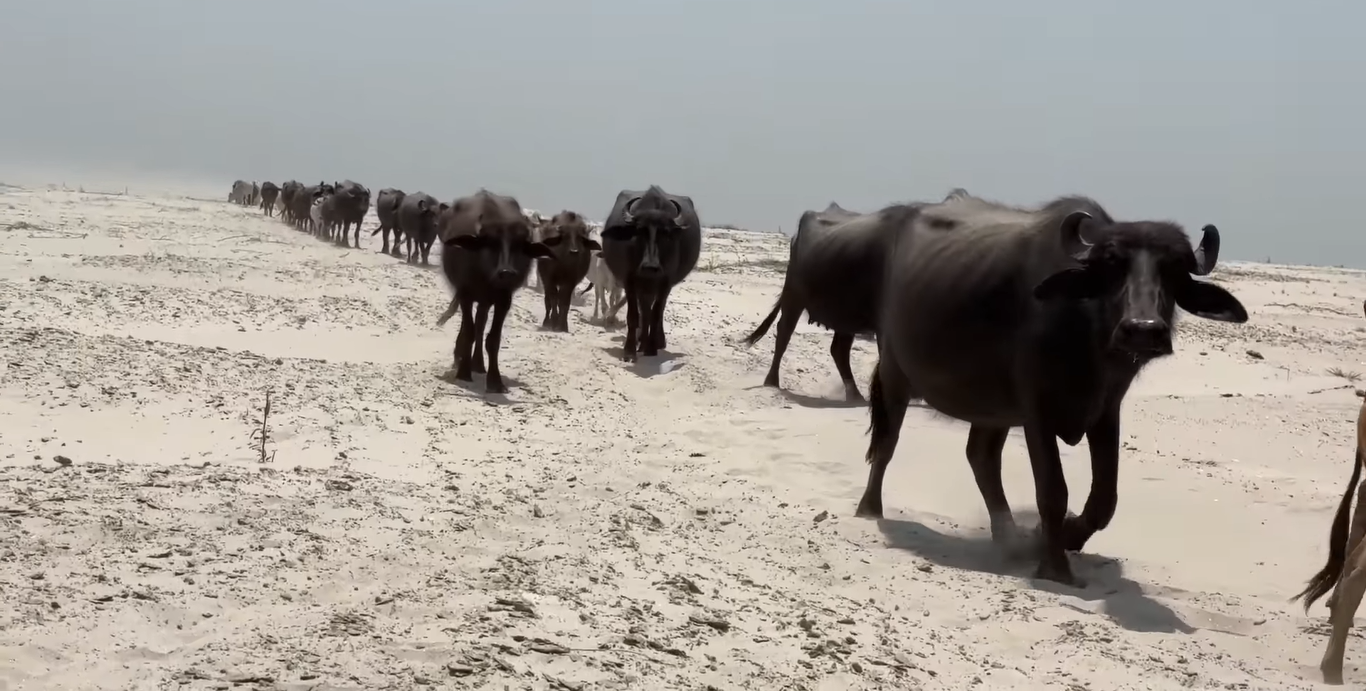
Buffalo searching for water in Charkhanpur.

There is some selective species of cattle bread at charkhanpur. One can find the long line of cow, buffalo, sheep and goat searching for water here which is an extreme scenario.

== See also ==
- Desert
- North Bengal Province
