= Abdul Khaleque Mondal =

Bangladeshi politician and convicted war criminal (1944–2023)

- আব্দুল খালেক মন্ডল

Personal details
- Born: 1 August 1944 Satkhira, Bengal, British India
- Died: 23 July 2023 (aged 78) Khulna District Jail, Khulna, Bangladesh
- Education: University of Dhaka; Satkhira Government College

Member of Parliament for Satkhira-2
- In office 28 October 2001 – 27 October 2006
- Preceded by: Kazi Shamsur Rahman
- Succeeded by: M. A. Jabbar

Personal details
- Party: Bangladesh Jamaat-e-Islami

Abdul Khaleque Mondal (1 August 1944 – 23 July 2023) was a politician of Bangladesh Jamaat-e-Islami and was a Jatiya Sangsad member, representing the Satkhira-2 constituency from 2001 to 2006. On 24 March 2022, he was sentenced to death for crimes against humanity, including murder, rape, detention and torture.

== Early life and education ==
Abdul Khaleque Mondal was born on 1 August 1944 in Khalilnagar, Baikari Union, Satkhira, to Chan Mandal and Diljan Bibi. He passed Kamil from madrasa in 1965 and passed BA from Satkhira Government College in 1969. He later earned a master's degree in Islamic studies from the University of Dhaka.

== Career ==
Mondal was the principal of Agardari Kamil Madrasa in Satkhira. He was associated with the then-student organization Islami Chhatra Sangha of Jamaat-e-Islami. He was the Ameer of Jamaat's Satkhira district and a member of the Central Majlis Shura. He was elected to the parliament representing the Satkhira-2 constituency as a Bangladesh Jamaat-e-Islami candidate in 2001. He lost the election in 2008 to the Jatiya Party candidate M. A. Jabbar.

== War crimes and convictions ==
The Daily Star accused him of supporting Ahle Hadith Andolon Bangladesh, an extremist group.

In July 2009, Nazrul Islam Gazi from Shimulbarhia village filed a case against Mondal for killing his father Rustam Ali during the 1971 Bangladesh Liberation War.

Mandal was arrested on 16 June 2015 at a madrasa at Sadar Upazila on charges of planning to orchestrate violence. On 21 August, he was shown arrested in the war crime charges investigated at the International Crimes Tribunal. On 24 March 2022, Mondal was sentenced to death for the war crimes and crimes against humanity, including murder, rape, detention and torture. He had served in the paramilitary Razakar unit during the war.

== Death ==
Abdul Khaleque Mondal died on 23 July 2023, at the age of 78.
