= Shamsul Haque (Satkhira politician) =

Bangladeshi politician

- শামছুল হক

Member of Parliament for Satkhira-2
- In office 15 February 1996 – 12 June 1996
- Preceded by: Kazi Shamsur Rahman
- Succeeded by: Kazi Shamsur Rahman

Personal details
- Born: Satkhira District
- Party: Bangladesh Nationalist Party

Shamsul Haque was a politician of Satkhira District of Bangladesh, a lawyer, and a former member of parliament for the Satkhira-2 constituency in February 1996.

== Career ==
Shamsul Haque was a lawyer. He was the district president of the Satkhira unit of the Bangladesh Nationalist Party. He was arrested in Satkhira on 22 February 1952 in connection with the Bengali language movement.

He was elected to parliament from Satkhira-2 as a Bangladesh Nationalist Party candidate in the 15 February 1996 Bangladeshi general election.

In the first parliamentary elections of 1973, he was defeated by the then Khulna-13 constituency with the nomination of the National Awami Party, and in the second parliamentary elections of 1979 with the nomination of the Bangladesh Nationalist Party from the then Khulna-14 constituency.
