= Mir Mostaque Ahmed Robi =

Bangladeshi politician

- মীর মোস্তাক আহমেদ রবি

10th & 11th Member of Parliament, Satkhira-2
- In office 2014–2023
- Preceded by: M. A. Jabbar
- Succeeded by: Ashrafuzzaman Ashu

Personal details
- Born: 21 January 1954 (age 72) Munjitpur, Satkhira district, Bangladesh
- Party: Bangladesh Awami League
- Children: 1
- Occupation: Politician, Businessman, Social Worker

Freedom Fighter Mir Mostaque Ahmed Robi (Bengali: মীর মোস্তাক আহমেদ রবি; born: 21 January 1954) is a Bangladesh Awami League politician and former Member of Parliament from Satkhira-2.

== Political life ==
Mir Mostaque Ahmed Robi is a brave freedom fighter. He has been elected Member of Parliament twice from Satkhira-2 Constituency. Currently, he is serving as the Vice President of the Satkhira District Awami League. While he was an MP, there are allegations against him of trading in the recruitment of various schools and colleges in his area. In the Baikari Union of Satkhira Sadar, there is a heroic freedom fighter named Mir Mostaque Ahmed Robi Adarsh College named after him. Due to the illness of Satkhira District Awami League President Al-haj AK Fazlul Haque, he served as acting president of the Satkhira District Awami League for some days.

== Early life ==
Freedom Fighter ‘Mir Mostaque Ahmed Robi’ was born on 21 January 1954. And Robi's ancestral home is located in Munjitpur village in Satkhira Sadar Upazila of Satkhira District.
