= AM Riasat Ali Biswas =

Bangladeshi politician

- এ এম রিয়াছাত আলী বিশ্বাস
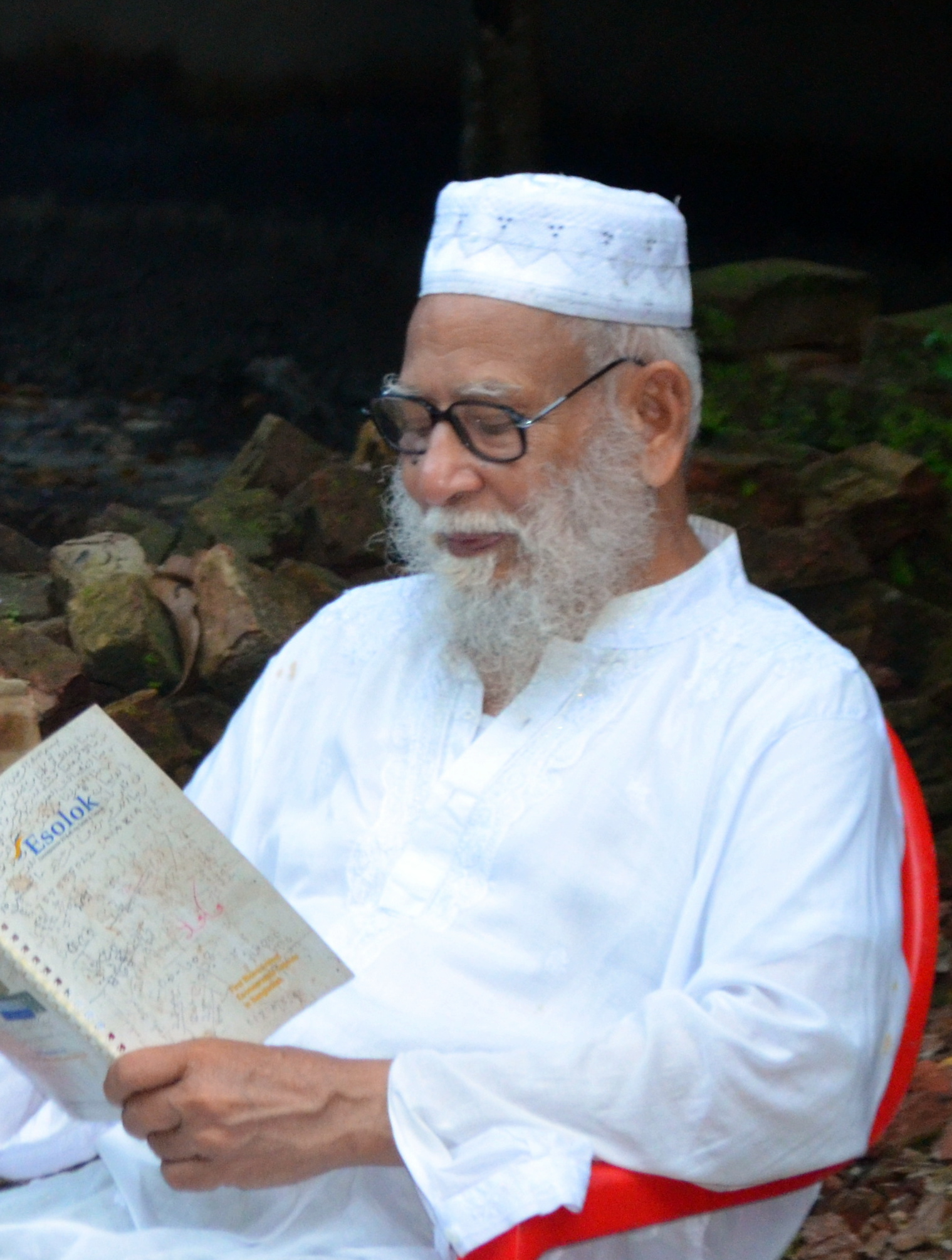

Member of Parliament for Satkhira-3
- In office 1 October 2001 – 29 October 2006
- Preceded by: S. M. Mokhlesur Rahman
- Succeeded by: AFM Ruhal Haque
- In office 20 March 1991 – 30 March 1996
- Preceded by: Salahuddin Sardar
- Succeeded by: S. M. Mokhlesur Rahman

Personal details
- Born: 1932 Satkhira
- Died: 2016 (aged 83–84)
- Party: Bangladesh Jamaat-e-Islami

AM Riasat Ali Biswas (died 2016) was a politician of the Bangladesh Jamaat-e-Islami and a member of parliament for Satkhira-3.

== Early life and education ==
Riasat Ali was born on 28 December 1937 in Kurikahunia village of Pratapnagar union in Asashuni Upazila of Satkhira district. His father's name is Mr. Ali Biswas and his mother's name is Rahila Khatun. Riasat Ali started his career as the founder principal (1958-1964) of Pratapnagar Fazil Madrasa. After serving as Principal of Ghugrakati Fazil Madrasa (1965-1968) and English Teacher of Pratapnagar High School (1968-1971) and Principal of Ghugrakati Fazil Madrasa (1973-1977) he again served as Principal of Pratapnagar Fazil Madrasa (1977-1993). Riasat was a member of Pratapnagar Union Parishad in 1958 and 1963 and served as chairman of the union from 1977 to 1983. At that time, he won the national gold medal.

== Career ==
Biswas was elected to parliament from Satkhira-3 as a candidate of Bangladesh Jamaat-e-Islami in 1991 and 2001.

== Death ==
AM Riasat Ali Biswas died on 10 March 2016.
