= M. A. Jabbar (politician, born 1940) =

Bangladeshi politician (1940–2020)

Member of Bangladesh Parliament From Satkhira-2
- In office 2008–2014
- Preceded by: Abdul Khaleque Mondal
- Succeeded by: Mir Mostaque Ahmed Robi

Personal details
- Born: 15 February 1940
- Died: 7 April 2020 (aged 80)
- Party: Jatiya Party (Ershad)

M. A. Jabbar (15 February 1940 – 7 April 2020) was a Jatiya Party (Ershad) politician and a member of parliament for Satkhira-2.

== Career ==
Jabbar was elected to parliament from Satkhira-2 as a Jatiya Party candidate in 2008. In 2015, he was sued by the Anti Corruption Commission. He died on 7 April 2020.
