= Ali Ahmad =

Ali Ahmad may refer to:

- Ali Ahmad (cricketer) (born 1995), Afghan cricketer
- Ali Ahmad (politician) (1930–1977), Malaysian politician
- Ali Ahmad, known popularly as Ali Kalora (1981–2021), Indonesian Islamic militant and leader
- Ali Ahmad (lawyer) (born 1965), Nigerian lawyer and politician

== See also ==
- Ali Ahmed (disambiguation)
