= Ali Ahmed (Bangladeshi politician) =

Bangladeshi politician

- আলী আহম্মেদ

Member of Parliament for Satkhira-3
- In office 15 February 1996 – 12 June 1996
- Preceded by: AM Riasat Ali Biswas
- Succeeded by: AM Riasat Ali Biswas

Personal details
- Born: Satkhira District
- Party: Bangladesh Nationalist Party

Ali Ahmed politician of Satkhira District of Bangladesh and former member of parliament for the Satkhira-3 constituency in February 1996.

== Career ==
Ali Ahmed was elected to parliament from Satkhira-3 as a Bangladesh Nationalist Party candidate in 15 February 1996 Bangladeshi general election. He was defeated from Satkhira-3 constituency as a candidate of Bangladesh Nationalist Party in the 7th Jatiya Sangsad elections on 12 June 1996.
