= Ulfat =

Ulfat is both feminine given name and surname of Arabic origin. Notable people with the name include:

== Given name ==
- Ulfat Ghazi, Indian nobleman and naval commander
- Ulfat Idlibi (1912–2007), Syrian novel writer
- Ulfat Ara Ayesha Khanom, Bangladeshi politician
- Ulfat Mustafin (1959–2020), Russian politician
- Ulfatmo Mamadambarova (1937–2024), Tajik-Pamiri singer
- Ulfatkhonim Mamadshoeva (born 1957), Tajik journalist and human rights activist

== Surname ==
- Gul Pacha Ulfat (1909–1977), Pashtun poet
- Shruti Ulfat, Indian actress

== See also ==
- Raaz-e-Ulfat, television show
