= Shamsul Alam Dudu =

Bangladeshi politician (born 1957)

- সামছুল আলম দুদু

Member of the Bangladesh Parliament for Joypurhat-1
- In office 2014 – 6 August 2024
- Preceded by: Mozahar Ali Prodhan
- Succeeded by: Md Fazlur Rahman Sayed

Personal details
- Born: 10 November 1957 (age 68)
- Party: Bangladesh Awami League
- Occupation: Politics, business and agriculture

Shamsul Alam Dudu (born 10 November 1957) is a Bangladesh Awami League politician and a former Jatiya Sangsad member representing the Joypurhat-1 constituency.

== Early life ==
Dudu was born on 10 November 1957. He has a B.A., M.A., and law degree.

== Career ==
Dudu was elected to Parliament on 5 January 2014 from Joypurhat-1 as an Awami League candidate. He was elected unopposed, as the election was boycotted by all opposition parties. In June 2015, he oversaw 500 workers of the Bangladesh Nationalist Party and Jamaat-e-Islami Bangladesh joining the Awami League.

Dudu developed problems with fellow Awami League member of parliament for Joypurhat-2, Abu Sayeed Al Mahmud Swapan. He received 219,825 votes while his nearest candidate, Aleya Begum, received 84,212 votes.

Dudu was reelected from Joypurhat-1 as a candidate of the Awami League. He is a member of the Parliamentary Standing Committee on the Ministry for Home Affairs. He was injured in a clash with protestors on 4 August 2024 during the non-cooperation movement.
