= Md Fazlur Rahman Sayed =

Bangladeshi politician

- মোঃ ফজলুর রহমান সাঈদ

Member of the Bangladesh Parliament for Joypurhat-1
- Incumbent
- Assumed office 17 February 2026
- Preceded by: Shamsul Alam Dudu

Personal details
- Born: 20 January 1969 (age 57) Joypurhat Sadar Upazila, Joypurhat District
- Party: Bangladesh Jamaat-e-Islami

Md Fazlur Rahman Sayed is a Bangladeshi politician of the Bangladesh Jamaat-e-Islami. He is currently serving as a member of parliament from Joypurhat-1.

== Early life ==
Sayed was born on 1 January 1969 in Joypurhat Sadar Upazila in Joypurhat District.
