= S. M. Mokhlesur Rahman =

Bangladeshi politician

Member of Bangladesh Parliament
- In office 1996–2001
- Preceded by: AM Riasat Ali Biswas
- Succeeded by: AM Riasat Ali Biswas

Personal details
- Party: Bangladesh Awami League

S. M. Mokhlesur Rahman is a Bangladesh Awami League politician and a former member of parliament for Satkhira-3.

== Career ==
Rahman was elected to parliament from Satkhira-3 as a Bangladesh Awami League candidate in 1996.
