= North Bengal Province =

North Bengal Province উত্তরবঙ্গ প্রদেশ Rajshahi Province
- Proposed province
- Proposed provincial boundaries by timeline
- Coordinates: 25.4°N 89.1°E
- Country: Bangladesh
- Before was: Divisions of Bangladesh
- Capital and largest city: Rajshahi
- Administrative Divisions: 2: Rajshahi; Rangpur

Government
  - Type: Self-governing province subject to the federal government
  - Body: North Bengal Provincial Assembly

Area
  - Total: 34,359.39 km^{2} (13,266.23 sq mi)

Population (2022 census)
  - Total: 37,964,072
  - Density: 1,104.911/km^{2} (2,861.707/sq mi)
- Demonym: Uttarbangi
- Time zone: UTC+06:00 (BST)
- Official languages: Bengali; English

North Bengal Province (Bengali: উত্তরবঙ্গ প্রদেশ, Urdu: شمالی بنگال صوبہ) was a proposed province in Pakistan in 1968 and later in Bangladesh in 1972 and 2010. During the Six point movement for East Pakistan's autonomy in 1968, the non-Bengali Muhajir community initiated a movement to establish the proposed province, known as the Muhajirland Movement. In 1969, the movement's activists proposed creating a separate province consisting of predominantly Muhajir inhabited districts of East Pakistan's North Bengal. Right-wing political parties supported the North Bengal Province movement to undermine the Six point movement.

The activists issued a declaration highlighting the risks of declaring North Bengal a province before its development and presented a list of 20 demands. In 1970, Yahya Khan, president of Pakistan, rejected the proposal for a new province. After the independence of East Pakistan as Bangladesh in 1972, cabinet member Mafiz Ali Chowdhury proposed forming Padma Province with the region of North Bengal. In 2010, Hussain Muhammad Ershad, founder and chairman of the Jatiya Party, included a proposal for North Bengal Province comprising the Rangpur Division in his plan for a provincial system. His party also incorporated the plan to establish the province in their 2018 election manifesto.

== Background ==
In 1947, when Pakistan gained independence as the Dominion of Pakistan, the partition of British India's Bengal Province took place, and the Muslim-majority region of East Bengal, later known as East Pakistan, became a part of Pakistan. During this time, Muslim refugees from India (Muhajir), primarily from the Bihar Province, took refuge in East Bengal. According to a survey conducted in the 1960s, their population in East Pakistan was 2 million.

Before 2010, the districts of Rangpur Division were under Rajshahi Division.

== History ==
In 1958, rumours spread in Rajshahi that the ruling coalition of East Pakistan would support a proposal to establish a separate province comprising the districts of the Rajshahi Division. However, in 17 February, chief minister Ataur Rahman Khan, leader of the East Pakistan Provincial Assembly, dismissed the rumours, stating that the proposal was to be introduced in the Provincial Assembly as an random initiative and that the ruling coalition would not support it. Subsequently, Moslem Ali Mollah, a member of the Provincial Assembly representing the Naogaon South-East Muslim constituency, submitted a notice to the Provincial Assembly proposing the establishment of the province. In 1968, the Six point movement began in East Pakistan demanding autonomy. During this time, the non-Bengali Muhajir community launched the Muhajirland movement in the East Pakistan's North Bengal aiming for provincial implementation. From September 1969, under the leadership of S.Q. Huda, convener of the East Pakistan Muhajir Front, the North Bengal Province Movement was organized. The movement demanded the inclusion of Muhajir-dominated districts of Rangpur, Dinajpur, and Bogra (present-day Rangpur Division, Bogura District, and Joypurhat District) in the proposed province. To counter the Six point movement, right-wing political parties supported the proposal for the proposed province.

On 22 September 1969, during a press conference in Rajshahi, ASM Solomon, general secretary of the Krishak Sramik Party, suggested forming a province with East Pakistan's Khulna and Rajshahi Divisions (current Khulna Division, Barishal Division, Rajshahi Division, and Rangpur Division). As a justification, he highlighted the lack of development in Northern Bengal since the 1950s. He also proposed establishing a permanent bench of the Dacca High Court and branches of the State Bank of Pakistan and the Industrial Development Bank of Pakistan in Rajshahi.

On 12 October 1969, the movement's declaration was published, stating that declaring North Bengal a province before its development could lead to negative competition between the two provinces of the region of Eastern Pakistan, potentially obstructing autonomy for East Pakistan. The declaration included 20 demands, such as the construction of the Jamuna Bridge and the establishment of Pakistan's second capital in North Bengal. On 3 January 1970, while being in Ishwardi Airport, president Yahya Khan rejected the demand, stating that creating a new province would not solve the issues of the region. However, he agreed to establish a branch of the State Bank of Pakistan in Rajshahi.

In 1972, after the independence of East Pakistan as Bangladesh, Mafiz Ali Chowdhury, the Minister for Power, Natural Resources, and Scientific and Technical Research of the country, demanded a separate province named Padma for the development of North Bengal. In 1990, one of the leaders of the Rajshahi Province Implementation Committee, Samata Party's Muhammad Saidur Rahman, became a candidate for the upcoming presidential election. In 2010, Hussain Muhammad Ershad, founder-chairman of the Jatiya Party, proposed a provincial system in Bangladesh. His framework included 8 provinces, one of which was the North Bengal Province, centered on the Rangpur Division with Rangpur as the proposed capital. In its 2018 election manifesto, the Jatiya Party pledged to establish the North Bengal Province centered on Rangpur. In 2022, a legal notice was sent to the High Court Division proposing the formation of four provinces, including one comprising Rangpur and Rajshahi Divisions (pre-partition Rajshahi Division). Jatiya Party reiterated this commitment in its 2023 manifesto for the province. In 2025, the Public Administration Reform Commission proposed the formation of four provinces to the government. One of the proposed provinces was the pre-partition Rajshahi Division.

== Administrative divisions ==
Administrative divisions
Divisions	Districts	Headquarters
Rajshahi	1. Chapai Nawabganj; 2. Joypurhat; 3. Naogaon; 4. Natore; 5. Pabna; 6. Bogura; 7. Rajshahi; 8. Sirajganj	Rajshahi
Rangpur	1. Kurigram; 2. Gaibandha; 3. Thakurgaon; 4. Dinajpur; 5. Nilphamari; 6. Panchagarh; 7. Rangpur; 8. Lalmonirhat	Rangpur
