= Shamsuzzoha Khan =

Bangladeshi politician

- শামসুজ্জোহা খান

Member of the Bangladesh Parliament for Naogaon-2
- In office 15 February 1996 – 29 October 2006
- Preceded by: Shahiduzzaman Sarker
- Succeeded by: Shahiduzzaman Sarker

Personal details
- Party: Bangladesh Nationalist Party

Shamsuzzoha Khan is a politician of the Bangladesh Nationalist Party and was the Jatiya Sangsad member for the Naogaon-2 constituency.

== Career ==
Shamsuzzoha Khan was elected to parliament in 1996 from Naogaon-2 as a candidate of the Bangladesh Nationalist Party (BNP). He was reelected from Naogaon-2 in 2001. Following the 2004 Dhaka grenade attack on a rally of Sheikh Hasina, he blamed the Bangladesh Awami League. In 2009 he was named the joint convenor of the Naogaon District unit of the BNP.
