= AFM Ruhal Haque =

Bangladeshi politician

- আফম রুহুল হক
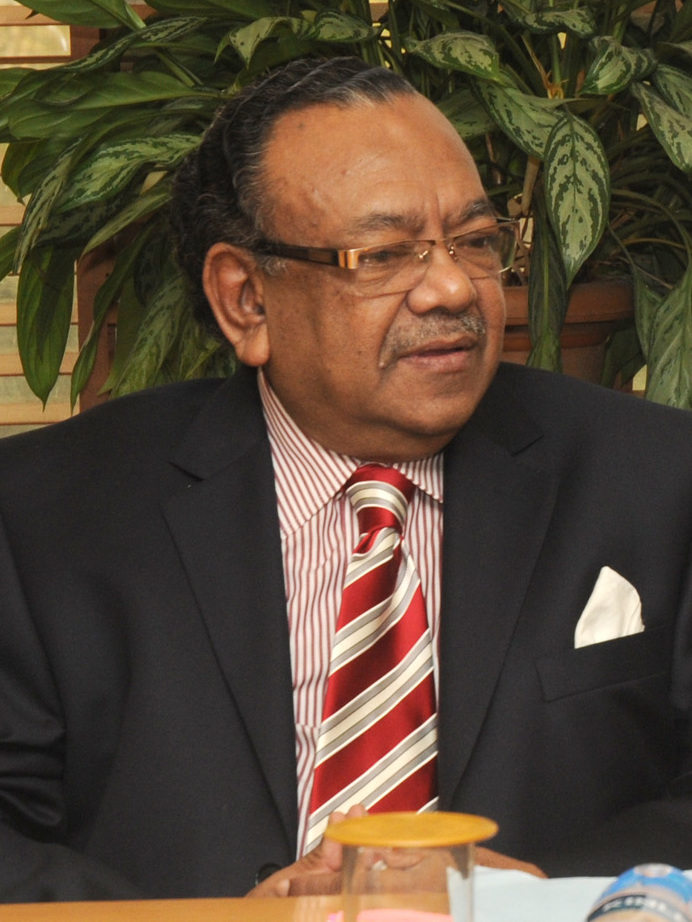
- Haque in New Delhi (2011)

Member of the Bangladesh Parliament for Satkhira-3
- In office 6 January 2009 – 6 August 2024
- Preceded by: AM Riasat Ali Biswas

Minister of Health and Family Welfare
- In office 6 January 2009 – 12 January 2014
- Preceded by: Mizanur Rahman Sinha
- Succeeded by: Mohammed Nasim

Personal details
- Born: 11 February 1944 (age 82) Satkhira District, Bengal Presidency, British India
- Party: Bangladesh Awami League

AFM Ruhal Haque (born 11 February 1944) is a Bangladesh Awami League politician and a former minister of health and family welfare. He served as a Jatiya Sangsad member representing the Satkhira-3 constituency during 2009–2024.

== Early life ==
Ruhal Haque graduated with an MBBS and worked as a doctor.

== Career ==
Haque was elected to parliament in 2008, 2014, and 2018 from Satkhira-3 as a Bangladesh Awami League candidate. He was made the president of Swadhinata Chikitshak Parishad, a pro-Awami League doctors association, by Prime Minister Sheikh Hasina. He served as the minister of health and family welfare during 2009–2014.
