= SM Nuruzzaman =

Bangladeshi politician

- এস এম নুরুজ্জামান

Member of Parliament for Naogaon-2
- In office 1988–1990
- Preceded by: Humayun Kabir Chowdhury
- Succeeded by: Shahiduzzaman Sarker

Personal details
- Born: Naogaon District
- Party: Jatiya Party

SM Nuruzzaman is a politician of Naogaon District of Bangladesh and was member of parliament for the Naogaon-2 constituency in 1988.

== Career ==
Nuruzzaman was elected to parliament from Naogaon-2 as an independent candidate in 1988.
