= Shahiduzzaman Sarker =

Bangladeshi politician

- শহীদুজ্জামান সরকার
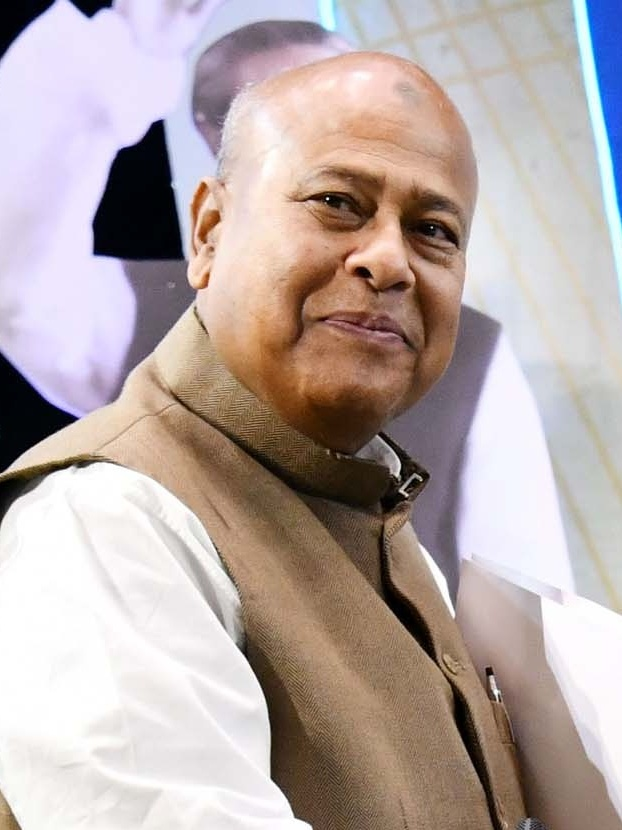
- Sarker in 2024

Minister of State for Planning
- In office 1 March 2024 – 5 August 2024
- Prime Minister: Sheikh Hasina
- Minister: Abdus Salam

Member of Parliament for Naogaon-2
- In office 25 January 2009 – 6 August 2024
- Preceded by: Shamsuzzoha Khan
- Succeeded by: Md. Enamul Haque
- In office 1991–1995
- Preceded by: SM Nuruzzaman
- Succeeded by: Shamsuzzoha Khan

Personal details
- Born: 13 December 1955 (age 70) Naogaon District, East Pakistan, Pakistan
- Party: Bangladesh Awami League
- Relations: Abbas Ali Mandal (father-in-law)

Shahiduzzaman Sarker is a Bangladesh Awami League politician and a former Jatiya Sangsad member representing Naogaon-2 constituency. He is a former Minister of State for Ministry of Planning. Sarkar previously served as the Whip of Treasury Bench of the Parliament of Bangladesh. On 1 May 2020, he became the first member of the Bangladesh Parliament to test positive for COVID-19.

== Early life ==
Sarkar was born on 13 December 1955.

== Career ==
Sarker was elected to the parliament from Naogaon-2 in 1991 as a candidate of Bangladesh Awami League. He was re-elected in 2008. He was elected unopposed in 2014 after the main opposition, Bangladesh Nationalist Party, boycotted the election. He was made the parliamentary whip on 25 January 2014.
