= Satkhira-3 =

Constituency of Bangladesh's Jatiya Sangsad

Coordinates: 22.55°N 89.18°E

- Constituency for the Jatiya Sangsad
- District: Satkhira District
- Division: Khulna Division
- Electorate: 387,337 (2018)

Current constituency
- Created: 1984
- Party: Bangladesh Jamaat-e-Islami
- Member of Parliament: Muhammad Rabiul Bassar
- ← 106 Satkhira-2 108 Satkhira-4 →

Satkhira-3 is a constituency represented in the Jatiya Sangsad (National Parliament) of Bangladesh.

== Boundaries ==
The constituency encompasses Assasuni and Kaliganj Upazilas.

== History ==
The constituency was created in 1984 from a Khulna constituency when the former Khulna District was split into three districts: Bagerhat, Khulna, and Satkhira.

Ahead of the 2008 general election, the Election Commission redrew constituency boundaries to reflect population changes revealed by the 2001 Bangladesh census. The 2008 redistricting altered the boundaries of the constituency.

Ahead of the 2026 general election, the Election Commission altered the boundaries of the constituency by removing the debhata upazilla and adding the four northernmost union parishads of Kaliganj Upazila: Bhara Simla, Champaphul, Nalta, and Tarali.

== Members of Parliament ==
Election	Member	Party
1986	Salahuddin Sardar	Independent
1988	Salahuddin Sardar	Jatiya Party
1991	AM Riasat Ali Biswas	Jamaat-e-Islami
Feb 1996	Ali Ahmed	BNP
Jun 1996	S. M. Mokhlesur Rahman	Awami League
2001	AM Riasat Ali Biswas	Jamaat-e-Islami
2008	AFM Ruhul Haque	Awami League

== Elections ==
=== Elections in the 2010s ===
AFM Ruhal Haque was re-elected unopposed in the 2014 general election after opposition parties withdrew their candidacies in a boycott of the election.

=== Elections in the 2000s ===
General Election 2008: Satkhira-3
Party	Candidate	Votes	%	±%
AL	AFM Ruhal Haque	142,709	51.0	+8.4
Jamaat	AM Riasat Ali Biswas	133,802	47.8	−7.2
IAB	Abul Khair Md. Ruhul Amin	2,903	1.0	N/A
Independent	Barun Kumar Biswas	444	0.2	N/A
Majority		8,907	3.2	−9.2
Turnout		279,858	90.5	+1.1
AL gain from Jamaat				

General Election 2001: Satkhira-3
Party	Candidate	Votes	%	±%
Jamaat	AM Riasat Ali Biswas	73,577	55.0	+32.1
AL	S. M. Mokhlesur Rahman	56,982	42.6	+3.9
IJOF	Salahuddin Sardar	3,180	2.4	N/A
Majority		16,595	12.4	+5.0
Turnout		133,739	89.4	+8.0
Jamaat gain from AL				

=== Elections in the 1990s ===
General Election June 1996: Satkhira-3
Party	Candidate	Votes	%	±%
AL	S. M. Mokhlesur Rahman	39,722	38.7	+7.6
JP(E)	Salahuddin Sardar	32,087	31.3	+8.2
Jamaat	AM Riasat Ali Biswas	23,462	22.9	−10.2
BNP	Ali Ahmed	6,459	6.3	+3.7
Independent	Md. Abdul Hadi	391	0.4	N/A
IOJ	S. M. Shahadatur Rahman	243	0.2	N/A
Jatiya Samajtantrik Dal-JSD	S. M. Saidur Rahman	140	0.1	−0.2
FP	Md. Matiar Rahman	45	0.0	N/A
Majority		7,635	7.4	+5.4
Turnout		102,549	81.4	+13.5
AL gain from Jamaat				

General Election 1991: Satkhira-3
Party	Candidate	Votes	%	±%
Jamaat	AM Riasat Ali Biswas	31,631	33.1	
AL	Md. Hafizur Rahman	29,680	31.1	
JP(E)	Salahuddin Sardar	22,095	23.1	
Independent	Md. Abul Khaer	6,524	6.8	
BNP	M. Abdul Halim	2,532	2.6	
Zaker Party	Rezaul Karim	1,570	1.6	
Independent	Md. Rafiqul Islam	690	0.7	
WPB	Rouf Uddin	308	0.3	
Jatiya Samajtantrik Dal-JSD	S. M. Saidur Rahman	246	0.3	
Independent	S. M. Ruhul Amin	232	0.2	
Bangladesh Muslim League (Kader)	Ashfaquzzaman	62	0.1	
Majority		1,951	2.0	
Turnout		95,570	67.9	
Jamaat gain from JP(E)				
