= Malti Rani =

Bangladeshi politician

Member of Bangladesh Parliament
- In office 1986–1988

Personal details
- Party: Jatiya Party (Ershad)

Malti Rani (Bengali: মালতী রানী তঞ্চংগ্যা) is a Jatiya Party (Ershad) politician and a former member of the Bangladesh Parliament from a reserved women's seat.

== Career ==
Rani was elected to parliament from a reserved women's seat as a Jatiya Party candidate in 1986.
