= Joypurhat-1 =

Constituency of Bangladesh's Jatiya Sangsad

Coordinates: 25.10°N 89.03°E

- Constituency for the Jatiya Sangsad
- District: Joypurhat District
- Division: Rajshahi Division
- Electorate: 466,274 (2026)

Current constituency
- Created: 1984
- Party: Bangladesh Jamaat-e-Islami
- Member: Md Fazlur Rahman Sayed
- ← 33 Gaibandha-5 35 Joypurhat-2 →

Joypurhat-1 is a constituency represented in the Jatiya Sangsad (National Parliament) of Bangladesh since 2026 by Md Fazlur Rahman Sayed of the Bangladesh Jamaat-e-Islami.

== Boundaries ==
The constituency encompasses Joypurhat Sadar and Panchbibi upazilas.

== History ==
The constituency was created in 1984 from a Bogra constituency when the former Bogra District was split into two districts: Bogra and Joypurhat.

== Members of Parliament ==
Election	Member	Party
1986	Abbas Ali Mandal	Awami League
1988	Khandakar Oliuzzaman Alam	Jatiya Party
1991	Golam Rabbani	Bangladesh Nationalist Party
1996	Abdul Alim	Bangladesh Nationalist Party
2008	Mozahar Ali Prodhan	Bangladesh Nationalist Party
2014	Shamsul Alam Dudu	Awami League
2026	Md Fazlur Rahman Sayed	Bangladesh Jamaat-e-Islami

== Elections ==
=== Elections in the 2020s ===
General election 2026: Joypurhat-1
Party	Candidate	Votes	%	±%
BNP	Md. Masud Rana Prodhan			
BSD	Md. Wazed Parvez			
Jamaat	Md. Fazlur Rahman Sayeed			
BSD (Marxist)	Taufiqa Dewan			
Independent	Sabiqun Nahar			
Majority				
Turnout				

=== Elections in the 2010s ===
Shamsul Alam Dudu was elected unopposed in the 2014 general election after opposition parties withdrew their candidacies in a boycott of the election.

=== Elections in the 2000s ===
General Election 2008: Joypurhat-1
Party	Candidate	Votes	%	±%
BNP	Mozahar Ali Prodhan	164,820	55.3	−8.5
AL	Khaza Samsul Alam	130,529	43.8	+11.5
IAB	Dewan Muhammad Zahurul Islam	1,193	0.4	N/A
BSD	Wazed Parvez	715	0.2	N/A
CPB	Dewan Bodiuzzaman	659	0.2	−0.1
Independent	Abdul Aziz Mollah	158	0.1	N/A
Majority		34,291	11.5	−20.0
Turnout		298,074	90.9	+5.8
BNP hold				

General Election 2001: Joypurhat-1
Party	Candidate	Votes	%	±%
BNP	Abdul Alim	159,830	63.8	+20.7
AL	Abbas Ali Mandal	80,900	32.3	+3.4
IJOF	Abul Kalam Azad	8,074	3.2	N/A
Bangladesh Samajtantrik Dal (Basad-Khalekuzzaman)	Wazed Parvez	853	0.3	N/A
CPB	Dewan Bodiuzzaman	677	0.3	+0.2
JSD	Jalilur Rahman Jillu	180	0.1	N/A
Majority		78,930	31.5	+17.3
Turnout		250,514	85.1	+1.5
BNP hold				

=== Elections in the 1990s ===
General Election June 1996: Joypurhat-1
Party	Candidate	Votes	%	±%
BNP	Abdul Alim	90,713	43.1	+12.1
AL	Abbas Ali Mandal	60,768	28.9	−2.0
Jamaat	Md. Abbas Ali Khan	37,713	17.9	−9.9
JP(E)	Md. Abdul Hakim Mondol	20,415	9.7	+8.7
CPB	Md. Badruzzaman	302	0.1	−1.1
Bangladesh Samajtantrik Dal (Khalekuzzaman)	Wazed Parvez	277	0.1	N/A
Zaker Party	Md. Bulbul Chowdhury	212	0.1	−0.1
Majority		29,945	14.2	+14.1
Turnout		210,400	83.6	+16.9
BNP hold				

General Election 1991: Joypurhat-1
Party	Candidate	Votes	%	±%
BNP	Golam Rabbani	48,167	31.0	
AL	Abbas Ali Mandal	48,091	30.9	
Jamaat	Abbas Ali Khan	43,308	27.8	
Jatiya Oikkya Front	Abdul Alim	10,907	7.0	
CPB	Md. Aminul Haque	1,892	1.2	
JP(E)	Khandakar Oliuzzaman Alam	1,592	1.0	
Islami Samajtantrik Dal	Md. Moksedur Rahman	606	0.4	
IOJ	Md. Mukim Uddin	439	0.3	
Zaker Party	Md. Bulbul Chowdhury	345	0.2	
Bangladesh Muslim League (Kader)	Md. Zaibar Ali Akand	171	0.1	
Majority		76	0.0	
Turnout		155,518	66.7	
BNP gain from JP(E)				
