= Golam Rabbani (Joypurhat politician) =

Bangladeshi politician

Member of Parliament for Joypurhat-1
- In office 5 March 1991 – 24 November 1995
- Preceded by: Khandakar Oliuzzaman Alam
- Succeeded by: Abdul Alim

Personal details
- Died: 10 January 2011 (aged 57) Dinajpur District, Bangladesh
- Party: Bangladesh Nationalist Party

Golam Rabbani (died 10 January 2011) was a Bangladeshi politician who served as a Jatiya Sangsad member representing the Joypurhat-1 constituency.
