= Humayun Kabir Chowdhury =

Bangladeshi politician

Member of Bangladesh Parliament
- In office 1986–1988
- Succeeded by: SM Nuruzzaman

Personal details
- Party: Jatiya Party (Ershad)

Humayun Kabir Chowdhury is a Jatiya Party (Ershad) politician and a former member of parliament for Naogaon-2.

== Career ==
Chowdhury was elected to parliament from Naogaon-2 as a Jatiya Party candidate in 1986.
