= Mozahar Ali Prodhan =

Bangladeshi politician (1952–2018)

- মোজাহার আলী প্রধান

Member of Parliament for Joypurhat-1
- In office 25 January 2009 – 24 January 2014
- Preceded by: Abdul Alim
- Succeeded by: Shamsul Alam Dudu

Personal details
- Born: 31 March 1952 Joypurhat
- Died: 5 January 2018 (aged 69) Dinajpur, Bangladesh
- Party: Bangladesh Nationalist Party

Mozahar Ali Prodhan (31 March 1952-5 January 2018) was a Bangladesh Nationalist Party politician and a Jatiya Sangsad member from the Joypurhat-1 constituency.

== Career ==
Prodhan was elected to parliament from Joypurhat-1 in 2008 as a Bangladesh Nationalist Party Candidate. He also served as the president of Joypurhat District unit of Bangladesh Nationalist Party. On 8 October 2010, a legal notice to terminated his membership in parliament was filed on the basis that he gave false information to the election commission.

== Death ==
Prodhan died on 5 January 2018.
