= Syeda Begum Noor Maqsood =

Bangladeshi politician

Member of Bangladesh Parliament
- In office 1986–1988

Personal details
- Party: Jatiya Party (Ershad)

Syeda Begum Noor Maqsood (Bengali: সৈয়দা নুরে মাকসুদ) is a Jatiya Party (Ershad) politician and a former member of the Bangladesh Parliament from a reserved women's seat.

== Career ==
Maqsood was elected to parliament from a reserved women's seat as a Jatiya Party candidate in 1986.
