= Satkhira-2 =

Constituency of Bangladesh's Jatiya Sangsad

Coordinates: 22.72°N 89.07°E

- Constituency for the Jatiya Sangsad
- District: Satkhira District
- Division: Khulna Division
- Electorate: 356,246 (2018)

Current constituency
- Created: 1984
- Party: Bangladesh Jamaat-e-Islami
- Member of Parliament: Muhammad Abdul Khaliq
- ← 105 Satkhira-1 107 Satkhira-3 →

Satkhira-2 is a constituency represented in the Jatiya Sangsad (National Parliament) of Bangladesh.

== Boundaries ==
The constituency encompasses Satkhira Sadar and Debhata upazila.

== History ==
The constituency was created in 1984 from the Khulna-14 constituency when the former Khulna District was split into three districts: Bagerhat, Khulna, and Satkhira.

In the 2018 general election, the constituency was one of six chosen by lottery to use electronic voting machines.

Ahead of the 2026 general election, the Election Commission decided to expand the boundaries of the constituency to include Debhata upazila.

== Members of Parliament ==
Election	Member	Party
1986	Kazi Shamsur Rahman	Jamaat-e-Islami
1988	Md. Habibur Rahman	Jatiya Party
1991	Kazi Shamsur Rahman	Jamaat-e-Islami
Feb 1996	Shamsul Haque	BNP
Jun 1996	Kazi Shamsur Rahman	Jamaat-e-Islami
2001	Abdul Khaleque Mondal	Jamaat-e-Islami
2008	M. A. Jabbar	Jatiya Party
2014	Mir Mostaque Ahmed Robi	Awami League
2024	Ashrafuzzaman Ashu	Jatiya Party
2026	Muhammad Abdul Khaleq	Bangladesh Jamaat-e-Islami

== Elections ==
=== Elections in the 2010s ===
General Election 2014: Satkhira-2
Party	Candidate	Votes	%	±%
AL	Mir Mostaque Ahmed Robi	32,859	65.4	N/A
Independent	Saiful Karim Sabu	15,789	31.4	N/A
NAP	Kazi Sayedur Rahman	981	2.0	N/A
Jatiya Party (M)	Md. Mohsin Hossain	645	1.3	+0.6
Majority		17,070	34.0	+26.5
Turnout		50,274	16.0	−74.0
AL gain from JP(E)				

=== Elections in the 2000s ===
General Election 2008: Satkhira-2
Party	Candidate	Votes	%	±%
JP(E)	M. A. Jabbar	133,422	53.1	N/A
Jamaat	Abdul Khaleque Mondal	114,557	45.6	−14.4
Jatiya Party (M)	Md. Habibur Rahman	1,725	0.7	N/A
IAB	Md. Mostofa Shamsuzzaman	1,216	0.5	N/A
BSD	Nithanondo Sarkar	381	0.2	N/A
Majority		18,865	7.5	−18.7
Turnout		251,301	90.0	+3.1
JP(E) gain from Jamaat				

General Election 2001: Satkhira-2
Party	Candidate	Votes	%	±%
Jamaat	Abdul Khaleque Mondal	124,206	60.0	+28.1
AL	Md. Nazrul Islam	69,861	33.7	+6.9
IJOF	Syeda Razia Fayez	12,636	6.1	N/A
Independent	Md. Saifullah Sarder	209	0.1	N/A
Independent	M. A. Jabbar	194	0.1	N/A
Majority		54,345	26.2	+26.0
Turnout		207,106	86.9	+1.0
Jamaat hold				

=== Elections in the 1990s ===
General Election June 1996: Satkhira-2
Party	Candidate	Votes	%	±%
Jamaat	Kazi Shamsur Rahman	54,096	31.9	−6.7
JP(E)	Syeda Razia Fayez	53,787	31.8	+12.3
AL	Md. Nazrul Islam	45,450	26.8	+0.7
BNP	M. Monsur Ali	14,682	8.7	−6.5
IOJ	Md. Nazrul Islam	638	0.4	N/A
Zaker Party	Kazi Sirajul Haque	368	0.2	N/A
NAP	Kazi Saidur Rahman	282	0.2	N/A
FP	A. B. M. Sadrul Ullah	52	0.0	N/A
Majority		309	0.2	−12.3
Turnout		169,355	85.9	+16.6
Jamaat hold				

General Election 1991: Satkhira-2
Party	Candidate	Votes	%	±%
Jamaat	Kazi Shamsur Rahman	45,546	38.6	
AL	A. F. M. Entaj Ali	30,767	26.1	
JP(E)	Md. Habibur Rahman	23,001	19.5	
BNP	Farida Rahman	17,883	15.2	
JSD	Kazi Riaz Uddin	471	0.4	
Bangladesh Muslim League (Kader)	M. Alauddin Molla	169	0.1	
Jatiya Samajtantrik Dal-JSD	A. K. M. Abdur Rahim	114	0.1	
Majority		14,779	12.5	
Turnout		117,951	69.3	
Jamaat gain from JP(E)				
