= Ashrafuzzaman Ashu =

Bangladeshi politician

Member of the Bangladesh Parliament for Satkhira-2
- In office 10 January 2024 – 6 August 2024
- Preceded by: Mir Mostaque Ahmed Robi

Personal details
- Born: 1 January 1957 (age 69) Satkhira, East Pakistan, Pakistan
- Party: Jatiya Party (Ershad)
- Occupation: Politician

Ashrafuzzaman Ashu is a Bangladeshi politician and a former Jatiya Sangsad member representing the Satkhira-2 constituency served in 2024.
