= Abbas Ali Mandal =

Bangladeshi politician (died 2022)

- আব্বাস আলী মন্ডল

Member of Bangladesh Parliament
- In office 1986–1988
- Succeeded by: Khandakar Oliuzzaman Alam

Personal details
- Died: 26 July 2022 Dhaka, Bangladesh
- Party: Bangladesh Awami League
- Relations: Shahiduzzaman Sarker (son-in-law)

Abbas Ali Mandal (died 26 July 2022) was a Bangladesh Awami League politician who was member of parliament for Joypurhat-1.

He died on 26 July 2022 in Shaheed Suhrawardy Medical College & Hospital, Dhaka.

== Career ==
Mandal was elected to parliament from Joypurhat-1 as a Bangladesh Awami League candidate in 1986.
