= Mafiz Ali Chowdhury =

Bangladeshi politician

Member of Parliament
- In office 1973–1976
- Succeeded by: Abdul Alim

Personal details
- Born: 1919 Mongalbari, Joypurhat District, East Bengal, British Raj
- Died: 30 May 1994 (aged 74–75)
- Party: Bangladesh Awami League

Mafiz Ali Chowdhury (1919–1994) was a Bangladeshi politician who was part of the Bangladesh Awami League and a former Minister and Member of Parliament.

== Early life ==
Chowdhury was born in 1919 in Mongalbari, Joypurhat District, East Bengal, British Raj. He graduated from Kolkata Presidency College with a Bachelor of Science and completed his Master of Science in 1937 from the University of Dhaka. In 1949, he completed his Doctor of Philosophy from Lehigh University. He was a member of the London-based Royal Society of Chemistry.

== Career ==
Chowdhury became involved with politics while still a student, joining the All India Muslim Chhatra Samity (All India Muslim Student Association). He was elected to the working committee of the All India Muslim Chhatra Samity. He campaigned for the removal of the Holwell Monument. He joined the Awami League in 1963 and participated in the 1966 Six point movement of the league. He edited the journal Swadesh during the 1960s. He took part in the mass uprisings of 1969 in East Pakistan.

In 1970, he was elected to the Pakistan National Assembly from Bogra-1 as a candidate of Awami League. He led the non-cooperation movement in Bogra in 1971. He was in the Bangladeshi delegation to the United Nations led by Justice Abu Sayeed Chowdhury in 1971. After the independence of Bangladesh, he was included in the 1972 cabinet of Sheikh Mujibur Rahman. He was elected to the Parliament of Bangladesh in 1973 from Bogra-1 as a candidate of the Bangladesh Awami League. He was made the Minister of Natural Wealth, Science and Technology Research and Atomic Energy in 1973. He was the Deputy Leader of the Bangladeshi delegation to the United Nations General Assembly in 1975.

== Death ==
Chowdhury died on 30 May 1994.
