= Naogaon-2 =

Constituency of Bangladesh's Jatiya Sangsad

Coordinates: 25.05°N 88.76°E

- Constituency for the Jatiya Sangsad
- District: Naogaon District
- Division: Rajshahi Division
- Electorate: 322,091 (2018)

Current constituency
- Created: 1984
- Party: Bangladesh Jamaat-e-Islami
- Member: Md. Enamul Haque
- ← 46 Naogaon-1 48 Naogaon-3 →

Naogaon-2 is a constituency represented in the Jatiya Sangsad (National Parliament) of Bangladesh since 2026 by Md. Enamul Haque of the Bangladesh Jamaat-e-Islami.

== Boundaries ==
The constituency encompasses Dhamoirhat and Patnitala upazilas.

== History ==
The constituency was created in 1984 from a Rajshahi constituency when the former Rajshahi District was split into four districts: Nawabganj, Naogaon, Rajshahi, and Natore.

== Members of Parliament ==
Election	Member	Party
1986	Humayun Kabir Chowdhury	Jatiya Party
1988	SM Nuruzzaman	Combined Opposition Party
1991	Shahiduzzaman Sarker	Awami League
1996	Shamsuzzoha Khan	Bangladesh Nationalist Party
2001	Shamsuzzoha Khan	Bangladesh Nationalist Party
2008	Shahiduzzaman Sarker	Awami League
2026	Md. Enamul Haque	Bangladesh Jamaat-e-Islami

== Elections ==
=== Elections in the 2010s ===
Shahiduzzaman Sarker was re-elected unopposed in the 2014 general election after opposition parties withdrew their candidacies in a boycott of the election.

=== Elections in the 2000s ===
General Election 2008: Naogaon-2
Party	Candidate	Votes	%	±%
AL	Shahiduzzaman Sarker	149,480	60.0	+20.6
BNP	Shamsuzzoha Khan	97,732	39.3	−15.5
BDB	Abdur Rouf Mannan	1,774	0.7	N/A
Majority		51,748	20.8	+9.4
Turnout		248,986	94.4	+5.3
AL gain from BNP				

General Election 2001: Naogaon-2
Party	Candidate	Votes	%	±%
BNP	Shamsuzzoha Khan	112,827	54.8	+15.7
AL	Shahiduzzaman Sarkar	89,377	43.4	+8.9
IJOF	Humyun Kabir Chowdhury	3,209	1.6	N/A
SKSD	Sirajul Islam	391	0.2	0.0
Majority		23,450	11.4	+6.8
Turnout		205,804	89.1	+5.5
BNP hold				

=== Elections in the 1990s ===
General Election June 1996: Naogaon-2
Party	Candidate	Votes	%	±%
BNP	Shamsuzzoha Khan	62,590	39.1	+5.0
AL	Shahiduzzaman Sarkar	55,199	34.5	−5.3
Jamaat	Md. Moin Uddin	23,790	14.9	−8.8
JP(E)	Azizur Rahman	17,170	10.7	+10.1
Zaker Party	Md. Morsedul Arefin	657	0.4	−0.4
SKSD	Sirajul Islam	288	0.2	N/A
Jatiya Samajtantrik Dal-JSD	Md. Abdul Hakim	191	0.1	−0.2
Independent	Md. Suzauddula	69	0.0	N/A
Majority		7,391	4.6	−1.0
Turnout		159,954	83.6	+13.4
BNP gain from AL				

General Election 1991: Naogaon-2
Party	Candidate	Votes	%	±%
AL	Shahiduzzaman Sarker	51,317	39.8	
BNP	Abdur Rauf Mannan	44,040	34.1	
Jamaat	Md. Maolana Aman Ullah	30,637	23.7	
Zaker Party	Md. Khorshedul Arifin	963	0.8	
JP(E)	Humayun Kabir Chowdhury	816	0.6	
FP	Md. Mojibar Rahman	669	0.5	
Jatiya Samajtantrik Dal-JSD	Md. Abdus Samad	408	0.3	
Bangladesh Muslim League (Aian Uddin)	Md. Sadekur Rahman	217	0.2	
Majority		7,277	5.6	
Turnout		129,067	70.2	
AL gain from				
