= Salahuddin Sardar =

Bangladeshi politician

Member of Bangladesh Parliament

Personal details
- Party: Jatiya Party (Ershad)

Salahuddin Sardar is a Bangladeshi Jatiya Party (Ershad) politician and a former member of parliament for Satkhira-3.

== Career ==
Sardar was elected to parliament from Satkhira-3 as a Jatiya Party candidate in 1986 and 1988.
