= Ulfat Ara Ayesha Khanom =

Bangladeshi politician

- উলফত আরা আয়শা খানম
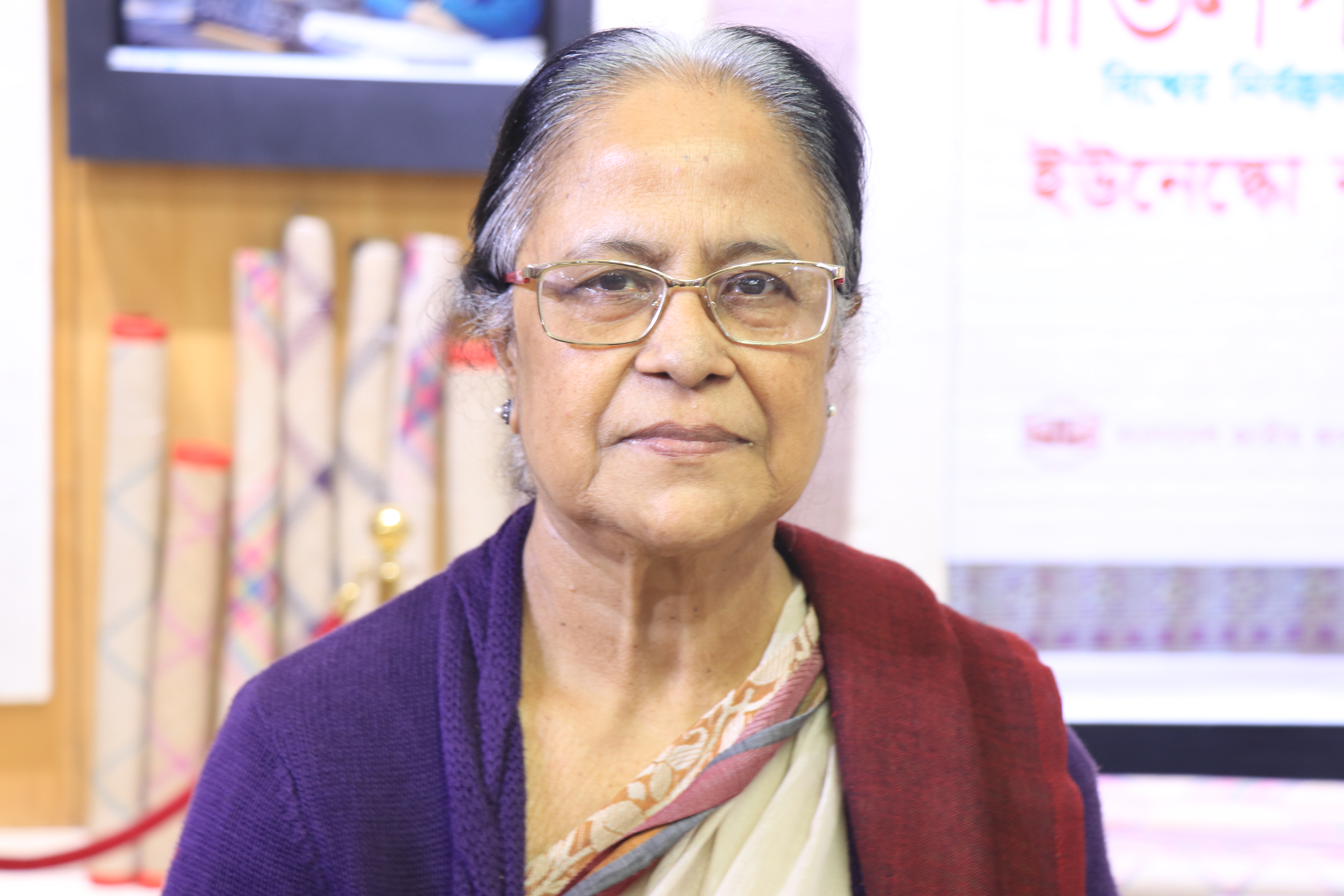
- Khanom in 2018

Member of Bangladesh Parliament
- In office 1986–1988

Personal details
- Party: Jatiya Party (Ershad)

Ulfat Ara Ayesha Khanom is a Jatiya Party (Ershad) politician and a former member of the Bangladesh Parliament from a reserved women's seat.

== Career ==
Khanom was elected to parliament from a reserved women's seat as a Jatiya Party candidate in 1986.
