= Anwara Begum (politician) =

Bangladeshi politician (died 2019)

- আনোয়ারা বেগম

Member of 3rd Jatiya Sangsad of Reserved Seats for Women
- In office 10 July 1986 – 6 December 1987

Personal details
- Born: 1948/49
- Died: 4 August 2019 (aged 70)
- Party: Jatiya Party (Kazi Zafor)
- Spouse: Abdur Rashid
- Occupation: Politician

Anwara Begum (1948/1949 – 4 August 2019) was a Bangladeshi politician who was elected as a member of the 3rd Jatiya Sangsad of reserved seats for women. She joined the Jatiya Party (Kazi Zafor) from the Jatiya Party of Hussain Muhammad Ershad in 2013. She was appointed a presidium member of the Jatiya Party (Kazi Zafor).

Begum died on 4 August 2019 at the age of 70.
