= Kazi Shamsur Rahman =

Bangladesh Jamaat-e-Islami politician

Member of Bangladesh Parliament

Personal details
- Died: February 17, 2006
- Party: Bangladesh Jamaat-e-Islami

Kazi Shamsur Rahman was a Bangladesh Jamaat-e-Islami politician and a former member of parliament for Satkhira-2.

== Career ==
Kazi Shamsur Rahman served as the head teacher of Satkhira Labsa Junior High School, Satani Bhadra High School, Kaliganj Pilot High School, Satkhira Night High School and Satkhira Palli Mangal High School from 1961-1970. He was a member of the central working council of Bangladesh Jamaat-e-Islami. Rahman was elected to parliament from Satkhira-2 as a Bangladesh Jamaat-e-Islami candidate in 1986 and 1991. Kazi Shamsur Rahman died on 17 February 2006
