= List of members of the 4th Jatiya Sangsad =

4th Jatiya Sangsad
←	3rd Sangsad	5th Sangsad	→
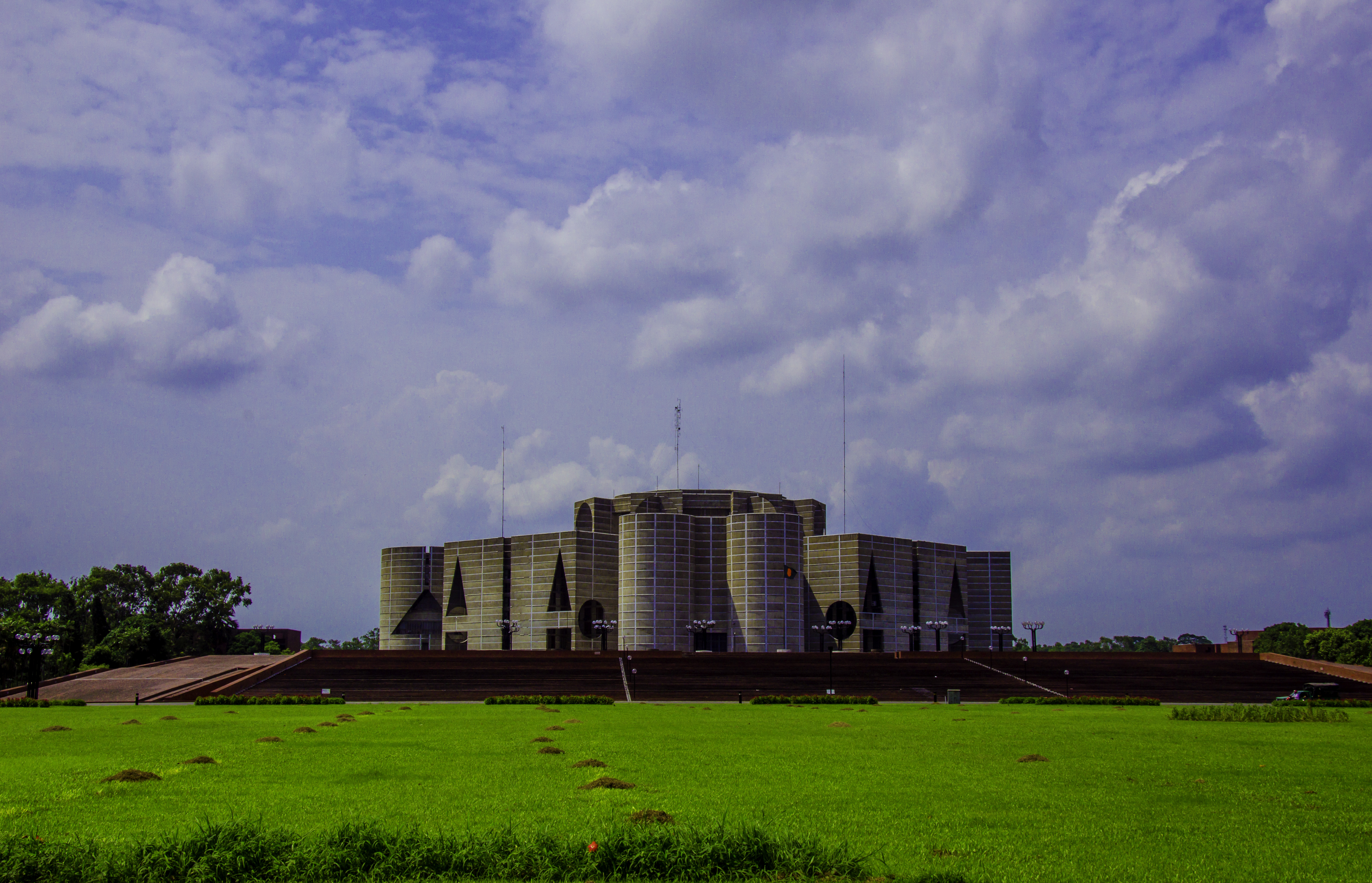

Overview
- Legislative body: Parliament of the Bangladesh
- Jurisdiction: Bangladesh
- Term: 3 March 1988 – 6 December 1990
- Election: 1988 Bangladeshi general election

Jatiya Sangsad
- Members: 300

This is a list of members of parliament (MPs) elected to the 4th Parliament of the Jatiya Sangsad, the National Parliament of Bangladesh, by Bangladeshi constituencies. The list includes both MPs elected at the 1988 general election, held on 3 March 1988, and nominated women's members for reserved seats and those subsequently elected in by-elections.

== Members ==
=== Elected members of parliament ===
No	Constituency	Name	Party	Notes
1	Panchagarh-1	Abdul Kuddus	Jatiya Party	
2	Panchagarh-2	Md. Kamiz Uddin	Jatiya Party	
3	Thakurgaon-1	Rezwanul Haque Idu Chowdhury	Jatiya Party	
4	Thakurgaon-2	Mirza Ruhul Amin	Combined opposition	
5	Thakurgaon-3	Hafiz Uddin Ahmed	Jatiya Party	
6	Dinajpur-1	Anisul Haque Chowdhury	Combined opposition	
7	Dinajpur-2	Reazul Huq Chowdhury	Combined opposition	
8	Dinajpur-3	Mokhlesur Rahman	Jatiya Party	
9	Dinajpur-4	Mohammed Sakhawat Rahman	Combined opposition	
10	Dinajpur-5	Mohammad Shoaib	Combined opposition	
11	Dinajpur-6	Abdus Sattar Chowdhury	Combined opposition	
12	Nilphamari-1	Begum Mansur Mohiuddin	Jatiya Party	
13	Nilphamari-2	Dewan Nurunnabi	Jatiya Party	
14	Nilphamari-3	MK Alam Chowdhury	Jatiya Party	
15	Nilphamari-4	Kazi Faruque Kader	Jatiya Party	
16	Lalmonirhat-1	Joynal Abedin Sarker	Jatiya Party	
17	Lalmonirhat-2	Mojibur Rahman	Jatiya Party	
18	Lalmonirhat-3	Md. Riaz Uddin Ahmed	Combined opposition	
19	Rangpur-1	Moyezuddin Sarker	Jatiya Party	
20	Rangpur-2	Mohammad Kamal Uddin Haider	Combined opposition	
21	Rangpur-3	Mofazzal Hossain	Jatiya Party	
22	Rangpur-4	Shah Alam	Jatiya Party	
23	Rangpur-5	Mohammad Harij Uddin Sarker	Combined opposition	
24	Rangpur-6	Abdul Jalil Pradhan	Jatiya Party	
25	Kurigram-1	A.K.M. Shahidul Islam	Jatiya Party	
26	Kurigram-2	Md. Tajul Islam Choudhury	Jatiya Party	
27	Kurigram-3	AKM Maidul Islam	Jatiya Party	
28	Kurigram-4	Najimuddaula	Jatiya Party	
28	Kurigram-4	Rokanuddaula Mandal	Jatiya Party	1988 by-election
29	Gaibandha-1	Hafizur Rahman Pramanik	Jatiya Party	
30	Gaibandha-2	Asghar Ali Khan	Combined opposition	
31	Gaibandha-3	TIM Fazle Rabbi Chowdhury	Jatiya Party	
32	Gaibandha-4	Ataur Rahman	Combined opposition	
33	Gaibandha-5	Fazle Rabbi Miah	Jatiya Party	
34	Joypurhat-1	Khandakar Oliuzzaman Alam	Jatiya Party	
35	Joypurhat-2	Kazi Rabbi Hasan	Jatiya Party	
36	Bogra-1	Mohammad Abdul Momin Mandal	Jatiya Party	
37	Bogra-2	Syed Maskarul Alam Chowdhury	Combined opposition	
38	Bogra-3	ABM Shahjahan	Jatiya Party	
39	Bogra-4	Mamdudur Rahman Chowdhury	Jatiya Party	
40	Bogra-5	Md. Shahjahan Ali Talukder	Combined opposition	
41	Bogra-6	Saifur Rahman Bhandari	Combined opposition	
42	Bogra-7	Aminul Islam Sarker	Jatiya Party	
43	Nawabgonj-1	Mahbubul Alam	Combined opposition	
44	Nawabgonj-2	Salah Uddin Ahmed	Combined opposition	
45	Nawabgonj-3	Ehsan Ali Khan	Jatiya Party	
46	Naogaon-1	AKM Fazlul Haque	Combined opposition	
47	Naogaon-2	SM Nuruzzaman	Combined opposition	
48	Naogaon-3	Md. Suzauddaulah	Jatiya Party	
49	Naogaon-4	Kafil Uddin Sonar	Jatiya Party	
50	Naogaon-5	Abdul Hai	Combined opposition	
51	Naogaon-6	Mullah Rezaul Islam	Combined opposition	
52	Rajshahi-1	Durul Huda	Combined opposition	
53	Rajshahi-2	Mesbah Uddin Ahmed	Jatiya Party	
54	Rajshahi-3	Sardar Amjad Hossain	Jatiya Party	
55	Rajshahi-4	Abul Hossain	Jatiya Party	
56	Rajshahi-5	Mohammad Nurun Nabi Chand	Combined opposition	
57	Natore-1	Md. Naosher Ali Sarkar	Jatiya Party	
58	Natore-2	Mohammad Mujibur Rahman	Jatiya Party	
59	Natore-3	Yakub Ali	Jatiya Party	
60	Natore-4	Md. Abul Kasem Sarker	Jatiya Party	
61	Sirajganj-1	Shafiqul Islam	Combined opposition	
62	Sirajganj-2	Iqbal Hassan Mahmood	Jatiya Party	
63	Sirajganj-3	Ataur Rahman	Combined opposition	
64	Sirajganj-4	Abdul Hamid Talukder	Jatiya Party	
65	Sirajganj-5	Shahidul Islam Khan	Jatiya Party	
66	Sirajganj-6	Nurul Islam Talukder	Jatiya Party	
67	Sirajganj-7	M.A. Matin	Jatiya Party	
68	Pabna-1	Manzur Quader	Jatiya Party	
69	Pabna-2	Mokbul Hossain	Jatiya Party	
70	Pabna-3	AKM Shamsuddin	Jatiya Party	
71	Pabna-4	Manjur Rahman Biswas	Jatiya Party	
72	Pabna-5	Md. Iqbal	Jatiya Party	
73	Meherpur-1	Ramjan Ali	Jatiya Party	
74	Meherpur-2	Bazlul Huda	Combined opposition	
75	Kushtia-1	Mohammad Korban Ali	Jatiya Party	
76	Kushtia-2	Ahsan Habib Lincoln	Jatiya Party	
77	Kushtia-3	Mohammad Badruddoza	Combined opposition	
78	Kushtia-4	Nur Alam Ziku	Jatiya Samajtantrik Dal-JSD	
79	Chuadanga-1	Mohammad Shahjahan	Combined opposition	
80	Chuadanga-2	Habibur Rahman	Jatiya Party	
81	Jhenidah-1	Muhammad Dabiruddin Joardar	Jatiya Party	
82	Jhenidah-2	Ashraful Abedin	Jatiya Party	
83	Jhenidah-3	Shamsul Huda Khan	Combined opposition	
84	Jhenidah-4	Noor Uddin	Combined opposition	
85	Jessore-1	K. M. Nazrul Islam	Jatiya Party	
86	Jessore-2	Mir Shahadatur Rahman	Combined opposition	
87	Jessore-3	Abdul Hai	Jatio Shomajtantrik Dal	
88	Jessore-4	M. Nazim Uddin Al Azad	Combined opposition	
89	Jessore-5	Muhammad Wakkas	Jatiya Party	
90	Jessore-6	Abdul Kader	Combined opposition	
91	Magura-1	M. A. Matin	Jatiya Party	
92	Magura-2	Nitai Roy Chowdhury	Jatiya Party	
93	Narail-1	SM Abu Sayeed	Jatiya Party	
94	Narail-2	Saif Hafizur Rahman	Jatiya Party	
95	Bagerhat-1	Sheikh Abdul Hye Bachchu	Jatiya Party	
96	Bagerhat-2	Sheikh Sahidul Islam	Jatiya Party	
97	Bagerhat-3	Aftab Uddin Howlader	Jatiya Party	
98	Bagerhat-4	Mia Abbas Uddin	Combined opposition	
99	Khulna-1	Sheikh Abul Hossain	Jatiya Party	
100	Khulna-2	Mia Musa Hossain	Jatiya Party	
101	Khulna-3	Abdul Gaffar Biswas	Jatiya Party	
102	Khulna-4	Moktar Hossain	Combined opposition	
103	Khulna-5	HMA Gaffar	Jatiya Party	
104	Khulna-6	Jahurul Haque Sardar	Jatiya Party	
105	Shatkhira-1	Syed Didar Bakht	Jatiya Party	
106	Shatkhira-2	Md. Habibur Rahman	Jatiya Party	
107	Shatkhira-3	Salahuddin Sardar	Jatiya Party	
108	Shatkhira-4	M. Mansur Ali	Jatiya Party	
109	Shatkhira-5	Sheikh Abul Hossain	Jatiya Party	
110	Barguna-1	Zafrul Hasan Farhad	Combined opposition	
111	Barguna-2	Nurul Islam Moni	Combined opposition	
112	Barguna-3	Motiur Rahman Talukdar	Jatiya Party	
113	Patuakhali-1	Sardar Abdur Rashid	Jatiya Party	
114	Patuakhali-2	Md. Ruhul Amin	Jatiya Party	
115	Patuakhali-3	Mohammad Yakub Ali Chowdhury	Jatiya Party	
116	Patuakhali-4	Abdur Razzak Khan	Jatiya Party	
117	Bhola-1	Naziur Rahman Manzur	Jatiya Party	
118	Bhola-2	Siddiqur Rahman	Combined opposition	
119	Bhola-3	Hafizuddin Ahmed	Jatiya Party	
120	Bhola-4	Saad Zagulul Faruk	Jatiya Party	
121	Barisal-1	Sunil Kumar Gupta	Jatiya Party	
122	Barisal-2	Syed Azizul Haque	Jatiya Party	
123	Barisal-3	Mohammad Abdul Barek	Jatiya Party	
124	Barisal-4	Maidul Islam	Jatiya Party	
125	Barisal-5	M. Matiur Rahman	Jatiya Party	
126	Barisal-6	ABM Ruhul Amin Howlader	Jatiya Party	
127	Jhalakathi-1	Jahangir Kabir	Jatiya Party	
128	Jhalakathi-2	Zulfiker Ali Bhutto	Jatiya Party	
129	Pirojpur-1	Mostafa Jamal Haider	Jatiya Party	
130	Pirojpur-2	Anwar Hossain Manju	Jatiya Party	
131	Pirojpur-3	M. A. Jabbar	Jatiya Party	
132	Pirojpur with Barisal	Manirul Islam	Jatiya Party	
133	Tangail-1	Khandaker Anwarul Haque	Combined opposition	
134	Tangail-2	Abdul Matin Mia	Jatiya Samajtantrik Dal (Siraj)	
135	Tangail-3	Saidur Rahman Khan	Jatiya Party	
136	Tangail-4	Shajahan Siraj	Jatiya Samajtantrik Dal (Siraj)	
137	Tangail-5	Mahmudul Hasan	Jatiya Party	
138	Tangail-6	Noor Muhammad Khan	Jatiya Party	
139	Tangail-7	Wajid Ali Khan Panni	Jatiya Party	
140	Tangail-8	Morshed Ali Khan Panni	Jatiya Party	
141	Jamalpur-1	Abdus Sattar	Jatiya Party	
142	Jamalpur-2	Ashraf Ud-Doullah Pahloan	Jatiya Party	
143	Jamalpur-3	Shafiqul Islam Khoka	Bangladesh Krishak Sramik Awami League	
144	Jamalpur-4	Shamsul Islam	Jatiya Party	
145	Jamalpur-5	Mohammad Reza Khan	Combined opposition	
146	Sherpur-1	Shah Rafiqul Bari Chowdhury	Jatiya Party	
147	Sherpur-2	Abdus Salam	Jatiya Party	
148	Sherpur-3	Khandakar Mohammad Khurram	Jatiya Samajtantrik Dal (Siraj)	
149	Mymensingh-1	Md. Emdadul Haque	Jatiya Party	
150	Mymensingh-2	Rajab Ali Fakir	Combined opposition	
151	Mymensingh-3	Nurul Amin Khan Pathan	Jatiya Party	
152	Mymensingh-4	Begum Mamta Wahab	Combined opposition	
153	Mymensingh-5	Shamsul Huda Chaudhury	Jatiya Party	
154	Mymensingh-6	Habib Ullah Sarkar	Combined opposition	
155	Mymensingh-7	Anisur Rahman	Jatiya Party	
156	Mymensingh-8	Fakhrul Imam	Jatiya Party	
157	Mymensingh-9	Khurram Khan Chowdhury	Combined opposition	
158	Mymensingh-10	Enamul Haque	Jatiya Party	
159	Mymensingh-11	M. A. Hamid	Jatiya Party	
160	Netrokona-1	Sirajul Islam	Combined opposition	
161	Netrokona-2	Golam Rabbani	Combined opposition	
162	Netrokona-3	Ashraf Uddin Khan	Combined opposition	
163	Netrokona-4	Ali Osman Khan	Jatiya Party	
164	Netrokona-5	Dewan Shahjahan Eaar Chowdhury	Jatiya Party	
165	Kishoreganj-1	Bazlul Karim Falu	Combined opposition	
166	Kishoreganj-2	Mohammad Nuruzzaman	Jatiya Party	
167	Kishoreganj-3	Alamgir Hossain	Jatiya Party	
168	Kishoreganj-4	Mujibul Haque	Combined opposition	
169	Kishoreganj-5	Abdul Latif Bhuiyan	Combined opposition	
170	Kishoreganj-6	Khandakar Mofizur Rahman	Combined opposition	
171	Kishoreganj-7	Abu Bakr Siddique	Jatiya Party	
172	Manikganj-1	Mohammad Siddiqur Rahman	Combined opposition	
173	Manikganj-2	Abdur Rauf Khan	Jatiya Party	
174	Manikganj-3	Abdul Malek	Jatiya Party	
175	Manikganj-4	Golam Sarwar Milon	Jatiya Party	
176	Munshiganj-1	Shah Moazzem Hossain	Jatiya Party	
177	Munshiganj-2	Iqbal Hossain	Combined opposition	
178	Munshiganj-3	Mohammad Jamal Hossain	Combined opposition	
179	Munshiganj-4	Nur Mohammad	Jatiya Party	
180	Dhaka-1	Shahid Khandaker	Jatiya Party	
181	Dhaka-2	Burhan Uddin Khan	Combined opposition	
182	Dhaka-3	Md. Saifur Rahman	Jatiya Party	
183	Dhaka-4	Syed Abu Hossain Babla	Jatiya Party	
184	Dhaka-5	Mohammad Siraj Uddin Ahmed	Combined opposition	
185	Dhaka-6	Abdur Rahim	Jatiya Party	
186	Dhaka-7	Jahangir Mohammad Adel	Jatiya Party	
187	Dhaka-8	Anwar Hossain	Combined opposition	
188	Dhaka-9	M Korban Ali	Jatiya Party	
188	Dhaka-9	Abul Hasnat	Jatiya Party	1988 by-election
189	Dhaka-10	A. S. M. Abdur Rab	Jatiya Samajtantrik Dal	
190	Dhaka-11	S. A. Khaleque	Jatiya Party	
191	Dhaka-12	Ashraf Uddin Khan Imu	Combined opposition	
192	Dhaka-13	Khan Mohammad Israfil	Jatiya Party	
193	Gazipur-1	Motiur Rahman	Jatiya Party	
194	Gazipur-2	Hasan Uddin Sarkar	Jatiya Party	
195	Gazipur-3	Mokhlesur Rahman	Combined opposition	
196	Gazipur-4	Mohammad Obaid Ullah	Combined opposition	
197	Narsingdi-1	Mustafa Jamal	Combined opposition	
198	Narsingdi-2	Delwar Hossain Khan	Jatiya Party	
199	Narsingdi-3	Shahjahan Saju	Jatiya Party	
200	Narsingdi-4	Mohammad Shahidullah Bhuiyan	Combined opposition	
201	Narsingdi-5	Moin Uddin Bhuiyan	Jatiya Party	
202	Narayanganj-1	Sultan Uddin Bhuiyan	Jatiya Party	
203	Narayanganj-2	M. A. Awal	Jatiya Party	
204	Narayanganj-3	Abu Nur Mohammad Bahaul Haq	Jatiya Party	
205	Narayanganj-4	M. A. Sattar	Jatiya Party	
206	Narayanganj-5	Nasim Osman	Jatiya Party	
207	Rajbari-1	Munshi Abdul Latif	Combined opposition	
208	Rajbari-2	Muslim Uddin	Combined opposition	
209	Faridpur-1	Shah Mohammad Abu Zafar	Jatiya Party	
210	Faridpur-2	Saifuzzaman Chowdhury Jewel	Jatiya Party	
211	Faridpur-3	Kamran Hossain Chowdhury	Jatiya Party	
212	Faridpur-4	Mohammad Azharul Haque	Jatiya Party	
213	Faridpur-5	Akhteruzzaman Babul	Jatiya Party	
214	Gopalganj-1	M. H. Khan Monjur	Combined opposition	
215	Gopalganj-2	Farid Ahmed	Combined opposition	
216	Gopalganj-3	Kazi Firoz Rashid	Jatiya Party	
217	Madaripur-1	Abul Khair Chowdhury	Combined opposition	
218	Madaripur-2	Sirajul Islam Bhuiyan	Jatiya Party	
219	Madaripur-3	Sheikh Shahidul Islam	Jatiya Party	
220	Shariatpur-1	Sardar AKM Nasiruddin	Independent	
221	Shariatpur-2	TM Giasuddin Ahmed	Jatiya Party	
222	Shariatpur-3	M. A. Reza	Independent	
223	Sunamganj-1	Badruddoza Ahmed Shuja	Jatiya Party	
224	Sunamganj-2	Golam Jilani Chowdhury	Combined opposition	
225	Sunamganj-3	Faruk Rashid Chowdhury	Communist Party of Bangladesh	
226	Sunamganj-4	Iqbal Hossain Chowdhury	NAP	
227	Sunamganj-5	Kalim Uddin Ahmed	Independent	
228	Sylhet-1	Humayun Rashid Chowdhury	Jatiya Party	
229	Sylhet-2	Maqsood Ebne Aziz Lama	Jatiya Party	
230	Sylhet-3	Abdul Mukit Khan	Jatiya Party	
231	Sylhet-4	Abdul Hannan	Jatiya Party	
232	Sylhet-5	Mahmudur Rahman Majumdar	Jatiya Party	
233	Sylhet-6	AKM Gouach Uddin	Jatiya Party	
234	Moulvibazar-1	Ebadur Rahman Chowdhury	Jatiya Party	
235	Moulvibazar-2	Nawab Ali Abbas Khan	Jatiya Party	
236	Moulvibazar-3	Gias Uddin Chowdhury	Jatiya Party	
237	Moulvibazar-4	Ahad Miah	Jatiya Party	
238	Habiganj-1	Abdul Moshabbir	Jatiya Samajtantrik Dal	
239	Habiganj-2	Sirajul Islam Khan	Jatiya Party	
240	Habiganj-3	Abu Lais Md. Mubin Chowdhury	Jatiya Party	
241	Habiganj-4	Syed Mohammad Qaisar	Jatiya Party	
242	Brahmanbaria-1	Mozammel Haque	NAP (Muzzafar)	
243	Brahmanbaria-2	Humayun Kabir	Jatiya Party	
244	Brahmanbaria-3	Humayun Kabir	Jatiya Party	
245	Brahmanbaria-4	Liaquat Ali	Jatiya Party	
245	Brahmanbaria-4	Mohammad Jahangir Osman	Jatiya Party	1988 by-election
246	Brahmanbaria-5	Kazi Md. Anwar Hossain	Jatiya Party	
247	Brahmanbaria-6	A. T. M. Wali Ashraf	Independent	
248	Comilla-1	Mohammad Mobarak Ali	Jatiya Party	
249	Comilla-2	Abdur Rashid	Jatiya Party	
250	Comilla-3	Kazi Shah Mofazzal Hossain Kaikobad	Jatiya Party	
251	Comilla-4	AFM Fakhrul Islam Munshi	Jatiya Party	
252	Comilla-5	Mohammad Yunus	Jatiya Party	
253	Comilla-6	Khandaker Abdul Mannan	Independent	
254	Comilla-7	Mahbubur Rahman	Independent	
255	Comilla-8	Ansar Ahmed	Independent	
256	Comilla-9	Monirul Haq Chowdhury	Jatiya Party	
257	Comilla-10	Saiful Islam	Jatiya Party	
258	Comilla-11	Omar Ahmed Majumder	Combined opposition	
259	Comilla-12	Kazi Zafar Ahmed	Jatiya Party	
260	Chandpur-1	A. K. S. M. Shahidul Islam	Jatiya Party	
261	Chandpur-2	Shamsul Haque	Jatiya Party	
262	Chandpur-3	Harunur Rashid Khan	Jatiya Party	
263	Chandpur-4	Mizanur Rahman Chowdhury	Jatiya Party	
264	Chandpur-5	Md. Abdur Rob	Jatiya Party	
265	Chandpur-6	Abdul Mannan	Jatiya Party	
266	Feni-1	Zafar Imam	Jatiya Party	
267	Feni-2	Joynal Abedin	Independent	
268	Feni-3	Majibul Haque Chowdhury	Jatiya Party	
269	Noakhali-1	Moudud Ahmed	Jatiya Party	
269	Noakhali-1	K. M. Hossain	Jatiya Party	1988 by-election
270	Noakhali-2	Mostafizur Rahman	Jatiya Samajtantrik Dal	
271	Noakhali-3	Mahbubur Rahman	Jatiya Party	
272	Noakhali-4	Fazle Elahi	Jatiya Party	
273	Noakhali-5	Hasna Jasimuddin Moudud	Combined opposition	
274	Noakhali-6	Mohammad Ali	Combined opposition	
275	Laxmipur-1	M. A. Gofran	Independent	
276	Laxmipur-2	Chowdhury Khurshid Alam	Jatiya Party	
277	Laxmipur-3	Abduch Sattar Master	Combined opposition	
278	Laxmipur-4	Mosharraf Hossain	Independent	
279	Chittagong-1	Abu Salek	Independent	
280	Chittagong-2	Ainul Kamal	Jatiya Samajtantrik Dal-JSD	
281	Chittagong-3	AKM Shamsul Huda	Combined opposition	
282	Chittagong-4	Mazharul Haq Shah Chowdhury	Independent	
283	Chittagong-5	Anisul Islam Mahmud	Jatiya Party	
284	Chittagong-6	Ziauddin Ahmed Bablu	Jatiya Party	
285	Chittagong-7	Nazrul Islam	Jatiya Party	
286	Chittagong-8	Liaquat Ali	Independent	
287	Chittagong-9	Mohammad Sekander Hossain Miah	Jatiya Party	
287	Chittagong-9	Harun Aur Rashid Khan	Jatiya Party	1988 by-election
288	Chittagong-10	Begum Kamrun Nahar Jafar	Independent	
289	Chittagong-11	Sirajul Islam Chowdhury	Independent	
290	Chittagong-12	Mokhtar Ahmad	Independent	
291	Chittagong-13	Afsar Uddin Ahmed	National Awami Party	
292	Chittagong-14	Ibrahim Bin Khalil	Combined opposition	
293	Chittagong-15	Mahmudul Islam Chowdhury	Jatiya Party	
294	Cox's Bazar-1	A. H. Salahuddin Mahmud	Jatiya Party	
295	Cox's Bazar-2	Jahirul Islam	Jatiya Party	
296	Cox's Bazar-3	Didarul Alam Chowdhury	Jatiya Party	
297	Cox's Bazar-4	Abdul Gani	Independent	
298	Hill Khagrachari	AKM Alim Ullah	Jatiya Party	
299	Hill Rangamati	Binoy Kumar Dewan	Jatiya Party	
300	Hill Bandarban	Mung Shwe Prue Chowdhury	Jatiya Party	
