= AKM Khalequzzaman =

Bangladeshi politician

AKM Khalequzzaman Khan Humayun
- খালেকুজ্জামান খাঁন হুমায়ুন

Member of the Bangladesh Parliament for Kishoreganj-6
- In office 7 May 1986 – 3 March 1988
- Succeeded by: Khandakar Mofizur Rahman

Personal details
- Born: Bajitpur, Kishoreganj, Mymensingh District
- Party: Bangladesh Muslim League
- Parent: Abdul Monem Khan (father)

AKM Khalequzzaman Khan Humayun (Bengali: এ কে এম খালেকুজ্জামান খাঁন হুমায়ুন) was a Bangladesh Muslim League politician and a former member of parliament for Kishoreganj-6.

== Early life ==
Khalequzzaman was born into a Bengali Muslim family in Bajitpur, Kishoreganj, Mymensingh District.

== Career ==
Ahmed stood in the 1986 Bangladeshi general elections as a Bangladesh Muslim League candidate for the newly renamed Kishoreganj-6 (Bhairab-Kuliarchar) constituency. During the 1988 Bangladeshi general elections, Ahmed was defeated by Combined Opposition candidate Khandakar Mofizur Rahman and came second place. He was again defeated at the 1991 Bangladeshi general elections by Bangladesh Nationalist Party politician Aamir Uddin Ahmod and came third place.
