= Md. Waheduzzaman Sarkar =

Bangladeshi politician

Member of Bangladesh Parliament
- In office 1996–2001
- Preceded by: Hafizur Rahman Pramanik
- Succeeded by: Abdul Aziz Mia

Personal details
- Party: Jatiya Party (Ershad)

Md. Waheduzzaman Sarkar is a Jatiya Party (Ershad) politician and a former member of parliament for Gaibandha-1.

== Career ==
Sarkar was elected to parliament from Gaibandha-1 as a Jatiya Party candidate in 1996.
