= Md. Shariful Alam =

Bangladeshi politician

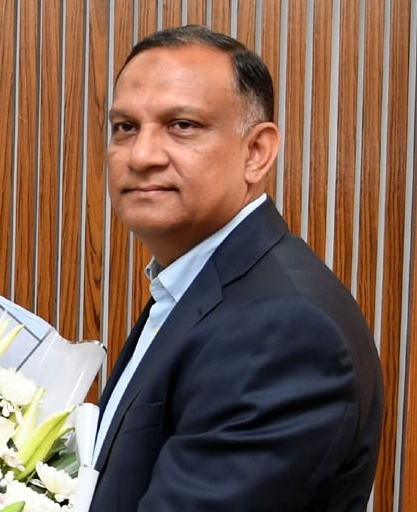
- Alam in 2026

Minister of State for Textiles and Jute
- Incumbent
- Assumed office 17 February 2026
- Prime Minister: Tarique Rahman
- Preceded by: Mirza Azam

Member of Parliament
- Incumbent
- Assumed office 17 February 2026
- Preceded by: Nazmul Hassan Papon
- Constituency: Kishoreganj-6

Personal details
- Born: 1 January 1975 (age 51) Kuliarchar Upazila, Kishoreganj District, Bangladesh
- Party: Bangladesh Nationalist Party
- Spouse: Ashura Akter
- Children: 2
- Occupation: Politician and Businessman

Md. Shariful Alam (born 1 January 1975) is a Bangladesh Nationalist Party politician and the incumbent Jatiya Sangsad member representing the Kishoreganj-6 constituency. He is the incumbent state minister of textiles and jute. He also served as the state minister for both Ministry of Industries and Ministry of Commerce from 17 February 2026 to 4 March 2026.

== Early life and education ==
Shariful Alam was born on 1 January 1975 in Betiarkandin village of Kuliarchar Upazila, Kishoreganj District to Md. Siddiq Mia and Rasheda Begum.

== Career ==
On 21 September 2025, Alam was elected President of Kishoreganj District unit of the Bangladesh Nationalist Party.

In 2026, he was elected for the first time as a Member of Parliament from Kishoreganj-6 constituency in the 13th National Parliamentary Election.
