= Mustafizur Rahman Bhuiyan Dipu =

Bangladeshi politician (born 1976)

Mustafizur Rahman Bhuiyan
- মোস্তাফিজুর রহমান ভূঁইয়া

Member of the Bangladesh Parliament for Narayanganj-1
- Incumbent
- Assumed office 17 February 2026
- Preceded by: Golam Dastagir Gazi

Personal details
- Born: 1 April 1976 (age 50) Shariatganj, Bangladesh
- Party: BNP
- Education: MBA from North South University
- Occupation: Industrialist

Mostafizur Rahman Bhuiyan Dipu is a Bangladeshi industrialist and politician. He is a member of the Jatiya Sangsad.

== Biography ==
Mostafizur Rahman Bhuiyan Dipu was born into the Bhuiyan family of Rupganj. His grandfather, Gool Bux Bhuiyan, was one of the leading businessmen in East Pakistan. His father, Mujibur Rahman Bhuiyan, was the proprietor of Gausia Group and chairman of Rupganj Upazila Council. Dipu is an industrialist by profession and a director of Gausia Corporation. In his political career, Dipu is a member of the executive committee of the Bangladesh Nationalist Party. In 2025, he became the senior joint convener of the party's Narayanganj district unit. In the same year, he was elected president of the Narayanganj Chamber of Commerce and Industry and was elected president of the board of directors of Bangladesh Real Estate Club Limited for the 2025–2026 term. In 2026, he was elected Member of Parliament from the Narayanganj-1 constituency in the 2026 Bangladeshi general election.
