= Aamir Uddin Ahmod =

Bangladeshi politician

Member of Bangladesh Parliament
- In office 1991–1996
- Preceded by: Khandakar Mofizur Rahman
- Succeeded by: Mujibur Rahman Monju

Personal details
- Born: 1926 (age 99–100) Nikli, Bengal Presidency, British India
- Party: Bangladesh Nationalist Party

Aamir Uddin Ahmod (Bengali: আমির উদ্দিন আহমদ) is a Bangladesh Nationalist Party politician and a former member of parliament for Mymensingh-23 and Kishoreganj-6.

== Biography ==
Aamir Uddin Ahmod was born in 1926 in Nikli in what is now Kishoreganj District, Bangladesh.

Ahmod was elected to parliament from Mymensingh-23 as a Bangladesh Nationalist Party candidate in 1979.

He was elected to parliament from Kishoreganj-6 as a Bangladesh Nationalist Party candidate in 1991. He was re-elected in February 1996.
