= Nizam Uddin Jalil John =

Bangladeshi politician

- নিজাম উদ্দিন জলিল জন

Member of the Bangladesh Parliament for Naogaon-5
- In office 30 January 2019 – 6 August 2024
- Preceded by: Md. Abdul Maleque
- Succeeded by: Md. Zahidul Islam Dhalu

Personal details
- Born: 9 August 1991 (age 35)
- Parent: Abdul Jalil (father)
- Occupation: Politician, legal advisor

Nizam Uddin Jalil John (born 9 August 1991) is a Bangladeshi politician and a former member of the Jatiya Sangsad representing the Naogaon-5 constituency. He was elected in the 2018 election as a candidate of the Awami League.

During his term, John served on parliamentary committees and acted as a legal advisor to several local development initiatives.

He did not contest the 2026 general election, and Md. Zahidul Islam Dhalu of the Bangladesh Nationalist Party won the Naogaon-5 seat.

== Personal life ==
Jalil was born in Naogaon Sadar Upazila, Naogaon District. His father's name is Abdul Jalil, who served as the general secretary of the Awami League, and his mother's name is Rehana Jalil. He joined the law profession in 2018.

== Political life ==
Nizam Uddin Jalil John was elected to the Jatiya Sangsad in the 2018 election as a candidate of the Awami League, representing the Naogaon-5 constituency. At the time, he was one of the youngest members of the 11th National Parliament.

During his tenure, John served on parliamentary committees and acted as a legal advisor for local development and governance projects in Naogaon-5. He completed his term on 6 August 2024, after which he did not contest the 2026 general election, and the seat was won by Md. Zahidul Islam Dhalu of the Bangladesh Nationalist Party.
