= Shamsul Islam (Munshiganj politician) =

Bangladeshi politician (1932–2018)

- শামসুল ইসলাম

Minister of Information
- In office 1993 – January 1996
- Preceded by: Nazmul Huda
- Succeeded by: Abu Sayeed
- In office 6 May 2004 – 29 October 2006
- Preceded by: Tariqul Islam
- Succeeded by: Abul Kalam Azad

Ministry of Land
- In office 10 October 2001 – 6 May 2004
- Succeeded by: Rezaul Karim Hira

Minister of Commerce
- In office 1993 – January 1996
- Preceded by: M. K. Anwar
- Succeeded by: Tofail Ahmed

Minister of Food
- In office 1991–1993
- Succeeded by: Matia Chowdhury

State Minister of Post and Telecommunications
- In office 20 March 1991 – September 1991

Member of Parliament for Munshiganj-3
- In office 5 March 1991 – 27 October 2006
- Preceded by: Mohammad Jamal Hossain
- Succeeded by: M. Idris Ali

Ambassador of Bangladesh to Indonesia
- In office 28 December 1979 – 30 May 1982
- Preceded by: A. H. S. Ataul Karim
- Succeeded by: Moinul Hossain Chowdhury

Personal details
- Born: 1 January 1932
- Died: 26 April 2018 (aged 86) Dhaka, Bangladesh
- Party: Bangladesh Nationalist Party

M Shamsul Islam (1 January 1932 – 26 April 2018) was a Bangladesh Nationalist Party politician, a diplomat and a Jatiya Sangsad member representing the Munshiganj-3 constituency for four terms. He served as the minister of information, land, commerce, food and post and telecommunications during the first (1991–1996) and third Khaleda ministries (2001–2006).

== Career ==
Shamsul Islam served as the general secretary of Dhaka district unit and an executive member of the central committee of the now-defunct National Democratic Front party, led by Huseyn Shaheed Suhrawardy. He was also the general secretary of East Pakistan Family Planning Union during 1968–1971.

Shamsul Islam served as the Bangladesh ambassador to Indonesia during Ziaur Rahman's ruling.

Shamsul Islam was a member of the standing committee of Bangladesh Nationalist Party.

On 2 September 2007, the Anti-Corruption Commission filed a case against Shamsul Islam, along with the former Prime Minister Khaleda Zia and others on charges of awarding Global Agro Trade Company a cargo-handling deal through misuse of power. He was later detained and freed on bail in July 2008.

== Personal life ==
Shamsul Islam was married to Anwara Sufia (d. 2015). Together they had two sons including Sayeeful Islam, a former president of the Dhaka Chamber of Commerce & Industry.
