= Md. Quamruzzaman Ratan =

Bangladeshi politician

Md. Quamruzzaman Rata
- মো. কামরুজ্জামান রতন

Member of the Bangladesh Parliament for Munshiganj-3
- Incumbent
- Assumed office 17 February 2026
- Preceded by: Mohammad Faisal Biplob

Personal details
- Born: January 31, 1965 (age 61)q Gazaria Upazila, Munshiganj District
- Party: Bangladesh Nationalist Party

Md. Quamruzzaman Ratan is a Bangladeshi politician of the Bangladesh Nationalist Party. He is currently serving as a member of parliament from Munshiganj-3.

== Early life ==
Quamruzzaman was born on 31 January 1965 in Gazaria Upazila in Munshiganj District.

== Controversy and criticism ==
On 17 October 2026, Ratan faced criticism over remarks he made during an episode of the talk show Kora Alap on Star News, which discussed the execution of two Bangladeshi nationals in Saudi Arabia. During the discussion Ratan said, "I don't want these sinful bodies to come to Bangladesh." The remarks concerned the repatriation of the bodies of the two nationals, who had been executed after being convicted of committing indecent acts inside a mosque in Mecca. Critics objected to his description of the deceased and his statement opposing the return of their bodies to Bangladesh. On 19 October 2026, Ratan apologised and withdrew his remarks in a statement published on his verified Facebook page and explained that he had spoken emotionally.
