= Zillur Rahman =

President of Bangladesh from 2009 to 2013

- জিল্লুর রহমান
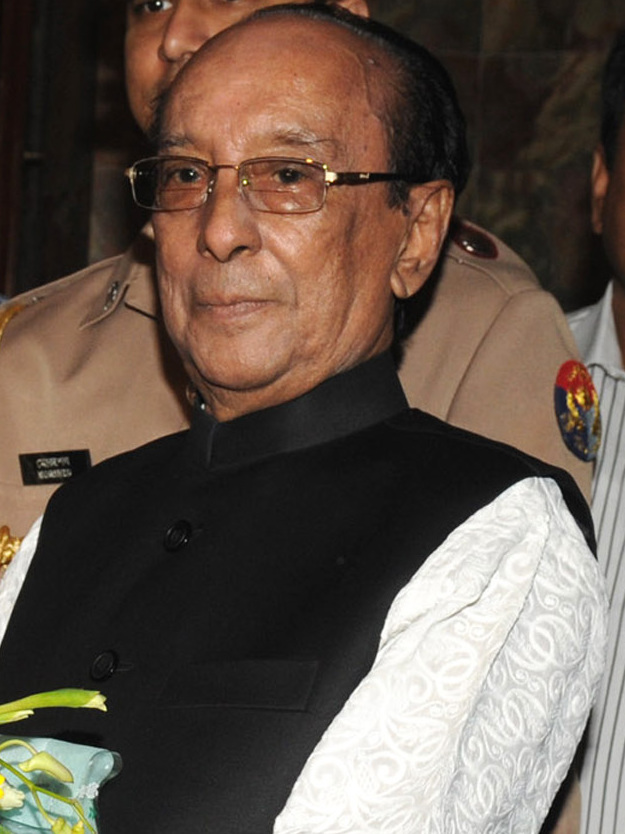
- Rahman in 2011

President of Bangladesh
- In office 12 February 2009 – 20 March 2013
- Prime Minister: Sheikh Hasina
- Preceded by: Iajuddin Ahmed
- Succeeded by: Mohammad Abdul Hamid

Minister of Local Government, Rural Development and Co-operatives
- In office 23 January 1996 – 15 July 2001
- Prime Minister: Sheikh Hasina
- Preceded by: Abdus Salam Talukder
- Succeeded by: Abdul Mannan Bhuiyan

Member of Parliament
- In office 25 January 2009 – 11 February 2009
- Preceded by: Mujibur Rahman Monju
- Succeeded by: Nazmul Hassan
- Constituency: Kishoreganj-6
- In office 28 October 2001 – 27 October 2006
- Preceded by: Himself
- Succeeded by: Position Abolished
- Constituency: Kishoreganj-7
- In office 14 July 1996 – 3 July 2001
- Preceded by: Shafiqul Islam
- Succeeded by: Himself
- Constituency: Kishoreganj-7
- In office 7 May 1986 – 3 March 1988
- Preceded by: Position Established
- Succeeded by: Abu Bakr Siddique
- Constituency: Kishoreganj-7
- In office 7 March 1973 – 6 November 1975
- Preceded by: Position Established
- Succeeded by: Position Abolished
- Constituency: Mymensingh-32

Member of Constituent Assembly of Bangladesh
- In office 10 April 1972 – 16 December 1972
- Preceded by: Position Established
- Succeeded by: Position Abolished
- Constituency: Mymensingh-16

5th & 8th General Secretary of Awami League
- In office 5 January 1992 – 12 May 2002
- President: Sheikh Hasina
- Preceded by: Syeda Sajeda Chowdhury
- Succeeded by: Abdul Jalil
- In office 12 January 1972 – 29 September 1976
- President: Sheikh Mujibur Rahman; Abul Hasnat Muhammad Qamaruzzaman
- Preceded by: Tajuddin Ahmad
- Succeeded by: Abdur Razzaq

Personal details
- Born: Mohammed Zillur Rahman; 9 March 1929 Bhairab, Bengal, British India
- Died: 20 March 2013 (aged 84) Mount Elizabeth Hospital, Singapore
- Resting place: Banani graveyard, Dhaka, Bangladesh
- Citizenship: British subject (until 1947); Pakistan (1947–1971); Bangladesh (from 1971)
- Party: Awami League
- Other political affiliations: Grand Alliance (2008–2013)
- Spouse: Ivy Rahman (m. 1958; died 2004)
- Children: 3 Nazmul Hassan
- Education: University of Dhaka (MA, LLB)

Mohammed Zillur Rahman (Note: Bengali: মোহাম্মদ জিল্লুর রহমান, romanized: Môhammod Zillur Rôhman [ˈmoɦɑmmod ˈd͡ʒilːur ˈɾɔɦmɑn]) (9 March 1929 – 20 March 2013) was a Bangladeshi politician who served as President of Bangladesh from 2009 until his death in 2013. He was also a senior presidium member of the Awami League. He is the third president of Bangladesh to die in office and the first to die of natural causes, as both Sheikh Mujibur Rahman and Ziaur Rahman were assassinated.

== Early life ==
Zillur Rahman was born on 9 March 1929 in Bhairab Upazila, Kishoreganj District, his mother's paternal home. His father, Meher Ali Miyan, was a lawyer, the Chairman of the Mymensingh Local Board and Member of the District Board.

Zillur Rahman's early education started at a nearby primary school named Bhairab Model Govt. Primary school. In 1946, he passed Matriculation from Bhairab K. B. High School. He graduated with an Intermediate of Arts (IA) in 1947 from Dhaka College. In 1954, he got his MA with Honours in History and an LL.B. degree from Dhaka University.

== Career ==
Zillur Rahman became close with Sheikh Mujibur Rahman during the campaign for the 1947 Sylhet referendum. He participated in the Bengali language movement of 1952. He held a student gathering on 19 February 1952 at Dhaka University as part of the language movement. In 1953, he was expelled by Dhaka University for his role in the language Movement but the order was rescinded in the face of student protests. He was the vice-chairman of election steering committee for the greater Mymensingh region during the 1954 election. He was the president of the Awami League affiliated East Pakistan Awami Swechchhasebak League. In 1956 he was elected President of the Kishoreganj subdivision unit of Awami League. He served as the General Secretary of Dhaka District Bar Association.

Later, as an Awami League candidate, Zillur Rahman was elected as a member of parliament in the 1970 national elections of Pakistan. During the Bangladesh Liberation War, Zillur Rahman actively participated in the Government-in-exile. He was a contributor to the Daily Joy Bangla. After the war, Zillur Rahman became the General Secretary of Awami League in 1972. He was elected as a member of the parliament in the 1973 general elections. In 1974, he was elected General Secretary of the Awami League. In 1975 he was appointed to the Central Committee of Bangladesh Krishak Sramik Awami League and made its secretary. After the assassination of Sheikh Mujibur Rahman, Zillur Rahman was arrested by the army junta and spent four years in prison. In 1981, he served as a Presidium Member of Awami League. he was elected to the parliament in 1986 and was imprisoned the same year. In 1992, he was made the general secretary of Awami League.

Zillur Rahman served as a Minister of Local Government, Rural Development and Co-operatives and the deputy leader of parliament in the Awami League government between 1996 and 2001. He was re-elected General Secretary of Bangladesh Awami League in 1997. He was re-elected to Parliament in 2001. His wife, Ivy Rahman, was killed the 2004 Dhaka grenade attack. She was a leader of Bangladesh Awami League and its women's front the Mohila League. He served as the temporary President of Bangladesh Awami League during the 2006–08 Bangladeshi political crisis when President of Bangladesh Awami League, Sheikh Hasina, was imprisoned by the military-backed caretaker government. He was re-elected to Parliament in 2008.

=== Presidency ===
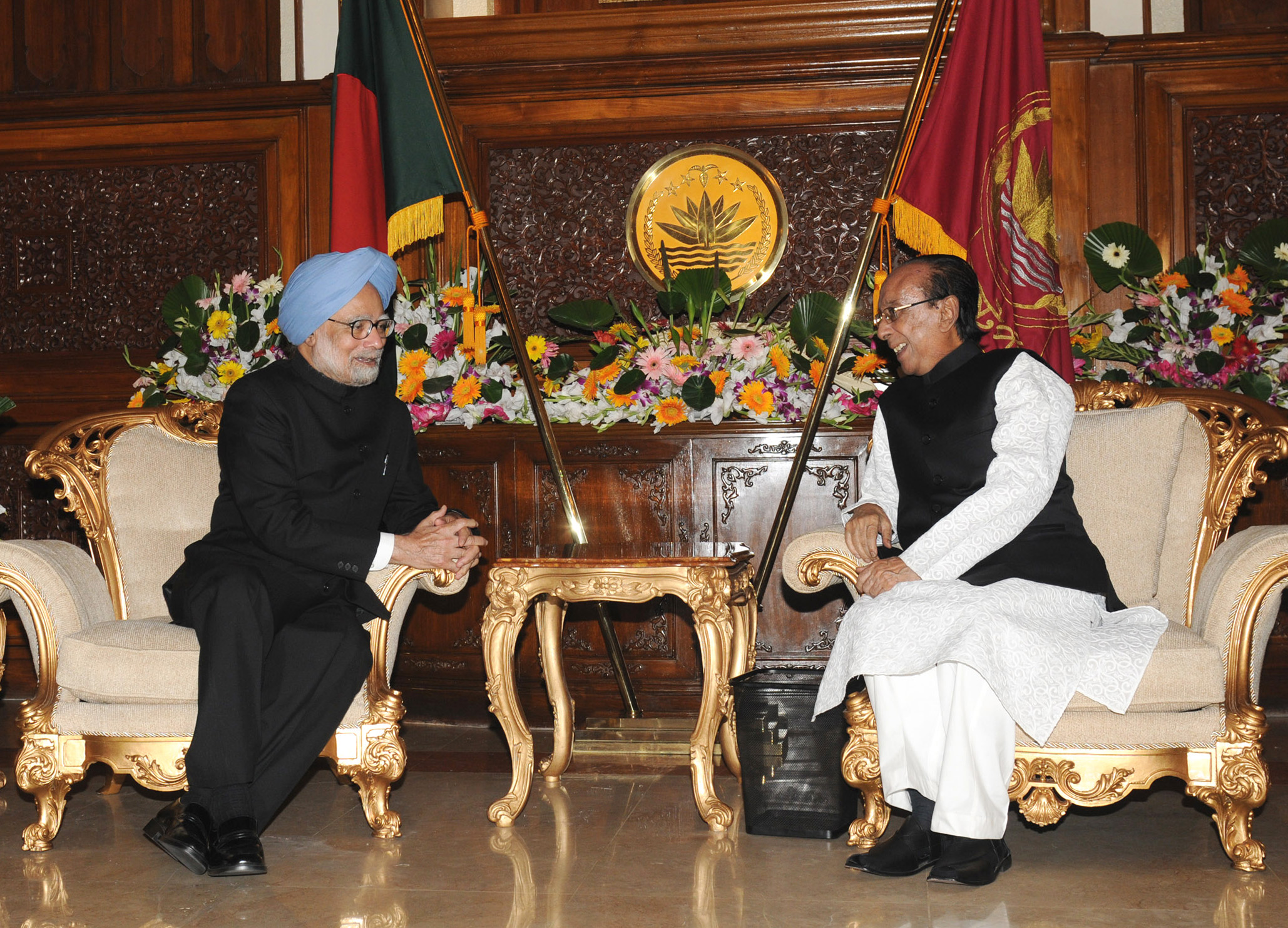
Rahman and Indian Prime Minister Manmohan Singh in Dhaka, 7 September 2011

Zillur Rahman was sworn in as the 14th president of Bangladesh on 12 February 2009. He was elected president of Bangladesh uncontested. In May 2009 in a meeting with the Dhaka Chamber of Commerce and Industry, he called for caution over the global recession and emphasized the importance of globalization. He was the Chief Scout of Bangladesh and expressed happiness over Bangladesh becoming the 5th largest scout country in the world during his term. As President he was the Supreme Commander of the Bangladesh Armed Forces. He had called for the modernizing of the Armed Forces. He called for improving ties between the Air Forces of South Asian countries.

On 27 September 2010, Zillur Rahman appointed Justice A. B. M. Khairul Haque to be the 19th chief justice of Bangladesh. He called for their training to be improved to facilitate the modernization. In 2012, he asked the Organisation of Islamic Conference countries to pressure Myanmar to take back the Rohingya refugees. He called for expanding trade and diplomatic ties with Cuba after the Cuban ambassador to Bangladesh presented his credentials on 10 February 2012. On 28 January 2013, he criticised Bangladesh Nationalist Party, then the opposition party, for not participating in the parliament and carrying out their duties.

=== Clemency power exercised by Zillur Rahman ===
Zillur Rahman exercised his power to grant clemency to as many as 21 individuals while he was in office. In contrast, only four pardons were granted by his predecessors between 1972 and 2008. Among the people for whom Zillur Rahman exercised his clemency power is A H M Biplob who was convicted in the case of murdering a lawyer. The Sessions Court awarded Biplob, son of Awami League leader and Mayor of Laxmipur municipality Abu Taher, the death penalty for the murder in absentia. Following applications from Biplob's mother, Zillur Rahman, the then President pardoned Biplob in the murder case of the lawyer in July 2011 and, then in February 2012, remitted the two other life imprisonments to ten years imprisonments.

== Personal life ==
Zillur Rahman was married to fellow Awami League politician Ivy Rahman, the party's secretary for women's affairs. Ivy was killed in the 2004 Dhaka grenade attack. Together they had one son – Nazmul Hassan Papon – and two daughters – Tania Bakht and Tanima Bakht. Papon was the president of the Bangladesh Cricket Board, managing director of Beximco Pharma and an MP.

== Illness and death ==
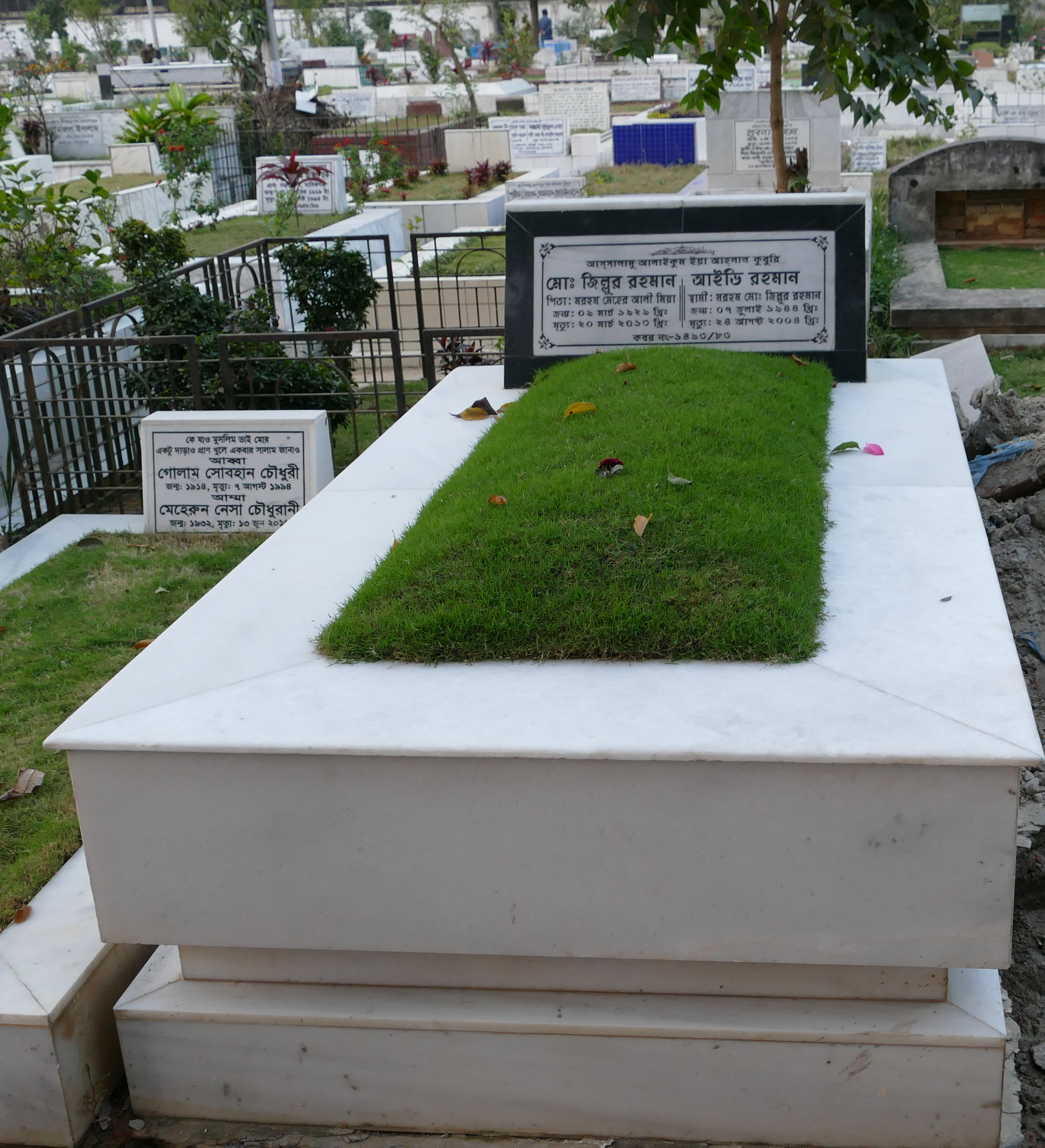
Rahman's grave at Banani Graveyard

Zillur Rahman died at Mount Elizabeth Hospital in Singapore aged 84 on 20 March 2013 after he was flown to the country by an air ambulance for critical lung infection on 10 March. It followed his admission to the Combined Military Hospital (CMH) at Dhaka cantonment the previous day, which was his 84th birthday. In Singapore, he had been undergoing treatment for kidney and respiratory problems since 11 March. Bangladesh's High Commissioner in Singapore Mahbub Uz Zaman announced: "The president died at a hospital here in Singapore at 6:47 pm local time." At the time of his death his children were with him. In his absence, Parliamentary Speaker Abdul Hamid was appointed as acting president on 14 March. A presidential spokesman later announced that Hamid has declared three days of national mourning. He was buried in Dhaka's Banani graveyard.

In reaction to his death, Prime Minister Sheikh Hasina's immediate response was to express profound shock and that the death was "an irreparable loss to the country and its people," according to her Press Secretary Abul Kalam Azad. In 2013, Hasina declared that the Mirpur-Airport Road Flyover will be named after him.

Political offices
Preceded by Iajuddin Ahmed	President of Bangladesh; 2009–2013	Succeeded by Mohammad Abdul Hamid
