= Kishoreganj-6 =

Constituency of Bangladesh's Jatiya Sangsad

Coordinates: 24.06°N 90.98°E

- Constituency for the Jatiya Sangsad
- District: Kishoreganj District
- Division: Dhaka Division
- Electorate: 332,651 (2018)

Current constituency
- Created: 1984
- Member of Parliament: Md. Shariful Alam
- ← 166 Kishoreganj-5 168 Manikganj-1 →

Kishoreganj-6 is a constituency represented in the Jatiya Sangsad (National Parliament) of Bangladesh.

== Boundaries ==
The constituency encompasses Bhairab and Kuliarchar upazilas.

== History ==
The constituency was created in 1984 from a Mymensingh constituency when the former Mymensingh District was split into four districts: Mymensingh, Sherpur, Netrokona, and Kishoreganj.

== Members of Parliament ==
Election	Member	Party
1986	AKM Khalequzzaman	Muslim League
1988	Khandakar Mofizur Rahman	Combined Opposition Party
1991	Aamir Uddin Ahmod	BNP
1996	Mujibur Rahman Monju	BNP
2008	Zillur Rahman	Awami League
2009 by-election	Nazmul Hassan Papon	Awami League
2026	Md. Shariful Alam	Bangladesh Nationalist Party

== Elections ==
=== Elections in the 2010s ===
Nazmul Hassan Papon was re-elected unopposed in the 2014 general election after opposition parties withdrew their candidacies in a boycott of the election.

=== Elections in the 2000s ===
In February 2009, Zillur Rahman became President of Bangladesh, vacating his parliamentary seat. Nazmul Hassan Papon, his son, was elected in the resulting March by-election.

Kishoreganj-6 by-election, 2009
Party	Candidate	Votes	%	±%
AL	Nazmul Hassan Papon	106,137	60.8	−0.9
BNP	Shariful Alam	68,327	39.2	+0.9
Majority		37.810	21.7	−1.7
Turnout		174,464	68.1	−23.4
AL hold				

General Election 2008: Kishoreganj-6
Party	Candidate	Votes	%	±%
AL	Zillur Rahman	144,587	61.7	+14.8
BNP	Shariful Alam	89,837	38.3	−13.4
Majority		54,750	23.4	+18.5
Turnout		234,424	91.5	+12.2
AL gain from BNP				

General Election 2001: Kishoreganj-6
Party	Candidate	Votes	%	±%
BNP	Mujibur Rahman Monju	83,698	51.7	+13.6
AL	Zillur Rahman	75,818	46.9	+11.2
IJOF	Md. Ashraf Ali	1,284	0.8	N/A
Independent	Nasrin Monem Khan	540	0.3	N/A
KSJL	Md. Fazlur Rahman	247	0.2	N/A
WPB	Md. Nazrul Islam	127	0.1	N/A
Independent	Md. Monirul Alam	106	0.1	−0.2
Majority		7,880	4.9	+2.5
Turnout		161,820	79.3	+2.6
BNP hold				

=== Elections in the 1990s ===
General Election June 1996: Kishoreganj-6
Party	Candidate	Votes	%	±%
BNP	Mujibur Rahman Monju	47,176	38.1	−6.4
AL	Md. Ataul Haque	44,261	35.7	+12.9
JP(E)	Nurul Islam	24,292	19.6	+16.7
Jamaat	Md. Ramjan Ali	5,274	4.3	N/A
Hak Kathar Mancha	Syed Sirajul Huda	1,340	1.1	N/A
Zaker Party	Md. Mohibur Rahman	405	0.3	−0.8
Independent	Md. Monirul Alam	370	0.3	N/A
Gano Forum	Nrependra Chandra Ghose	295	0.2	N/A
Democratic Republican Party	Nurul Alam Makhon	247	0.2	N/A
Bangladesh People's Party	Md. Wahiduzzaman	191	0.2	N/A
Majority		2,915	2.4	−19.3
Turnout		123,851	76.7	+18.6
BNP hold				

General Election 1991: Kishoreganj-6
Party	Candidate	Votes	%	±%
BNP	Amir Uddin Ahmed	46,586	44.5	
AL	A. Latif	23,858	22.8	
Bangladesh Muslim League (Aian Uddin)	AKM Khalequzzaman	11,953	11.4	
Bangladesh Samyabadi Dal (Marxist-Leninist)	Yakub Ali	6,847	6.5	
Independent	Abu Sayeed Imam	3,947	3.8	
JP(E)	Zahir Uddin Ahmed	3,043	2.9	
Independent	Khondakar Mofizur Rahman	2,384	2.3	
Independent	Zamal Uddin Vuiyan	1,347	1.3	
Zaker Party	Abul Hashem Vuiyan	1,203	1.1	
Independent	Sk. Mujibar Rahman	986	0.9	
CPB	Nurul Islam	984	0.9	
Independent	Md. Manjur Ahmed	903	0.9	
Jatiya Samajtantrik Dal-JSD	Shukhel Ahmed Farid	405	0.4	
Independent	Md. A. Rahman Borhan	274	0.3	
Majority		22,728	21.7	
Turnout		104,720	58.1	
BNP gain from				
