= Md Mazedur Rahman =

Bangladeshi politician

Md. Mazedur Rahman

Members of Parliament
- Incumbent
- Assumed office 17 February 2026
- Preceded by: Abdullah Nahid Nigar
- Constituency: Gaibandha-1

Personal details
- Party: Bangladesh Jamaat-e-Islami
- Occupation: Politician

Md. Mazedur Rahman is a Bangladesh Jamaat-e-Islami politician and is incumbent Jatiya Sangsad member representing the Gaibandha-1 constituency in 2026.
