= M. Idris Ali =

Bangladeshi politician

Member of Parliament for Munshiganj-3
- In office 2008–2014
- Preceded by: M Shamsul Islam
- Succeeded by: Mrinal Kanti Das
- Constituency: Munshiganj-3

Personal details
- Born: 10 January 1945 (age 80)
- Political party: Bangladesh Awami League

M. Idris Ali (Bengali: এম ইদ্রিস আলী) is a Bangladesh Awami League politician and a former member of parliament of Munshiganj-3.

== Early life ==
Ali was born on 10 January 1945.

== Career ==
Ali was elected to parliament from Munshiganj-3 as a Bangladesh Awami League candidate on 30 December 2008.
