= Md. Abdul Maleque =

Bangladeshi politician (1947–2024)

- মো: আব্দুল মালেক

Member of Parliament for Naogaon-5
- In office 6 May 2013 – 29 January 2019
- Preceded by: Abdul Jalil
- Succeeded by: Nizam Uddin Jalil John

Personal details
- Born: 15 January 1947 Naogaon, Rajshahi Division, Bengal Province, British India
- Died: 9 September 2024 (aged 77) Rajshahi, Bangladesh
- Party: Bangladesh Awami League

Md. Abdul Maleque (Bengali: মো: আব্দুল মালেক; 15 January 1947 – 9 September 2024) was a Bangladeshi politician. He was the chairman of the Naogaon District branch of the Bangladesh Awami League. He was a member of parliament from Naogaon-5.

== Early life ==
Abdul Maleque was born on 15 January 1947. He had an M.A. degree.

== Political career ==
Abdul Maleque's political career started before the independence of Bangladesh from Pakistan. He was a member of Bangladesh Chhatra League. He participated in the Liberation War of Bangladesh. In 2009, Abdul Maleque was elected as the chairman of the upazila parishad of Naogaon Sadar Upazila. In 2013, the constituency of Naogaon-5 fell vacant upon the death of Abdul Jalil. The Awami League nominated Abdul Maleque as their candidate for the by-election. As there was no other candidate, he was elected to parliament unopposed. In 2014 general election, he was again nominated by Awami League and won.

== Death ==
Abdul Maleque died at the Rajshahi Medical College Hospital on 9 September 2024, at the age of 77.
