= Golam Mostafa Ahmed =

Bangladeshi politician

Member of Parliament for Gaibandha-1
- In office 22 March 2017 – 19 December 2017
- Preceded by: Manjurul Islam Liton
- Succeeded by: Shamim Haider Patwary

Personal details
- Died: 19 December 2017 Dhaka, Bangladesh
- Party: Bangladesh Awami League

Golam Mostafa Ahmed (died 19 December 2017) was a Bangladeshi politician and a member of parliament from Gaibandha-1.

== Career ==
Ahmed was elected to parliament from Gaibandha-1 in March 2017 in a by-election as a Bangladesh Awami League candidate. The by-elections were called after the incumbent Manjurul Islam Liton was assassinated.

== Death ==
Ahmed was injured on 18 November 2017 in a road accident in Delduar Upazila, Tangail. He died from his injuries on 19 December 2017 in Combined Military Hospital, Dhaka.
