= Abdul Matin Chowdhury (politician) =

Bangladeshi politician

Minister of Home Affairs
- In office 1991–1996
- Succeeded by: Mohammed Nasim

Minister of Textiles and Jute
- In office 2001–2006
- Succeeded by: Abdul Latif Siddiqui

Member of the Bangladesh Parliament for Narayanganj-1
- In office 28 October 2001 – 27 October 2006
- Preceded by: K M Shafiullah
- Succeeded by: Golam Dastagir Gazi
- In office 5 March 1991 – 30 March 1996
- Preceded by: Sultan Uddin Bhuiyan

Personal details
- Born: 1944 Narayanganj, Bengal Province, British India
- Died: 4 August 2012 (aged 78) Dhaka, Bangladesh
- Party: Bangladesh Nationalist Party

Abdul Matin Chowdhury (1944 – 4 August 2012) was a Bangladeshi politician. He served as the vice president and joint secretary general of Bangladesh Nationalist Party (BNP). He was appointed as the Minister of Home Affairs at the first Khaleda Zia cabinet during 1991–1996. He was elected to the Jatiya Sangsad four times since 1979.

== Career ==
Chowdhury was a Muslim League politician before 1971. He was a member of the BNP's standing committee from 1991 to 2008.

== Death ==
Chowdhury died on 4 August 2012.
