= Abdul Aziz Mia =

Bangladesh Jamaat-e-Islami politician

Member of Parliament for Gaibandha-1
- In office 2001–2006
- Preceded by: Md. Waheduzzaman Sarkar
- Succeeded by: Abdul Kader Khan

Personal details
- Born: 1951 or 1952 (age 73–74)
- Party: Bangladesh Jamaat-e-Islami
- Education: Rajshahi University

Abu Saleh Mohammad Abdul Aziz Mia (born 1951/1952; known as Abdul Aziz Mia and Ghoramara Aziz) is a Bangladesh Jamaat-e-Islami politician and a former Jatiya Sangsad member from the Gaibandha-1 constituency during 2001–2006. In 2017, he was sentenced to capital punishment for committing crimes against humanity during the Liberation War in 1971.

== Career ==
Aziz is a central committee member of the Bangladesh Jamaat-e-Islami party. Abdul Aziz Miah was elected Member of Parliament in the 2001 Election from Gaibandha-1 (Sunderganj) Constituency as a four-party alliance candidate from Bangladesh Jamaat-e-Islami. In June 2016, he, along with five others, was charged with genocide, murder, illegal confinement, loot, arson, torture and other crimes during Bangladesh's Liberation War in 1971.
