= K. M. Aminul Islam =

Bangladeshi politician

K.M. Aminul Islam Khan

Member of Bangladesh Parliament for Munshiganj-3
- In office 1986–1988

Personal details
- Party: Jatiya Party (Ershad)

Military service
- Allegiance: Bangladesh; Pakistan (Before 1972)
- Branch/service: Bangladesh Air Force; Pakistan Air Force
- Years of service: 1951-1977
- Rank: Air Vice-Marshal
- Unit: No.11 Squadron, GD(N)
- Commands: Director Directorate of Forces Intelligence
- Battles/wars: Flight 472

K.M. Aminul Islam Khan (Bengali: কে.এম. আমিনুল ইসলাম খান) was a former one time Jatiya Party (Ershad) member of parliament for Munshiganj-3. He was the paternal uncle of Wing Commander M. Hamidullah Khan TJ, SH(Sitara Herb) BP(Bir Protik), (BAF, Retd.), who was the BDF Commander, Sector 11, 1971 War of Independence and a public official.

== Career ==
Aminul Islam Khan was an Air Force officer in the Pakistan Air Force as a Wing Commander. He was jailed in India during the war of independence in 1971 due to espionage at the border area. Khan's course mate AVM A. K. Khandker Chief of Air staff of BAF after independence secured his coursemate's release from the captive of Indian authorities and enrolled him to Ministry of Home Affairs on deputation from Banglaresh Air Force. A.K. Khandekar promoted Khan to Air Vice-Marshal skipping two subordinate ranks, and later secured him an appointment as the third director of the Directorate of Forces Intelligence under the Ministry of Home Affairs, which was later christened as Directorate General of Forces Intelligence headed by a director general umder the executive presidency. Aminul Islam Khan was relieved of duty and dismissed from service after the 1977 hijack of Japan Airlines Flight 472 and the uprising to topple the government that ensued which was unsuccessful. Khan was favoured again by his coursemate A. K. Khandekar to be inducted to H. M. Ershads cabinet for a short stint.

Islam entered politics during the martial law of military dictatorship of H. M. Ershad, as a government minister for a short stint of one and a half years. The car of Islam, who was Religious Affairs Minister at the time, was stoned near the University of Dhaka during an anti-marshal law strike in January 1986. Khan was elected to parliament from Munshiganj-3 as a Jatiya Party candidate in 1986. He soon migrated to America with his family through the US Diversity Visa Program.
