= Shamim Haider Patwary =

Bangladeshi Politician

- শামীম হায়দার পাটোয়ারী

General Secretary of Jatiya Party
- Incumbent
- Assumed office 8 July 2025
- Preceded by: Mujibul Haque

Member of Parliament
- In office 13 March 2018 – 29 January 2024
- Preceded by: Golam Mostafa Ahmed
- Succeeded by: Abdullah Nahid Nigar
- Constituency: Gaibandha-1

Personal details
- Born: 25 September 1981 (age 45)
- Citizenship: Bangladeshi
- Party: Jatiya Party
- Education: Notre Dame College; Dhaka International University; University of London
- Profession: Politician, lawyer

Shamim Haider Patwary (Bengali: শামীম হায়দার পাটোয়ারী; born 25 September 1981) is a Bangladeshi politician, lawyer, and academic. He is currently the Secretary General of the Jatiya Party (Ershad) and served as a member of the Jatiya Sangsad representing the Gaibandha-1 constituency from 2018 to 2024.

== Early life and education ==
Patwary was born on 25 September 1981 in Gaibandha District, Bangladesh. He completed his LL.B. (Hons) from the University of London and Dhaka International University. He later obtained the Bar Vocational Course (BVC) from the Inns of Court School of Law, City University, London, and was called to the Bar of England and Wales. Patwary also earned a Postgraduate Certificate in Intellectual Property Law from the University of London and a Diploma in Human Rights (with distinction) from Dhaka International University.

== Political career ==
Patwary entered politics through the Jatiya Party (Ershad). He served as an adviser to the party’s founder, Hussain Muhammad Ershad, and later became a presidium member and additional secretary general. Also Shamim was elected to parliament as a Jatiya Party candidate from Gaibandha-1 in a March 2018 by-election following the death of the incumbent Member of Parliament, Golam Mostafa Ahmed, of Bangladesh Awami League. He later served as a Member of the 11th parliament from Gaibandha-1 representing the Jatiya Party.

He lost the 2024 general election to Abdullah Nahid Nigar, an Awami League politician who ran as an independent candidate.

== Personal life ==
Patwary is also the Chairman of the Board of Trustees at Dhaka International University. He is active in academic, legal, and political spheres and is known for his media presence.
