= Kazi Firoz Rashid =

Bangladeshi politician

- কাজী ফিরোজ রশীদ
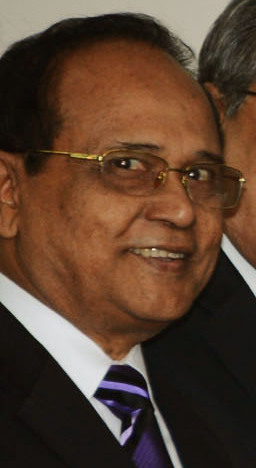
- Rashid in 2013

Member of the Bangladesh Parliament for Dhaka-6
- In office 29 January 2014 – 29 January 2024
- Preceded by: Mizanur Rahman Khan Dipu
- Succeeded by: Sayeed Khokon

Personal details
- Born: 2 February 1947 (age 79)
- Party: Jatiya Party

Kazi Firoz Rashid (born 2 February 1947) is a Jatiya Party politician and a former member of parliament for Gopalganj-3 and Dhaka-6.

Rashid started politics at a very early age. When he was in class nine in school, he participated in the movement against Pakistan's then President Ayub Khan's education system. During his study at university, he was elected vice president thrice from the then Jagannath College (now, Jagannath University) in 1967, 1968, and 1969. He also was elected as vice president of City Law College twice. Mr. Rashid participated in the 1971 Liberation War and hence is a valiant freedom fighter. He acted in the film "Ora Egarojon" in English it is titled "War Of Eleven Soldiers", which was the first cinema based on the Liberation War Of Bangladesh. He completed his M.A. and LL.B from Dhaka University and started his career as a lawyer in 1973. He was elected Senate Member of Dhaka University in 1978 and 1982.

He was the chairman of Dhaka Stock Exchange PLC from 1986 to 1988. He is a life member of Bangla Academy. He is the founder general secretary of the Parliament Members' Club of Bangladesh. He is the director in charge of Mohammedan Sporting Club Ltd. His father, the late Kazi Muzaffar Hussain, was the first Muslim lawyer of the then Gopalganj sub division and was the founder president of the then Gopalganj sub division Awami League.

== Early life ==
Rashid was born on 2 February 1947. He completed a B.A., M.A., and an LLB. His father, Kazi Mozaffar Hossain, was the founder of Awami League in Gopalganj.

== Career ==
Rashid was first elected to parliament from Gopalganj-3 in 1986 and 1988. He again got elected in 2014 and also in 2018 from Dhaka-6 in Bangladesh General Elections as a candidate of the Jatiya Party (Ershad). He was a minister during the government of Hussein Muhammad Ershad. In parliament he criticised Prime Minister Sheikh Hasina for making Hasanul Haq Inu a government minister. He is the president of the Bangladesh Surfing Association. He served as the president of the Bangladesh Cinema Halls Owners Association.

=== Corruption ===
On 6 April 2016, Anti-Corruption Commission sued Rashid for grabbing the land of diplomat Mohammed Ali in Dhanmondi in 1979.
