= Manjurul Islam Liton =

Bangladeshi politician

- মঞ্জুরুল ইসলাম লিটন
- Liton

Member of Parliament for Gaibandha-1
- In office 29 January 2014 – 31 December 2016
- Preceded by: Abdul Kader Khan
- Succeeded by: Golam Mostafa Ahmed

Personal details
- Born: c. 1968
- Died: 31 December 2016 (aged 48); Rangpur City, Bangladesh
- Political party: Bangladesh Awami League

Manjurul Islam Liton (c. 1968 – 31 December 2016) was a Bangladesh Awami League politician and a member of parliament from the Gaibandha-1 constituency.

== Early life and career ==
Liton was a marine engineer by training. He was a director of Ashraf Ali Cold Storage Limited and proprietor of Islam Ship Builders & Heavy Engineering.

=== Arrest ===
On 15 October 2015, Liton was arrested from Dhaka's Uttara area, after the Supreme Court cleared the way for his arrest in two cases filed for shooting a 10-year-old boy and vandalizing a house in Gaibandha. Witnesses allege that on 2 October, Liton shot 10 year old shot Sourav Mia in both legs when he was taking a morning walk with his uncle at Gopalcharan village in Gaibandha. Liton was travelling in his car when gestured for Sourav Mia's uncle, Shahjahan to come near him. Scared, Shahjahan started running away. This prompted the enraged Liton to fire his personal gun. Two bullets tore through Sourav's right leg and one through the left. Sourav's father Saju Mia also alleged that Liton also tried to prevent them from taking his critically wounded son to Rangpur Medical College Hospital. The following day, the victim's father filed a case with Sundarganj Police Station, accusing Liton of attempted murder.

The other case was filed on 6 October against Liton and nine of "his men" on charges of vandalising a house and looting furniture and corrugated iron sheets from its roof in a Gaibandha village soon after the shooting. The incident triggered a furore in Liton's constituency with residents calling for the cancellation of his parliament membership. Responding to reporters' questions, Home Minister Asaduzzamnan Khan said: "No one is above the law... The administration will now take action against the MP in accordance with the court instructions," and assured the judiciary in support for the case.

== Death ==
Liton was in his home in Sundarganj Upazila in Gaibandha when he was shot by three people on 31 December 2016. He died in Rangpur Medical College Hospital. The motive for the attack was suspected to be either an attack from militant groups, political rivalry, family foes or the recent zila parishad elections. In February 2017, another former Jatiya Sangsad member from the same constituency, Abdul Kader Khan, confessed to the killing.
