= Abdul Jalil (politician) =

Bangladesh politician (1939–2013)

- আব্দুল জলিল
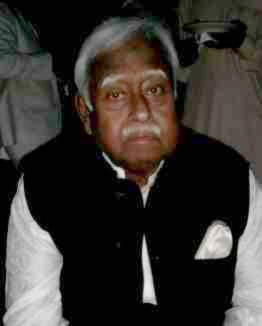

Member of Parliament from Naogaon-5
- In office 7 May 1986 – 1988
- Succeeded by: Abdul Hai
- In office 1 October 2001 – 29 October 2006
- Preceded by: Shamsuddin Ahmed
- Succeeded by: Himself
- In office 29 December 2008 – 6 March 2013
- Preceded by: Himself
- Succeeded by: Md. Abdul Maleque

9th General Secretary of Bangladesh Awami League
- In office 13 May 2002 – 6 January 2009
- President: Sheikh Hasina
- Preceded by: Zillur Rahman
- Succeeded by: Sayed Ashraful Islam

Personal details
- Born: Mohammad Abdul Jalil; 21 January 1939 Naogaon, British India
- Died: 6 March 2013 (aged 74) Singapore
- Party: Bangladesh Awami League
- Education: University of Dhaka
- Occupation: Politician

Mohammad Abdul Jalil (Bengali: মোহাম্মদ আব্দুল জলিল; 21 January 1939 – 6 March 2013) was a Bangladeshi politician. At the time of his death, he was a member of parliament for the Naogaon-5 constituency.

== Early life ==
Jalil was born on 21 January 1939 in Naogaon, East Bengal, British India. His family was involved in the jute trade. In 1960, he received admission at the University of Dhaka and graduated with a B.A. in political science. The next year he received his master's degree from the same university.

== Career ==
Jalil was a former minister of Bangladesh Government, a member of the Central Committee of Bangladesh Awami League and a member of the advisors council of Bangladesh Awami League. He was the founding chairman of Mercantile Bank Limited. He expressed his satisfaction at the achievement of the bank during 2002 and advised the executives and officers to come forward with new banking products and innovative ideas.

Jalil served as the commerce minister as a technocrat in the First Sheikh Hasina Cabinet. On 15 January 2000, he instructed the Bangladesh Tariff Commission to find ways through which the current tariff structure can be changed to encourage entrepreneurship.

From 2002 to 2009, Jalil served as the general secretary of the Awami League. In 2006, he met with Abdul Mannan Bhuiyan, Secretary General of Bangladesh Nationalist Party, to overcome the political impasse over the next national election.

On 28 May 2007, Jalil was arrested from headquarters of Mercantile Bank during the 2006-2008 Bangladeshi political crises. His health deteriorated in custody and the Awami League called for his release on health grounds. On 4 June 2007, he was admitted to Bangabandhu Sheikh Mujib Medical University. His condition worsened and he was shifted to Labaid Cardiac Hospital. On 18 December 2007, Bangladesh Anti-Corruption Commission sued him with Ramna Police Station. He had been after six months in detention. In July 2007, he criticised Sheikh Hasina, the chairperson of Awami League and former prime minister of Bangladesh, and due to that he was replaced by Syed Ashraful Islam as acting general secretary. In 2008, he was sent to Singapore on parole for treatment. He had been suffering from heart and kidney disease.

On 1 September 2008, Jalil returned to Bangladesh from Singapore following his treatment. During his detention he was unable to work as the general secretary of the Awami League and Joint General Secretary Syed Ashraful Islam became the acting general secretary. Following advice from Sheikh Hasina, Jalil decided to take a break from politics in September 2008.

On 30 January 2009, Jalil stated in the Jatiya Sangshad that he was tortured by intelligence agents during the Bangladesh political crises under the caretaker government rule. He said that he was tortured for five days straight and that agents of Directorate General of Forces Intelligence recorded his forced confessions. They release those recording to create a distance between him and Prime Minister Sheikh Hasina. He called for an investigation of the torture allegations and called for a law that limits the jurisdiction of intelligence agencies to military matters only. In April 2009, he was elected chairman of Mercantile Bank Limited. On 17 April 2009, he bail in the Bangladesh Anti-Corruption Commission case was extended by Bangladesh High Court.

The Daily Star described his permanent replacement in 2009 as "unceremonious". He was not allowed to carry out his duties as general secretary and Syed Ashraful Islam had all but replaced him. Jalil complained about his treatment and said the constitution of Awami League was being violated.

In September 2009, while in London, he criticised Awami League chief Sheikh Hasina. In London, during an interview with Bangla TV, he said the Awami League government had come to power through "an understanding". He was criticised by Awami League for his remarks but was welcomed by Bangladesh Nationalist Party. He was removed from the House petition committee of the Jatiya Sangshad. He had also reported that Cabinet Ministers were maintaining close contact with Directorate General of Forces Intelligence. He was an advisory council member of Awami League. He had blamed his statements on mental trauma from being tortured.

On 16 June 2010, he was discharged from the tax evasion case filed by National Board of Revenue on 15 October 2009 alleging he had dodged four hundred thousand taka income tax.

== Death and legacy ==
Jalil went to Singapore on 25 February 2013 for treatment. He died on 6 March 2013 in Mount Elizabeth Hospital, Singapore. Mercantile Bank provides the Mercantile Bank-Abdul Jalil Education Scholarship which is named after him to school students in Bangladesh. He was buried in Naogaon.

In 2018, Jalil's son, Nizam Uddin Jalil John, was elected member of parliament from his former constituency, Naogaon-5.
