= Abdul Hai (Bangladeshi politician) =

Bangladeshi politician

- আব্দুল হাই

Member of Parliament for Naogaon-5
- In office 1988–1990
- Preceded by: Abdul Jalil
- Succeeded by: Shamsuddin Ahmed

Personal details
- Born: Naogaon District
- Party: Jatiya Party

Abdul Hai is a politician of Naogaon District of Bangladesh and a former member of parliament for the Naogaon-5 constituency in 1988.

== Career ==
Abdul Hai was elected to parliament from Naogaon-5 as an independent candidate in 1988. He was defeated in the 5th Jatiya Sangsad elections on 1991 as a candidate of Jatiya Party from Naogaon-5 constituency.
