= Md. Zahidul Islam Dhalu =

Bangladeshi politician

- মোঃ জাহিদুল ইসলাম ধলু

Member of Parliament
- Incumbent
- Assumed office 17 February 2026
- Preceded by: Nizam Uddin Jalil John
- Constituency: Naogaon-5

Personal details
- Born: 28 March 1963 (age 63) Par Naogaon Eidgah Para, Naogaon Sadar Upazila, Naogaon District
- Party: Bangladesh Nationalist Party

Md. Zahidul Islam Dhalu is a Bangladeshi politician of the Bangladesh Nationalist Party. He is currently serving as a member of parliament from Naogaon-5.

== Early life ==
Dhalu was born on 28 March 1963 in Naogaon Sadar Upazila in Naogaon District.
