= Shafiqul Islam (Kishoreganj politician) =

Bangladeshi politician

- শফিকুল ইসলাম
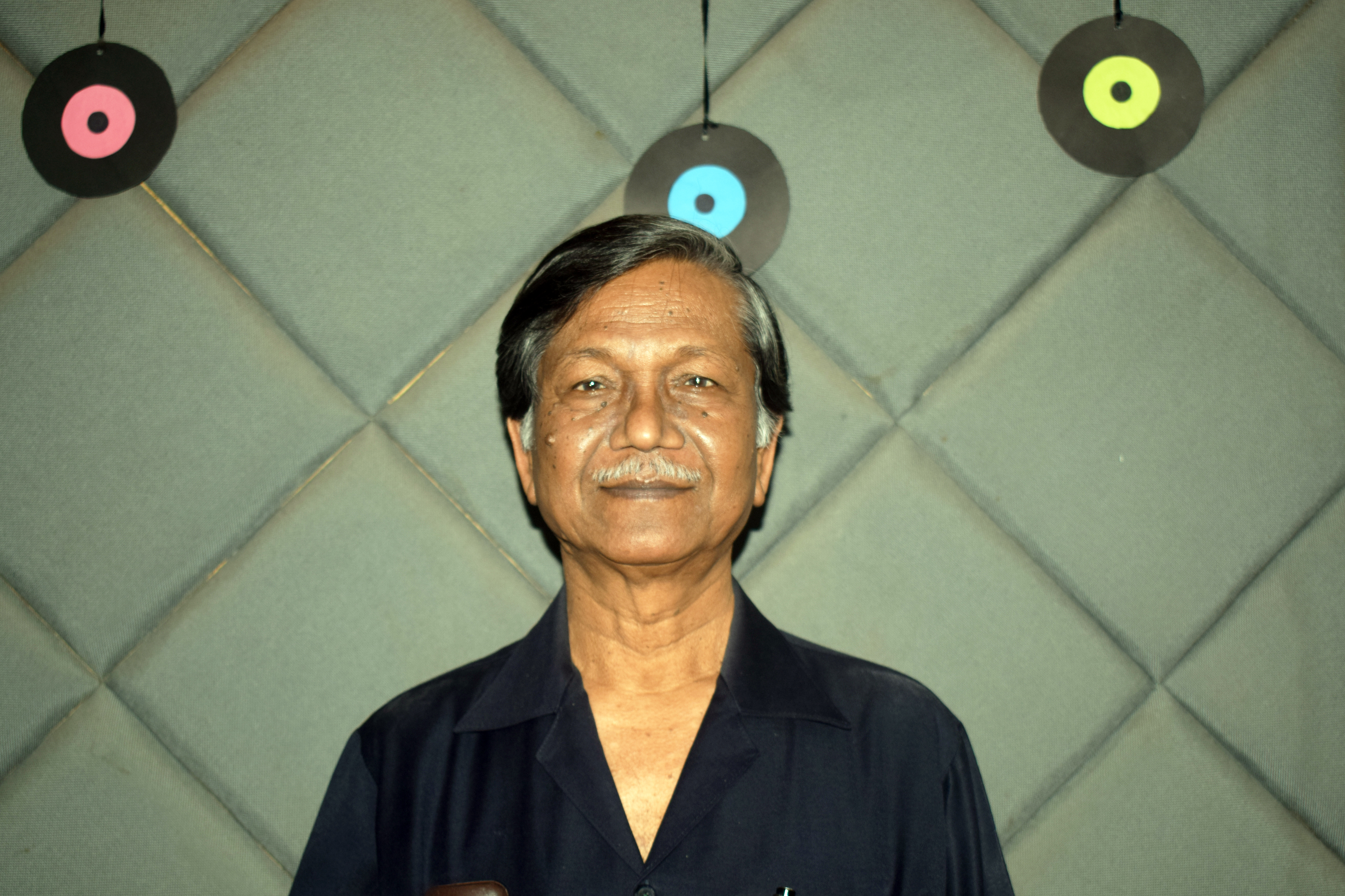
- Shafiqul Islam

Member of Parliament for Kishoreganj-7
- In office 15 February 1996 – 12 June 1996
- Preceded by: Abdul Latif Bhuiyan
- Succeeded by: Zillur Rahman

Personal details
- Born: Kishoreganj
- Party: Bangladesh Nationalist Party

Shafiqul Islam is a politician from Kishoreganj District of Bangladesh. He was elected a member of parliament from Kishoreganj-7 in February 1996.

== Career ==
Shafiqul Islam was elected a member of parliament from the Kishoreganj-7 constituency as a Bangladesh Nationalist Party candidate in the sixth parliamentary election on 15 February 1996.
