= Kishoreganj-7 =

Constituency of Bangladesh's Jatiya Sangsad

- Former constituency for the Jatiya Sangsad
- District: Kishoreganj District
- Division: Dhaka Division

Former constituency
- Created: 1984
- Abolished: 2006

Kishoreganj-7 is a defunct constituency represented in the Jatiya Sangsad (National Parliament) of Bangladesh abolished in 2006.

== Boundaries ==
As of 1995, the constituency encompassed Bhairab and Kuliarchar thanas.

== Members of Parliament ==
Election	Member	Party
1986	Zillur Rahman	Awami League
1988	Abu Bakr Siddique	Jatiya Party
1991	Abdul Latif Bhuiyan	Bangladesh Nationalist Party
February 1996	Shafiqul Islam	Bangladesh Nationalist Party
June 1996	Zillur Rahman	Awami League
Abolished constituency
