= Abdullah Nahid Niger =

Bangladeshi politician

- আব্দুল্লাহ নাহিদ নিগার

Member of the Bangladesh Parliament for Gaibandha-1
- In office 10 January 2024 – 6 August 2024
- Preceded by: Shamim Haider Patwary
- Succeeded by: Md Mazedur Rahman

Personal details
- Born: 29 July 1981 (age 45)

Abdullah Nahid Niger (born 29 July 1981) is a Bangladeshi politician and is a former Jatiya Sangsad member representing the Gaibandha-1 constituency in 2024.

Niger completed her MS in economics and finance from the Newcastle University upon Tyne, UK. She graduated in computer science and engineering from the University of Waterloo in Canada. Her mother, Afruza Bari, is the president of Sundarganj Upazila Awami League, and her father, Dr. Abdullahel Bari, is an industrialist. Her husband Dr. Tariqul Islam is a naval architect and marine engineer by education, and businessman by profession.
