= Mrinal Kanti Das =

Bangladeshi politician

- মৃনাল কান্তি দাস
- Young Mrinal Kanti Das in 1987

Member of Parliament
- In office 5 January 2014 – 9 January 2024
- Preceded by: M. Idris Ali
- Succeeded by: Mohammad Faisal Biplob
- Constituency: Munshiganj-3

Personal details
- Born: 25 January 1959 (age 67) Munshiganj, East Pakistan
- Party: Bangladesh Awami League
- Education: B.A, L.L.B
- Occupation: Lawyer

Mrinal Kanti Das (born 25 January 1959) is a Bangladesh Awami League politician and was a member of parliament for Munshiganj-3. In the 12th national election, he lost against Hazi Muhammad Faisal in Munsiganj-3.

== Early life ==
Das was born on 25 January 1959. He has a B.A. and an L.L.B. and practised law.

== Career ==
Das served as the deputy publicity secretary of the Bangladesh Awami League in 2010. He was elected to parliament on 5 January 2014 from the Bangladesh Awami League. He served as the deputy office secretary of the Bangladesh Awami League.
