= Mohammad Faisal Biplob =

Bangladeshi politician

- মোহাম্মদ ফয়সাল বিপ্লব

Member of Parliament for Munshiganj-3
- In office 30 January 2024 – 6 August 2024
- Preceded by: Mrinal Kanti Das

Personal details
- Born: 11 March 1971 (age 55) Munshiganj, East Pakistan, Pakistan
- Party: Bangladesh Awami League
- Spouse: Chowdhury Faria Afrin
- Parents: Mohammad Mohiuddin (father); Begum Fazilatun Nessa (mother)
- Occupation: Politician

Mohammad Faisal Biplob (born 11 March 1971) is a Bangladeshi politician. He is a former Jatiya Sangsad member representing the Munshiganj-3 constituency.

== Early life ==
Mohammad Faisal Biplob was born in Munshiganj. His father, Mohammad Mohiuddin, is the president of the Munshiganj district Awami League and the chairman of the Munshiganj district council. His mother is Begum Fazilatun Nessa. His wife is Chowdhury Faria Afrin, first woman to be elected mayor of Munshiganj.

== Career ==
Biplob was the mayor of Munshiganj municipality. He was nominated as a member of parliament as a candidate of Independent from Munshiganj-3 constituency in 2024 twelfth national parliament election.

Biplob was detained in June 2025 after the fall of the Sheikh Hasina led Awami League government.
