= Gaibandha-1 =

Constituency of Bangladesh's Jatiya Sangsad

Coordinates: 25.57°N 89.52°E

- Constituency for the Jatiya Sangsad
- District: Gaibandha District
- Division: Rangpur Division
- Electorate: 419,111 (2026)

Current constituency
- Created: 1984
- Party: Bangladesh Jamaat-e-Islami
- Member: Md Mazedur Rahman
- ← 28 Kurigram-4 30 Gaibandha-2 →

Gaibandha-1 is a constituency represented in the Jatiya Sangsad (National Parliament) of Bangladesh since 2026 by Md Mazedur Rahman of the Bangladesh Jamaat-e-Islami.

== Boundaries ==
The constituency encompasses Sundarganj Upazila.

== History ==
The constituency was created in 1984 from a Rangpur constituency when the former Rangpur District was split into five districts: Nilphamari, Lalmonirhat, Rangpur, Kurigram, and Gaibandha.

== Members of Parliament ==
Election	Member	Party
1986	Hafizur Rahman Pramanik	Jatiya Party
Jun 1996	Md. Waheduzzaman Sarkar	Jatiya Party
2001	Abdul Aziz Mia	Bangladesh Jamaat-e-Islami
2008	Abdul Kader Khan	Jatiya Party (Ershad)
2014	Manjurul Islam Liton	Awami League
2017 by-election	Golam Mostafa Ahmed	Awami League
2018 by-election	Shamim Haider Patwary	Jatiya Party (Ershad)
2024	Abdullah Nahid Nigar	Independent
2026	Md Mazedur Rahman	Bangladesh Jamaat-e-Islami

== Elections ==
=== Elections in the 2020s ===
General Election 2026: Gaibandha-1
Party	Candidate	Votes	%	±%
Jamaat	Md Mazedur Rahman	140,726	57.9	N/A
BNP	Khandaker Ziaul Islam Mohammad Ali	37,997	15.6	N/A
JP(E)	Shamim Haider Patwary	33,976	14.0	N/A
Independent	Md. Mustafa Mohsin	27,140	11.2	N/A
IAB	Md. Ramzan Ali	2,064	0.8	N/A
BSD (Marxist)	Paramananda Das	399	0.2	N/A
Independent	Mosha Salma Akhter	378	0.2	N/A
Amjanatar Dol	Md. Kawsar Azam Hannu	174	0.1	N/A
Majority		102,729	42.3	N/A
Turnout		242,854	57.9	N/A
Jamaat gain from Independent				

=== Elections in the 2010s ===
Golam Mostafa Ahmed died in December 2017. Shamim Haider Patwary of the Jatiya Party (Ershad) was elected in a March 2018 by-election.

Gaibandha-1 by-election, March 2018
Party	Candidate	Votes	%	±%
JP(E)	Shamim Haider Patwary	78,926	53.0	
AL	Afroza Bari	68,913	46.3	
Gano Front	Shariful Islam	676	0.5	
NPP	Zia Zaman Khan	399	0.3	
Majority		10,013	6.7	
Turnout		148,914	44.0	
JP(E) gain from AL				

Manjurul Islam Liton was murdered in December 2016. Golam Mostafa Ahmed of the Awami League was elected in a March 2017 by-election. He defeated Jatiya Party (Ershad) candidate Shamim Haider Patwary, Jatiya Party (Monju) candidate Waheduzzaman, and four other contenders.

General Election 2014: Gaibandha-1
Party	Candidate	Votes	%	±%
AL	Manjurul Islam Liton	118,152	88.6	N/A
JP(E)	Abdul Kader Khan	13,044	9.8	−58.6
Jatiya Party (M)	Mosammat Rezia Begum	1,023	0.8	N/A
Independent	Md. Sohel Rana Sona	651	0.5	N/A
Independent	Syeda Khurshid Jahan	484	0.4	N/A
Majority		105,108	78.8	+41.2
Turnout		133,354	44.0	−43.3
AL gain from JP(E)				

=== Elections in the 2000s ===
General Election 2008: Gaibandha-1
Party	Candidate	Votes	%	±%
JP(E)	Abdul Kader Khan	160,008	68.4	N/A
Jamaat	Abdul Aziz Mia	72,093	30.8	−10.1
JSD (Rab)	Brien Chandro Shil	1,416	0.6	N/A
KSJL	Abdul Majid	369	0.2	+0.1
Majority		87,915	37.6	+27.6
Turnout		233,886	87.3	+16.4
JP(E) gain from Jamaat				

General Election 2001: Gaibandha-1
Party	Candidate	Votes	%	±%
Jamaat	Abdul Aziz Mia	75,478	40.9	+11.5
IJOF	Md. Waheduzzaman Sarkar	57,048	30.9	N/A
AL	Syed Abul Hossain (Khaja)	46,089	25.0	+3.1
Jatiya Party (M)	Hafizur Rahman Pramanik	3,323	1.8	N/A
JSD	Md. Ahsan Habib Masud	799	0.4	N/A
CPB	Biren Sarkar	610	0.3	−0.1
WPB	Sadekul Islam Dulal	365	0.2	0.0
BKA	Md. Hafizur Rahman Sarder	219	0.1	0.0
KSJL	Abdul Majid	169	0.1	N/A
Independent	Md. Mosaddek Hossain Khan	130	0.1	−0.3
Ganatantri Party	ABM Shariatullah	82	0.0	N/A
Independent	Manjurul Islam Liton	23	0.0	N/A
Majority		18,430	10.0	−4.8
Turnout		184,335	70.9	+3.5
Jamaat gain from JP(E)				

=== Elections in the 1990s ===
General Election June 1996: Gaibandha-1
Party	Candidate	Votes	%	±%
JP(E)	Md. Waheduzzaman Sarkar	57,318	44.2	+16.7
Jamaat	Abdul Aziz Mia	38,145	29.4	+7.7
AL	Md. Moslem Ali Miah	28,374	21.9	+3.1
BNP	Md. Jakaria Hossain Khandader	2,914	2.2	−2.2
IOJ	Md. Kazi Moslem Ali	700	0.5	−2.1
Independent	Md. Mosaddek Hossain Khan	543	0.4	−2.4
CPB	Md. Nur E Alam Manik	507	0.4	N/A
Gano Forum	Md. Abul Kashem	460	0.4	N/A
Zaker Party	Md. Abdul Awal Miah	286	0.2	−0.5
WPB	Sadekul Islam Dulal	208	0.2	−0.4
BKA	Md. Hafijur Rahman	109	0.1	N/A
Majority		19,173	14.8	+9.0
Turnout		129,564	67.4	+21.1
JP(E) hold				

General Election 1991: Gaibandha-1
Party	Candidate	Votes	%	±%
JP(E)	Hafizur Rahman Pramanik	28,776	27.5	
Jamaat	Abdul Aziz Mia	22,732	21.7	
AL	Golam Mustafa Ahmed	19,660	18.8	
Jatiya Janata Party and Gonotantrik Oikkya Jot	Md. Syed Abul Hossain Khwaza	10,128	9.7	
Independent	Abdus Sattar Sarkar	5,466	5.2	
BNP	Md. Jahangir Alam	4,616	4.4	
Bangladesh Janata Party	Abdul Hai Mondol	4,439	4.2	
Independent	Md. Mosaddek Hossain Khan	2,967	2.8	
IOJ	Md. Kazi Moslem Ali	2,714	2.6	
Bangladesh Muslim League (Kader)	Md. Moshihor Rahman	1,625	1.6	
Zaker Party	Md. M. A. Awal	727	0.7	
WPB	Sadekul Islam Dulal	627	0.6	
Independent	Azgar Ali Khan	250	0.2	
Majority		6,044	5.8	
Turnout		104,727	46.3	
JP(E) hold				
