= Sultan Uddin Bhuiyan =

Bangladeshi politician (1951–2020)

- সুলতান উদ্দিন ভূঁইয়া

Member of Parliament for Narayanganj-1
- In office 1986–1990
- Succeeded by: Abdul Matin Chowdhury

Personal details
- Died: 13 June 2020 (Age 67-71) United Hospital, Dhaka
- Party: Jatiya Party
- Children: One son, two daughters

Sultan Uddin Bhuiyan (died 13 June 2020) was a politician from the Narayanganj District of Bangladesh and an elected a member of parliament from Narayanganj-1.

== Early life ==
He is the fourth son of industrialist Gul Baksh Bhuiyan.

== Career ==
Bhuiyan was the leader of the Chhatra League at the beginning of his political life. He was elected to parliament from Narayanganj-1 as a Jatiya Party candidate in the 1986 and 1988 Bangladeshi general elections.

Bhuiyan was president of the Bangladesh Yarn Merchant Association, president of the Narayanganj Chamber of Commerce and Industries, and president of the Narayanganj Club Ltd.

== Death ==
Sultan Uddin Bhuiyan died on 13 June 2020 while undergoing treatment at United Hospital, Dhaka.
