= Dhaka-6 =

Constituency of Bangladesh's Jatiya Sangsad

Coordinates: 23.71°N 90.42°E

- Constituency for the Jatiya Sangsad
- District: Dhaka District
- Division: Dhaka Division
- Electorate: 292,283 (2026)

Current constituency
- Created: 1973
- Party: Bangladesh Nationalist Party
- Member: Ishraque Hossain
- ← 178 Dhaka-5 180 Dhaka-7 →

Dhaka-6 is a constituency represented in the Jatiya Sangsad (National Parliament) of Bangladesh since 2026 by Ishraque Hossain of the Bangladesh Nationalist Party.

== Boundaries ==
The constituency encompasses Dhaka South City Corporation wards 34 and 37 through 46.

== History ==
The constituency was created for the first general elections in newly independent Bangladesh, held in 1973.

Ahead of the 2008 general election, the Bangladesh Election Commission redrew constituency boundaries to reflect population changes revealed by the 2001 Bangladesh census. The 2008 redistricting added 7 new seats to the Dhaka metropolitan area, increasing the number of constituencies in the capital from 8 to 15, and reducing the extent of the constituency.

The seat became vacant upon the death of the sitting MP Mizanur Rahman Khan Dipu on 21 December 2013. It was filled in the 2014 general election two weeks later.

In the 2018 general election, the constituency was one of six chosen by lottery to use electronic voting machines.

== Members of Parliament ==
Election	Member	Party
1973	Korban Ali	Awami League
1979	A. Q. M. Badruddoza Chowdhury	Bangladesh Nationalist Party
Major Boundary Changes
1986	Abdur Rahim	Jatiya Party
1991	Mirza Abbas	Bangladesh Nationalist Party
Feb 1996	Mirza Abbas	Bangladesh Nationalist Party
Jun 1996	Saber Hossain Chowdhury	Awami League
2001	Mirza Abbas	Bangladesh Nationalist Party
Major Boundary Changes
2008	Mizanur Rahman Khan Dipu	Awami League
2014	Kazi Firoz Rashid	Jatiya Party (Ershad)
2024	Sayeed Kohkon	Awami League
2026	Ishraque Hossain	Bangladesh Nationalist Party

== Elections ==
=== Elections in the 2020s ===
General Election 2026: Dhaka-6
Party	Candidate	Votes	%	±%
BNP	Ishraque Hossain	78,850	57.5	N/A
Jamaat	Md. Abdul Mannan	55,697	40.6	N/A
JP(E)	Amir Uddin Ahammed	1,778	1.3	N/A
BCP	Md. Younus Ali Akando	319	0.2	N/A
BML	Md. Akter Hossen	245	0.2	N/A
Gano Front	Ahammad Ali Shek	152	0.1	N/A
GOP	Md. Fakrul Islam	138	0.1	N/A
Majority		23,153	16.9	N/A
Turnout		137,179	46.9	N/A
Registered electors		292,283		
BNP gain from AL				

=== Elections in the 2010s ===
General Election 2014: Dhaka-6
Party	Candidate	Votes	%	±%
JP(E)	Kazi Firoz Rashid	45,391	84.4	N/A
Independent	Saidur Rahman Sahid	7,259	13.5	N/A
AL	Md. Akhtar Hossain	1,111	2.1	−54.2
Majority		38,132	70.9	+53.9
Turnout		53,761	21.7	−60.3
JP(E) gain from AL				

=== Elections in the 2000s ===
General Election 2008: Dhaka-6
Party	Candidate	Votes	%	±%
AL	Mizanur Rahman Khan Dipu	103,737	56.3	+14.9
BNP	Sadeque Hossain Khoka	72,456	39.3	−16.1
BDB	A. Q. M. Badruddoza Chowdhury	5,215	2.8	N/A
IAB	Manowar Khan	2,185	1.2	N/A
KSJL	Shamsher Ali Talukder	381	0.2	N/A
BTF	M. Ahsan Atik	236	0.1	N/A
Majority		31,281	17.0	+3.1
Turnout		184,210	82.0	+21.9
AL gain from BNP				

General Election 2001: Dhaka-6
Party	Candidate	Votes	%	±%
BNP	Mirza Abbas	156,358	55.4	+14.1
AL	Saber Hossain Chowdhury	116,976	41.4	−3.9
IJOF	Md. Khalequzzaman Chowdhury	7,052	2.5	N/A
BKA	Muhammad Zafrullah Khan	436	0.2	+0.1
Gano Forum	Julekha Haq	219	0.1	−0.1
Independent	Mohammad Iqbal	191	0.1	N/A
Independent	Anisul Haque	163	0.1	N/A
Independent	Khandokar Saiful Islam	124	0.0	N/A
Independent	Lutful Haider Habib Khan	115	0.0	N/A
Independent	Md. Shahin	84	0.0	N/A
Independent	Md. Zinnat Ali	79	0.0	N/A
Independent	Md. Majibur Rahman	76	0.0	N/A
JSD	Md. Shahjahan Saju	75	0.0	N/A
Jatiya Party (M)	Khandokar Mahatab Uddin	57	0.0	N/A
Independent	Sale Mohammad	46	0.0	N/A
Independent	Md. Refatullah Bakul	40	0.0	N/A
Independent	Md. Jahangir Alam Babu	39	0.0	N/A
BAKSAL	Md. Joynal Abedin	37	0.0	N/A
Independent	Abdul Latif Mamun	35	0.0	N/A
Independent	M. Iqbal Kabir	35	0.0	N/A
Liberal Party Bangladesh	Afzalul Haq Sikder	34	0.0	N/A
BKSMA (Sadeq)	Krishak Md. Sadeq	34	0.0	N/A
Bangladesh People's Congress	M. A. Latif Majumder	28	0.0	N/A
Independent	M. A. Jabbar	21	0.0	N/A
Majority		39,382	13.9	+10.0
Turnout		282,354	60.1	−6.9
BNP gain from AL				

=== Elections in the 1990s ===
General Election June 1996: Dhaka-6
Party	Candidate	Votes	%	±%
AL	Saber Hossain Chowdhury	104,694	45.3	+14.0
BNP	Mirza Abbas	95,673	41.3	−13.6
JP(E)	Abdus Salam	18,797	8.1	+6.2
Jamaat	Ahmedullah Bhiuyan	6,977	3.0	N/A
IOJ	Abdul Aziz	1,584	0.7	N/A
Zaker Party	Md. Nurul Haq Ponir	1,453	0.6	N/A
Gano Forum	Saifuddin Ahmed Manik	388	0.2	N/A
JSD (Rab)	Md. Zahurul Haque	319	0.1	0.0
FP	Sirajul Haque Gora	250	0.1	N/A
WPB	Abul Bashar	242	0.1	N/A
BKA	Muhammad Zafrullah Khan	232	0.1	N/A
Independent	Tanvir Haider	138	0.1	N/A
Independent	A. B. M. Habibur Rahman	132	0.1	N/A
BIF	Sa. U. Md. Abdus Sattar	112	0.1	+0.1
Ganatantrik Sarbahara Party	Sheikh Mohiuddin Ahmed	70	0.0	N/A
Progotishil Jatiatabadi Dal (Nurul A Moula)	Nurul Amin Sarker	51	0.0	N/A
Samridhya Bangladesh Babosai Samproday	Mizan Uddin Ahmed Chowdhury	48	0.0	N/A
NAP Bhashani (Mustaq)	Md. Saiful Islam	42	0.0	N/A
NAP	Md. Nurul Alam	31	0.0	N/A
UPP	Md. Mofazzal Hossain Kabir	26	0.0	N/A
NAP (Bhashani)	Nazrul Islam	22	0.0	N/A
BKSMA	Krishok Md. Sadik	20	0.0	N/A
Independent	A. K. M. Shajahan	16	0.0	N/A
Majority		9,021	3.9	−19.7
Turnout		231,317	67.0	+16.0
AL gain from BNP				

General Election 1991: Dhaka-6
Party	Candidate	Votes	%	±%
BNP	Mirza Abbas	59,851	54.9	
AL	Mozaffar Hossain Paltu	34,101	31.3	
Jamaat	Abbas Ali Khan	10,104	9.3	
JP(E)	Delwar Hossain Khan	2,046	1.9	
JP(E)	Md. Nurul Huq	1,650	1.5	
Bangladesh Janata Party	Shah Md. Mohsin	452	0.4	
FP	Md. Faruk	194	0.2	
JSD (Rab)	Mosharaf Hossain	139	0.1	
Bangladesh Samajtantrik Dal (Mahbub)	AFM Mahbubul Haque	99	0.1	
Janata Mukti Party	Golam Moinuddin Gaus	66	0.1	
Independent	Sajan Muhammad	52	0.1	
Bangladesh Muslim League (Yusuf)	Md. Zinnat Ali	42	0.0	
Jatiya Jukta Front	Asadul Kabir	34	0.0	
JSD (S)	Ahsan Haider	28	0.0	
Bangladesh Inquilab Party	Gazi Rabiul Islam Shagor	26	0.0	
BAKSAL	Hashim Uddin Haider Pahari	25	0.0	
Dhumpan O MAdokdrobba Nibaronkari Manabsheba Schansta	Kh. Sulaman Ahmed Kamal	23	0.0	
Independent	A. F. Ruhullah Hasan	21	0.0	
Jatiyatabadi Gonotantrik Chashi Dal	A. B. M. Giasuddin Raffel	19	0.0	
Independent	Mahbubur Rahman	19	0.0	
Jatia Mukti Dal	Noor Mohammad Khan	18	0.0	
Bangladesh Manobatabadi Dal	Md. Shahbuddin Patawari	17	0.0	
Bangladesh People's League (Garib A Nawaz)	Md. Shajahan Bhuiyan	16	0.0	
BIF	Dealawar Hossain Bhuiyan	15	0.0	
Jatiya Janata Party (Asad)	Md. Afzalul Huq Afzal	9	0.0	
Independent	Sayed Sharafat Hossain	8	0.0	
Majority		25,750	23.6	
Turnout		109,074	51.0	
BNP gain from JP(E)				

=== Elections in the 1970s ===
General Election 1973: Dhaka-6
Party	Candidate	Votes	%	±%
AL	Korban Ali	80,016	94.39	N/A
National Awami Party (Muzzafar)	Sree Subodh Razario	2,141	2.53	N/A
National Awami Party (Bhasani)	Safiuddin Ahmed	1,510	1.78	N/A
Bangladesh Socialist Party	A. K. M Kamruzzaman	1,108	1.31	N/A
Majority		77,875	91.86	N/A
Turnout		84,775		N/A
AL gain from N/A				
