= Mizanur Rahman Khan Dipu =

Bangladeshi politician

Member of Parliament

Personal details
- Born: 6 November 1964; Kulutola, Old Dhaka, East Pakistan
- Died: 21 December 2013; Apollo Hospital Dhaka
- Political party: Bangladesh Awami League

Mizanur Rahman Khan Dipu was a Bangladesh Awami League politician and the former Member of Parliament.

== Early life ==
Dipu was born on 6 November 1964 in Kulutola, Old Dhaka, East Pakistan.

== Career ==
Dipu was elected to parliament in 2008 from Dhaka-6 as a candidate of Bangladesh Awami League in the 10th General Election of Bangladesh. He defeated the Bangladesh Nationalist Party candidate Sadeque Hossain Khoka in the election.

== Death ==
Dipu died on 21 December 2013 in Apollo Hospital Dhaka, Bangladesh.
