= Abdul Kader Khan =

Bangladeshi politician

- আব্দুল কাদের খান

Member of the Bangladesh Parliament for Gaibandha-1
- In office 25 January 2009 – 24 January 2014
- Preceded by: Abdul Aziz
- Succeeded by: Manjurul Islam Liton

Personal details
- Born: 31 March 1952 (age 74) Rangpur, East Bengal, Pakistan
- Party: Jatiya Party

Military service
- Allegiance: Bangladesh
- Branch/service: Bangladesh Army
- Years of service: 1978-2005
- Rank: Colonel
- Unit: Army Medical Corps
- Commands: ADMS of 55th Infantry Division; Commandant of CMH, Bogra; CO of 15th Field Ambulance

Abdul Kader Khan (born 31 March 1952) is a Jatiya Party politician and a former Jatiya Sangsad member representing the Gaibandha-1 constituency. In June 2019, Khan was sentenced to life imprisonment for possessing a firearm and an additional 15 years for possessing ammunition.

== Career ==
Khan is a retired medical officer of the Bangladesh Army with the rank of colonel. He was elected to parliament from the Jatiya Party of the Grand Alliance in 2008, representing Gaibandha-1.

== Charges ==
On 21 February 2017, Khan was arrested at his house in Bogra in connection with the murder of Manjurul Islam Liton, the then incumbent Jatiya Sangsad member from the same constituency. Four days later, Khan confessed his involvement in the murder. He was sentenced to death on 28 November 2019.

On 26 May 2019, the Anti-Corruption Commission filed a case against Khan for amassing wealth beyond known sources of income. Relevant charges were pressed on 16 March 2021. On 4 April 2024, he was sentenced to four years in prison and fined Tk 61.92 lakh.
