= Abu Bakr Siddique (politician) =

Bangladeshi politician

- আবু বকর ছিদ্দিক

Member of Parliament for Kishoreganj-7
- In office 3 March 1988 – 6 December 1990
- Preceded by: Zillur Rahman
- Succeeded by: Abdul Latif Bhuiyan

Personal details
- Born: Kishoreganj
- Party: Jatiya Party

Abu Bakr Siddique is a politician from Kishoreganj District of Bangladesh. He was elected a member of parliament from Kishoreganj-7 in the 1988 Bangladeshi general election.

== Career ==
Abu Bakr Siddique was elected a member of parliament from the Kishoreganj-7 constituency as an Jatiya Party candidate in the 1988 Bangladeshi general election.
