= Narayanganj-1 =

Constituency of Bangladesh's Jatiya Sangsad

- Constituency for the Jatiya Sangsad
- District: Narayanganj District
- Division: Dhaka Division
- Electorate: 408,829 (2026)

Current constituency
- Created: 1984
- Party: Bangladesh Nationalist Party
- Member: Mustafizur Rahman Bhuiyan Dipu
- ← 203 Narsingdi-5 205 Narayanganj-2 →

Narayanganj-1 is a constituency represented in the Jatiya Sangsad (National Parliament) of Bangladesh since 2026 by Mustafizur Rahman Bhuiyan Dipu of the Bangladesh Nationalist Party.

== Boundaries ==
The constituency encompasses Rupganj Upazila.

== History ==
The constituency was created in 1984 from a Dhaka constituency when the former Dhaka District was split into six districts: Manikganj, Munshiganj, Dhaka, Gazipur, Narsingdi, and Narayanganj.

== Members of Parliament ==
Election	Member	Party
1986	Sultan Uddin Bhuiyan	Jatiya Party
1988	Sultan Uddin Bhuiyan	Jatiya Party
1991	Abdul Matin Chowdhury	Bangladesh Nationalist Party
Feb 1996	Abdul Matin Chowdhury	Bangladesh Nationalist Party
Jun 1996	K. M. Shafiullah	Awami League
2001	Abdul Matin Chowdhury	Bangladesh Nationalist Party
2008	Golam Dastagir Gazi	Awami League
2014	Golam Dastagir Gazi	Awami League
2018	Golam Dastagir Gazi	Awami League
2024	Golam Dastagir Gazi	Awami League
2026	Mustafizur Rahman Bhuiyan Dipu	Bangladesh Nationalist Party

== Elections ==
=== Elections in the 2020s ===
General Election 2026: Narayanganj-1
Party	Candidate	Votes	%	±%
BNP	Mustafizur Rahman Bhuiyan Dipu	156,358	61.0	N/A
Jamaat	Md. Anwar Hossain Molla	91,690	35.8	N/A
IAB	Md. Imdadullah	7,186	2.8	N/A
Independent	Mohammad Dulal	463	0.2	N/A
CPB	Md. Moniruzzaman Chandan	261	0.1	N/A
GOP	Wasim Uddin	219	0.1	N/A
IBB	Md. Rehan Afzal	207	0.1	N/A
Majority		64,668	25.2	N/A
Turnout		256,384	62.7	N/A
Registered electors		408,829		
BNP gain from AL				

=== Elections in the 2010s ===
General Election 2014: Narayanganj-1
Party	Candidate	Votes	%	±%
AL	Golam Dastagir Gazi	145,350	95.7	+37.2
JP(E)	Md. Joynal Abedin Chowdury	6,063	4.0	N/A
Independent	Md. Showkat Ali	544	0.4	N/A
Majority		139,287	91.7	+33.2
Turnout		151,957	49.2	−39.9
AL hold				

=== Elections in the 2000s ===
General Election 2008: Narayanganj-1
Party	Candidate	Votes	%	±%
AL	Golam Dastagir Gazi	143,279	58.5	+13.0
BNP	Quazi Moniruzzaman	95,673	39.1	−12.3
IAB	Syed Ahammed	3,657	1.5	N/A
BTF	Md. Abdul Hai	947	0.4	N/A
Gano Forum	Md. Humayun Kabir Bachchu	655	0.3	N/A
BNAP	Mohammad Abdul Wahab Miah	245	0.1	N/A
BSD	Jahangir Alam	218	0.1	N/A
CPB	Elias Ahmed	210	0.1	N/A
NPP	Firoz Mahmud	80	0.0	N/A
Majority		47,606	19.4	+13.5
Turnout		244,964	89.1	+9.0
AL gain from BNP				

General Election 2001: Narayanganj-1
Party	Candidate	Votes	%	±%
BNP	Abdul Matin Chowdhury	89,136	51.4	+11.8
AL	K. M. Shafiullah	78,904	45.5	−2.1
IJOF	Mahmuda Hasan	3,365	1.9	N/A
NAP	M. A. Wahab	1,797	1.0	N/A
Jatiya Party (M)	Gazi Mostafa Kamal	82	0.0	N/A
National Awami Party (Bhashani-Mushtak)	Mostaq Ahmed	79	0.0	−0.7
Independent	Md. Mahbub Pradhan	34	0.0	N/A
Independent	Shakhawat Hossain	29	0.0	N/A
Majority		10,232	5.9	−2.1
Turnout		173,426	80.1	−1.2
BNP gain from AL				

=== Elections in the 1990s ===
General Election June 1996: Narayanganj-1
Party	Candidate	Votes	%	±%
AL	K. M. Shafiullah	64,878	47.6	+7.0
BNP	Abdul Matin Chowdhury	53,971	39.6	−6.5
JP(E)	Md. Obaidul Kabir Mintu	11,835	8.7	+2.4
Jamaat	Md. Anowar Hossain	2,556	1.9	−1.2
IOJ	Md. Habibur Rahman	2,016	1.5	N/A
Zaker Party	Dilip Kumar Chanda	944	0.7	−0.8
National Awami Party (Bhashani-Mushtak)	Mostaq Ahmed	96	0.7	N/A
Independent politician	Md. Mahabub Hossain Prodhan	48	0.0	N/A
Majority		10,907	8.0	+2.5
Turnout		136,344	81.3	+18.3
AL gain from BNP				

General Election 1991: Narayanganj-1
Party	Candidate	Votes	%	±%
BNP	Abdul Matin Chowdhury	60,532	46.1	
AL	Aktaruzzaman	53,361	40.6	
JP(E)	Sultan Uddin Bhuiyan	8,289	6.3	
Jamaat	Md. Abdul Kader	4,007	3.1	
Zaker Party	Sudhir Chandra Sarkar	1,954	1.5	
Bangladesh Janata Party	Shahidul Islam	1,640	1.2	
JSD	Shahjahan Bhuiya	565	0.4	
Independent	Md. Abdul Hannan	516	0.4	
Bangladesh Jatiya Tati Dal	Wahab Mahmud	337	0.3	
Jatiyatabadi Ganatantrik Dal	Pirzada Shah Deen Mohammad	121	0.1	
Majority		7,171	5.5	
Turnout		131,322	63.0	
BNP gain from JP(E)				
