= Munshiganj-3 =

Constituency of Bangladesh's Jatiya Sangsad

- Constituency for the Jatiya Sangsad
- District: Munshiganj District
- Division: Dhaka Division
- Electorate: 509,467 (2026)

Current constituency
- Created: 1984
- Party: Bangladesh Nationalist Party
- Member: Md. Quamruzzaman Ratan
- ← 172 Munshiganj-2 174 Dhaka-1 →

Munshiganj-3 is a constituency represented in the Jatiya Sangsad (National Parliament) of Bangladesh since 2026 by Md. Quamruzzaman Ratan of the Bangladesh Nationalist Party.

== Boundaries ==
The constituency encompasses Munshiganj Sadar and Gazaria upazilas.

== History ==
The constituency was created in 1984 from a Dhaka constituency when the former Dhaka District was split into six districts: Manikganj, Munshiganj, Dhaka, Gazipur, Narsingdi, and Narayanganj.

Ahead of the 2008 general election, the Election Commission redrew constituency boundaries to reflect population changes revealed by the 2001 Bangladesh census. The 2008 redistricting reduced the number of seats in the district from four to three, making each of the surviving three larger.

== Members of Parliament ==
| Election | Member | Party |
|---|---|---|
| 1986 | K.M. Aminul Islam | Jatiya Party |
| 1988 | Mohammad Jamal Hossain | Jatiya Party |
| 1991 | Shamsul Islam | Bangladesh Nationalist Party |
| Feb 1996 | Shamsul Islam | Bangladesh Nationalist Party |
| 2008 | M. Idris Ali | Awami League |
| 2014 | Mrinal Kanti Das | Awami League |
| 2024 by-election | Mohammad Faisal Biplob | Independent |
| 2026 | Md. Quamruzzaman Ratan | Bangladesh Nationalist Party |

== Elections ==
=== Elections in the 2020s ===
General Election 2026: Munshiganj-3
| Party | Candidate | Votes | % | ±% |
|---|---|---|---|---|
| BNP | Md. Quamruzzaman Ratan | 124,691 | 45.2 | N/A |
| Independent | Md. Mohiuddin | 88,936 | 32.2 | N/A |
| Bangladesh Khelafat Majlis | Nur Hossain Nurani | 54,456 | 19.7 | N/A |
| IAB | Suman Dewan | 6,392 | 2.3 | N/A |
| JP(E) | Md. Arifuzzaman | 804 | 0.3 | N/A |
| CPB | Sheikh Md. Kamal Hossain | 304 | 0.1 | N/A |
| Labour | Anis Molla | 294 | 0.1 | N/A |
| BRWP | Sheikh Md. Shimul | 174 | 0.1 | N/A |
| Majority | | 35,755 | 13.0 | N/A |
| Turnout | | 276,051 | 54.2 | N/A |
| Registered electors | | 509,467 | | |
| BNP gain from Independent | | | | |

=== Elections in the 2010s ===
Mrinal Kanti Das was elected unopposed in the 2014 general election after opposition parties withdrew their candidacies in a boycott of the election.

=== Elections in the 2000s ===
General Election 2008: Munshiganj-3
| Party | Candidate | Votes | % | ±% |
|---|---|---|---|---|
| AL | M. Idris Ali | 142,484 | 52.5 | +15.1 |
| BNP | Shamsul Islam | 119,940 | 44.2 | −18.1 |
| IAB | Md Omor Faruq Liton | 3,787 | 1.4 | N/A |
| JP(E) | Mujibur Rahman | 2,485 | 0.9 | N/A |
| Islamic Front | Liakot Ali Khan | 897 | 0.3 | N/A |
| PDP | Md Nurul Islam | 756 | 0.3 | N/A |
| BTF | Md Ibrahim Bepary | 294 | 0.1 | N/A |
| CPB | Sheikh Md Kamal Hossain | 203 | 0.1 | N/A |
| Jatiya Party (M) | Najmun Nahar Baby | 189 | 0.1 | 0.0 |
| JSD (Rab) | Mohammed Milton Hossain | 111 | 0.0 | N/A |
| Majority | | 22,544 | 8.3 | −16.6 |
| Turnout | | 272,169 | 85.4 | +14.2 |
| AL gain from BNP | | | | |

General Election 2001: Munshiganj-3
| Party | Candidate | Votes | % | ±% |
|---|---|---|---|---|
| BNP | Shamsul Islam | 86,077 | 62.3 | +2.7 |
| AL | Mahbub Uddin Ahmed | 51,682 | 37.4 | +7.4 |
| Jatiya Party (M) | Syed Mokhlesur Rahman | 203 | 0.1 | N/A |
| Independent | Abdus Salam Bhuiya | 112 | 0.1 | N/A |
| Majority | | 34,395 | 24.9 | −4.7 |
| Turnout | | 138,074 | 71.2 | −8.8 |
| BNP hold | | | | |

=== Elections in the 1990s ===
General Election June 1996: Munshiganj-3
| Party | Candidate | Votes | % | ±% |
|---|---|---|---|---|
| BNP | Shamsul Islam | 68,791 | 59.6 | −5.7 |
| AL | Md. Lutfar Rahman | 34,670 | 30.0 | −0.5 |
| JP(E) | Md. Jamal Hossain | 6,710 | 5.8 | +4.0 |
| IOJ | Joynul Abedin | 2,682 | 2.3 | N/A |
| Zaker Party | Golam Quddus Bepan | 1,163 | 1.0 | −0.5 |
| Jamaat | Md. Idris Ali | 773 | 0.7 | −0.1 |
| BNAP | M.A. Sattar | 223 | 0.2 | N/A |
| Bangladesh Bekar Samaj | Md. Hasan | 192 | 0.2 | N/A |
| Gano Forum | Abdul Rahim Miah | 111 | 0.1 | N/A |
| Jatiya Samajtantrik Dal (Khalekuzzaman) | Moinuddin | 73 | 0.1 | N/A |
| BNAP (Bhasani) | Md. Mokhlesur Rahman | 43 | 0.0 | N/A |
| Majority | | 34,121 | 29.6 | −5.1 |
| Turnout | | 115,431 | 80.0 | +31.9 |
| BNP hold | | | | |

General Election 1991: Munshiganj-3
| Party | Candidate | Votes | % | ±% |
|---|---|---|---|---|
| BNP | Shamsul Islam | 63,053 | 65.3 | |
| AL | Moktadir | 29,488 | 30.5 | |
| JP(E) | Abed Ali Khan | 1,735 | 1.8 | |
| Zaker Party | Kuddus Bepari | 1,417 | 1.5 | |
| Jamaat | Idris Barai | 766 | 0.8 | |
| Bangladesh National Congress | Md. Siddiqur Rahman | 169 | 0.2 | |
| Majority | | 33,565 | 34.7 | |
| Turnout | | 96,628 | 48.1 | |
| BNP gain from JP(E) | | | | |
