= Abdul Latif Bhuiyan =

Bangladeshi politician

Member of Parliament for Kishoreganj-7
- In office 27 February 1991 – 15 February 1996
- Preceded by: Abu Bakr Siddique
- Succeeded by: Shafiqul Islam

Member of Parliament for Kishoreganj-5
- In office 3 March 1988 – 6 December 1990
- Preceded by: Abdul Hamid
- Succeeded by: Abdul Hamid

Personal details
- Born: c. 1950
- Died: 17 June 2015 (aged 65)
- Party: Jatiya Party

Abdul Latif Bhuiyan (c. 1950 – 17 June 2015) was a Bangladeshi politician from Kishoreganj belonging to Jatiya Party. He was a member of the Jatiya Sangsad.

== Biography ==
Bhuiyan was the president of Kishoreganj unit of Jatiya Party. He was elected as a member of the Jatiya Sangsad from Kishoreganj-5 as an Jatiya Party in candidate 1988 Bangladeshi general election. He was elected a Member of Parliament from Kishoreganj-7 constituency as a Bangladesh Nationalist Party candidate in 1991 Bangladeshi general election.

Bhuiyan died of cardiac arrest on 17 June 2015 at his own home in Kishoreganj at the age of 65.
