= Naogaon-5 =

Constituency of Bangladesh's Jatiya Sangsad

Coordinates: 24.83°N 88.93°E

- Constituency for the Jatiya Sangsad
- District: Naogaon District
- Division: Rajshahi Division
- Electorate: 289,228 (2018)

Current constituency
- Created: 1984
- Party: Bangladesh Nationalist Party
- Member: Md. Zahidul Islam Dhalu
- ← 49 Naogaon-4 51 Naogaon-6 →

Naogaon-5 is a constituency represented in the Jatiya Sangsad (National Parliament) of Bangladesh since 2026 by Md. Zahidul Islam Dhalu of the Bangladesh Nationalist Party.

== Boundaries ==
The constituency encompasses Naogaon Sadar Upazila.

== History ==
The constituency was created in 1984 from the Rajshahi-8 constituency when the former Rajshahi District was split into four districts: Nawabganj, Naogaon, Rajshahi, and Natore.

== Members of Parliament ==
Election	Member	Party
1986	Abdul Jalil	Awami League
1988	Abdul Hai	Jatiya Party
1991	Shamsuddin Ahmed	Bangladesh Nationalist Party
1996	Shamsuddin Ahmed	Bangladesh Nationalist Party
2001	Abdul Jalil	Awami League
2013 by-election	Abdul Malek	Awami League
2018	Nizam Uddin Jalil John	Awami League
2026	Md. Zahidul Islam Dhalu	Bangladesh Nationalist Party

== Elections ==
=== Elections in the 2020s ===
General Election 2026: Naogaon-5
Party	Candidate	Votes	%	±%
BNP	Md. Zahidul Islam Dhalu	129,385		
Jamaat	Abu Sadat Mohammad Sayem	104,747		
Majority		24,638		
Turnout				
BNP gain from AL				

=== Elections in the 2010s ===
General Election 2018: Naogaon-5
Party	Candidate	Votes	%	±%
AL	Nizam Uddin Jalil John	156,965		
BNP	Md. Zahidul Islam Dhalu	83,759		
Majority		73,206		
Turnout				
AL hold				

General Election 2014: Naogaon-5
Party	Candidate	Votes	%	±%
AL	Abdul Malek	44,080	54.0	−6.0
Independent	Rafiqul Islam	37,532	46.0	N/A
Majority		6,548	8.0	−12.2
Turnout		81,612	28.8	−60.9
AL hold				

Abdul Jalil died in March 2013. Abdul Malek of the Awami League was elected unopposed in May 2013 after the Election Commission disqualified the other five candidates in the by-election scheduled for later that month.

=== Elections in the 2000s ===
General Election 2008: Naogaon-5
Party	Candidate	Votes	%	±%
AL	Abdul Jalil	136,643	60.0	+10.0
BNP	Abdul Latif Khan	90,662	39.8	−9.1
BDB	S. M. Habibur Rahman	435	0.2	N/A
Majority		45,981	20.2	+19.1
Turnout		227,710	89.7	+4.8
AL hold				

General Election 2001: Naogaon-5
Party	Candidate	Votes	%	±%
AL	Abdul Jalil	96,382	50.0	+8.3
BNP	Shamsuddin Ahmed	94,235	48.9	−4.2
IJOF	Md. Tofazzal Hossain	1,314	0.7	N/A
Independent	Md. Abdur Razzak	459	0.2	N/A
CPB	Md. Moinul Haque	211	0.1	N/A
JSD	Abul Kashem Sarder	138	0.1	N/A
Majority		2,147	1.1	−10.2
Turnout		192,739	84.9	−0.8
AL gain from BNP				

=== Elections in the 1990s ===
General Election June 1996: Naogaon-5
Party	Candidate	Votes	%	±%
BNP	Shamsuddin Ahmed	84,481	53.1	−10.0
AL	Abdul Jalil	66,423	41.7	+7.6
Jamaat	Yunus Ali	3,942	2.5	N/A
JP(E)	A. K. M. Morshed	3,265	2.1	+0.9
IOJ	Md. Abdur Rahman	697	0.4	N/A
Jatiya Samajtantrik Dal-JSD	Abul Kashem Sardar	202	0.1	0.0
Zaker Party	Md. Ataur Rahman	158	0.1	−0.1
Majority		18,058	11.3	−17.7
Turnout		159,168	85.7	+12.2
BNP hold				

General Election 1991: Naogaon-5
Party	Candidate	Votes	%	±%
BNP	Shamsuddin Ahmed	85,367	63.1	
AL	Abdul Jalil	46,184	34.1	
JP(E)	Md. Abdul Hai Khan	1,639	1.2	
FP	Md. Atiqur Rahman	1,190	0.9	
JSD	Md. Khairul Alam	409	0.3	
Zaker Party	Md. Maejudur Rahman	260	0.2	
Jatiya Samajtantrik Dal-JSD	Md. Abul Kashem Sardar	201	0.1	
NAP (Muzaffar)	A. N. M. Mozaharul Haq	47	0.0	
Majority		39,183	29.0	
Turnout		135,297	73.5	
BNP gain from				
