= Abdur Rahim (Dhaka politician) =

Bangladeshi politician

Member of Bangladesh Parliament
- In office 1986–1988
- In office 1988–1990

Personal details
- Party: Jatiya Party (Ershad)

Abdur Rahim (Bengali: আব্দুর রহিম) is a Jatiya Party (Ershad) politician and a former member of parliament for Dhaka-6.

== Career ==
Rahim was elected to parliament from Dhaka-6 as a Jatiya Party candidate in 1986 and 1988.
