= Golam Dastagir Gazi =

Bangladeshi politician

- গোলাম দস্তগীর গাজী
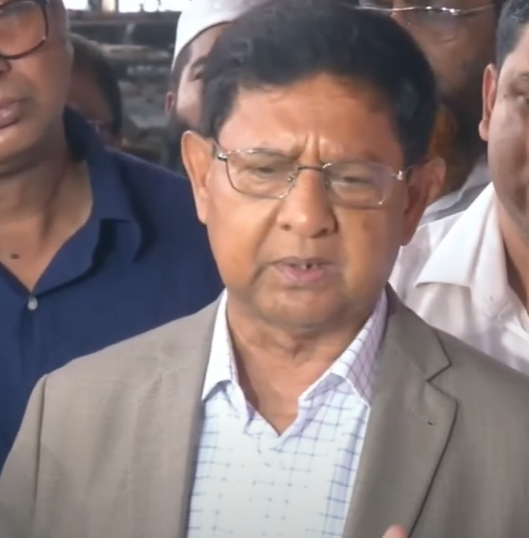

Minister of Textiles and Jute
- In office 7 January 2019 – 11 January 2024
- Preceded by: Emaz Uddin Pramanik
- Succeeded by: Jahangir Kabir Nanak

Member of Parliament for Narayanganj-1
- In office 25 January 2009 – 5 August 2024
- Preceded by: Abdul Matin Chowdhury

Personal details
- Born: 14 September 1948 (age 78)
- Party: Bangladesh Awami League
- Spouse: Hasina Gazi
- Education: University of Dhaka
- Awards: Bir Protik; Independence Day Award

Golam Dastagir Gazi (born 14 August 1948) is a Bangladeshi industrialist and a politician of the Bangladesh Awami League party. He is a former Jatiya Sangsad member representing the Narayanganj-1 constituency. In January 2019, he was selected as the minister of textiles and jute.

Gazi is the chairman of Gazi TV and the chairman of Gazi Group. He is a former director of the Bangladesh Cricket Board.

Gazi is a recipient of Bir Protik, the fourth-highest gallantry award in Bangladesh. In the liberation war, he was a member of the guerrilla group Crack Platoon. In 2020, he was awarded the Independence Day Award by the government of Bangladesh.

== Early life and education ==
Gazi was born to Golam Kibria Gazi and Shamsunnesa Begum. Gazi graduated from the University of Dhaka in 1968.

== Career ==
In 1977, Gazi was elected as a commissioner in the first election of the Dhaka City Corporation from his electoral areas — Kakrail, Sidheshwari, Malibag, Eskaton, and Mogbazar. Gazi started his manufacturing industries in the plastic and rubber sector in 1974.

Gazi is a former president of the Bangladesh-China Chamber of Commerce and Industry.

Golam Dastagir Gazi was arrested in Dhaka's Shantinagar area on 25 August 2024.

== Personal life ==
Gazi is married to Hasina Gazi (b. 1955), a former mayor of Tarabo Municipality, Narayanganj. The couple is blessed with 2 sons.

== Awards ==
- Bir Protik
- Independence Day Award (2020)
