= Mujibur Rahman Monju (Kishoreganj politician) =

Bangladeshi politician

Member of Parliament for Kishoreganj-5
- In office 1996–2001

Personal details
- Died: 18 May 2015 (aged 68) Kishoreganj District, Bangladesh
- Party: Bangladesh Nationalist Party

Mujibur Rahman Monju (died 18 May 2015) was a Bangladesh Nationalist Party politician and a member of parliament for Kishoreganj-6.

== Career ==
Monju was elected to parliament from Kishoreganj-5 as a Bangladesh Nationalist Party candidate in 1996 and 2001.

== Death ==
Monju died on 18 May 2015 in Jahurul Islam Medical College, Bhagalpur, Bajitpur Upazila, Kishoreganj District, Bangladesh.
