= Hafizur Rahman Pramanik =

Bangladeshi politician

Member of Bangladesh Parliament

Personal details
- Party: Jatiya Party (Ershad)

Hafizur Rahman Pramanik is a Jatiya Party (Ershad) politician and a former member of parliament for Gaibandha-1.

== Career ==
Pramanik was elected to parliament from Gaibandha-1 as a Jatiya Party candidate in 1986, 1988, and 1991.
