= Shamsuddin Ahmed (Naogaon politician) =

Bangladeshi politician

Member of Bangladesh Parliament

Personal details
- Party: Bangladesh Nationalist Party

Shamsuddin Ahmed is a Bangladesh Nationalist Party politician and a former member of parliament for Naogaon-5.

== Career ==
Ahmed was elected to parliament from Naogaon-5 as a Bangladesh Nationalist Party candidate in 1991 and 1996.

He stood again for the seat in the 2001 Bangladeshi general election, losing to the Awami League.
