= Mohammad Jamal Hossain =

Bangladeshi politician

Member of Bangladesh Parliament
- In office 1988–1990

Mohammad Jamal Hossain (Bengali: মোহাম্মদ জামাল হোসেন) is a Bangladeshi politician and a former member of the Bangladesh Parliament for Munshiganj-3.

== Career ==
Hossain was elected to parliament from Munshiganj-3 as a Combined opposition candidate in 1988.
