= Khandakar Mofizur Rahman =

Bangladeshi politician (1948–2018)

Member of Bangladesh Parliament
- In office 1988–1990

Personal details
- Died: 28 March 2018

Khandakar Mofizur Rahman (Bengali: খন্দকার মফিজুর রহমান) was a politician in Bangladesh and member of parliament for Kishoreganj-6.

== Career ==
Rahman was elected to parliament from Kishoreganj-6 as a Combined opposition candidate in 1988.

== Death ==
Rahman died on 28 March 2018.
