= Kuliarchar Upazila =

Kuliarchar কুলিয়ারচর
- Upazila
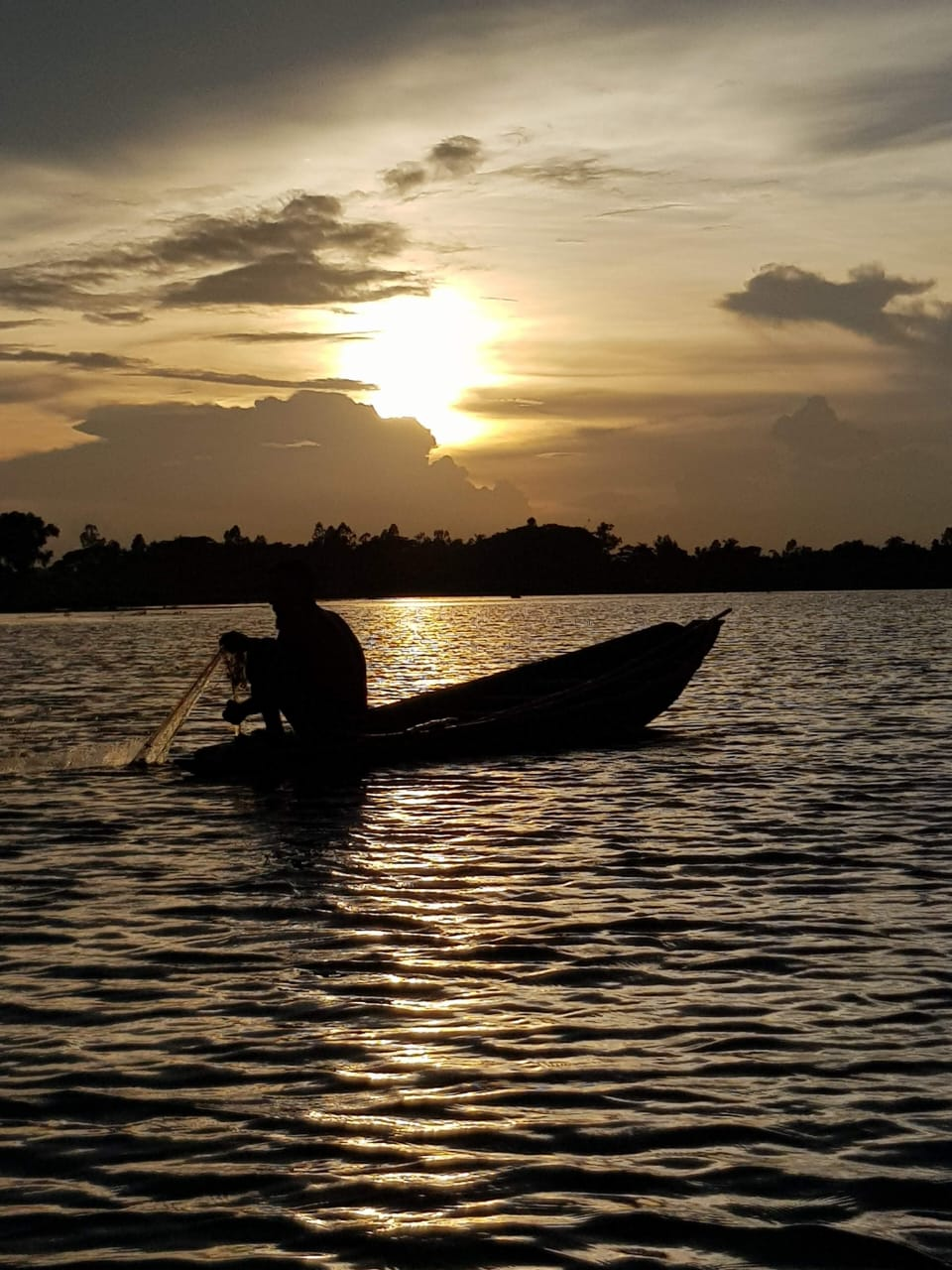
- A lone fisherman casts a net at sunset in Chhaysuti, Kuliarchar, Kishoreganj

- Coordinates: 24°9.3′N 90°54′E
- Country: Bangladesh
- Division: Dhaka
- District: Kishoreganj

Area
  - Total: 104.01 km^{2} (40.16 sq mi)

Population (2022)
  - Total: 202,477
  - Density: 1,946.7/km^{2} (5,041.9/sq mi)
- Time zone: UTC+6 (BST)
- Postal code: 2340
- Website: kuliarchar.kishoreganj.gov.bd

Kuliarchar (Bengali: কুলিয়ারচর kuliearcor) is an upazila of Kishoreganj District under the division of Dhaka, Bangladesh. It is about 97.6 km (61 mi) northwest of the capital city of Dhaka. It is also a center of business, especially the fish, jute trade and processing plants, and the shoes sector of the country.

== Geography ==
Kuliarchar is located at 24.1542°N 90.9000°E. It has a total area of 104.01 km^{2}. It is in north east of Bangladesh.

== Demographics ==
Religions in Kuliarchar Upazila (2022)
Religion	Percent
Islam	93.92%
Hinduism	6.07%
Other or not stated	0.01%

According to the 2022 Bangladeshi census, Kuliarchar Upazila had 47,647 households and a population of 202,477. 11.13% of the population were under 5 years of age. Kuliarchar had a literacy rate (age 7 and over) of 71.55%: 72.56% for males and 70.65% for females, and a sex ratio of 90.41 males for every 100 females. 80,677 (39.85%) lived in urban areas.

According to the 2011 Census of Bangladesh, Kuliarchar Upazila had 39,166 households and a population of 182,236. 52,158 (28.62%) were under 10 years of age. Kuliarchar had a literacy rate (age 7 and over) of 44.64%, compared to the national average of 51.8%, and a sex ratio of 1072 females per 1000 males. 31,781 (17.44%) lived in urban areas.

== Administration ==
Kuliarchar Upazila is divided into Kuliarchar Municipality and six union parishads: Chhaysuti, Faridpur, Gobaria Abdullahpur, Osmanpur, Ramdi, and Salua. The union parishads are subdivided into 46 mauzas and 97 villages.

Kuliarchar Municipality is subdivided into 9 wards and 37 mahallas.

== Education ==
Kuliarchar has one degree college (Kuliarchar Government College), 3 high schools, 12 primary schools, and a madrasa.

== Hospitals ==
- Upazila Health Complex

== See also ==
- Upazilas of Bangladesh
- Districts of Bangladesh
- Divisions of Bangladesh
