= Bangladesh Chhatra League =

Student wing of the Awami League

Bangladesh Chhatra League বাংলাদেশ ছাত্রলীগ
- Bangladesh Chhatra League Badge
- President: Saddam Hussain
- Secretary General: Sheikh Wali Asif Enan
- Founded: 4 January 1948; 78 years ago
- Preceded by: East Pakistan Students' League
- Dissolved: 23 October 2024; 2 years ago (Banned)
- Ideology: Mujibism; Bengali nationalism
- National affiliation: Bangladesh Awami League
- International affiliation: International Union of Students
- Slogan: Joy Bangla, Joy Bangabandhu ('Victory to Bengal, victory to Bangabandhu')

Flag

Bangladesh Chhatra League, (Note: ~Bengali: বাংলাদেশ ছাত্রলীগ, romanized: Baṅladeś Chatrōlig, lit. 'Bangladesh Students' League', Bangla pronunciation: Bengali pronunciation: [ˈbɑŋlɑd̪eːʃ ˈʧʰɑːt̪roliɡ]:abbr. BCL/BSL) simply Chhatra League (Bengali pronunciation: [বাংলাদেশ ছাত্রলীগ]), is the student wing of the Bangladesh Awami League, founded by Sheikh Mujibur Rahman on 4 January 1948. Historically involved in major movements such as the 1952 Language Movement, 1971 Liberation War and 1990 mass uprising, the organisation later became notorious for widespread violence, including killings, drugs dealing, extortion, and alleged forced prostitution.

The interim government of Bangladesh banned the organisation on 23 October 2024 under the Anti-Terrorism Act, 2009, citing its alleged involvement in terrorism and human rights violations, including the suppression of protests during the 2024 July Uprising.

Saddam Hussain, the current president of BCL, is facing criminal investigations for his alleged involvement in the July massacre, with a warrant issued for his arrest. Most of the top members of the organisation, including its president and general secretary, went into hiding following the resignation of Awami League chief Sheikh Hasina as the Prime Minister of the country.

== History ==
On 4 January 1948, the East Pakistan Muslim Chhatra League was established by Sheikh Mujibur Rahman at a meeting in Fazlul Huq Muslim Hall at the University of Dhaka. Naeemuddin Ahmed was the first convener of BSL, while Khaleque Nawaz Khan was the founder general secretary of the Chhatra League.

The Chhatra League played an important role in the Bengali language movement of 1952 through breaking curfews with their protests.

The Chhatra League led student protests against the Shariff Commission recommendations in the 1962 East Pakistan Education movement.

The organisation's name was changed to the Bangladesh Chhatra League after the Independence of Bangladesh in 1971.

During the Bangladesh Liberation War, the Bangladesh Chhatra League was a key player, but in 1972, it broke up into two factions based on their allegiance to Shekh Mujibur Rahman. The group was a pioneer in the 1952 language movement, the 1954 general election victory of the United Front (East Pakistan), the anti-Aiyub movement in 1958, the education movement in 1962, the Six-Point movement in 1966, the 1969 East Pakistan mass uprising, and the 1970 Pakistani general election.

During the 1971 Bangladesh Liberation War, members of the Chhatra League were recruited into the Mujib Bahini (also known as the Bengal Liberation Force), an armed group trained by India's foreign intelligence agency, the Research and Analysis Wing. However, their exact involvement in the war is disputed, with Zafrullah Chowdhury stating, "The Mujib Bahini did not fight the liberation war." In 2014, A. K. Khandker was sued for accusing the Mujib Bahini of hooliganism and looting during the war in his book 1971: Bhetore Baire.

=== Ban ===
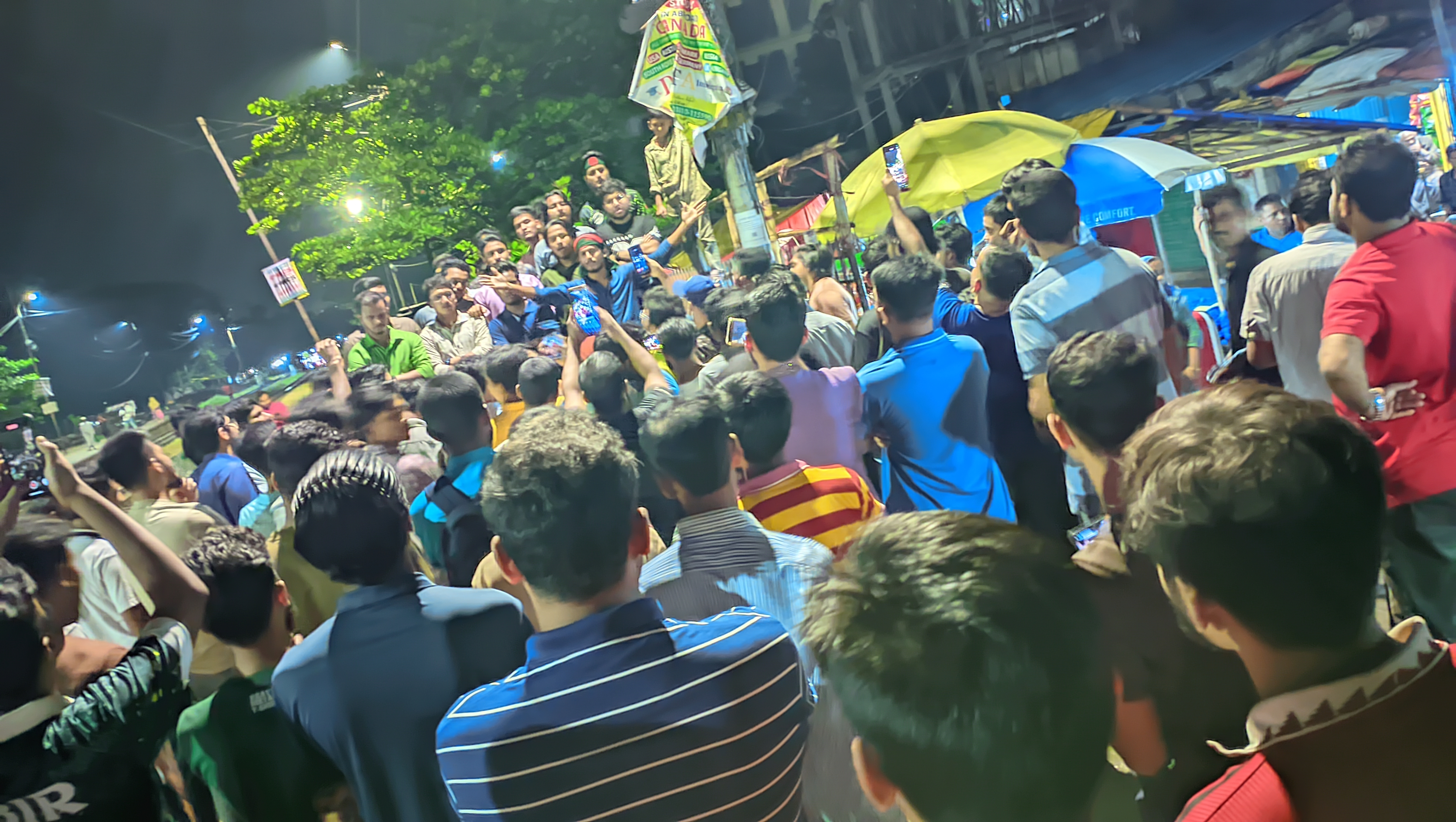
Celebration following ban and designation of BCL as a terrorist organization in Sholoshohor, Chittagong

On 23 October 2024, interim government of Bangladesh officially banned the organisation in response to acts of violence committed by its members and leaders from 2008 to 2024. The decision followed the BCL's involvement in violent incidents during the July Uprising. The Ministry of Home Affairs' Public Security Division issued a gazette notification announcing the ban, invoking provisions of the Anti-Terrorism Act of 2009, with specific reference to the group's role in the July massacre.

=== Structure ===
Motto	Education, Peace, Progress
Unit number	111 (Note: Main unit being the University of Dhaka Unit)
Organizational Guardian	Sheikh Hasina

== Criticism ==
=== Sexual misconduct and violence against women ===
Since the 1990s, the Chhatra League has faced numerous allegations regarding rape, sexual violence, and the use of fear to suppress women. In 1998, the celebration of rape by leaders at Jahangirnagar University triggered the 1999 JU Anti-Rape Movement, resulting in the expulsion of the unit's general secretary and his followers.

In 2015, activists were implicated in the mass sexual harassment of women during Pohela Boishakh celebrations at Dhaka University, where police allegedly failed to intervene despite witnessing the assaults.

Further incidents include the 2020 gang rape of a woman at Murari Chand College hostel, confirmed by DNA evidence; the alleged gang rape of a tourist in Cox's Bazar; and sexual assaults at the University of Chittagong, where investigations were reportedly obstructed by political figures. In 2022, allegations of a "sex trade" ring run by BCL leadership surfaced at Eden Mohila College.

=== Homicides and physical assaults ===
The organization has been linked to several high-profile murders and violent attacks. In 2012, 24-year-old tailor Biswajit Das was hacked to death by BCL activists near Jagannath University; eight members were eventually sentenced to death. In October 2019, Abrar Fahad, a student at BUET, was tortured and beaten to death by BCL leaders in his dormitory, leading to death sentences for 20 convicts.

Other fatal incidents include the 2022 killing of courier Nahid Hossain during clashes in Dhaka's New Market area, and the 2024 mob lynching of Tofazzal Hossain at Dhaka University's Fazlul Huq Muslim Hall. Internal factionalism also resulted in violence, such as the 2018 shooting during a leadership clash at Shahjalal University of Science and Technology.

On 12 December 2025, Osman Hadi, founder of Inqilab Moncho and an independent candidate for Dhaka-8, was shot by assailants allegedly linked to the Chhatra League and later died from his injuries on 18 December 2025.

=== Political violence and suppression ===
The BCL was frequently accused of using violence to suppress student protests and opposition movements. During the 2018 Bangladesh quota reform movement, members were filmed attacking protesters with hammers and sticks at Rajshahi University, drawing criticism for police inaction. Shortly after, during the 2018 Bangladesh road safety protests, helmeted BCL members allegedly assaulted journalists and demonstrators. Reporters Without Borders also noted attacks by BCL affiliates on journalists covering the 2020 Dhaka city elections.

In 2021, BCL leaders threatened and attacked anti-Modi protesters, contributing to clashes that resulted in multiple fatalities. The violence culminated during the July Uprising, where BCL members worked alongside law enforcement to suppress the quota reform movement. The ensuing crackdown allegedly resulted in over a thousand deaths and thousands of injuries, leading to the organization's ban under anti-terrorism laws.

=== Communal violence ===
BCL leaders have been implicated in the 2021 anti-Hindu violence in Chandpur and Rangpur. Investigations revealed that local BCL activists collaborated with religious leaders to incite attacks on temples and Hindu villages following fabricated blasphemy allegations.

=== July Uprising ===
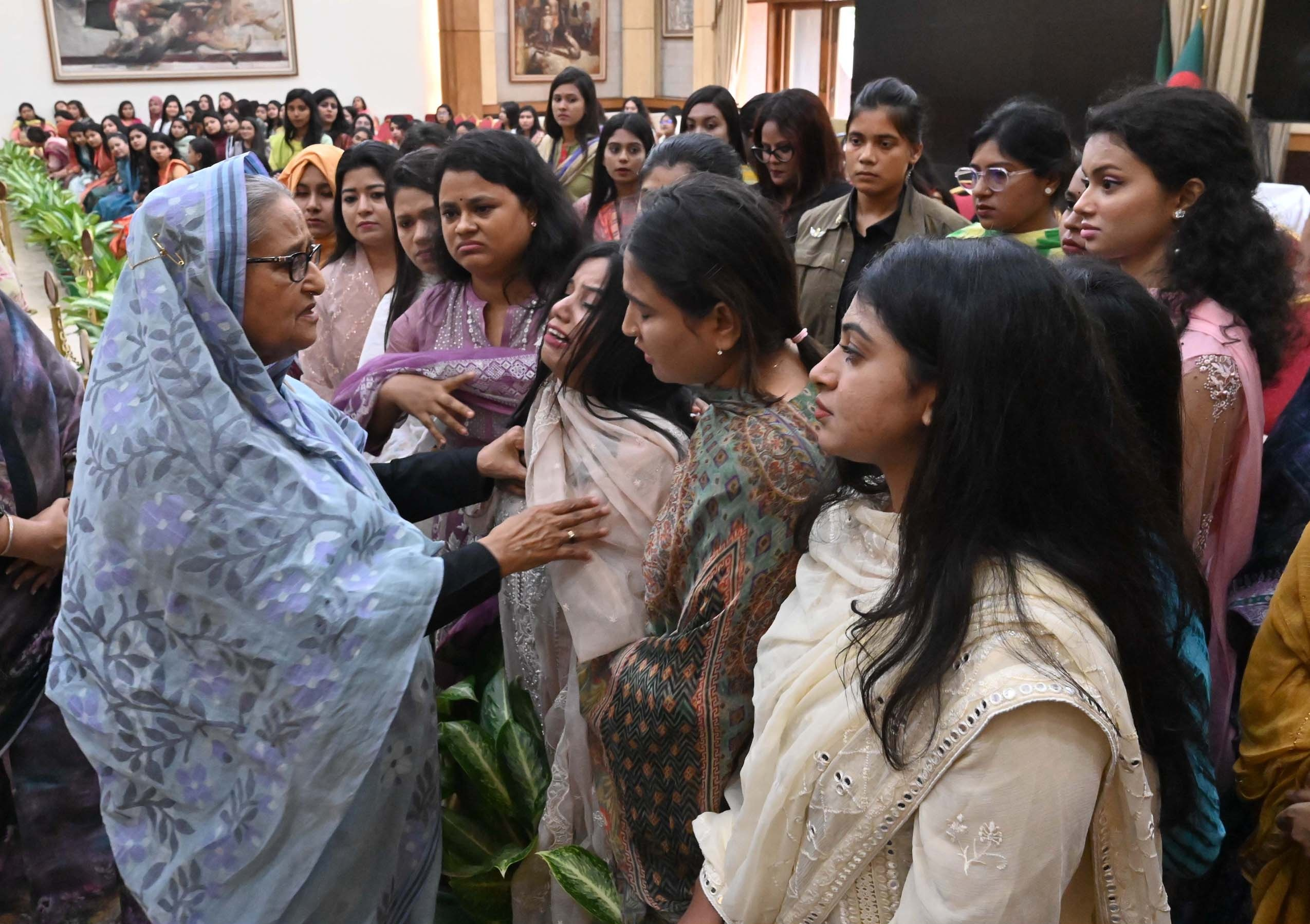
Women activists of the Bangladesh Chhatra League, claiming to have been injured by general students during the quota reform protests, met Sheikh Hasina at Ganabhaban on 29 July 2024.

During the July Uprising in Bangladesh, activists of the Bangladesh Chhatra League were widely accused of carrying out attacks on students protesting reforms to the public service quota system. Clashes between BCL activists and demonstrators occurred on several locations where protesters reported being assaulted with sticks, iron rods, and bricks. Hundreds of people were injured in these confrontations, including female students. In some incidents, BCL activists also entered the emergency department of Dhaka Medical College Hospital, where injured protesters were receiving treatment, causing panic and disrupting medical services.

== Presidents and general-secretaries ==
	Year	Presidents	Later role/Affiliation	General secretaries	Later role/Affiliation
1	1970-72	Nur-e-Alam Siddiqui	Businessman	Shajahan Siraj (Expelled in 1972)	Minister & MP from BNP
2	1972-1972	Nur-e-Alam Siddiqui	Businessman	Ismat Kadir Gama	Unknown
3	1972-1973	Sheikh Shahidul Islam	Secretary General, Jatiya Party (Manju)	MA Radhid	Unknown
4	1973-74	Monirul Haq Chowdhury	Vice President, BNP	Mostofa Jalal Mohiuddin	MP from Awami League
5	1976-77	MA Awal (Convenor)	Unknown	N/A	N/A
6	1977-81	Obaidul Quader	General Secretary, Awami League	Bahalul Majnun Chunnu	Unknown
7	1981-83	Mostofa Jalal Mohiuddin	MP from Awami League	AKM Jahangir Hossain	MP from Awami League
8	1983-85	Abdul Mannan	Organizing Secretary, Awami League	Jahangir Kabir Nanak	Presidium Member, Awami League
9	1986-88	Sultan Mohammad Mansur Ahmed	Parliament member from Gono Forum	Abdur Rahman, MP	Joint Secretary, Awami League
10	1988-1990	Habibur Rahman	Expelled, Advisor of BNP	Ashim Kumar Ukil, MP	Cultural Secretary, Awami League
11	1990-92	Shahe Alam	MP from Awami League	Ashim Kumar Ukil, MP	Cultural Secretary, Awami League
12	1992-94	Mainuddin Hossain Chowdhury	Inactive in politics	Iqbalur Rahim	MP from Awami League
13	1994-98	AKM Enamul Haque Shamim	MP from Awami League	Ishaq Ali Khan Panna	Businessman
14	1999-02	Bahadur Bepari	Executive Committee member, Awami League	Ajay Kar Khokon	Awami League leader
15	2002-06	Liaqat Shikder	Sub-committee member Awami League	Nazrul Islam Babu	MP from Awami League
16	2006-11	Mahmud Hasan Ripon	Active in Gaibandha	Mahfuzul Haider Chowdhury Roton	Inactive in politics
17	2011-15	HM Badiuzzaman Sohag	Active in Bagerhat Awami League	Siddiqui Nazmul Alam	Resides in UK, inactive
18	2015-2018	Saifur Rahman Sohag	Active in Madaripur Awami League	SM Zakir Hossain	Active in Sylhet Awami League
19	2018-2019	Rezwanul Haque Chowdhury Shovon	Inactive in politics	Golam Rabbani	Inactive in politics
20	2019-2022	Al-Nahean Khan Joy	Unknown	Lekhak Bhattacharjee	Unknown
21	2022–present	Saddam Hussain	In exile in India after Hasina Administration fell	Sheikh Wali Asif Enan	In exile in India

== See also ==
- List of student organizations in Bangladesh
- Criticism of Awami League
