= Siddiqur Rahman =

Siddiqur Rahman is a Bengali masculine given name of Arabic origin.

- Siddiquir Rahman Munshiganji (born 1919), politician
- Mohammad Siddiqur Rahman (born 1935), cabinet minister
- Siddiqur Rahman "Bagha Siddiq" (1944–2023), parliamentarian and freedom fighter
- Siddiqur Rahman Choudhury (born 1949), former finance secretary of Bangladesh
- Siddiqur Rahman Patuakhali (1951-1986), parliamentarian and freedom fighter
- Siddiqur Rahman Patwari (born 1961), politician
- Siddiqur Rahman Sarker (1963-2025), former engineer-in-chief of Bangladesh Army
- Mohammad Siddikur Rahman (born 1984), golfer
- Siddiqur Rahman Miah, supreme court judge
- Mohammad Siddiqur Rahman Manikganji, politician

== See also ==
- Siddiq (name)
- Rahman (name)
