= Killing of Tofazzal Hossain =

2024 murder in Bangladesh

- Part of Bangladesh post-resignation violence (2024–2026)
- Location: Fazlul Huq Muslim Hall, Dhaka University, Dhaka, Bangladesh
- Date: 18 September 2024
- Attack type: Lynching, mob attack
- Victim: Tofazzal Hossain
- Perpetrator: Students of Fazlul Huq Muslim Hall
- Motive: Alleged theft
- Inquiry: Dhaka Metropolitan Police
- Accused: 6
- Charges: Murder

The killing of Tofazzal Hossain refers to the killing of a mentally unstable man at the University of Dhaka by students of the university on 18 September 2024. He was beaten to death after being accused of stealing cellphones. At the same day, Shamim Ahmed, was beaten to death at Jahangirnagar University.

== Background ==
From 13 August to 20 September 2024, 21 people were lynched in the 38 days. In Jahangirnagar University, Shamim Ahmed, a former activist of Bangladesh Chhatra League, was beaten to death on 18 September 2024.

=== Tofazzal Hossain ===
Hossain is from Kathaltoli Union, Patharghata Upazila, Barguna District. He did his master's degree in accounting at the Government Suhrawardi College. His father, Abdur Rahman, died in 2016 in a road accident. In 2016 his mother, Beauty Begum, died from cancer. Nasir Uddin, his older brother, a sub-inspector of Bangladesh Police, also died from cancer on 7 April 2023. He had developed mental problems after the death of his family members, according to his cousins. He used to roam around the campus of the University of Dhaka and would take food offered by students. He was 35 at the time of his death.

== Incident ==
Hossain was detained by students after six phones were stolen from students playing cricket. He was wandering around the gate of the University of Dhaka. He was tortured with cricket stamps at the Fazlul Huq Muslim Hall. Among those involved were three leaders and two active members of the Bangladesh Chhatra League. They assaulted Hossain using cricket bats and stumps, inflicting injuries. As Hossain's condition worsened, he was eventually handed over to the proctors and taken to Dhaka Medical College and Hospital, where he was declared dead on arrival. The students tortured him for hours before stopping to feed him a meal at the canteen. He was again tortured at the extension building guest room. Some of the students called his family members and demanded 35 thousand taka to 200 thousand taka. A proctor team reached the place but students refused to hand him. He was handed over to the students when his condition had deteriorated. The proctors took him to Shahbagh Police Station which told them to take him to the nearby Dhaka Medical College and Hospital. He was brought dead to the hospital.

== Reaction ==
Jahangir Alam Chowdhury, adviser in charge of the Minister of Home affairs expressed regret over the death of Tofazzal Hossain and the death in Jahangirnagar University. ZI Khan Panna, Supreme Court lawyer, was critical of Jahangir Alam Chowdhury for expressing regret but not taking action. Another lawyer, Jyotirmoy Barua, said "After the dictator (Sheikh Hasina) was deposed through an uprising, a group of people now believe that they can dispense justice as they want and the authorities would comply with whatever they say". The University of Dhaka condemned the incident. Democratic Student Alliance and the Students Against Discrimination held protests at the University of Dhaka and Jahangirnagar University.

Bangladesh Jatiotabadi Chatra Dal condemned extrajudicial killings at the Teacher Student Center (TSC) of the University of Dhaka. Zonayed Saki of the Ganosamhati Andolan condemned the killing. Left Democratic Alliance called for arrest and punishment of those involved.

Police detained six students of the University of Dhaka in connection with the killing. Mohammad Amanullah, supervisor of the estate office of the University of Dhaka filed a murder case with the Shahbagh Police Station. The university also handed over two students, suspected of being involved in the killing, to the police.

On February 2, 2025, the police submitted a charge sheet naming 21 students of the University of Dhaka. The family of Tofazzal Hossain and their legal counsel expressed satisfaction with the investigation report during the charge framing hearing, although the university authority objected, citing delays and alleged attempts to shield some accused individuals. The charge sheet detailed how the attackers had demanded Tk 35,000 from the family before brutally beating the mentally unstable Tofazzal to death using cricket stumps and bamboo sticks, causing fatal internal bleeding and trauma injuries to his shoulders, back, and legs.

Following objections raised by both the university authority and the victim's family, the Chief Metropolitan Magistrate Court ordered the Police Bureau of Investigation (PBI) to conduct a further inquiry into the murder on February 26, 2025. The court mandated that a senior officer, not below the rank of assistant superintendent, oversee the investigation. The victim's lawyer, Barrister Ziaur Rahman, emphasized that CCTV footage clearly identified several individuals involved in the torture and should be grounds for their inclusion in the case.

On May 4, 2025, Bangla Tribune reported that the PBI failed to submit their reinvestigation report by the court-appointed deadline, prompting the magistrate to extend the submission date to June 18. The delayed report came amid increasing scrutiny, as six of the 21 accused had already confessed in court under Section 164 of the Criminal Procedure Code, while the remaining suspects remained fugitives with active arrest warrants issued.
