= Siddiquir Rahman =

Bangladeshi politician

Member of the Bangladesh Parliament for Dhaka-7
- In office 1979–1982
- Preceded by: Abdul Karim Bepari
- Succeeded by: Jahangir Mohammad Adel

Personal details
- Born: 1 September 1919 Makuhati, Munshiganj thana, British India
- Party: Bangladesh Nationalist Party

Siddiquir Rahman is a Bangladesh Nationalist Party politician and a former member of parliament for Dhaka-7.

== Biography ==
Siddiquir Rahman was born on 1 September 1919 in Makuhati village of what is now Munshiganj Sadar Upazila, Munshiganj District, Bangladesh.

Siddiq was elected to parliament from Dhaka-7 as a Bangladesh Nationalist Party candidate in 1979.
