= Bijoy '71 =

Sculpture in Bangladesh

- বিজয় '৭১ (Bengali)
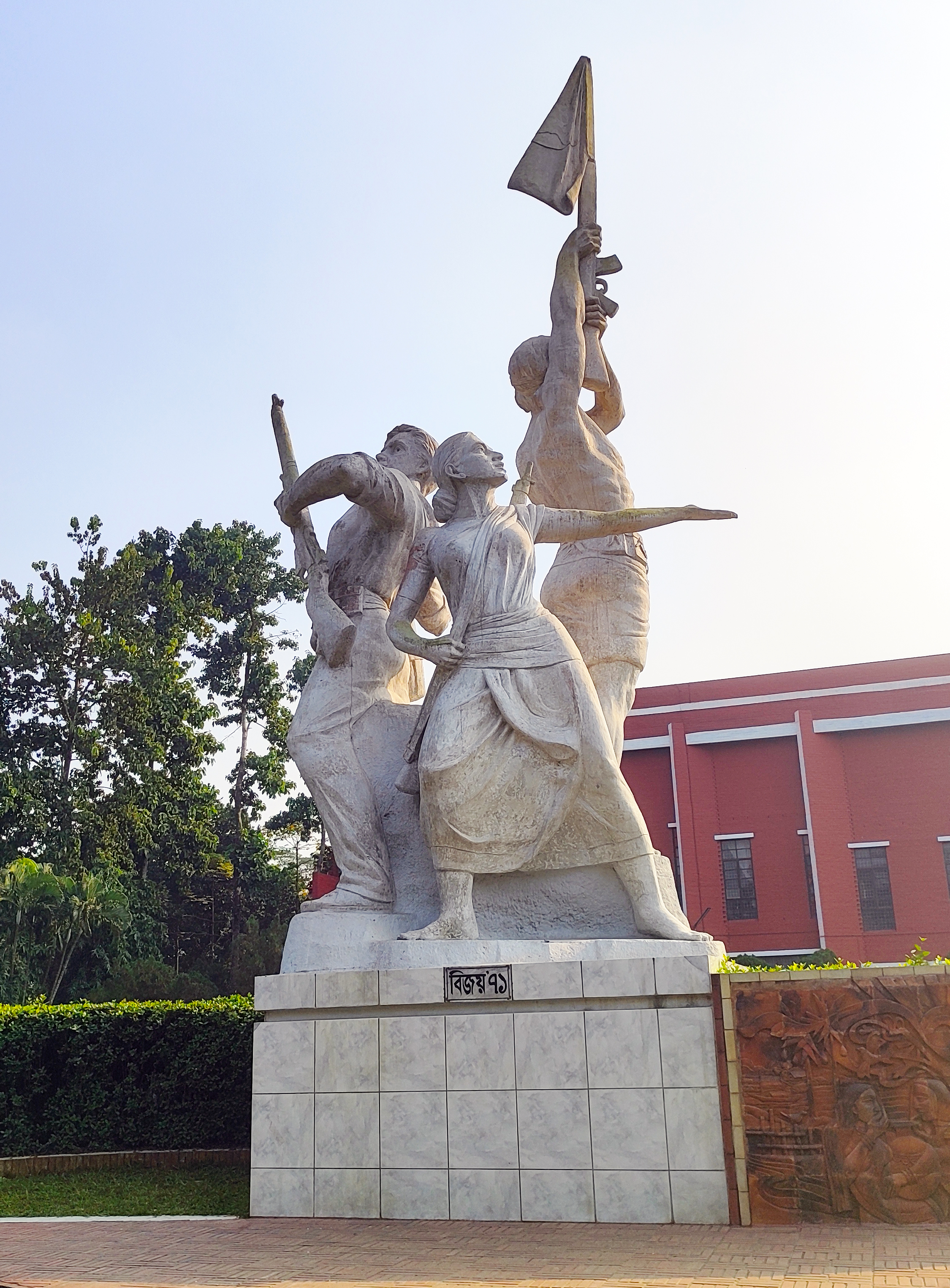
- Bijoy '71 in 2024
- Artist: Shyamol Chowdhury
- Year: 2000
- Subject: Bangladesh Liberation War
- Location: Mymensingh
- 24.724658°N 90.438997°E
- Owner: Bangladesh Agricultural University

Bijoy '71 (Bengali: বিজয় '৭১; English: Victory '71) is a sculpture in Bangladesh that symbolises the spontaneous participation of people from all levels of Bengali society in the Bangladesh Liberation War. The work stands in front of the Zainul Abedin Auditorium at Bangladesh Agricultural University. The sculpture is referenced in the introduction to the Grade 7 Art and Culture textbook of the national curriculum.

== History ==
During the Bangladesh Liberation War, the headquarters of the Pakistan Army's 93rd Brigade was located in the rest house on the campus of Bangladesh Agricultural University. From there, orders were issued for the genocidal massacre of Bengalis across the greater Mymensingh region. In remembrance of the university's wartime history, an initiative was taken to erect a commemorative sculpture. The project was executed by sculptor Shyamol Chowdhury, with construction completed in June 2000 at a cost of approximately 2.4 million taka.

== Description ==
The sculpture mounted on a six‑foot‑high pedestal depicts a woman, a farmer and a student freedom fighter. The sculpture celebrates the heroic popular resistance of the people of Bengal during the Liberation War. At its centre a farmer freedom fighter raises the national flag high as a triumphant emblem of collective defiance. To his right a resolute woman with a rifle summons the nation with unwavering courage and self‑sacrifice. To his left, a student, rifle in his left hand and poised to throw a grenade, embodies youthful bravery, ready to lay down his life for independence. Below the main group, terracotta panels depict events such as the Bengali Language Movement, the 1962 education movement, and the 1966 Six‑Point Movement.

== Gallery ==
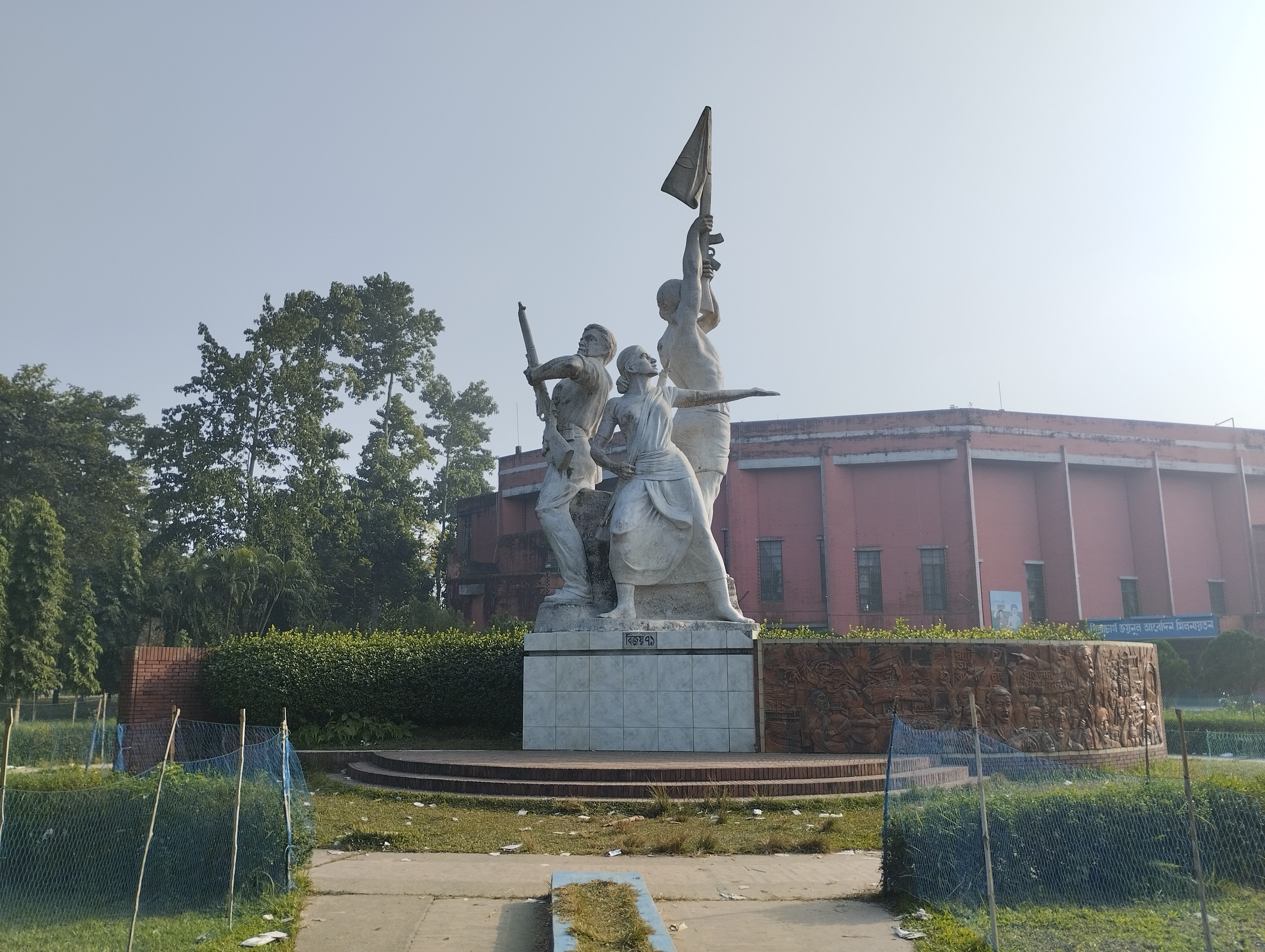

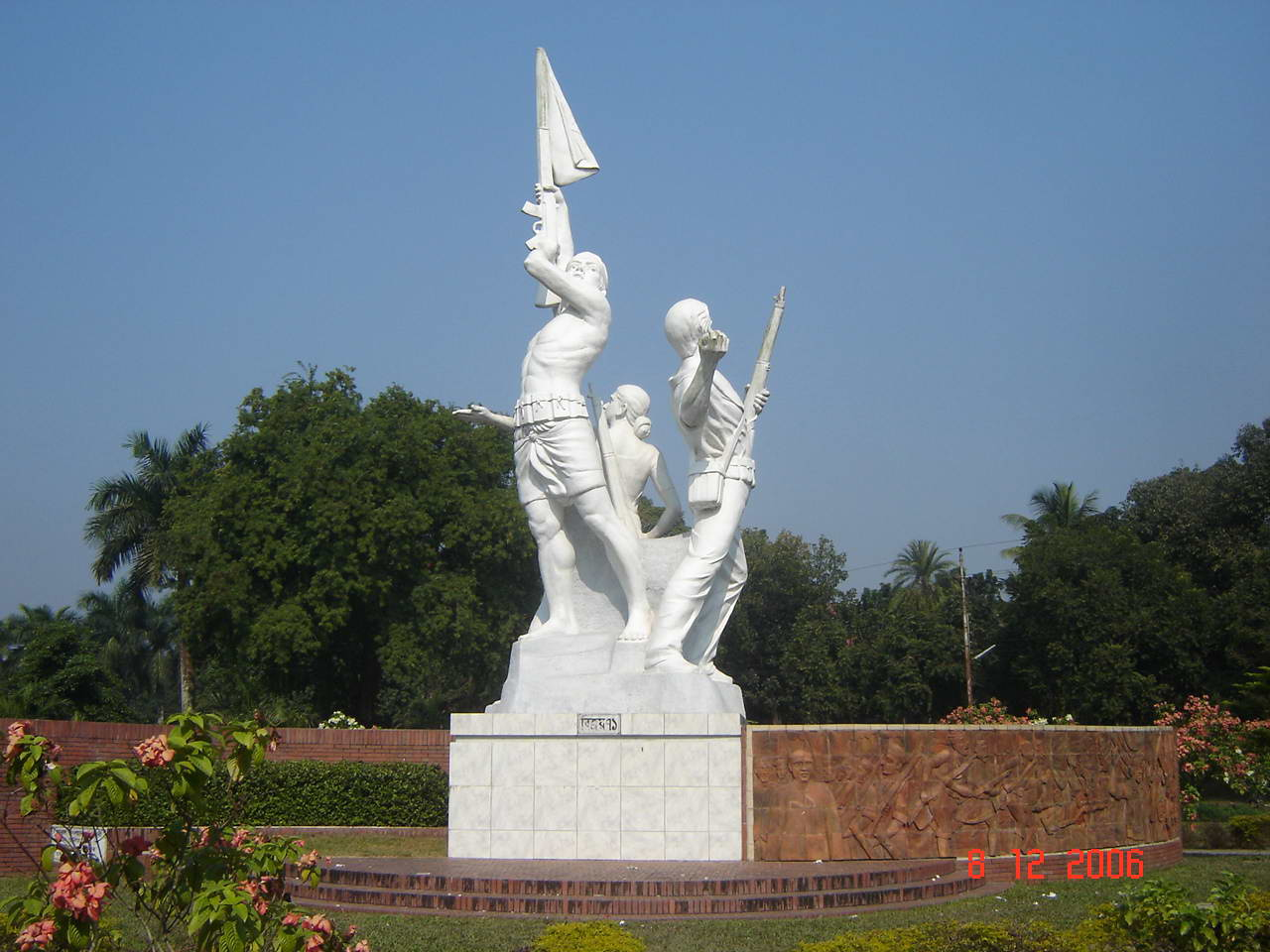

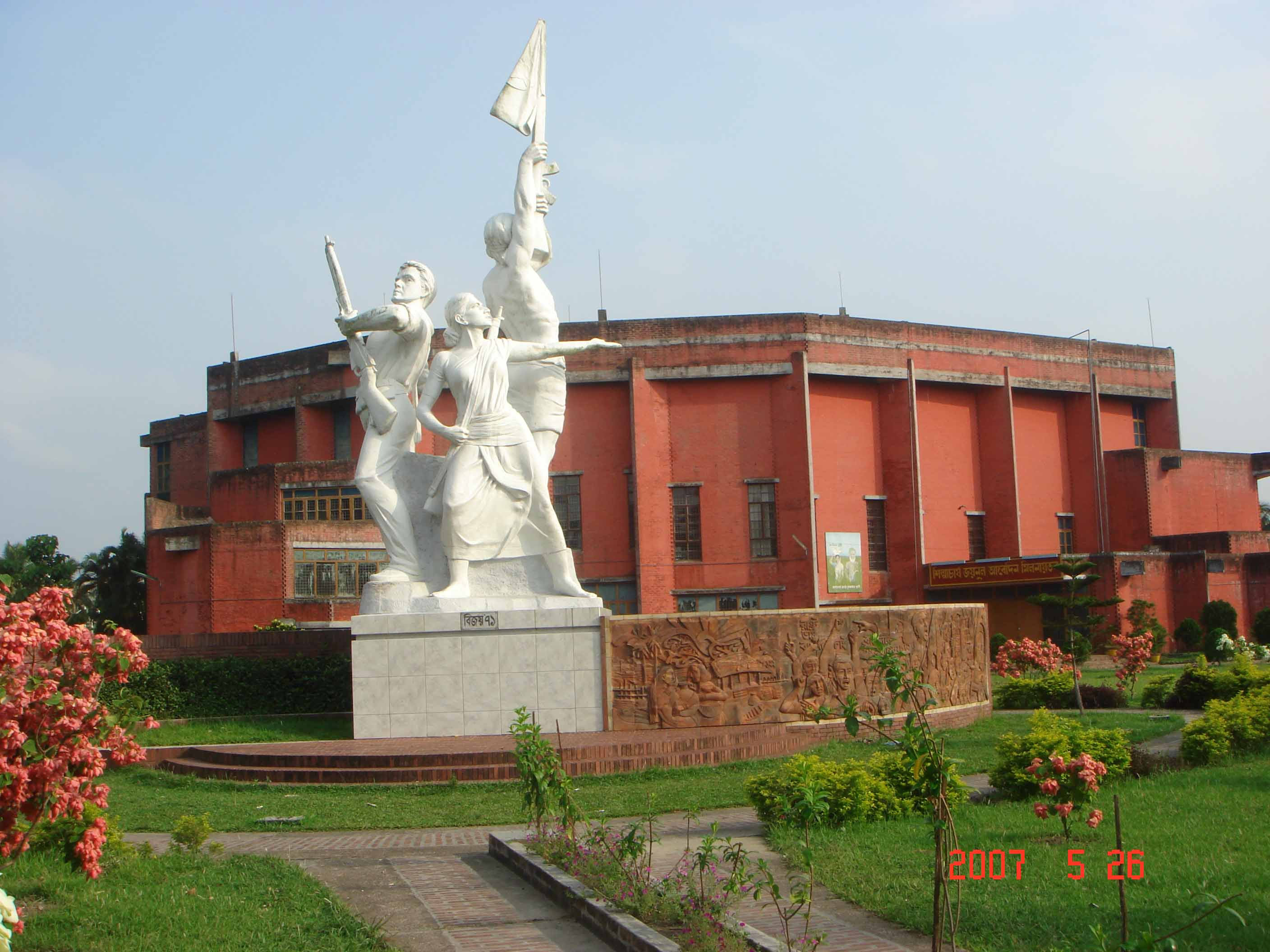

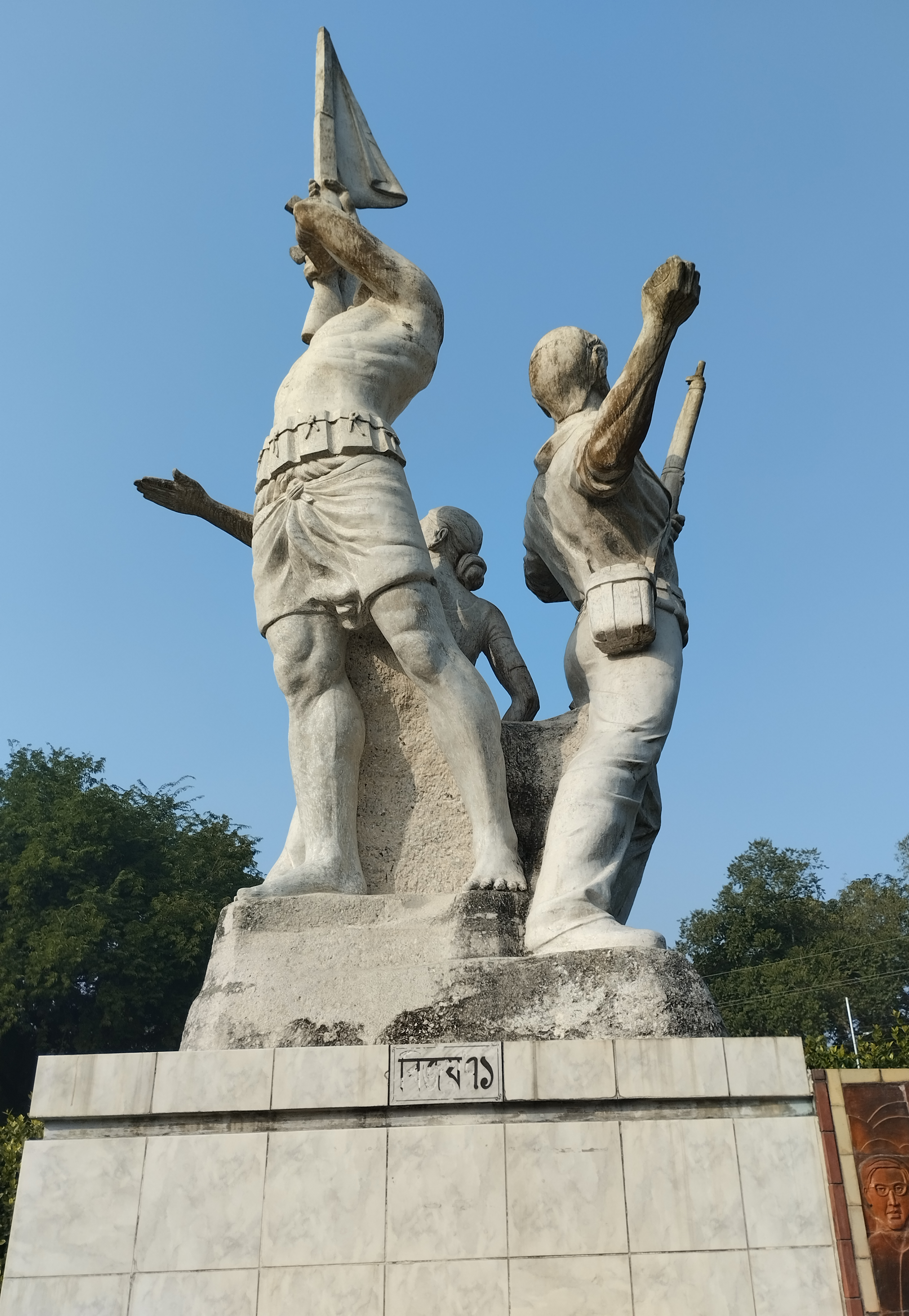

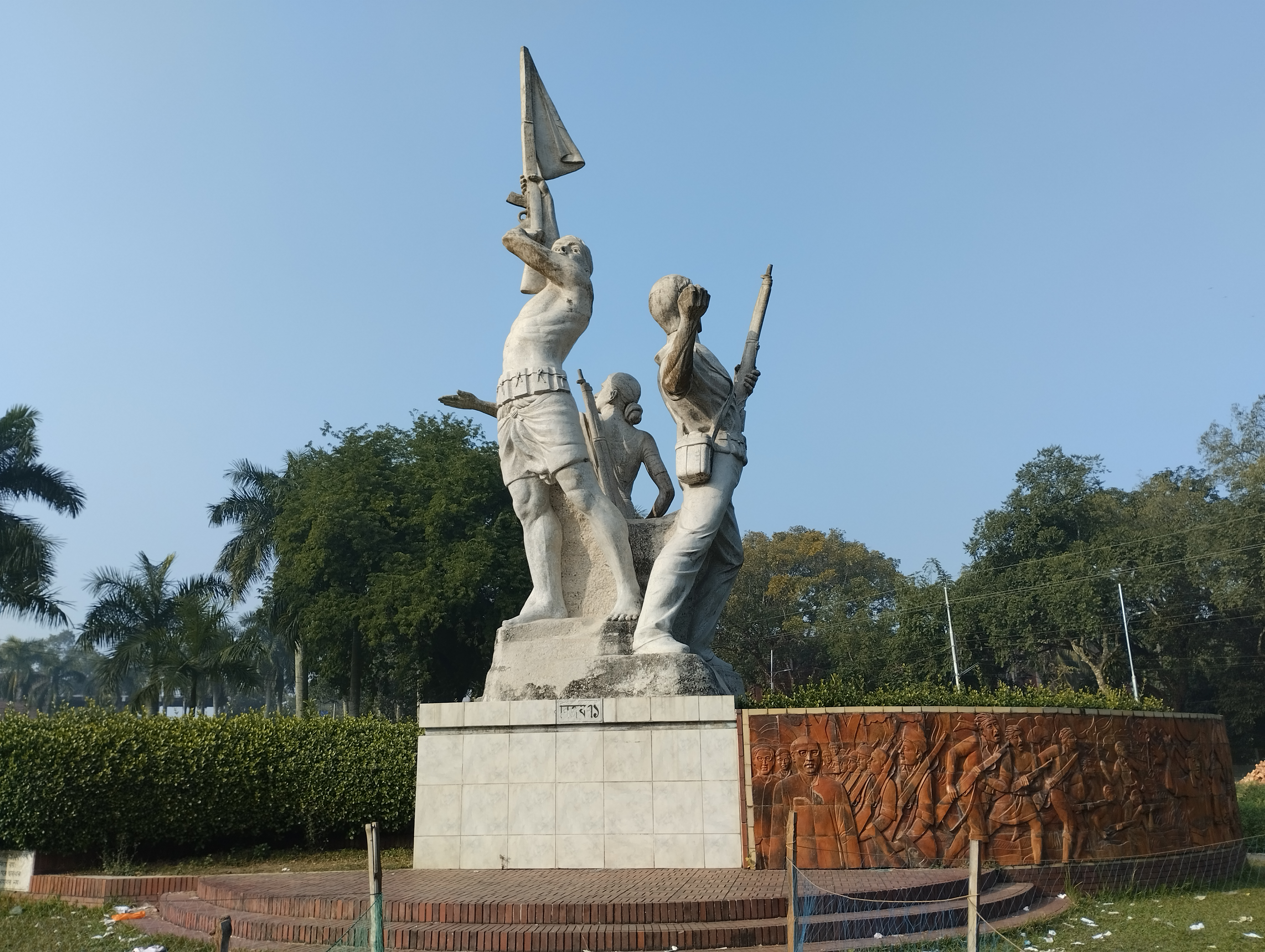

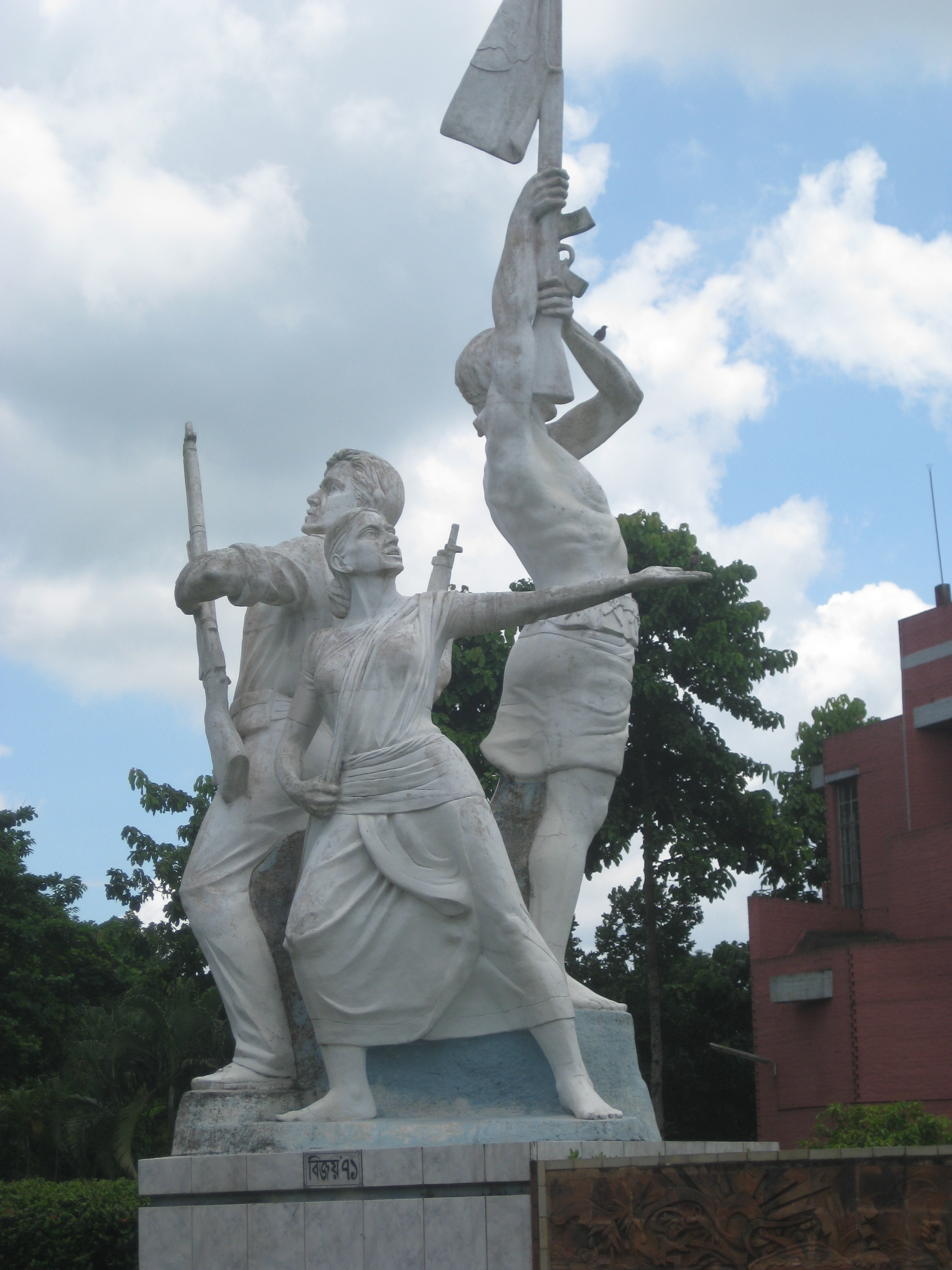

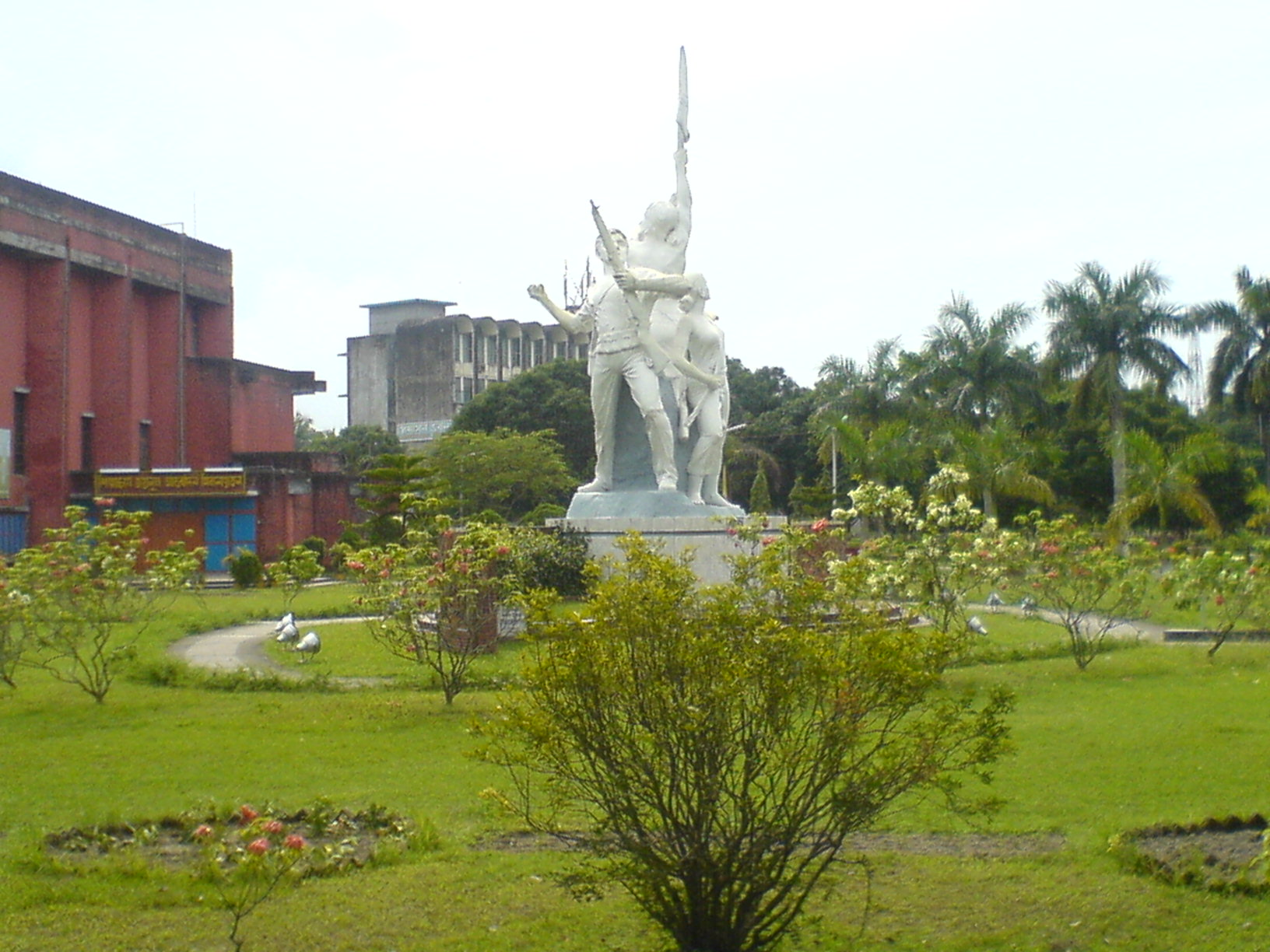
