= Bangladesh Finance and Investment Company Limited =

Financial Institute in Bangladesh

Bangladesh Finance Limited
- Formation: 1999
- Headquarters: Dhaka, Bangladesh
- Region served: Bangladesh
- Official language: Bengali
- Website: bd.finance

Bangladesh Finance Limited, also known as BD Finance or Bangladesh Finance, is a non-bank financial institution in Bangladesh. Manwar Hossain is the chairman Bangladesh Finance and Investment Company Limited and Md Kyser Hamid is the CEO and managing director.

Bangladesh Finance is listed on the Dhaka Stock Exchange.

== History ==
Bangladesh Finance and Investment Company Limited was established in 1999. It is a subsidiary of Anwar Group. It was incorporated on 10 May 1999 received its license on 22 December 1999. Anwar Hossain was the founding chairman of Bangladesh Finance and Investment Company Limited. Hossain was the founder of Anwar Group, The City Bank Limited, and City General Insurance Company Limited. It started its operations on 15 February 2000 with BDT 500 million authorized capital.

Mafizudddin Sarkar was the managing director of Bangladesh Finance and Investment Company Limited in 2015 when he was elected chairman of Bangladesh Leasing and Finance Companies' Association.

Tarik Morshed was the managing director of BD Finance in 2019. Md. Kyser Hamid was appointed CEO and managing director of Bangladesh Finance and Investment Company Limited in September 2020.

In April 2021, BD Finance signed an agreement with the United States-based Sovereign Infrastructure Group for investments worth US$2 billion. It received an AA− rating. Bangladesh Finance and Investment Company Limited was renamed to Bangladesh Finance Limited in April 2021.

Bangladesh Finance Limited experienced an eight percent decline in profit in 2022. It was recognized as having the second best financial statement issued by a non-bank financial institution by the Institute of Chartered Accountants of Bangladesh after IDLC Finance; and IPDC Finance was third.

Mahtab Uddin Ahmed, former CEO of Robi, joined BD Finance as a director in 2023. Fatema Begum, the first woman police officer and former additional inspector general of Bangladesh police, was appointed director of BD Finance. Its profit declined 75 percent in 2023 due to lower income from interest and a decrease in return on securities. It was one of the few non-banking financial institutions that was able to secure an increase in profit from July to September along with LankaBangla Finance PLC and Delta Brac Housing Finance Corporation. It received awards from Bangladesh Bank and Bangladesh Institute of Bank Management for contribution to sustainable financial investment.

== Subsidiary ==
- Bangladesh Finance Capital
