= Killing of Nahid Hossain =

2022 murder in Dhaka, Bangladesh

- Part of Violence of Bangladesh Chhatra League
- Location: 23°37′53″N 90°26′37″E; Nurjahan Super Market, New Market, Dhaka, Bangladesh
- Date: April 19, 2022 c. 12:45 pm (UTC+6)
- Victim: Nahid Hossain
- Perpetrator: Members of Bangladesh Chhatra League
- Charges: See the § Legal proceedings section

On 19 April 2022, Nahid Hossain, a courier delivery worker, died after being beaten during a clash between Dhaka College students and shopkeepers in the New Market area of Dhaka. The conflict began over a dispute at a local eatery and escalated into violent encounters involving students from the Bangladesh Chhatra League. Several people were injured as a result of the clashes. Following the incident, six Dhaka College students were identified as prime suspects. The trial has drawn significant attention and was still ongoing as of mid-2023.

== Background ==
The conflict, which began on the night of 18 April 2022, arose from a dispute between shopkeepers and students at a local eatery and quickly escalated into a large-scale confrontation. According to reports, members of the Chhatra League, the student wing of the Awami League, were involved in the violence, which resulted in several injuries. Hossain, who was passing by his workplace, was attacked by a group of assailants on suspicion of supporting the shopkeepers during the clash. The attackers, some of whom were armed with machetes and wore helmets, were identified through video footage.

== Incident ==
The clashes began after students were called to support a group involved in a dispute at two food shops near New Market. The fighting quickly escalated, resulting in violent encounters between students and shopkeepers throughout the night and into the next day. Over 50 people were injured in the confrontation. While traveling to work, Hossain was caught in the chaos. Video footage from the incident showed Hossain being attacked by a group of men wearing helmets and wielding machetes, leaving him critically injured. He was rushed to Dhaka Medical College Hospital but died from his injuries later that day. Another victim, Morsalin, a shop worker, also lost his life after being struck by a brick during the clash.

== Aftermath ==
=== Investigation and arrests ===
In the days following the incident, the Dhaka Metropolitan Police launched an investigation and reviewed CCTV footage to identify the attackers. Six Dhaka College students were named as prime suspects in Hossain's murder. The assailants were reportedly linked to the Chhatra League, the student wing of the ruling Awami League party. Among the accused was Bashar Emon, a second-year student in the Bangla department. Emon was identified as one of the primary attackers who struck Hossain with a machete. Police conducted multiple raids in the Dhaka College dormitories; however, the suspects evaded capture until late April.

Several suspects were subsequently arrested, and their involvement was confirmed through witness testimonies and video evidence. On 24 April, two of the four identified attackers were taken into custody. By 28 April, five Dhaka College students were remanded for two days for further questioning.

=== Legal proceedings ===
The legal process began shortly after the arrests, with the suspects charged with murder under the Bangladesh Penal Code.

As of mid-2023, the trial was still ongoing, with Emon and others being prosecuted. The case has drawn widespread attention due to the violent nature of the crime and the involvement of students affiliated with political groups. Authorities and the prosecution have sought the maximum penalty for those found guilty, as Hossain's death triggered a national response against the increasing violence associated with student political groups.

=== Institutional response ===
In response to the incident, Dhaka College formed a probe committee on 26 April to investigate whether its students were involved in the clashes that took place on 18 April. The college authorities stated that the committee was formed in accordance with academic regulations.

== See also ==
- Murder of Abrar Fahad
