= Hamidur Rahman (Bangladeshi politician) =

Bangladeshi politician

- হামিদুর রহমান
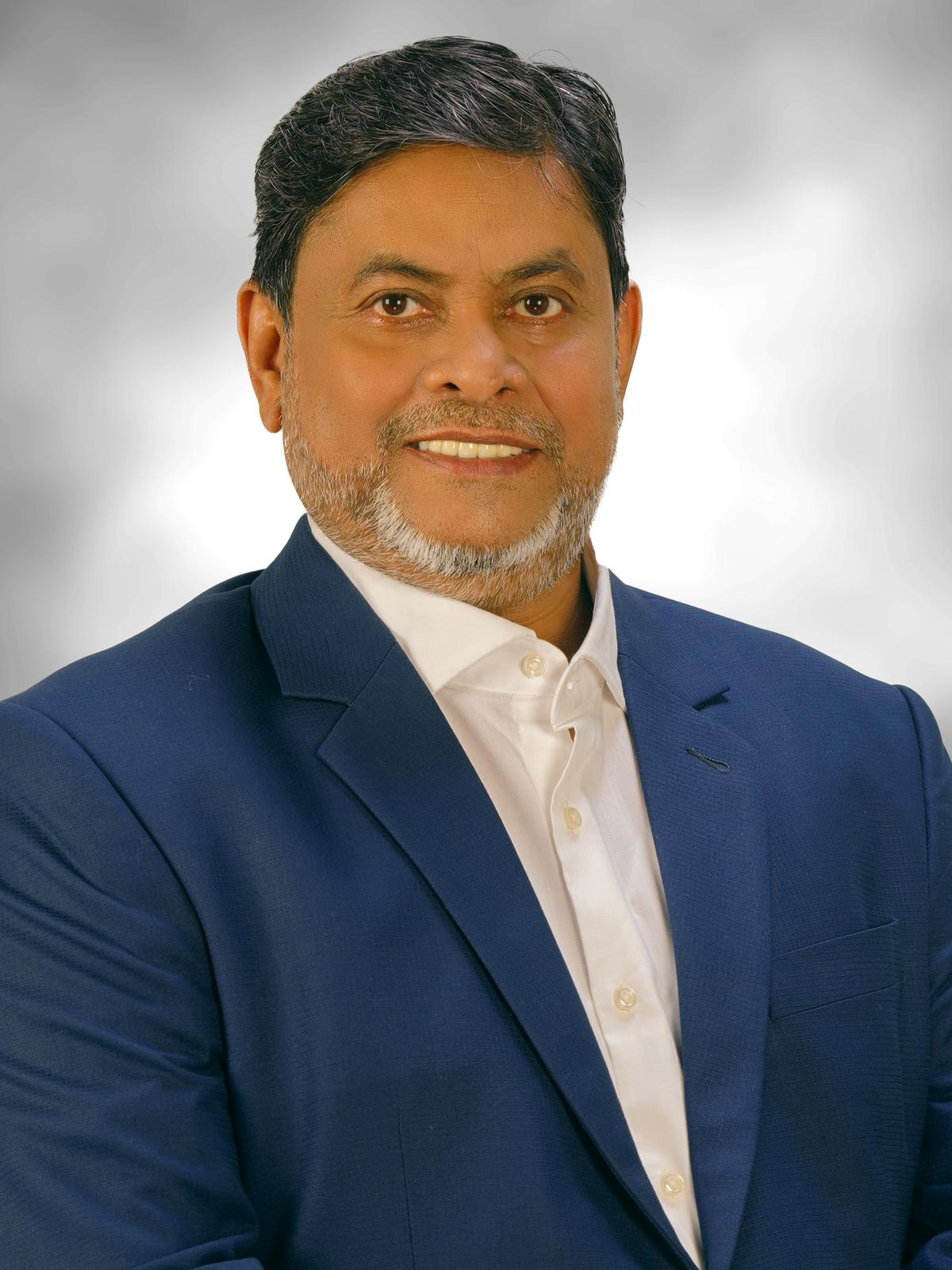

Member-elect of Parliament

Member, National Executive Committee of the Bangladesh Nationalist Party

Personal details
- Born: 20 January 1967 (age 59) Dhaka, Bangladesh (present-day Old Dhaka, Dhaka, Bangladesh)
- Party: Bangladesh Nationalist Party
- Parents: Golap Rahman (father); Marium Begum (mother)
- Education: Jagannath University
- Website: hamidurrahman.com
- Nickname: Hamid

Hamidur Rahman (Bengali: হামিদুর রহমান) (Bengali :হামিদুর রহমান; born 20 January 1967) is a Bangladeshi politician and a member of the Bangladesh Nationalist Party (BNP), a visionary leader, and a Member of Parliament for Dhaka-7. He is well known in the political arena for his honesty, foresight, and worker-friendly demeanour. Embracing the ideals of martyred President Ziaur Rahman and under the leadership of acting party chairman Tarique Rahman, Hamidur Rahman is relentlessly working to restore democracy and uphold the rights of the people a visionary leader, and a Jatiya Sangsad member-elect representing the Dhaka-7 constituency.

Hamidur Rahman won the 2026 Bangladeshi general election contesting at the Dhaka-7 constituency securing 104,666 votes while his nearest opponent Bangladesh Jamaat-e-Islami candidate Enayet Ullah received 98,483 votes.
