= Haji Mohammad Salim =

Bangladeshi politician

- হাজী মোহাম্মদ সেলিম
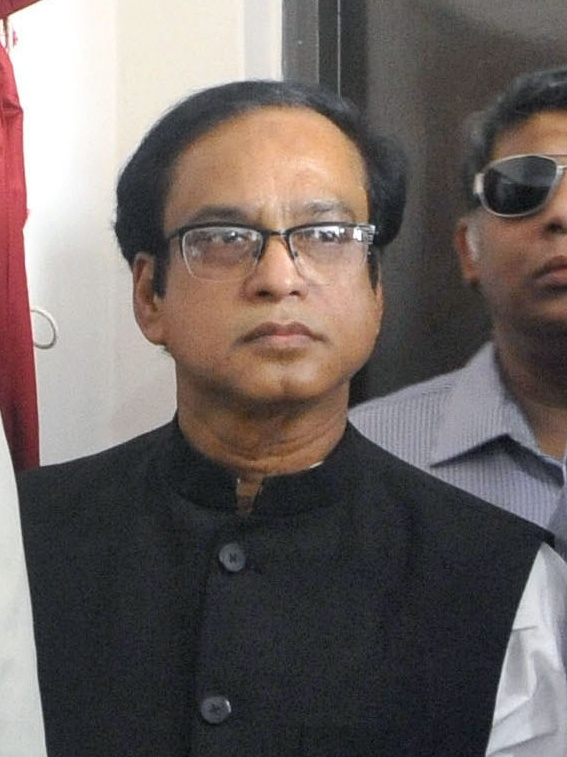
- Haji Mohammad Salim in 2017

Member of Parliament
- In office 29 January 2014 – 29 January 2024
- Preceded by: Mostofa Jalal Mohiuddin
- Succeeded by: Solaiman Salim
- Constituency: Dhaka-7
- In office 14 July 1996 – 13 July 2001
- Preceded by: Mir Shawkat Ali
- Succeeded by: Nasiruddin Ahmed Pintu
- Constituency: Dhaka-8

Personal details
- Born: 10 May 1958 (age 68) Dhaka, East Pakistan, Pakistan
- Party: Bangladesh Awami League
- Spouse: Gulshan Ara Begum (m. 1987; died 2020)
- Children: Solaiman; Irfan

Haji Mohammad Salim (born 10 May 1958) is a Bangladesh Awami League politician and a former Jatiya Sangsad member representing the Dhaka-7 and Dhaka-8 constituencies.

Salim was arrested on 2 September 2024 from Bangshal area in Dhaka by the detectives from Dhaka Metropolitan Police. He was placed on a five-day remand for interrogating in connection with the murder of Khalid Hasan Saifullah, a student at Ideal College, during the 2024 Bangladesh quota reform movement.

== Early life ==
Salim was born on 10 May 1958. He studied up to grade nine.

== Career ==
Salim was a Bangladesh Nationalist Party (BNP) ward councillor. He had left the party and joined Awami League as he had failed to secure their nomination for the 1996 national election. He won the election and was elected to parliament from Dhaka-8 (Lalbagh area) as an Awami League candidate. He served in the Treasury Bench of the Jatiya Sangsad. He owns Madina Group; Tiger brand cement is one of its products. His rival and BNP member of parliament, Nasiruddin Ahmed Pintu, was his protégé.

On 5 January 2014, Salim was elected to parliament as an independent candidate. The Daily Star described him as a "rebel Awami League" candidate. He was the joint secretary of Dhaka City unit of Awami League. He beat Mostafa Jalal Mohiuddin, the Awami League candidate in the election. In April 2014, he faced contempt of court charges after he obstructed a mobile court drive evicting illegal structures around Lalbagh Fort.

In 2015, Salim tried to contest the Dhaka South mayoral election but did not receive approval from his party. He extended his support to the Awami League candidate Sayeed Khokon.

In 2018, Salim was elected to the parliament from Dhaka-7 as a candidate of Awami League.

In June 2016, Salim was elected president of Rahmatganj MFS and served until his arrest in 2024.

In December 2019, Salim collected nomination forms from Awami League to contest Dhaka South Mayoral elections. He lost the nomination to Sheikh Fazle Noor Taposh, who went on to win the election.

On 26 November 2023, Awami League announced the final list of its 298 candidates to contest the 2024 national election which did not include Salim. Instead his son, Mohammad Solaiman Selim, got the nomination.

=== Charges and convictions ===
On 25 March 2004, six cases were filed against Salim following clashes between Awami League and BNP activists.

In September 2007, The Anti-Corruption Commission (ACC) filed two corruption cases against Salim. In April 2008, a special court sentenced Selim to 10 years' imprisonment for amassing wealth illegally and another 3 years for concealing information in his wealth statement submitted to the ACC. The judge also issued orders to confiscate all his ill-gotten assets worth Tk 270 million. The court also sentenced his wife, Gulshan Ara (d. 2020), to 3 years' imprisonment for abetting her husband. Salim filed an appeal with the High Court in October 2009 against the verdict. Following the appeal, in January 2011, the High Court acquitted him of the corruption case. The ACC then appealed against the HC verdict to the Appellate Division of the Supreme Court and in January 2015, it scrapped the High Court verdict and directed to hold a rehearing of Salim's appeal and to dispose of the appeal again. In March 2021, the High Court upheld the verdict to 10 years' imprisonment in the corruption case but acquitted him of the charge of concealing wealth information in which he was sentenced to 3 years' imprisonment. On 10 February 2022, the High Court upheld the lower court's judgement convicting and sentencing Salim to 10 years in prison. He was asked to surrender to the trial court in 30 days. On 22 May, he surrendered to the court and sought bail in the case but it was rejected and he was sent to the prison. A day later, he was taken to Bangabandhu Sheikh Mujib Medical University for treatment. On 6 June 2022, the Supreme Court refused him to grant bail on the case. On 17 January 2023, he was released from prison cell of Bangabandhu Sheikh Mujib Medical University (BSMMU) based on the bail order on 6 December 2022 issued by Appellate Division panel headed by Chief Justice Hasan Foez Siddique.

In May 2009, Salim was acquitted in the murder case of Abdul Hannan, an activist of Bangladesh Jatiotabadi Jubo Dal, the youth front of BNP by Speedy Trial Tribunal-1. In July 2009, after Awami League came to power the government decided to withdraw 21 criminal cases against Salim. The government stated that the cases were filed those were "politically motivated" and meant for "harassment". He had a total of 120 cases against him.

In September 2011, the government of Bangladesh withdrew 105 cases against Salim. In February 2012, a case over assaulting police officers in 2004 was withdrawn by the government.

In February 2019, a number of buildings owned by Salim were demolished by Bangladesh Water Development Board for encroaching on riverbanks. His some other buildings were demolished by Bangladesh Inland Water Transport Authority; following its chairman, Commodore Mohammad Mozammel Haque, got transferred to a different location.

Salim was convicted on a corruption case for amassing wealth illegally, filed by the Anti-Corruption Commission in 2007. He began serving his 10-year prison sentence in May 2022. On 17 January 2023, he was released from prison cell of Bangabandhu Sheikh Mujib Medical University (BSMMU) based on the bail order on 6 December 2022 issued by Appellate Division panel headed by Chief Justice Hasan Foez Siddique.

== Controversies ==
In 2005, on behalf of the former President, the deputy commissioner of Dhaka district allocated 100 decimals of land at Swarighat in Chawkbazar to Government Bhadir High School for constructing school buildings. However, Salim, along with his associates, soon seized the land. Despite the district administration freeing the land from his control three times, Salim repeatedly reoccupied it. Even after losing a legal battle in a Dhaka court, he continued to hold onto the land, where he eventually established a filling station and several storehouses, with the land's value estimated at around Tk 1,000 million.

Selim is managing director of MADINA GROUP which he runs by the illegal money he earned during his reign as an MP. Mr Selim is also criticized because of violating labour laws and making his employee work forcefully beyond the working hour without paying. His office gate is locked after he enters the office and lets no one to get out of the office building at least before 9 PM. He does it forcefully and the employees can't say anything about it due to terror. Qualified employees leave the job as soon as they get other opportunity and the other people stay but with extreme dissatisfaction. In February 2014, Jagannath University students organized protests demanding Salim return their dormitory that they accused him of illegally occupying. He denied the allegation and asked for evidence. He had allegedly occupied the Tibet Hall, demolished it, and built a market in its place.

In May 2016, Salim encroached upon 4.75 acres of cropland valued at Tk 50 million in Kolapara, Patuakhali, with the land allegedly seized by representatives of his Madina Group. Local miscreants, under the direction of Madina Group, forcibly took over the land, erected an embankment around it, and began filling it with sand. Despite repeated appeals to the administration, the landowners were unable to reclaim their property, as they were intimidated by hired goons and the influence of Madina Group. On 14 November 2020, the dispossessed farmers initiated efforts to recover their land.

On 8 June 2019, Salim's man demolished Jahaj Bari, an architecturally significant historical building in Old Dhaka, on the night of Eid al-Fitr. The demolition had been previously stopped following the filling of a general diary by Taimur Islam of Urban Study Group. He was accused of endangering several historical buildings. Despite regulations prohibiting construction within 250 meters of heritage sites, Salim built high-rises, jeopardizing these structures. His land grabs include the demolition of the Nicolas Pogose house in Armanitola during the COVID-19 lockdown, despite a High Court order to preserve heritage sites.

Salim's son, Irfan Selim, was arrested after he was accused of physically assaulting a Bangladesh Navy lieutenant and his wife on 25 October 2020. Irfan was jailed for 1 year after illegal firearms and alcohol were recovered from his house.
