= Anwar Group of Industries =

One of the largest Bangladeshi conglomerate

- Type: Private
- Industry: Conglomerate
- Founded: 1834
- Headquarters: Floor 13, Baitul Hossain Building, 27 Dilkusha, Motijheel C/A, Dhaka 1000, Dhaka, Bangladesh
- Key people: Anwar Hossain (Founder Chairman), Manwar Hossain (Group Chairman), Hossain Mehmood (Group Vice Chairman), Hossain Khaled (Group Managing Director) Furkaan N Hossain (DMD), Waeez R Hossain (DMD), Faizah Mehmood (DMD)
- Products: Building Materials, Real Estate, Aotumobile, Textiles, Furniture & Home Decor
- Revenue: ▲US$400 million (2019)
- Number of employees: 14,000 (2021)
- Website: www.anwargroup.com

Anwar Group of Industries is a Bangladeshi conglomerate. It consists of 18 subsidiaries that are servicing consumer goods, steels, cement, textile, finance and automotive industry. Manwar Hossain is the Chairman of Anwar Group.

== History ==
Anwar Group started as a hides and skins business in 1834, founded by Lakku Mia, an entrepreneur in British India. Hossain Akhtar was the first chairman of the group.

In 1985, Anwar Galvanizing Limited started production of galvanized iron fittings, becoming the first company to make them in Bangladesh.

In June 2009, AG Automobiles became the official partner of Ford Motor Company in Bangladesh and launched the first Ford showroom in Uttara.

In 2015, Anwar Cement announced plans to more than double the sales of cement sheets from 1 billion BDT to 2.5 billion BDT.

On 11 April 2021, Bd Finance of Anwar Group signed an agreement with Sovereign Infrastructure Group at the Bangladesh Embassy to the United States. Anwar Galvanizing announced plans to double their production through investing 270 BDT in the project.

Anwar Hossain was the chairman of the group. After his death on 17 August 2021, his son, Manwar Hossain, replaced him as chairman of Anwar Group on 14 September 2021. He had been the managing director of the company before the death of his father. In December 2021, Toledo Motors Limited became the official partner of Jeep in Bangladesh and launched their showroom in Uttara.

== List of companies ==
Consumer goods

- A1 Polymer Ltd.
- Anwar Galvanizing Ltd.
- Jute Spinning Mills Ltd/ Anwar Jute Division.
- Athena’s Furniture & Home décor

Cement

- Anwar Cement Ltd.
- Anwar Cement Sheet Ltd.

Textile

- Anwar Textile Ltd.
- Mahmud Industries Private Ltd.
- Anwar Silk Mills Ltd.
- Hossain Dyeing & Printing Mills Ltd.

Steel

- Anwar Ispat Ltd.

Real estate

- Anwar Landmark Ltd.
- Anwar Infrastructure Ltd.

Finance

- City Insurance Company Ltd.
- Bangladesh Finance And Investment Company Ltd. (BD Finance)
- BD Finance Capital Holdings Ltd.
- BD Securities.
- City General Insurance Co. Ltd

Automobile

- AG Automobiles Ltd. (AG Auto)
- Toledo Motors Ltd (authorized distributor of Jeep in Bangladesh)

== See also ==
- List of companies of Bangladesh
