= 1999 JU Anti-Rape Movement =

Student Protests in Bangladesh Against Rape

1998-1999 Jahangirnagar University anti-rape movement a series of mass student protests in Bangladesh directed against serial sexual violence and institutional impunity at Jahangirnagar University (JU). Initiated in August 1998, the movement started as response to multiple allegations of rape and sexual harassment committed by leaders of the Bangladesh Chhatra League (BCL), the student wing of Awami League.

Although a university fact-finding committee confirmed at least 20 incidents of rape and 300 incidents of sexual harassment, the university issued only academic expulsions in October 1998 without following up by filing criminal charges against them. This condition allowed the perpetrators to maintain control over the campus and made thousand of students, the majority of whom were female in 2 August 1999 physically ousted the accused from the university grounds and held mass demonstrations on the Dhaka-Aricha Highway to demand legal prosecution, though the perpetrators avoided criminal punishment because their political connections to the Awami League.

== Background ==
Since the winning of the Awami League in the June 1996 Bangladeshi general election, the Bangladesh Chhatra League (BCL), which is the student wing of the party, has been trying to control of student organization and union of the universities in Bangladesh.On 18 October 1997, Ananda Kumar Ghosh, one of the Chhatra League leaders, was shot and killed during an internal faction feud within the organization at Jahangirnagar University (JU) between two faction under the leadership of Ajay Kar Khokon and a faction which was led by Sheikh Nuruzzaman.

In 1998, nine members of the BCL at Jahangirnagar University were expelled for their involvement in the killing of Ghosh including the person who held the position of general secretary of the unit at the university. Then, the position of general secretary of the JU unit was replaced by Jasimuddin Manik.On August 17, 1998, it was reported that three female students of JU had been raped by a leader from BCL of the university. In response, the students held their first protest at 19 August 1998.

Afterward, on 27 September 1998, a fact-finding committee confirmed at least 20 incidents of rape and 300 incidents of sexual harassment happened at the university. Seven suspects were identified, all of whom were leaders of the BCL. The JU General Students Unity keep demanding that the university need to take an action where it was later denied by Alauddin Ahmed, vice chair of JU where he said that the victim need to lodge the complaint herself. The Media keeps asking to know the identities the victim to which the protesters responded by saying all of them. Manik received a permanent expulsion from JU, two other suspects received two-year expulsions, two received three-year expulsions, and one person received a suspended one-year expulsion.

Even though the expulsion happened in October 1998, because the university only expelled them without filing any criminal case toward them, the rivals of group whom the suspect belong attacked the university and took control of it, which was followed by another attack by suspect's group to retake the control of the university in July 1999.

== Protest ==
Because the suspect still remained in the university, on 2 August 1999, the group were ousted from the campus by the protestors, involving thousands of students, the majority of whom were female. On 3 August 1999, two hundred students also demanded their arrest.

Few students also running a human chain demanded that the suspect was punished under the laws of the country on 5 August 1999. On 30 January 2000, a Daily Star article reported that the suspect were not punished because of their connection to the AL as ruling party.On 16 October 2008, all of the perpetrators' faces were published in Shaptahik 2000.
