= Dhaka-8 =

Constituency of Bangladesh's Jatiya Sangsad

Coordinates: 23.73°N 90.41°E

- Constituency for the Jatiya Sangsad
- District: Dhaka District
- Division: Dhaka Division
- Electorate: 275,471 (2026)

Current constituency
- Created: 1973
- Party: Bangladesh Nationalist Party
- Member: Mirza Abbas
- ← 180 Dhaka-7 182 Dhaka-9 →

Dhaka-8 is a constituency represented in the Jatiya Sangsad (National Parliament) of Bangladesh since 2026 by Mirza Abbas of the Bangladesh Nationalist Party.

== Boundaries ==
The constituency encompasses Dhaka South City Corporation wards 8 through 13, and 19 through 21.

== History ==
The constituency was created for the first general elections in newly independent Bangladesh, held in 1973.

Ahead of the 2008 general election, the Election Commission redrew constituency boundaries to reflect population changes revealed by the 2001 Bangladesh census. The 2008 redistricting altered the boundaries of the constituency.

== Members of Parliament ==
Election	Member	Party
1973	K. M. Shamsul Huda	Awami League
1979	Md. Abdul Hai	Bangladesh Nationalist Party
Major Boundary Changes
1986	Mohammad Harun ar Rashid	Jatiya Party
1988	Anwar Hossain	Jatiya Party
1991	Mir Shawkat Ali	Bangladesh Nationalist Party
Feb 1996	Mir Shawkat Ali	Bangladesh Nationalist Party
Jun 1996	Haji Mohammad Salim	Awami League
2001	Nasiruddin Ahmed Pintu	Bangladesh Nationalist Party
Major Boundary Changes
2008	Rashed Khan Menon	Workers Party of Bangladesh
2014	Rashed Khan Menon	Workers Party of Bangladesh
2018	Rashed Khan Menon	Workers Party of Bangladesh
2024	AFM Bahauddin Nasim	Awami League
2026	Mirza Abbas	Bangladesh Nationalist Party

== Elections ==
=== Elections in the 2020s ===
General Election 2026: Dhaka-8
Party	Candidate	Votes	%	±%
BNP	Mirza Abbas	59,366	50.5	N/A
NCP	Nasiruddin Patwary	54,127	46.0	N/A
IAB	Kefayet Ullah	1,436	1.2	N/A
JP(E)	Md. Juber Alam Khan	731	0.6	N/A
CPB	Tridip Kumar Saha	714	0.6	N/A
GOP	Meghna Alam	608	0.5	N/A
BIF	S M Sarowar	326	0.3	N/A
Janotar Dol	Md. Golam Sarowar	129	0.1	N/A
BSD (Marxist)	A H M Rafiquzzaman Akanda	96	0.1	N/A
BSM	Md. Russel Kabir	78	0.1	N/A
BJSD	Mirza Abbas Uddin Ahmed	56	0.0	N/A
Majority		5,239	4.5	N/A
Turnout		117,667	42.7	N/A
Registered electors		275,471		
BNP gain from AL				

=== Elections in the 2010s ===
General Election 2018: Dhaka-8
Party	Candidate	Votes	%	±%
WPB	Rashed Khan Menon	139,538	52.8	N/A
BNP	Mirza Abbas	38,717	14.6	N/A
IAB	Md. Abul Kashem	1,540	0.9	N/A
BSD	Shampa Basu	521	0.3	N/A
Majority		100,821	38.1	N/A
Turnout		182,959	69.1	N/A
Registered electors		264,664		
WPB hold				

Rashed Khan Menon was re-elected unopposed in the 2014 general election after opposition parties withdrew their candidacies in a boycott of the election.

=== Elections in the 2000s ===
General Election 2008: Dhaka-8
Party	Candidate	Votes	%	±%
WPB	Rashed Khan Menon	97,841	59.6	+59.5
BNP	Habib-un Nobi Khan Sohel	63,860	38.9	−9.3
IAB	AKM Arfan Khan	840	0.5	N/A
Bangladesh Kalyan Party	Syed Mohammed Ibrahim	688	0.4	N/A
BKA	Mojibur Rahman Hamidi	294	0.2	+0.4
BSD	Md. Rajekujjaman	229	0.2	N/A
BDB	Md. Safiqul Islam	195	0.1	N/A
Independent	Mrs. Nasrin Anwar	89	0.1	N/A
Gano Front	Nur Alam Bikhato	61	0.0	N/A
BJP	Kazi Mominul Haq	60	0.0	N/A
Independent	Abdul Bari	45	0.0	N/A
Jatiya Samajtantrik Dal-JSD	Md. Asadujjaman	28	0.0	N/A
Majority		33,981	20.7	+20.1
Turnout		164,230	73.1	+8.6
WPB gain from BNP				

General Election 2001: Dhaka-8
Party	Candidate	Votes	%	±%
BNP	Nasiruddin Ahmed Pintu	89,789	48.2	+11.0
AL	Haji Mohammad Salim	88,697	47.6	−1.8
IJOF	Saifuddin Ahmed	5,403	2.9	N/A
BKA	Qari Shah Ahmadullah	1,201	0.6	N/A
Independent	Firoz Khan	560	0.3	N/A
WPB	Kamrul Hasan Riday	205	0.1	N/A
JSD	Md. Abdul Khaleque	105	0.1	N/A
Jatiya Party (M)	Hannan Chowdhury	91	0.0	N/A
Independent	Maububur Rahman Faisal	52	0.0	N/A
Independent	Md. Jahangir Alam Masud	51	0.0	N/A
Independent	Md. Mafizul Islam	27	0.0	N/A
Majority		1,092	0.6	−11.7
Turnout		186,181	64.5	−5.3
BNP gain from AL				

=== Elections in the 1990s ===
General Election June 1996: Dhaka-8
Party	Candidate	Votes	%	±%
AL	Haji Mohammad Salim	77,642	49.4	+13.5
BNP	Abul Hasnat	58,367	37.2	−19.0
JP(E)	Saifuddin Ahmed	14,022	8.9	+7.4
Jamaat	Sabbir Ahmed	3,486	2.2	−0.2
IOJ	Jamal Naser Chowdhury	1,878	1.2	N/A
Zaker Party	Zakir Hossain Khan	812	0.5	−0.3
Jatiya Samajtantrik Dal-JSD	Sheikh Rashid Mahmud	508	0.3	N/A
NAP	A. H. Shahab Uddin	352	0.2	N/A
Bangladesh Muslim League (Jamir Ali)	Md. Rashidul Islam	39	0.0	N/A
Majority		19,275	12.3	−8.0
Turnout		157,106	69.8	+22.3
AL gain from BNP				

General Election 1991: Dhaka-8
Party	Candidate	Votes	%	±%
BNP	Mir Shawkat Ali	53,651	56.2	
AL	Mostafa Jalal Mohiuddin	34,285	35.9	
Jamaat	Sabbir Ahmed	2,318	2.4	
BKA	Ahmadullah Ashraf	1,447	1.5	
JP(E)	Gulzar Hossain	1,398	1.5	
Zaker Party	Amanullah Azim	786	0.8	
Jatiya Tarun Sangha	Md. Fazlul Haq	417	0.4	
JSD	Abul Hasib Khan	384	0.4	
Ideal Party	Syed Kamal Zaidi	251	0.3	
Bangladesh Bekar Samaj	Md. Hasan	147	0.2	
Bangladesh Manobatabadi Dal	B. H. Rana	122	0.1	
Independent	A. Rashid	112	0.1	
Bangladesh Muslim League (Yusuf)	Sk. Abdul Malek	78	0.1	
Jatiya Samajtantrik Dal-JSD	Humayun Kabir Hiru	70	0.1	
Majority		19,366	20.3	
Turnout		95,466	47.5	
BNP gain from				
