= Nasiruddin Ahmed Pintu =

Bangladeshi politician

- নাসিরউদ্দিন আহমেদ পিন্টু

Member of Parliament
- In office 1 October 2001 – 29 October 2006
- Preceded by: Haji Mohammad Salim
- Succeeded by: Rashed Khan Menon
- Constituency: Dhaka-8

Personal details
- Born: 1 September 1967
- Died: 3 May 2015 (aged 47) Rajshahi, Bangladesh
- Party: Bangladesh Nationalist Party

Nasiruddin Ahmed Pintu (1 September 1967 – 3 May 2015) was a Bangladesh Nationalist Party politician. He was a member of parliament for the Dhaka-8 constituency.

== Career ==
Pintu was the president of Jatiyatabadi Chhatra Dal in the 1990s. He was the organising secretary of the Dhaka unit of the Bangladesh Nationalist Party. He was elected to parliament from Lalbagh, Dhaka in 2001. In 2003, the Bangladesh Nationalist Party government tried to withdraw a murder charge against his brother but was denied by the judge.

Pintu was sentenced to life in prison for his involvement in the Bangladesh Rifles Mutiny in 2009. He was accused of helping the mutineers by providing them with transport. He tried to compete in the Dhaka South City Corporation. His nomination was cancelled by Bangladesh Election Commission for failure to provide enough information to prove his innocence as he was accused of helping the BDR mutineers.

== Personal life ==
Pintu was married to Nasima Akhtar Kalpana. She was made an executive committee member of Bangladesh Nationalist Party in 2016.

== Death ==
Pintu died while he was in prison serving a life-term on 3 May 2015. He was declared dead in Rajshahi Medical college and Hospital.
