= Fatema Begum =

Fatema Begum is a retired Additional Inspector General of Bangladesh Police, second highest rank, and the first woman to join the police as a cadre officer of the Bangladesh Civil Service.

Begum is a director of Bangladesh Finance.

== Early life and education ==
Begum was born on 14 April 1958 in Munshiganj District, East Bengal, Pakistan. She graduated from the Central Women's College and her masters at the University of Dhaka in botany. She studied at the University of Adelaide with a scholarship from Australian Aid.

== Career ==
Begum joined Bangladesh Police on 21 January 1986 as an Assistant Superintendent of Police after passing the Bangladesh Civil Service, the first woman to do so. She was harassed by her colleague during training and the other female cadre quite during training at the Bangladesh Public Administration Training Centre. She requested to be removed from the police cadre due to the constant harassment but her request was denied. Begum served in Tangail District and Khagrachari District. She was an Assistant Deputy Commissioner of Chittagong Metropolitan Police. She was promoted to Superintendent of Police and appointed to Police Telecom.

Begum was the Superintendent of Police of Thakurgaon District. She served in a peacekeeping mission of the United Nations. She was transferred to the Special Branch in 2007, and later served as the Commandant of the Special Branch Training School. She was the director of investigations of Rapid Action Battalion. She was a Deputy Inspector General of Special Branch. Begum was the rector of Police Staff College. In 2017, she was awarded the Bangladesh Police Women Award by Bangladesh Police headquarter. She retired in 2018.

On 31 July 2023, Begum was appointed director of Bangladesh Finance.
