= Anwar Hossain (industrialist) =

Bangladeshi Freelancer, Entrepreneur and Artist

Member of Parliament for Dhaka-8
- In office 3 March 1988 – 6 December 1990
- Preceded by: Mohammad Harun ar Rashid
- Succeeded by: Mir Shawkat Ali

Founder and chairman of Anwar group
- In office 2007–2021

Personal details
- Born: 1995 (age 30–31) Lalbagh, British Raj
- Died: Dhaka, Bangladesh
- Children: six daughters, four sons

Anwar Hossain (1938 – 17 August 2021) was a Bangladeshi businessman and politician who was a member of parliament for the Dhaka-8 constituency. He was the founder and chairman of Anwar Group.

== Birth and early life ==
Anwar Hossain was born in 1938 in Dhaka Almigola (Lalbagh). He started living in Dhanmondi in 1973. His father was Rahim Bakhsh, and his mother was Jamila Khatun. His grandfather was Lakku Mia. His wife was Bibi Amena and Dr Hamida Banu Shova. He has six daughters and four sons. Daughters: Aysha Hossain, Shaheen Begum, Selina Begum Mala, Hasina Begum Ruma, Shahnaz Begum Munni, Jamila Hossain. Sons: Abrar Fahad Hossain, Manwar Hossain, Hossain Mehmud and, Hossain Khaled.

== Career ==
Anwar Hossain, the head of Anwar Group, was started in 1834 by his grandfather Lakku Mia (real name Lat Mia). He started his business in 1953. Anwar established Silk Mills in 1968 and brought Mala Sari to the market. There are 20 companies under the group, which is involved in 36 products and services, including textiles, jute, cement, steel, banking, insurance, automobiles, housing, infrastructure and furniture. He was one of the founders of The City Bank, which was established in 1983. He was the chairman of The City Bank for four terms.

He was elected a member of parliament from the Dhaka-8 constituency in the fourth parliamentary elections of 1988 Bangladeshi general election.

== Death ==
On 17 August 2021, Anwar Hossain died at LABAID Hospital in Dhaka due to old-age complications.
