= Murder of Biswajit Das =

2012 murder in Dhaka, Bangladesh

- Part of Violence of Bangladesh Chhatra League
- Location: 23°48′15″N 90°24′55″E; Dhaka, Bangladesh
- Date: 9 December 2012; 13 years ago c. 9:00 am (UTC+6)
- Victim: Biswajit Das
- Litigation: See trial

On 9 December 2012, Biswajit Das, a tailor from Dhaka, Bangladesh, was murdered by members of the Bangladesh Chhatra League (BCL), the student wing of the Awami League. That morning, the opposition 18 Party Alliance had called for a nationwide road blockade. As Das was on his way to his shop, located in Shankhari Bazaar in Old Dhaka, one or more small explosives detonated near an anti-blockade procession organized by BCL activists from Jagannath University.

== Background ==
Biswajit Das was a 24-year-old tailor from Dhaka born to Ananta Chandra Das and Kalpana Rani Das. He owned a tailoring shop in Shankhari Bazaar, Old Dhaka, and was known for his peaceful nature, avoiding political involvement and demonstrations.

== Murder ==
On 9 December 2012, the 18 Party Alliance called for an anti-government blockade. Around 9:00 am, a group of opposition lawyers led a procession from the Old Dhaka Judge Court in support of the blockade. As they approached Victoria Park, a bomb exploded.

Activists from the Bangladesh Chhatra League units of Jagannath University and Kabi Nazrul Government College attacked the protesting lawyers. The lawyers attempted to flee, and in the chaos, Das, a bystander, ran for safety.

He first took shelter on the second floor of a nearby dental clinic. The group mistook Das for an opposition supporter and chased him from near Bahadur Shah Park into a nearby building. They attacked him with machetes, iron bars, and hockey sticks, and struck him with an iron rod.

Severely injured, Das tried to escape into another building, but his attackers pursued him. His clothes were torn and his body was drenched in blood. Despite his injuries, he attempted to run again, but the assault continued. Eventually, he collapsed.

Some passersby tried to take him to National Hospital, but the attackers blocked their way. Das attempted to escape but fell down at Shankhari Bazaar Road. A rickshaw-puller took Das to Mitford Hospital, where he died shortly after from his wounds.

The daytime murder was captured live on television and sparked national outrage. Within days, Jagannath University expelled three students and revoked the certificates of two others for alleged involvement in the murder. The following week, the university expelled four more students.

== Aftermath ==
By 25 December, seven suspects were in police custody. An eighth man was arrested on 26 May 2013. The eight were among twenty-one people indicted on 2 June for Das's murder. All were activists of the Jagannath University unit of the BCL. Their trial started on 14 July. All twenty-one were found guilty on 18 December 2013. Eight were sentenced to death and thirteen were sentenced to life in prison. Thirteen, including two of those sentenced to death, were convicted in absentia and, as of August 2017, had not been apprehended.

In its 2012 Country Reports on Human Rights Practices, the United States Department of State cited Das's murder as an example of political violence in connection with general strikes in Bangladesh.

== Trial and sentencing ==
Biswajit murder case
Serial	Name of accused	Court verdict	Appeal verdict	Current status
1	Saiful Islam	Death sentence	Acquitted (11 July 2017)	Free
2	Kaiyum Mia	Death sentence	Acquitted (11 July 2017)	Free
3	G M Rasheduzzaman alias Shaon	Death sentence	Life imprisonment	Incarcerated
4	Mahfuzur Rahman alias Nahid	Death sentence	Life imprisonment	Incarcerated
5	Imdadul Haque alias Emdad	Death sentence	Life imprisonment	Incarcerated
6	Rafiqul Islam alias Shakil	Death sentence	Death sentence	Incarcerated
7	Rajan Talukder	Death sentence	Death sentence	Fugitive
8	Nure Alam	Death sentence	Life imprisonment	Fugitive
9	A H M Kibria	Life imprisonment	Acquitted (11 July 2017)	Free
10	Golam Mostafa	Life imprisonment	Acquitted (11 July 2017)	Free
11	Khondaker Yunus Ali	Life imprisonment		Incarcerated (31 October 2022)
12	Tareq Bin Zohar Tamal	Life imprisonment		Incarcerated (25 June 2018)
13	Alauddin	Life imprisonment		Incarcerated (15 July 2022)
14	Obaidul Kader Tahsin	Life imprisonment		Fugitive
15	Imran Hossain	Life imprisonment		Incarcerated (10 August 2021)
16	Azizur Rahman Aziz	Life imprisonment		Fugitive
17	Al Amin Sheikh	Life imprisonment		Fugitive
18	Rafiqul Islam	Life imprisonment		Fugitive
19	Monirul Haque Pavel	Life imprisonment		Fugitive
20	Kamrul Hasan	Life imprisonment		Fugitive
21	Mosharraf Hossain	Life imprisonment		Fugitive
