= Dhaka-7 =

Constituency of Bangladesh's Jatiya Sangsad

Coordinates: 23.72°N 90.39°E

- Constituency for the Jatiya Sangsad
- District: Dhaka District
- Division: Dhaka Division
- Electorate: 479,376 (2026)

Current constituency
- Created: 1973
- Party: Bangladesh Nationalist Party
- Member: Hamidur Rahman
- ← 179 Dhaka-6 181 Dhaka-8 →

Dhaka-7 is a constituency represented in the Jatiya Sangsad (National Parliament) of Bangladesh since 2026 by Hamidur Rahman of the Bangladesh Nationalist Party.

== Boundaries ==
The constituency encompasses Dhaka South City Corporation wards 23 through 33, 35, and 36.

== History ==
The constituency was created for the first general elections in newly independent Bangladesh, held in 1973.

Ahead of the 2008 general election, the Bangladesh Election Commission redrew constituency boundaries to reflect population changes revealed by the 2001 Bangladesh census. The 2008 redistricting altered the boundaries of the constituency.

== Members of Parliament ==
| Election | Member | Party |
|---|---|---|
| 1973 | Abdul Karim Bepari | Awami League |
| 1979 | Siddiquir Rahman | Bangladesh Nationalist Party |
| 1986 | Jahangir Mohammad Adel | Jatiya Party |
| 1991 | Sadeque Hossain Khoka | Bangladesh Nationalist Party |
| Feb 1996 | Sadeque Hossain Khoka | Bangladesh Nationalist Party |
| Jun 1996 | Sadeque Hossain Khoka | Bangladesh Nationalist Party |
| 2001 | Sadeque Hossain Khoka | Bangladesh Nationalist Party |
| 2008 | Mostofa Jalal Mohiuddin | Awami League |
| 2014 | Haji Mohammad Salim | Independent |
| 2018 | Haji Mohammad Salim | Awami League |
| 2024 | Mohammad Solaiman Salim | Awami League |
| 2026 | Hamidur Rahman | Bangladesh Nationalist Party |

== Elections ==
=== Elections in the 2020s ===
General Election 2026: Dhaka-7
| Party | Candidate | Votes | % | ±% |
|---|---|---|---|---|
| BNP | Hamidur Rahman | 104,666 | 46.3 | N/A |
| Jamaat | Hafez Enayet Ullah | 98,483 | 43.5 | N/A |
| Independent | Mohammad Ishak Sarkar | 11,517 | 5.1 | N/A |
| IAB | Md. Abdur Rahman | 5,081 | 2.2 | N/A |
| BKA | Mufti Habibullah Miyaji | 2,783 | 1.2 | N/A |
| JP(E) | Mohammad Saifuddin Ahomed Milon | 2,294 | 1.0 | N/A |
| BSD (Marxist) | Shima Datta | 677 | 0.3 | N/A |
| Bangladesh Republican Party | Shafiqur Rahman | 218 | 0.1 | N/A |
| JSD (Rab) | Sahana Selim | 208 | 0.1 | N/A |
| BSM | Maksudur Rahman | 150 | 0.1 | N/A |
| BJP | Md. Sohidul Islam | 98 | 0.0 | N/A |
| Majority | | 6,183 | 2.7 | N/A |
| Turnout | | 226,077 | 47.2 | N/A |
| Registered electors | | 479,376 | | |
| BNP gain from AL | | | | |

=== Elections in the 2010s ===
General Election 2014: Dhaka-7
| Party | Candidate | Votes | % | ±% |
|---|---|---|---|---|
| Independent | Haji Mohammad Salim | 42,728 | 58.1 | N/A |
| AL | Mostafa Jalal Mohiuddin | 30,733 | 41.8 | −23.6 |
| Independent | Muhammad Riaz Uddin | 3,120 | 4.1% | N/A |
| Majority | | 11,995 | 16.3 | −17.5 |
| Turnout | | 76,581 | 24.4 | −56.7 |
| Independent gain from AL | | | | |

=== Elections in the 2000s ===
General Election 2008: Dhaka-7
| Party | Candidate | Votes | % | ±% |
|---|---|---|---|---|
| AL | Mostofa Jalal Mohiuddin | 146,347 | 65.4 | +22.2 |
| BNP | Md. Nasir Uddin Ahmed Pinto | 70,747 | 31.6 | −22.8 |
| IAB | Md. Nurol Amin | 2,197 | 1.0 | N/A |
| Ganatantri Party | Sarafat Ali Hira | 1,268 | 0.6 | N/A |
| Gano Forum | Sahida Amir | 950 | 0.4 | N/A |
| BKA | Md. Jaforullah Khan | 672 | 0.3 | −0.3 |
| Independent | Md. Eiah Hiah Ahmed | 478 | 0.2 | N/A |
| BDB | Azmire Begam | 427 | 0.2 | N/A |
| KSJL | Md. Rahim | 247 | 0.1 | N/A |
| NAP | Md. Mostofa Kamal | 208 | 0.1 | N/A |
| Jatiya Party (M) | Saroar Hosain | 102 | 0.0 | N/A |
| Bangladesh Kalyan Party | M. Ibrahim Adil Khan | 50 | 0.0 | N/A |
| BJP | Md. Munirol Islam Skedar | 42 | 0.0 | N/A |
| Majority | | 75,600 | 33.8 | +22.6 |
| Turnout | | 223,735 | 81.1 | +13.8 |
| AL gain from BNP | | | | |

General Election 2001: Dhaka-7
| Party | Candidate | Votes | % | ±% |
|---|---|---|---|---|
| BNP | Sadeque Hossain Khoka | 123,686 | 54.4 | +9.4 |
| AL | Sayeed Khokon | 98,229 | 43.2 | −0.6 |
| IJOF | Jahangir Mohammad Adel | 3,093 | 1.4 | N/A |
| BKA | Abdul Malek Chowdhury | 1,378 | 0.6 | +0.5 |
| JSD | Md. Anowar Hossain | 229 | 0.1 | +0.1 |
| Bangladesh Progressive Party | Muhammad Mahsin Kabir | 120 | 0.1 | N/A |
| Independent | Md. Shamim Ahmed | 75 | 0.0 | N/A |
| Independent | Md. Salah Uddin Ahmed | 72 | 0.0 | N/A |
| Bangladesh People's Congress | Md. Nurul Islam | 60 | 0.0 | N/A |
| Independent | Md. Aslam | 59 | 0.0 | N/A |
| Independent | Abu Syed | 46 | 0.0 | N/A |
| Bangladesh Muslim League (Jamir Ali) | Md. Kudrat Ullah | 45 | 0.0 | N/A |
| Independent | Md. Jahangir Alam | 40 | 0.0 | N/A |
| BKSMA (Sadeq) | Krishak Md. Sadeq | 32 | 0.0 | N/A |
| BAKSAL | M. A. Shahid | 22 | 0.0 | N/A |
| Independent | Nasimul Gani Khan | 21 | 0.0 | N/A |
| Majority | | 25,457 | 11.2 | +10.0 |
| Turnout | | 227,207 | 67.3 | −5.3 |
| BNP hold | | | | |

=== Elections in the 1990s ===
General Election June 1996: Dhaka-7
| Party | Candidate | Votes | % | ±% |
|---|---|---|---|---|
| BNP | Sadek Hossain | 87,255 | 45.0 | −11.7 |
| AL | Fajlul Karim | 84,940 | 43.8 | +7.3 |
| JP(E) | Jahangir Mohammad Adel | 13,287 | 6.9 | +5.4 |
| Jamaat | A. K. M. Abdus Salam | 3,494 | 1.8 | +0.1 |
| Zaker Party | Hammadul Akbar | 1,648 | 0.9 | −0.7 |
| IOJ | Lutfar Rahman | 1,319 | 0.7 | N/A |
| Independent | Samsuzzaman Mintu | 369 | 0.2 | N/A |
| Gano Forum | Sahida Amir | 367 | 0.2 | N/A |
| BKA | Abdul Malek Chowdhury | 170 | 0.1 | N/A |
| Independent | Nasir Uddin Pannu | 159 | 0.1 | N/A |
| Bangladesh Vhashani Adarsha Bastabayana Parishad | Syed Minar Hossain Minu | 107 | 0.1 | N/A |
| Bangladesh Samajtantrik Dal (Khalekuzzaman) | Rowshan Ara Begum | 87 | 0.0 | N/A |
| Bangladesh Tanjimul Muslimin | Nur Hossain Chowdury | 81 | 0.0 | N/A |
| FP | Md. Ansar Sikdar | 77 | 0.0 | −0.3 |
| Independent | Nasir Ali | 76 | 0.0 | N/A |
| Bangladesh Jatiya League (Sobhan) | Abdus Sobhan | 61 | 0.0 | N/A |
| JSD | Habibur Rahman Showkat | 45 | 0.0 | N/A |
| Jatiya Janata Party (Nurul Islam) | Md. Majibur Rahman | 42 | 0.0 | N/A |
| Ganatantrik Sarbahara Party | Qazi Farid Ahmed | 38 | 0.0 | N/A |
| Jatiya Samajtantrik Dal-JSD | Md. Hafizur Rahman | 37 | 0.0 | −0.1 |
| Social Democratic Party | Md. Nurul Islam | 36 | 0.0 | N/A |
| Bangladesh Janata Party | Md. Humayun Kabir | 32 | 0.0 | −0.6 |
| Jatiya Janata Party (Asad) | Nurjahan Taleb Munshi | 18 | 0.0 | N/A |
| NDP | Md. Abul Kashem | 15 | 0.0 | −0.1 |
| Majority | | 2,315 | 1.2 | −18.9 |
| Turnout | | 193,760 | 72.6 | +14.5 |
| BNP hold | | | | |

General Election 1991: Dhaka-7
| Party | Candidate | Votes | % | ±% |
|---|---|---|---|---|
| BNP | Sadeque Hossain Khoka | 76,601 | 56.7 | |
| AL | Sheikh Hasina | 49,362 | 36.5 | |
| Jamaat | A. K. M. Abdus Salam | 2,262 | 1.7 | |
| Zaker Party | Sageer Ahmed | 2,168 | 1.6 | |
| JP(E) | Shafiqur Rahman | 1,992 | 1.5 | |
| Bangladesh Janata Party | Begum Razia Alim | 757 | 0.6 | |
| FP | Liyakat Hossain | 454 | 0.3 | |
| Ganatantri Party | Mahmudur Rahman Babu | 269 | 0.2 | |
| Jatiya Samajtantrik Dal-JSD | Nazirul Islam | 187 | 0.1 | |
| Independent | Jahangir Khan | 184 | 0.1 | |
| Independent | Abdur Rahman | 159 | 0.1 | |
| UCL | Naseem Ali | 150 | 0.1 | |
| Independent | Khalilur Rahman | 128 | 0.1 | |
| NDP | Alamagir Hossain | 96 | 0.1 | |
| Independent | Ahmed Aorangajeb Kabir | 88 | 0.1 | |
| Jatiya Janata Party and Gonotantrik Oikkya Jot | Md. Mujibur Rahman Hiru | 73 | 0.1 | |
| JSD (S) | Md. Gofran Miyan | 64 | 0.0 | |
| Independent | Millat Hossain | 56 | 0.0 | |
| Independent | Md. Ibrahim Hossain | 48 | 0.0 | |
| Bangladesh Muslim League (Yusuf) | Md. Foyez Box Kadri | 36 | 0.0 | |
| Bangladesh People's League (Garib A Nawaz) | Nasir Uddin Pannu | 28 | 0.0 | |
| Independent | Abdul Malek Chowdhury | 17 | 0.0 | |
| Jatiyatabadi Gonotantrik Chashi Dal | M. A. Ahsan Atik | 15 | 0.0 | |
| Majority | | 27,239 | 20.1 | |
| Turnout | | 135,194 | 58.1 | |
| BNP gain from JP(E) | | | | |
