= Mohammad Solaiman Salim =

Bangladeshi politician

- মোহাম্মদ সোলাইমান সেলিম

Member of Parliament
- In office 30 January 2024 – 6 August 2024
- Preceded by: Haji Mohammad Salim
- Constituency: Dhaka-7

Personal details
- Born: 31 March 1989 (age 37) Dhaka, Bangladesh
- Party: Bangladesh Awami League
- Parent: Haji Mohammad Salim (father)

Mohammad Solaiman Salim (born 31 March 1989) is a Bangladesh Awami League politician and a former Jatiya Sangsad member representing the Dhaka-7 constituency. He is a son of the former member Haji Mohammad Salim from the same constituency.

In November 2024, Salim was arrested from Gulshan after the fall of the Sheikh Hasina led Awami League government.
