= Mohammad Harun ar Rashid =

Bangladeshi politician

Member of Bangladesh Parliament
- In office 1986–1988
- Preceded by: Md. Abdul Hai
- Succeeded by: Anwar Hossain

Personal details
- Party: Jatiya Party (Ershad)

Mohammad Harun ar Rashid is a Jatiya Party (Ershad) politician and a former member of parliament for Dhaka-8.

== Career ==
Rashid was elected to parliament from Dhaka-8 as a Jatiya Party candidate in 1986.
