= Abdul Karim Bepari =

Bangladeshi politician

Member of Bangladesh Parliament

Personal details
- Died: 21 September 2011 (aged 90) Bangla Bazar, Old Dhaka, Bangladesh
- Political party: Bangladesh Awami League

Abdul Karim Bepari was a Bangladesh Awami League politician and a member of parliament for Dhaka-7.

== Biography ==
Bepari was elected to the Provincial Assembly of East Pakistan in 1962. In 1970, he was elected to the National Assembly of Pakistan from constituency Dhaka-XVI.

He was an organizer of the Bangladesh Liberation war.

He was elected to parliament from Dhaka-7 as a Bangladesh Awami League candidate in 1973. He was a close ally of Sheikh Mujibur Rahman.

== Death ==
Bepari died on 21 September 2011, aged 90.
