= Jahangir Mohammad Adel =

Bangladeshi politician

- জাহাংগীর মোহাম্মদ আদেল

Member of Parliament for Dhaka-12
- In office 18 February 1979 – 24 March 1982
- Preceded by: Sheikh Mujibur Rahman
- Succeeded by: Shamsuddoha Khan Majlish

Personal details
- Died: 13 November 2014
- Party: Bangladesh Jatiya Party

Jahangir Mohammad Adel (Bengali: জাহাংগীর মোহাম্মদ আদেল, romanized: Jāhāṅgīra Mōhām'mada Ādēla; died 13 November 2014) was a Bangladesh Nationalist Party and Jatiya Party politician. He was the member of parliament (MP) for Dhaka-12 from 1979 to 1982 and MP for Dhaka-7 from 1986 to 1988. He served as Dhaka's deputy mayor.

== Career ==
He served as Dhaka's deputy mayor. Kamal Hossain, a leader of the Bangladesh Awami League, was shot and killed on 14 August 2000, outside Adel's home after objecting to the flying of Pakistan's flag on Pakistan Day inside Adel's home in Old Dhaka. His sons were acquitted in 2003 in the case. He was a former presidium member of Jatiya Party.

== Death ==
Jahangir Mohammad Adel died on 13 November 2014.
