= Mir Shawkat Ali =

Bangladeshi revolutionary, politician, freedom fighter and military officer

Mir Shawkat Ali BU

Member of Parliament for Dhaka-8
- In office 5 March 1991 – 24 November 1995
- Prime Minister: Khaleda Zia
- Preceded by: Anwar Hossain
- Succeeded by: Haji Mohammad Salim

Bangladesh High Commissioner to the United Kingdom
- In office 27 July 1986 – 30 July 1987
- President: Hussain Muhammad Ershad
- Preceded by: Fakhruddin Ahmed
- Succeeded by: K M Shafiullah

Ambassador of Bangladesh to Egypt
- In office 5 September 1981 – 5 August 1982
- Preceded by: Arshad-uz Zaman
- Succeeded by: M. Hedayat Ahmed

President of Bangladesh Football Federation
- In office 19 June 1976 – 27 December 1978
- Preceded by: Gazi Golam Mostafa
- Succeeded by: Siddique Ahmed

Personal details
- Born: 11 January 1938 Dacca, Bengal Province, British India
- Died: 20 November 2010 (aged 72) Dhaka, Bangladesh
- Resting place: Banani graveyard
- Awards: Bir Uttom

Military service
- Allegiance: Bangladesh; Pakistan (before 1971)
- Branch: Bangladesh Army; Mukti Bahini; Pakistan Army
- Service years: 1958–1981
- Rank: Lieutenant General
- Unit: East Bengal Regiment
- Commands: Principal Staff Officer at Supreme Command Headquarters; Chief of General Staff; GOC of 9th Infantry Division; GOC of 55th Infantry Division; Commander of 65th Independent Infantry Brigade; Commander of Sector V
- Conflicts: Bangladesh Liberation War; Indo-Pakistani war of 1965; 1976 Bogra mutiny

Mir Shawkat Ali (Note: BU, ndc, psc) (11 January 1938 – 20 November 2010) was a Bangladeshi three-star general and Bangladesh Nationalist Party politician. Shawkat fought during the Bangladesh Liberation War as one of the sector commanders of the Mukti Bahini, for which he was awarded the Bir Uttom, the second-highest gallantry award of Bangladesh. Shawkat later served as the minister of food and the minister of labour and employment during the First Khaleda ministry.

== Early life ==
He was born in Nazirabazar, Dacca, of then Bengal Province, British India (now in Dhaka Division, Bangladesh) on 11 January 1938. He studied at Mahuttuli Free Primary School in Dhaka. He graduated from Armanitola Government High School in 1953 and Dhaka College in 1955. After graduation, he joined the Pakistan Military Academy. In 1958, he received his commission in Pakistan Army.

== Military career ==
=== Pakistan ===
In 1956, Shawkat enlisted at the Pakistan Military Academy in Kakol and was commissioned in the 2nd East Bengal Regiment with the 17th PMA Long Course on 27 April 1958. But he served in a number of units, including the military intelligence department. His first experience of battle came from the 1965 Indo-Pak War in Rangpur border. He joined the Eighth East Bengal Regiment in 1971 at Sholasahar, Chittagong.

==== Bangladesh Liberation War ====
After Operation Searchlight on 25 March 1971, he revolted with his unit, the Eighth East Bengal Regiment. He joined the Bangladesh Liberation War. On 30 March 1971, he was given command of the Entire Regiment.

He commanded the Battle of Kalurghat in April 1971. After Kalurghat fell, he retreated to Bandarban with his unit. He crossed the border into India. After the formation of the Mujibnagar government, he was appointed Sector-5 commander. He commanded 12 thousand men in his sector. In August 1971, he was promoted to lieutenant colonel. After the war, he was awarded Bir Uttom, the second-highest award in Bangladesh.

=== Bangladesh ===
In 1972, Shawkat was promoted to colonel and inaugurated the 65th Independent Infantry Brigade at Kaptai. He was soon promoted to brigadier general in January 1974 and was appointed as commandant of the School of Infantry and Tactics. During the 3 November 1975 Bangladeshi coup d'état, Shawkat remained loyal to the military administration and was designated as the chief of general staff, succeeding Brigadier General Khaled Mosharraf, who took over as chief martial law administrator of the country. On 18 November 1975, Shawkat was upgraded to major general and formed the 9th Infantry Division in Sher-e-Bangla Nagar, which he served simultaneously along with his administrative duties. He was also chairman of Old Dhaka Development Committee and Chief Martial Law Administrator of Dhaka. In April 1974, when President Anwar Sadat of Egypt gifted 30 T-54 tanks to Bangladesh, he led a military delegation to collect them. In 1976, Shawkat was furthermore designated as president of the Bangladesh Football Federation, which he served till 1978.

During the 1976 Bogra Mutiny, he pinned down the 9th Infantry Division with the 46th Independent Infantry Brigade. After the 1977 Bangladesh Air Force mutiny, he was posted to the 55th Infantry Division, while his colleague and rival Major General Muhammed Abul Manzur, succeeded him as the chief of general staff. However, after the assassination of President Ziaur Rahman, Manzur contacted him and gave him orders from a "revolutionary council". Ali refused to follow them and remained loyal to the civilian government. President Abdus Sattar appointed Shawkat as principal staff officer of supreme command headquarters, which he served till July 1981. Shawkat was promoted to brevet lieutenant general and went on leave per retirement the same year.

== Political career ==
After retirement, he served as the ambassador to Egypt, Austria, the United Kingdom, Sudan, Germany, and Portugal. He resigned his diplomatic post in protest against the dictatorship of Hussain Muhammad Ershad.

He joined the Bangladesh Nationalist Party shortly afterwards. In 1991, he was elected to parliament from Dhaka-8. He was the state minister for food, and cabinet minister of labour and manpower. He was the vice president of the Sector Commanders Forum.

== War criminals trial ==
As a freedom fighter, he took issue with BNP's alliance with Jamaat-e-Islami since their top leaders were accused of war crimes. He left BNP because of disagreements with chairperson Khaleda Zia regarding Jamaat-e-Islami inclusion in the Four Party Alliance. In a statement, he said:

It hurts my conscience when I have to sit with Razakaar and al-Badrs at the same table. It reminds me of the days in 1971 when boys fought under my command and laid down their lives.

He was one of the pioneers of the war crimes trial movement. He campaigned countrywide to raise support for the trial.

== Death ==
On 20 November 2010, he died in Dhaka, Bangladesh. He was buried with full military honors in the Banani Military graveyard.
