= 1962 East Pakistan Education movement =

1962 student protest against the recommended education system of East Pakistan

The 1962 East Pakistan (now Bangladesh) education movement was a movement by students against the education policy recommended by the Sharif Commission, official name Commission on National Education, to the president of Pakistan, Ayub Khan. The policy would have made English and Urdu mandatory subjects. It would have privatized education and revoked the right to free primary education as unrealistically "utopian".

The movement started on 17 September, which is commemorated as education day in Bangladesh.

== Background ==
=== Sharif Commission ===
President of Pakistan Ayub Khan declared the formation of a commission to establish an education policy on 30 December 1958, and it was formed on 5 January 1959. The chairman of this commission was the secretary of the education department of West Pakistan named S. M. Sharif, who was also a teacher of Ayub Khan at the Aligarh Muslim University. The total number of members of that commission was eleven, with only four members from East Pakistan. This commission was called the Commission on National Education and popularly known as the "Sharif Commission".

=== Recommendations of the report ===
On 26 August 1959, the commission submitted their report, which was published as a book in 1962.

- They declared education as a product. This report says, "We have to change the traditional thinking of the peoples about education. They think that education is a cheap thing which should be changed. We have to remember the truth that high quality products have high price."
- They divided the total education system into three parts, such as primary level, secondary level, and higher level. The duration of primary and higher-level courses was 5 years, and higher degree course has duration of 3 years. The duration of post graduation course was 2 years. The marks required to pass exam was 50, second-class mark was 60 and first-class mark was 70. They had recommendations to ban student politics, to observe the activities of teachers and the duration of the work of teachers should be 15 hours. They wanted to apply Roman alphabets in place of Bangla alphabets.
- It recommended making Urdu the national language, along with both Urdu and Bangla being mediums of instruction from Class VI, with the goal of eventually making Urdu the medium of instruction at the university level, though English would continue to be used in the interim.
- English should be compulsory from grade six.

== Movement ==
The students of East Pakistan opposed this report, and agitation was started by Dhaka College students. In 1962, they decided to observe Language Movement Day on 21 February and the birthday of Rabindranath Tagore as a way to oppose that report. The West Pakistani Government arrested Huseyn Shaheed Suhrawardy on 30 January 1962. Organizations like the Bangladesh Students' Union, Bangladesh Chatra League, Nation Students Federations, and Chatra Shakti were working on the movement together. They observed hartal on 1 February 1962 and continued their movement by performing meetings. On 7 February of that month the government placed a field cannon to intimidate the movement in Dhaka. On 17 September 1962, students declared a hartal. On that day demonstrations took place in Dhaka. They burned a vehicle of a government minister, Khwaja Hassan Askari, and burned three police vehicles. Police used tear gas and live bullets. The second part of the demonstrations took place in front of the East Pakistan High Court. Police killed three people named Babul, Golam Mustafa, and Waziullah. They also arrested many students. They had killed a labourer named Sundor Ali in Tongi.

== Result ==
Opposition leader of East Pakistan, Huseyn Shaheed Suhrawardy, met with the governor, Ghulam Faruque Khan, which led to the government pausing the recommendation of the Sharif Commission. Bangladesh observes 17 September as their education day.
