= Mostofa Jalal Mohiuddin =

Bangladeshi politician

Member of Parliament (Bangladesh)
- In office 29 December 2008 – 5 January 2014
- Preceded by: Sadeque Hossain Khoka
- Succeeded by: Haji Mohammad Salim
- Constituency: Dhaka-7

Presidium Member of Bangladesh Awami League
- Incumbent
- Assumed office 9 December 2022
- President: Sheikh Hasina

President of Bangladesh Chhatra League
- In office 1983–1985
- Leader: Sheikh Hasina
- Preceded by: Obaidul Quader
- Succeeded by: Abdul Mannan (politician, born 1953)

Personal details
- Born: 15 March 1951 (age 75) Dhaka
- Party: Bangladesh Awami League
- Occupation: Doctor

Mostofa Jalal Mohiuddin (born 15 March 1951) is a Bangladesh Awami League politician and a former member of parliament for the Dhaka-7 constituency. He has been a presidium member of the Bangladesh Awami League since December 2022. He is the incumbent president of the Bangladesh Medical Association (BMA).

== Career ==
Mohiuddin was president of the Bangladesh Chhatra League, the student wing of the Bangladesh Awami League, from 1981 to 1983.

Mohiuddin was elected to parliament from Dhaka-7 as a Bangladesh Awami League candidate in 2008. In September 2014, his supporters attacked the supporters of his successor Haji Mohammad Salim.

After the fall of the Sheikh Hasina led Awami League government, Mohiuddin was detained in January 2025 from Monsurabad Housing Society in Mohammadpur.
