= Fazlul Huq Muslim Hall =

- ফজলুল হক মুসলিম হল
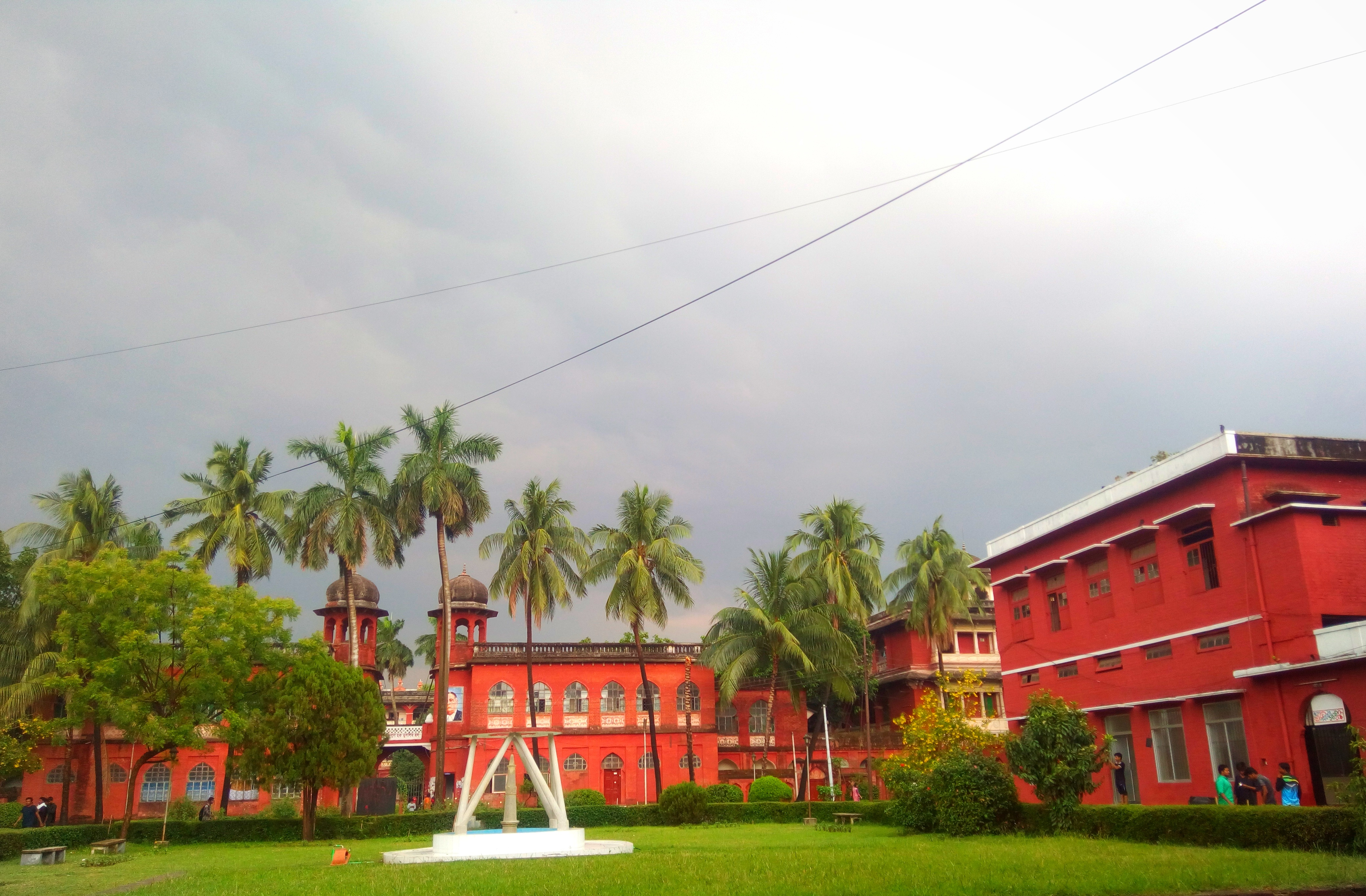
- Interactive map of the Fazlul Huq Muslim Hall area
- Alternative names: FH Hall
- Etymology: A. K. Fazlul Huq, First Prime Minister of Bengal

General information
- Status: In use
- Type: Quadrangle
- Location: University of Dhaka, University Street, Dhaka 1000, Dhaka, Bangladesh
- Coordinates: 23.7259°N 90.4034°E
- Opened: 1 July 1940
- Affiliation: University of Dhaka

Website
- www.du.ac.bd/home/hall_admin/hfh

Fazlul Huq Muslim Hall is one of the oldest residential halls of Dhaka University.

== History ==
=== Establishment ===
Fazlul Huq Muslim Hall was established in 1940 and named after A. K. Fazlul Huq, former prime minister of undivided Bengal. Fazlul Huq played a major part in establishing Dhaka University. The hall commenced its activity on 1 July 1940 with 363 students including include 231 residential students, 132 non-residential students and 3 female students. On 16 June 1972, the syndicate of Dhaka University removed the word "Muslim" from its name. The decision was challenged in court by Advocate Shamsul Alam. On 1 March 2004, Bangladesh High Court ordered the university authorities to restore the original name. Linguist Muhammad Shahidullah was the first provost of the hall.

=== Establishment of East Pakistan Muslim Students' League ===
Sheikh Mujibur Rahman was politically active on Fazlul Haq Muslim Hall, even though he was not an residential student of the hall. On 4 January 1948, East Pakistan Muslim Students' League was established in a meeting organized at Fazlul Haq Muslim Hall Auditorium and after establishment of the political group, Sheikh Mujibur Rahman came out as an influential leader.

=== Language Movement ===
On 15 January 1948, the National Language Sub-Committee Office of the National Language Action Committee was relocated to Fazlul Haq Muslim Hall at the proposal made by Muhammad Twaha, the then DUCSU vice president of the hall committee. On 2 March 1948, The second National Language Action Committee (সর্বদলীয় রাষ্ট্রভাষা সংগ্রাম পরিষদ), which was a coalition of Tamaddun Majlish and East Pakistan Muslim Students' League, was also formed at a meeting presided by Sheikh Mujibur Rahman in this hall to strengthen language movement.

== Facilities ==
The hall consists which was afo residential buildings:

- The three-storey main building
- The five-storey south building

The hall has a capacity of a total of 244 rooms with 766 seats. Although, there are almost twice as many residential students who currently reside there exceeding the hall's total capacity. The hall has a library with books on different subjects. The library is open for non-resident as well as resident students every working day. New books are purchased in every academic year from the university fund.

Annual sports are organized every year.

Fazlul Haq Muslim Hall Debating Club hosts the National Science Debating Festival annually.

== Gallery ==
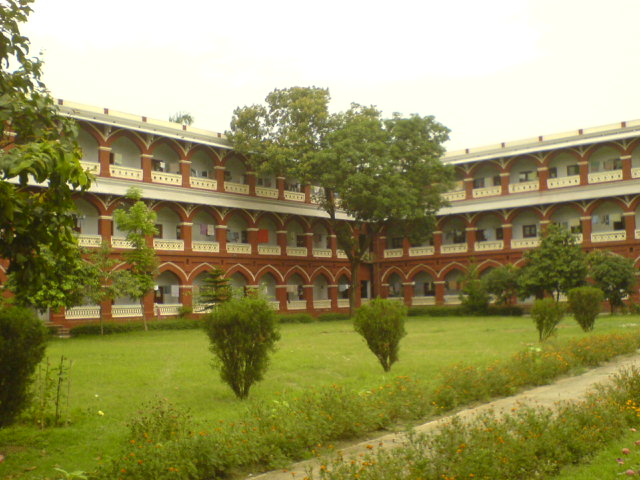
Hall main building

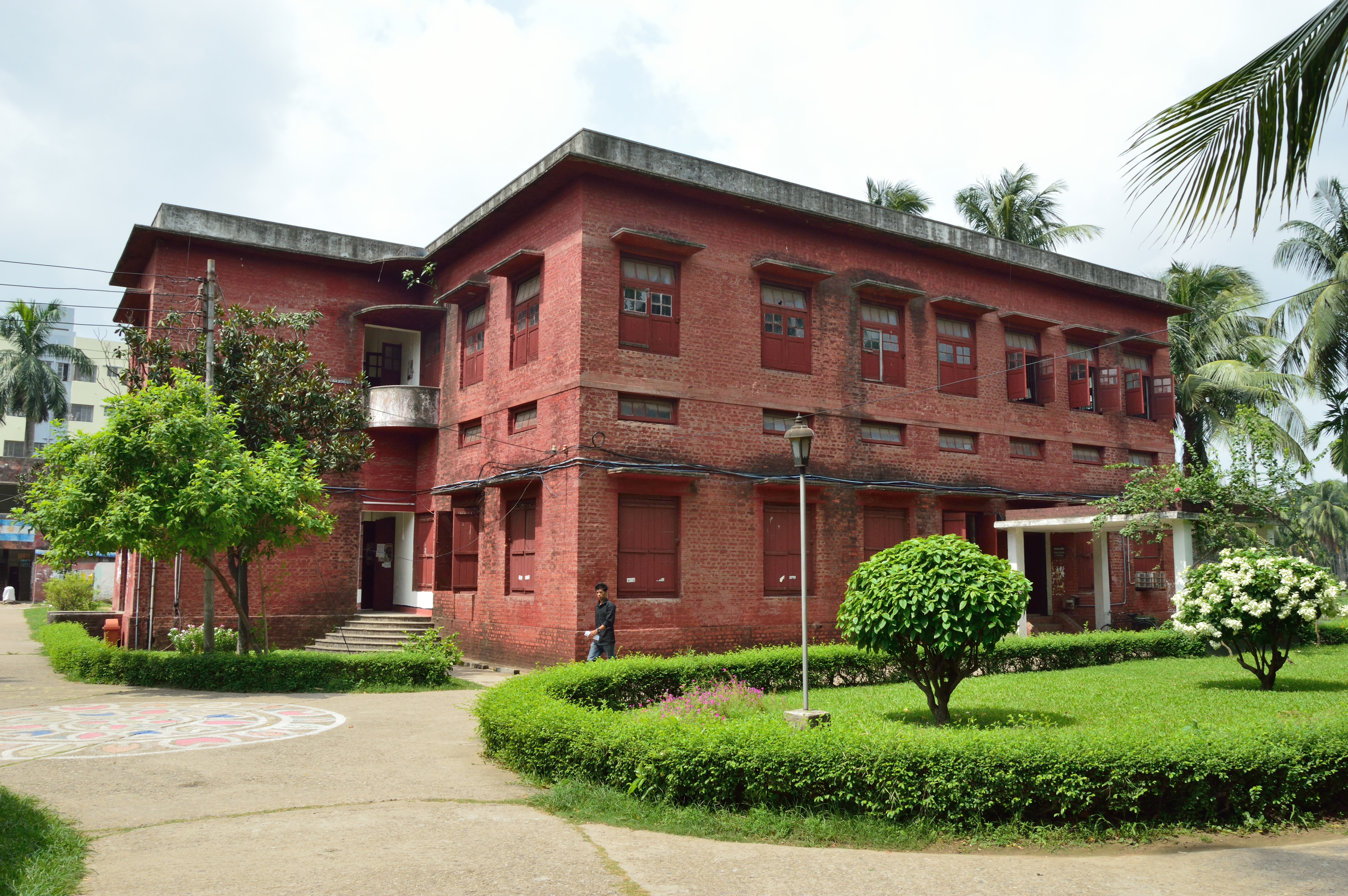
Office of Provost - Fazlul Huq Muslim Hall - University of Dhaka

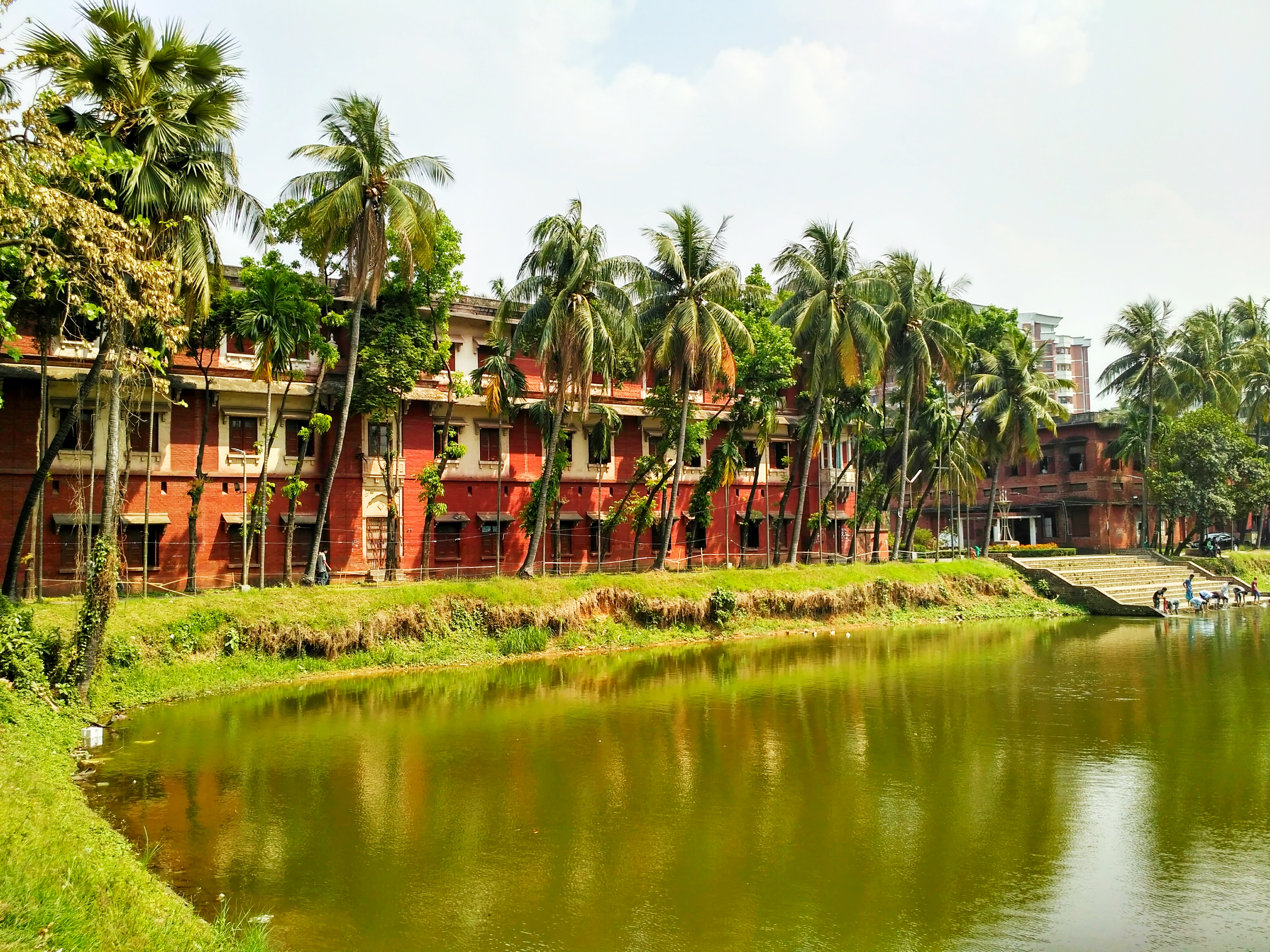
View from Department of Zoology, University of Dhaka

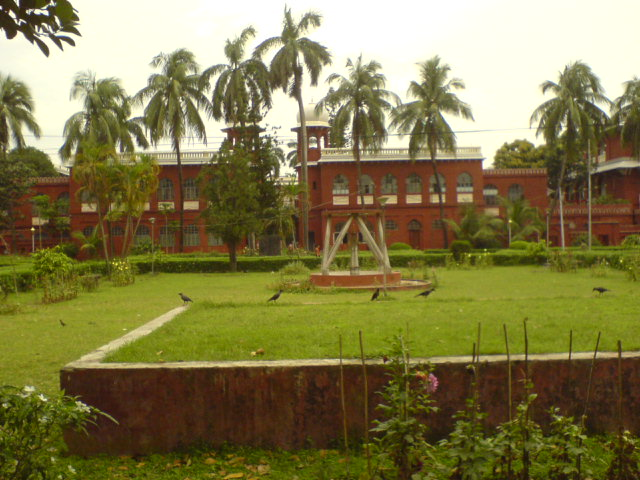
Hall Muktamancha, a place of cultural activity.

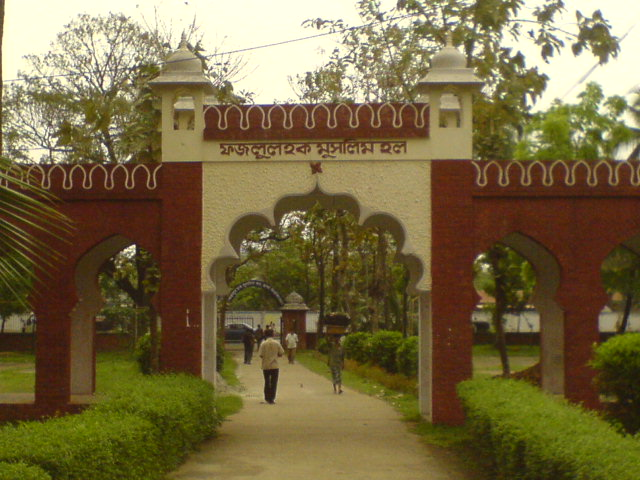
Entrance of hall

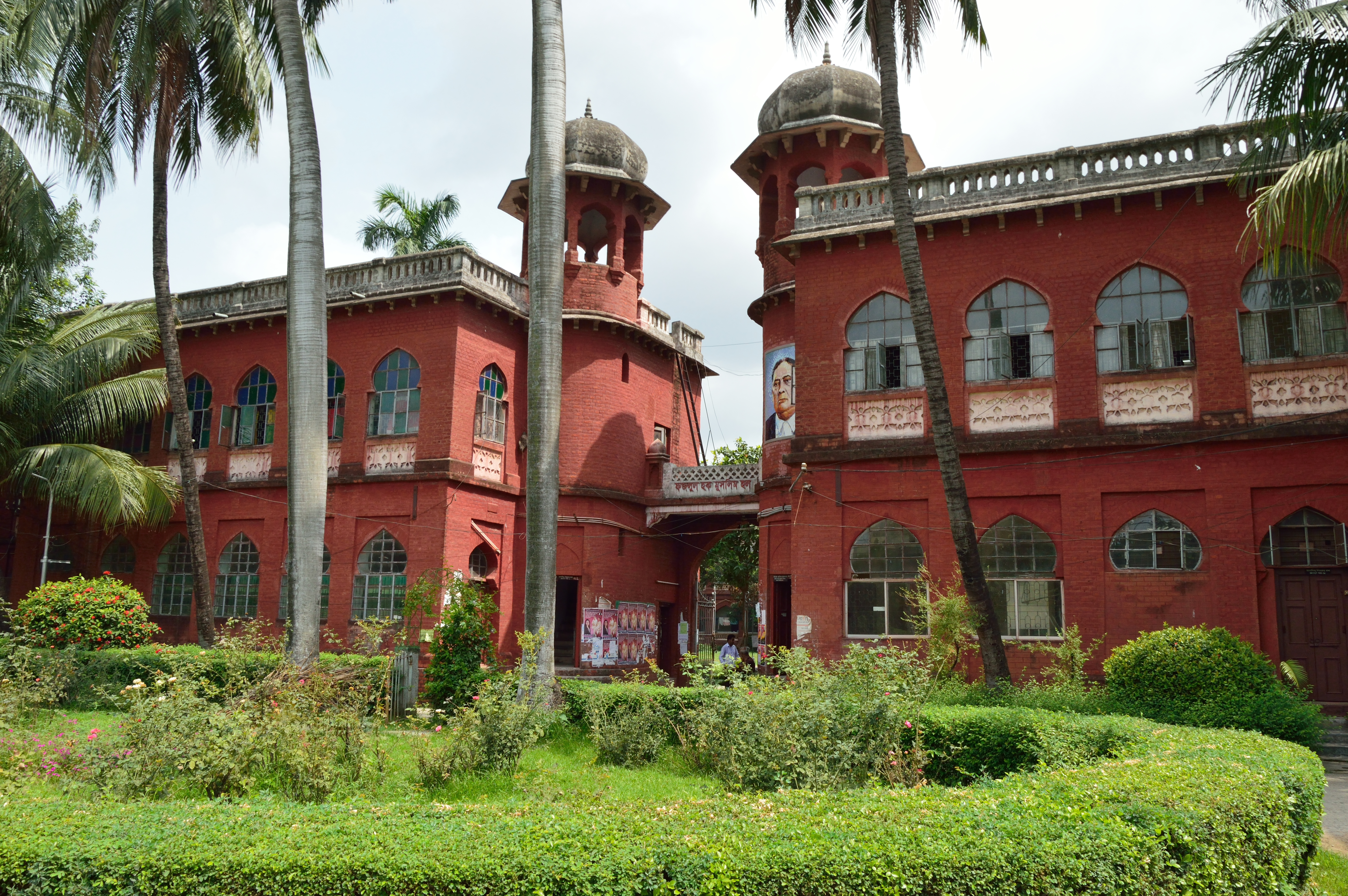
Fazlul Huq Muslim Hall main building gate.
