= 'Abd al-Wahid =

ʽAbd al-Wāḥid (Arabic: عبد الواحد) is a masculine given name and surname of Arabic origin. It is built from the Arabic words ʽabd, meaning subordinate, and al-Wāḥid, one of the names of God in the Qur'an, which gives rise to a Muslim theophoric name. It means "servant of the One". Notable people with the name include:

== Given name ==
=== Abd el-Ouahed ===
- Abd el-Ouahed ben Messaoud, Moroccan diplomat

=== Abd al-Wahid ===
- Abd al-Wahid I (died 1224), Almohad caliph
- Abd al-Wahid II (died 1242), Almohad caliph
- Abd al-Wahid Zakariya ibn al-Lihyani (1253–1326), Hafsid caliph of Ifriqiya
- Abd al-Wahid al-Marrakushi (1185–1262), Moroccan historian
- Abd al-Wahid ibn Abdallah al-Nasri, Umayyad governor
- Abd al-Wahid ibn Sulayman (died 750), Umayyad prince and governor
- Abd al-Wahid ibn Zaid (died 794), Iraqi Sufi saint

=== Abdel Wahed ===
- Abdel Wahed Ben Siamar Mimun (born 1941), Moroccan basketball player
- Abdel-Wahed El-Sayed (born 1977), Egyptian footballer
- Abdel-Wahed El-Wakil (born 1943), Egyptian architect

=== Abdel Wahid ===
- Abdel Wahid bin Yazid el-Iskandarani (died 851), Egyptian vizier, poet, writer, and military commander
- Abdel-Wahid Youssef, Sudanese engineer and politician

=== Abdul Wahed ===
- Abdul Wahed (politician), Bangladeshi politician
- Abdul Wahed Bokainagari (1976–1968), Bengali politician
- Abdul Wahed Sarābi (1926–??), Afghan politician

=== Abdul Waheed ===
- Abdul Waheed (field hockey) (1936–2022), Pakistani hockey player
- Abdul Waheed (politician), Indian politician
- Abdul Waheed Chowdhury (1914–1965), Bangladeshi Army officer
- Abdul Waheed Kakar (1937–2026), Pakistani Army officer
- Abdul Waheed Khan (UNESCO official) (born 1947), Indian UN official
- Abdul Waheed Majeed (1972–2014), British-Pakistani suicide bomber

=== Abdul Wahid ===
- Abdul Wahid (footballer) (born 1965), Pakistani footballer
- Abdul Wahid (governor) (born 1980), Indonesian politician
- Abdul Wahid (politician) (1960–2024), Indonesian politician
- Abdul-Wahid I, Almohad Caliph (died 1224), Moroccan caliph
- Abdul Wahid Adamjee (1908–1972), Pakistani industrialist
- Abdul Wahid Aresar (1949–2015), Pakistani writer
- Abdul-Wahid Aziz (1931–1982), Iraqi weightlifter
- Abdul Wahid Bengali (1850–1905), Bangladeshi Islamic scholar, teacher, and social reformer
- Abdul Wahid Durrani (1917–2008), Pakistani footballer
- Abdul Wahid Hussain (born 1966), Maldivian footballer
- Abdul Wahid Khan (1871–1949), Indian classical singer
- Abdul Wahid Nazari (born 1953), Afghan film director
- Abdul Wahid al-Nur (born 1968), Sudanese rebel
- Abdul Wahid Omar (born 1964), Malaysian banker and investor
- Abdul Wahid Pedersen (born 1954), Danish imam
- Abdul-Wahid Shannan ar-Ribat (born 1944), Iraqi Army general
- Abdul Wahid Siddique (born 1965), Pakistani politician
- Abdul Wahid Soomro, Pakistani politician
- Abdul Wahid Sr., Pakistani footballer

=== Abdelouahed ===
- Abdelouahed Belkeziz (1939–2021), Moroccan lawyer, politician, and diplomat
- Abdelouahed Chakhsi (born 1986), Moroccan footballer
- Abdelouahed Idrissi Chorfi (born 1969), Moroccan judoka
- Abdelouahed Mountassir (born 1956), Moroccan architect and urban planner
- Abdelouahed Souhail (born 1946), Moroccan politician

=== Abdelwahed ===
- Abdelwahed Radi (1935–2023), Moroccan politician
- Abdelwahed Wahib (born 2000), Moroccan footballer

=== Abdelwahid ===
- Abdelwahid Bouabdallah (born 1953), Algerian businessman
- Abdelwahid Aboud Mackaye (born 1953), Chadian rebel

=== Abdolvahed ===
- Abdolvahed Mousavi Lari (born 1954), Iranian politician

=== Abdulvohid ===
- Abdulvohid Burhonov (1875–1934), Uzbek educator and poet

=== Abdulwahed ===
- Abdulwahed Al-Awadhi (born 1955), Kuwaiti politician
- Abdulwahed Mohamed Fara (born 1949), Yemeni diplomat

=== Abdulwaheed ===
- Abdulwaheed Afolabi (born 1991), Nigerian footballer
- Abdulwaheed Omar, Nigerian trade union leader

=== Abdulwahid ===
- Abdulwahid AlAbduljabbar (1935–1970), Saudi political activist
- Abdulwahid Bidin (1925–1999), Filipino jurist
- Abdulwahid Rigi (died 2022), Iranian Sunni Muslim cleric
- Abdulwahid Muhammed Salih (born 1973), Iraqi academic, researcher, author, Islamic speaker, and general surgeon

== Surname ==
=== Abdel Wahed ===
- Mohamed Abdel Wahed (born 1981), Egyptian footballer

=== Abdul Wahad ===
- Tariq Abdul-Wahad (born 1974), French basketball player

=== Abdul Wahed ===
- Hussein Abdul-Wahed (born 1986), Iraqi footballer
- Raes Abdul Wahed, Afghan Taliban commander

=== Abdulwahid ===
- Sarwa Abdulwahid (born 1970) Iraqi politician
