= Abdul Awal Mia =

Bangladeshi politician

- আব্দুল আউয়াল মিয়া

Member of Bangladesh Parliament

Member of Parliament for Kushtia-4
- In office 1991–1996
- Preceded by: Nur Alam Ziku
- Succeeded by: Shahidullah Khan

Personal details
- Died: 11 April 2014 (age 71) Moghbazar, Dhaka, Bangladesh
- Party: Bangladesh Awami League
- Other political affiliations: Jatiya Party (Ershad)

Abdul Awal Mia was a Bangladesh Awami League politician and member of parliament of Kushtia-4.

== Career ==
Mia was elected to parliament from Kushtia-4 as a Bangladesh Awami League candidate in 1991. The party denied him their nomination in 1996, choosing elder statesman Abul Hossain Tarun instead. Mia worked against Tarun, and the party blamed him for Tarun's narrow loss to Bangladesh Nationalist Party candidate Syed Mehedi Ahmed Rumi. Mia left the Awami League in January 2001. He joined the Jatiya Party (Ershad), and contested the seat again in 2008, but finished a distant third.

== Death ==
Mia died on 11 April 2014 in Moghbazar, Dhaka, Bangladesh from liver cancer.
