= Abdulwahed =

Abdulwahed is a surname. Notable people with the surname include:

- Abdulwahed Al-Awadhi (born 1955), Kuwaiti politician
- Ali bin Abdulwahed Al-Sijelmasi (c. 1594–1647), Moroccan jurist, writer, physician and linguist
- Abdulwahed Mohamed Fara, Yemeni diplomat
