= Shahidul Islam (academic) =

Bangladeshi politician

Member of Bangladesh Parliament
- In office 1996–2001
- Preceded by: Abdur Rouf Chowdhury
- Succeeded by: Shahidul Islam
- In office 2001–2006
- Preceded by: Shahidul Islam
- Succeeded by: Hasanul Haq Inu

Personal details
- Party: Bangladesh Nationalist Party

Shahidul Islam is a Bangladesh Nationalist Party politician and a two term member of parliament for Kushtia-2 from 1996 to 2006. He was known for filing cases and attacking journalists in Kushtia District.

== Career ==
In 1981/6, Islam was removed from Bheramara College as lecturer after an investigation by the Deputy Commissioner found his high school certificate to be forged. In the 1980s, he joined the Bangladesh Nationalist Party.

In 1991, he tried to get the Bangladesh Nationalist Party nomination for Kushtia-2 but failed. He got his wife, Selina Shahid, elected to parliament from a Bangladesh Nationalist Party women's reserved seat.

Islam was elected to parliament from Kushtia-2 as a candidate of the Bangladesh Nationalist Party in the February 1996 Bangladeshi general election which was boycotted by all other political parties. The previous Bangladesh Nationalist Party member of parliament, Abdur Rouf Choudhury, refused to participate in the election without any other party.

Islam was elected to parliament from Kushtia-2 as a candidate of the Bangladesh Nationalist Party in 1996. He received 64,389 votes while his nearest rival, Ahsan Habib Lincoln of Jatiya Party, received 40,106 votes. Sirajul Islam Siraj, chief of Gono Bahini, campaigned for him in the election and intimidated voters. After Siraj surrendered, Islam asked a Bangladesh Nationalist Party politician to take over the gang.

Islam was elected to parliament from Kushtia-2 as a Bangladesh Nationalist Party candidate in 2001. He received 100,544 votes while his nearest rival, Mahbubul Alam Hanif of the Awami League, received 87,734 votes. Purbo Banglar Communist Party (PBCP-ML) campaigned for him in the election. On 1 April 2001, a follower of his was arrested with a gun and a case was filed against him. On 15 July 2001, three Awami League activists were murdered and a case was filed by Ismat Kadir Gamma against Islam but Bangladesh Police dropped his name from the case.

In 2003, Islam's associate Khokon as well as other leaders of Bangladesh Nationalist Party and Bangladesh Jamaat-e-Islami threatened the local Ahmaddiya Muslim Community.

In February 2004, Islam challenged a tender of the Bangladesh Water Development Board awarded to Japanese company with the parliamentary sub-committee who found the tender process faulty.

On 21 July 2005, seven journalists in Kushtia District filed a general diary alleging Islam was threatening them.

Islam verbally abused Hassan Jahid, a journalist of Manab Zamin, over a report at a government event in presence of Minister of Environment Tariqul Islam in May 2006. Following that Kushtia Reporters' Unity called for a boycott of all his events. In May, he filled an extortion case against three journalists claiming they threatened him at his house for 50 thousand taka. The journalists are Al-Mamun Sagar, of ATN Bangla and Jugantor, Hasan Jahid, of Manab Zamin and RTV, and Munshi Tarikul Islam, of Samakal and Channel 1. They had recently run a new story on corruption by Shahidul Islam's followers. Another extortion case was filed by a close aide of Islam and fellow Bangladesh Nationalist Party politician, Azad Biswas, who claimed the journalist robbed him at gunpoint and threatened to shoot him. The journalists fled Kushtia District following the cases. Kushtia District journalists called for the cases to be withdrawn. On 16 May, Justices M. A. Rashid and Mizanur Rahman Bhuiyan granted bail to the journalists. On 30 May, Bangladesh Nationalist Party activist and supporters of Shahidul Islam and Syed Mehedi Ahmed Rumi attacked a rally of journalists protesting against Shahidul Islam at the Kushtia Public Library ground. President of Bangladesh Federal Union of Journalists Iqbal Sobhan Chowdhury and other senior journalists from the union and the Dhaka Union of Journalists were injured. There were protests against the attack across the country and it was condemned by the Commonwealth Journalists Association and Committee to Protect Journalists. Prime Minister Sheikh Hasina called for action against the attackers. The International Federation of Journalists called for the charges to be dropped against the journalists. Human Rights Watch expressed concern over no one being arrested for the attack on journalists.

On 1 June 2006, Kushtia newspaper Andoloner Bazar was vandalized by Bangladesh Nationalist Party followers following which Islam warned local press against printing the newspaper. The newspaper stopped publication following the incident. Khoksa Press Club in Kushtia District was attacked and vandalized by Bangladesh Nationalist Party activists. In June 2006, Islam claimed he would win the next election regardless of the negative news against him. He also blamed the police for the attack on journalists in Kushtia District. He blamed the local people for the vandalism of Andoloner Bazar, a local newspaper. A human chain was formed protesting against him at the Jatiya Press Club. On 24 June 2006, the Bangladesh High Court granted bail to journalists Islam had filed cases against. There was a bomb attack on his election rally which he blamed on MA Khaleq who was contending against him for the Bangladesh Nationalist Party nomination. Khaleq, owner of Pacific Group, denied the allegations against him. Khaleq bought numerous allegations against Islam.

On 13 July 2006, Islam attended a meeting with Minister of Home Affairs Lutfozzaman Babar, members of parliament Abdus Salam Pintu, Bachhu Mollah, Syed Mehedi Ahmed Rumi, Inspector General of Police Anwarul Iqbal, and Sangbadik Shramik Karmachari Oikya Parishad after which he apologised to journalists. Lutfozzaman Babar ordered the administration take steps for Andoloner Bazar to resume publication and protest journalists in Kushtia District. In November 2006, a case was filed against Islam over the murder of Krishak League politician Basir Udin.

In 2007, the Anti-Corruption Commission identified Islam as a corruption suspect. The commission and two army officers from the National Coordination Committee Against Corruption and Crime had found evidence against Islam of embezzlement of public school teachers salary, illegal sand mining from the local river, harassing journalists, and embezzlement from government contracts through manipulation of tenders. In February, seven cases were filed against Islam for attacking rallies of the opposition party. His house was raided but law enforcement failed to catch him. His brother and chairman of Bheramara municipality, Touhidul Islam Alam surrendered to joint forces. On 21 April 2007, his nephew, Lablu Malitha, was arrested from Kushtia by the Rapid Action Battalion. Malitha allegedly committed crimes under Islam's patronage and had 18 criminal cases against him. Islam was the president of Kushtia District unit of Bangladesh Nationalist Party. From 2001 to 2006, six billion taka was sanctioned for development in his constituency and many of the contracts went to his relatives. He had imported a Lexus under his duty free quota as a member of parliament. In September, his wife submitted his wealth statement to the Anti-Corruption Commission.

On 12 November 2008, Islam spoke at an election rally though a phone as he had not visited the area since 2007 after the caretaker government took power. Bangladesh Jamaat-e-Islami sought the Kushtia-2 seat nomination from their coalition partner, Bangladesh Nationalist Party but the party nominated Islam.

Islam contested the 2008 Bangladeshi general election from Kushtia-2 as a candidate of the Bangladesh Nationalist Party. He lost the election with 107,527 votes while the winner Hasanul Haq Inu of Jatiya Samajtantrik Dal received 165,952 votes.

Islam along with the rest of Bangladesh Nationalist Party boycotted the 2014 Bangladeshi general election and Hasanul Haq Inu of Jatiya Samajtantrik Dal was elected from Kushtia-2 unopposed.
