= Abdul Waheed Khan =

Abdul Waheed Khan may refer to:

- Abdul Wahid Khan, Hindustani classical vocalist
- Abdul Waheed Khan (UNESCO official), Assistant Director-General for Communication and Information at UNESCO
- Abdul Waheed (field hockey), Abdul Waheed Khan, Athlete whose Hockey team won gold at the 1960 Olympics
