= Bheramara Municipality =

Coordinates: 24°01′17″N 88°59′31″E

Bheramara Municipality is the administrative capital of Bheramara Upazila. It has nine wards and 15 mahalas covering 3.26 square kilometer. It has a population of 22,124.

On 2 March 2007, Bheramara Municipality mayor and brother of member of parliament Shahidul Islam, Touhidul Isam Alam, was detained as part of a crackdown on corruption. Seven cases were filed against the mayor.

During Bheramara Municipality elections in 2021, SM Tanvir Arafat, superintendent of police of Kushtia District, misbehaved with Judicial Magistrate Mohsin Hasan for which he was summoned by Bangladesh High Court. Hasan had filed a complaint against Arafat over the incident alleging violation of the Local Government Election Rules, 2010. The District police briefly detained Presiding Officer Shahjahan Ali who was a witness to the incident. Arafat apologized to the High Court Division bench of Justice Khizir Hayat and Justice Mamnoon Rahman for his behavior after answering his summons.
