= Kushtia-3 =

Bangladeshi parliamentary constituency

Coordinates: 23.91°N 89.12°E

- Constituency for the Jatiya Sangsad
- District: Kushtia District
- Division: Khulna Division
- Electorate: 440,842 (2026)

Current constituency
- Created: 1973
- Party: Bangladesh Jamaat-e-Islami
- Member: Amir Hamza
- ← 76 Kushtia-2 78 Kushtia-4 →

Kushtia-3 is a constituency represented in the Jatiya Sangsad (National Parliament) of Bangladesh since 2026 by Amir Hamza of the Bangladesh Jamaat-e-Islami.

== Boundaries ==
The constituency encompasses Kushtia Sadar Upazila.

== History ==
The constituency was created for the first general elections in newly independent Bangladesh, held in 1973.

== Members of Parliament ==
Election	Member	Party
1973	M Amir-ul Islam	Awami League
1979	Shah Azizur Rahman	Bangladesh Nationalist Party
Major Boundary Changes
1986	Syed Altaf Hossain	National Awami Party
1988	Mohammad Badruddoza	Jatiya Party
1991	Abdul Khaleq Chantu	Bangladesh Nationalist Party
Feb 1996	Sohrab Uddin	Bangladesh Nationalist Party
Jun 1996	Abdul Khaleq Chantu	Bangladesh Nationalist Party
2001	Sohrab Uddin	Bangladesh Nationalist Party
2008	Khandaker Rashiduzzaman Dudu	Awami League
2014	Mahbubul Alam Hanif	Awami League
2018	Mahbubul Alam Hanif	Awami League
2024	Mahbubul Alam Hanif	Awami League
2026	Amir Hamza	Bangladesh Jamaat-e-Islami

== Elections ==
=== Elections in the 2020s ===
General Election 2026: Kushtia-3
Party	Candidate	Votes	%	±%
Jamaat	Amir Hamza	182,476	57.7	N/A
BNP	Md. Zakir Hossain Sarkar	127,559	40.3	N/A
IAB	Md. Abdullah Akhand	5,153	1.6	N/A
Bangladesh Republican Party	Mosammat Rumpa Khatun	475	0.2	N/A
BSD	Mir Nazmul Islam	442	0.1	N/A
GOP	Mohammad Shariful Islam	299	0.1	N/A
Majority		54,917	17.4	N/A
Turnout		316,404	71.8	N/A
Jamaat gain from AL				

=== Elections in the 2010s ===
General Election 2014: Kushtia-3
Party	Candidate	Votes	%	±%
AL	Mahbubul Alam Hanif	105,577	94.3	+43.9
BNF	Rokib Ur Rahman Khan Chowdhury	6,411	5.7	N/A
Majority		99,166	88.6	+85.4
Turnout		111,988	33.6	−54.9
AL hold				

=== Elections in the 2000s ===
General Election 2008: Kushtia-3
Party	Candidate	Votes	%	±%
AL	Khandaker Rashiduzzaman Dudu	135,125	50.4	+13.3
BNP	Sohrab Uddin	126,554	47.2	−13.9
IAB	Md. Rahat Ali Bishwas	4,245	1.6	N/A
BSD	Shafiur Rahman Shafi	840	0.3	N/A
National People's Party	Md. Abu Ahad Al Mamun	509	0.2	N/A
BDB	Abu Muzaffar Ahmad	423	0.2	N/A
FP	Sheikh Motiar Rahman	319	0.1	N/A
Majority		8,571	3.2	−20.8
Turnout		268,015	88.5	+5.7
AL gain from BNP				

General Election 2001: Kushtia-3
Party	Candidate	Votes	%	±%
BNP	Sohrab Uddin	138,747	61.1	+21.7
AL	M Amir-ul Islam	84,289	37.1	+6.6
IJOF	Nafiz Ahmmed Khan Tito	3,298	1.5	N/A
Bangladesh Samajtantrik Dal (Basad-Khalekuzzaman)	Abdullah Al Mamun	392	0.2	N/A
Jatiya Party (M)	Md. Jahangir Hossain	281	0.1	N/A
Independent	Wasim Uddin Master	224	0.1	N/A
Independent	Md. Jahurul Islam	26	0.0	N/A
Majority		54,458	24.0	+15.1
Turnout		227,257	82.8	−1.5
BNP hold				

=== Elections in the 1990s ===
General Election June 1996: Kushtia-3
Party	Candidate	Votes	%	±%
BNP	Abdul Khaleq Chantu	72,260	39.4	−2.7
AL	Anwar Ali	55,889	30.5	+7.5
Jamaat	Md. Anisur Rahman	30,983	16.9	−1.8
JP(E)	Jafar Ullah Khan Chowdhury	20,512	11.2	+8.7
IOJ	Dewan Abdul Khaleq	2,604	1.4	+0.5
Bangladesh Samajtantrik Dal (Khalekuzzaman)	Abdullah Al Mamun	551	0.3	N/A
FP	Liakot Ali	233	0.1	N/A
Independent	M Amir-ul Islam	230	0.1	−8.0
Majority		16,371	8.9	−10.3
Turnout		183,262	84.3	+15.7
BNP hold				

General Election 1991: Kushtia-3
Party	Candidate	Votes	%	±%
BNP	Abdul Khaleq Chantu	62,180	42.1	
AL	Anwar Ali	33,862	23.0	
Jamaat	Anisur Rahman	27,653	18.7	
Independent	M Amir-ul Islam	11,929	8.1	
UCL	Md. Nur Ahmed Bokul	5,668	3.8	
JP(E)	S. M. Aziaul Haq	3,637	2.5	
IOJ	Md. Sirajul Haq	1,265	0.9	
Zaker Party	Md. Rafiq Khan Khokon	533	0.4	
NDP	A. K. M. Masud	407	0.3	
Independent	Wasim Uddin Master	231	0.2	
JSD (S)	Saidur Rahman	213	0.1	
Majority		28,318	19.2	
Turnout		147,578	68.6	
BNP gain from				
