= Ahsan Habib Lincoln =

Bangladeshi politician

Member of Bangladesh Parliament
- In office 1988–1991
- Preceded by: Abdul Wahed
- Succeeded by: Abdur Rouf Chowdhury

Personal details
- Born: March 24, 1959 Khemirdiyar, Bheramara Thana, Kushtia District, East Pakistan
- Party: Jatiya Party (Ershad)

Ahsan Habib Lincoln is a Jatiya Party (Ershad) politician in Bangladesh and a former member of parliament for Kushtia-2.

== Birth ==
Ahsan Habib Lincoln was born on March 24, 1959, in the village of Khemirdia, Bheramara Thana, Mokarimpur Union, Kushtia District.

== Career ==
Lincoln was elected to parliament from Kushtia-2 as a Jatiya Party candidate in 1988. He is a politician of the Jatiya Party (Zafar) fraction.

Lincoln contested the 2018 election as a candidate of Bangladesh Nationalist Party from Kushtia-2.
