= National Coordination Committee Against Corruption and Crime =

Short-lived Bangladeshi government agency

- দুর্নীতি ও অপরাধবিরোধী জাতীয় সমন্বয় কমিটি
- Abbreviation: NCCACC
- Formation: 2007; 19 years ago
- Dissolved: 2008; 18 years ago
- Headquarters: Dhaka, Bangladesh
- Region served: Bangladesh
- Official language: Bengali
- Parent organization: Ministry of Home Affairs

The National Coordination Committee Against Corruption and Crime was a short-lived Bangladesh government agency responsible for investigating corruption and crime. It was formed by the Fakhruddin Ahmed led caretaker government during the 2006–2008 Bangladeshi political crisis and was led by Bangladesh Army officers.

== History ==
The National Coordination Committee Against Corruption and Crime was created in 2007 as an informal authority with significant powers. The creation of the committee was overseen by M. A. Matin, the then communication advisor to the caretaker government and retired major general of Bangladesh Army. Matin was later placed in charge of the Ministry of Home Affairs in January 2008 a position which had always been held by the chief advisor in the past. In March 2007, General Masud Uddin Chowdhury was appointed chief coordinator of the committee. The Central committee included all seven General Officer Commanding of the Bangladesh Army. The committee would have the power to detain any suspect without warrants and have a presence in all cities and districts of Bangladesh.

National Coordination Committee Against Corruption and Crime investigated allegations against Shahidul Islam, former Member of Parliament of Kushtia-2, in October 2007. It recommended the Anti Corruption Commission file cases against Islam.

The Daily Star wrote in January 2008, that despite one year of the committee operating corruption was rampant. The committee was targeting politicians over corruption suspects from other professions.

National Coordination Committee Against Corruption and Crime helped Bangladesh Telegraph & Telephone Board investigate corruption and irregularities within the board in June 2008. It investigated the delayed launch of the state owned cellular company TeleTalk. It investigated and found evidence of corruption against Thermax Group chairman Kader Mollah who was a former employee of Titas Gas. It had found one employee of Titas Gas, Abdul Kader Mollah, had accumulated 21 billion BDT. It had found evidence of corruption against 68 employees of Titas Gas. In June 2008, General Masud resigned from the post of chief coordinator of the committee. He was transferred from principal staff officer of the Armed Forces Division to the Ministry of Foreign Affairs.

The Committee got the National Board of Revenue to freeze 298 bank accounts that it had found irregularities. The account holders included Arafat Rahman Koko, Shamim Iskandar (brother of former Prime Minister Khaleda Zia), Amanullah Aman, Anwar Hossain Monju, Mustafa Kamal, A. K. M. Mosharraf Hossain, AFM Bahauddin Nasim, Ali Asgar Lobi, A. B. M. Mohiuddin Chowdhury, Abul Hasnat Abdullah, Dewan Md. Salauddin, Dipjol, Harris Chowdhury, Habibul Islam Habib, Kazi Salimul Haq, Joynal Hazari, Shahrin Islam Tuhin, Giasuddin Al Mamun, Mirza Abbas, Mohiuddin Khan Alamgir, Moudud Ahmed, Mosharraf Hossain, Mohammad Mosaddak Ali, Mohammad Nasim, M. Naser Rahman, M. Rashiduzzaman Millat, Pankaj Debnath, Shahjahan Siraj, Shahjahan Omar, Nazmul Huda, Salahuddin Quader Chowdhury, Mir Mohammad Nasiruddin, Iqbal Hasan Mahmud Tuku, Ziaul Haque Zia, Sheikh Tayebur Rahman, Wadud Bhuiyan, and Salman F Rahman.

In July 2008, the committee recommended the government reopen and give North Bengal Paper Mills Limited to Bangladesh Army. It also recommended reopening Khulna Newsprint Mills Limited and Chittagong Chemical Complex Limited which were state owned companies closed due to long running operating losses. In August 2008, the committee recommended 145 cases to the Truth and Accountability Commission. Corruption suspects could submit their "illicit wealth" to get "clemency" from the commission.

The National Coordination Committee Against Corruption and Crime was dissolved in December 2008. General Masud was appointed High Commissioner of Bangladesh to Australia.

== Legacy ==
In 2017, Bangladesh Supreme Court ordered the government to return money to corruption suspects who had deposited money with the Truth and Accountability Commission following the crackdown by the committee with amounts determined by the Directorate General of Forces Intelligence. It had collected ৳6.5 billion (equivalent to ৳19 billion or US$160 million in 2024) which the court deemed was illegal.
