= Bahadurpur Union =

Bahadurpur Union may refer to:

- Bahadurpur Union, Bheramara, a union in Bheramara Upazila
- Bahadurpur Union, Sharsha, a union in sharsha Upazila
