= Sohrab Uddin (disambiguation) =

Sohrab Uddin may refer to:

- Sohrab Uddin is a Bangladesh Nationalist Party politician and the former Member of Parliament from Kushtia-3
- Suhrab Uddin is a Bangladesh Awami League politician and the incumbent Member of Parliament from Kishoreganj-2
- Surabuddin Mollick is an Indian footballer
- Death of Sohrabuddin Sheikh
