= Mohammad Badruddoza =

Bangladeshi politician

Mohammad Badruddoza Gama

Member of Bangladesh Parliament
- In office 1988–1990
- Preceded by: Syed Altaf Hossain
- Succeeded by: K M Abdul Khaleq Chontu

Personal details
- Died: 29 July 2017 Dhaka, Bangladesh
- Party: Jatiya Party

Mohammad Badruddoza (Bengali: মো. বদরুদ্দোজা গামা) was a politician in Bangladesh and member of parliament for Kushtia-3.

== Career ==
Badruddoza was elected to parliament from Kushtia-3 as a Combined opposition candidate in 1988.

== Death ==
Badruddoza died on 29 July 2017 at Delta Medical College and Hospital, Dhaka, Bangladesh.
