= Selina Shahid =

Bangladeshi politician

Member of Bangladesh Parliament
- In office 1991–1996

Personal details
- Party: Bangladesh Nationalist Party

Selina Shahid is a Bangladesh Nationalist Party politician who was a member of parliament from a reserved seat from 1991 to 1996. Her husband, Shahidul Islam, was a member of parliament from Kushtia-2.

== Career ==
Shahid was elected to parliament from a reserved seat as a Bangladesh Nationalist Party candidate in 1991.
