= Afjal Hossain =

Bangladeshi politician and businessman

Md. Afjal Hossain

Member of Parliament for Kushtia-4
- Incumbent
- Assumed office 12 February 2026
- Preceded by: Abdur Rouf

Personal details
- Party: Bangladesh Jamaat-e-Islami
- Occupation: Businessman and politician

Md. Afjal Hossain is a Bangladeshi politician and businessman. He is an elected Member of Parliament from the Kushtia-4 (Kumarkhali–Khoksa) constituency.
