= Selim Altaf George =

Bangladeshi politician (born 1975)

- সেলিম আলতাফ জর্জ
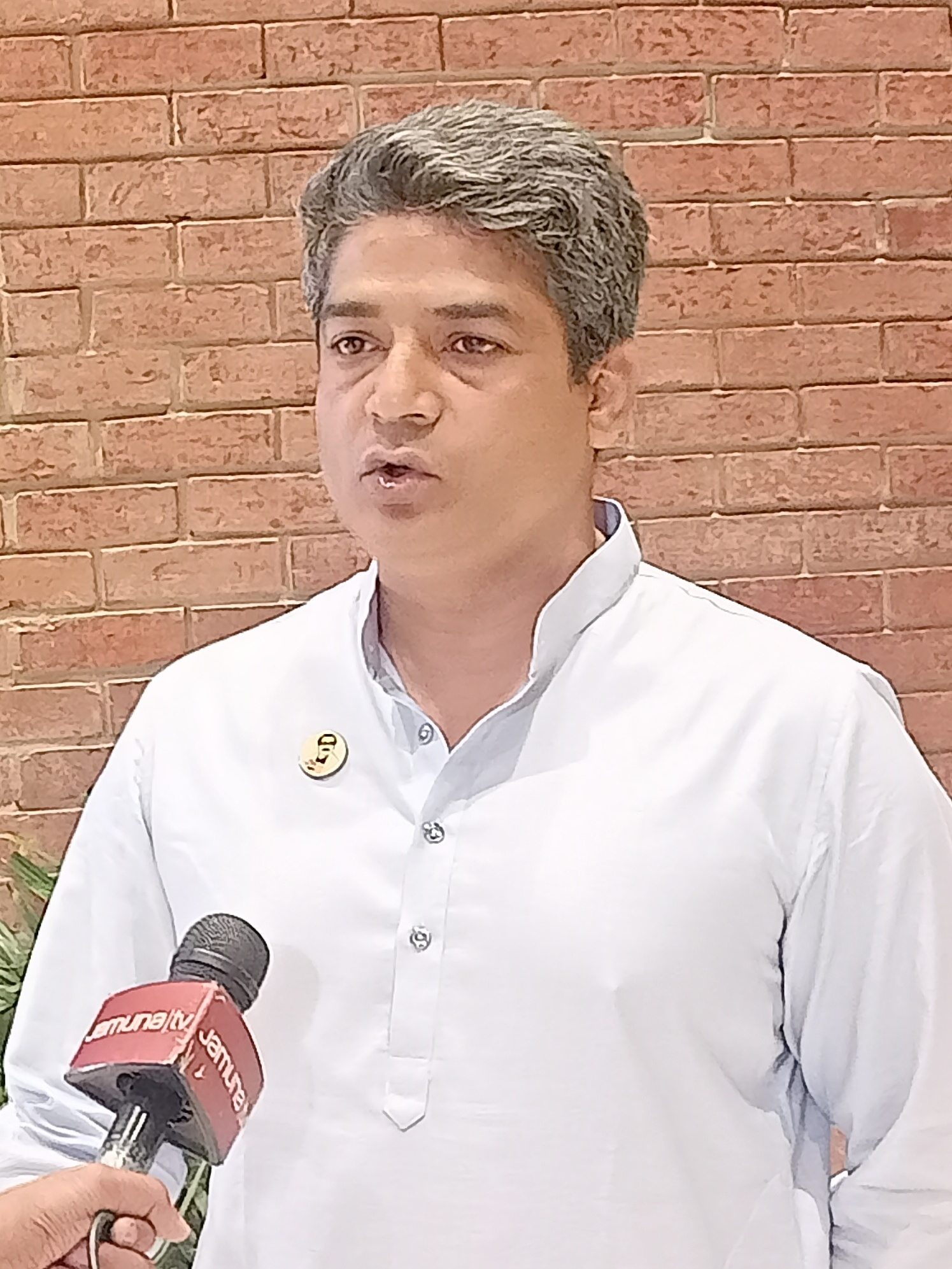
- George in 2023

Member of the Bangladesh Parliament for Kushtia-4
- In office 29 January 2019 – 29 January 2024
- Preceded by: Abdur Rouf
- Succeeded by: Abdur Rouf

Personal details
- Born: 19 October 1975 (age 50)
- Party: Bangladesh Awami League
- Relatives: Golam Kibria (grandfather)
- Profession: Lawyer

Selim Altaf George (born 19 October 1975) is a Bangladesh Awami League politician and former Jatiya Sangsad member representing the Kushtia-4 constituency.

== Career ==
George was elected to parliament from Kushtia-4 as a Bangladesh Awami League candidate on 30 December 2018.

George lost the 2024 general election to independent candidate Abdur Rouf.

George was arrested after the fall of the Sheikh Hasina led Awami League government in September 2024 by Detective Branch.
