= Abul Hossain Tarun =

Bangladeshi politician

- আবুল হোসেন তরুণ

Member of the Bangladesh Parliament for Kushtia-4
- In office 1986–1988
- Preceded by: Md. Abdul Haque
- Succeeded by: Nur Alam Ziku

Personal details
- Died: 1997
- Party: Bangladesh Awami League
- Spouse: Sultana Tarun
- Parent: Mohammad Golam Kibria (father)

Abul Hossain Tarun (died 1997) was a Bangladesh Awami League politician and a member of the Jatiya Sangsad representing the Kushtia-4 constituency during 1986–1988. His father, Mohammad Golam Kibria, was a member of parliament.

== Career ==
Tarun was elected to parliament from Kushtia-4 as a Bangladesh Awami League candidate in 1986.
