= Nur Alam Ziku =

Bangladeshi politician

- নূর আলম জিকু

Member of Jatiya Sangsad
- In office 1988–1990
- Preceded by: Abul Hossain Tarun
- Succeeded by: Abdul Awal Mia
- Constituency: Kushtia-4

Personal details
- Born: 26 October 1938 Haripur, Burdwan district, Bengal Presidency
- Died: 21 February 2010 (aged 71) Dhaka, Bangladesh
- Party: Jatiya Samajtantrik Dal-JSD

Nur Alam Ziku (Bengali: নূর আলম জিকু; 26 October 1938 – 21 February 2010) was a Bangladeshi politician, freedom fighter, actor and filmmaker. He was one of the founders of Jatiya Samajtantrik Dal-JSD.

== Early life and education ==
Ziku was born on 26 October 1938 to a Bengali family of Muslim Syeds in the village of Haripur in Galsi, Burdwan district, Bengal Presidency. He was the son of Syed Abdul Muhid and Syeda Hajera Khatun. He completed his studies at the Galsi High School, before migrating to Kushtia in East Bengal on 7 July 1950 alongside his sister Syeda Najma Begum and brother-in-law Khalilur Rahman. After that, he joined the Muslim High School in Kushtia. Ziku participated in the Bengali language movement in 1952 whilst still a ninth grade student. So he was arrested in 23 February. He was eventually released on 9 June. His father had died four days earlier. Ziku was awarded a first class in his matriculation in 1954, and then enrolled at the Kushtia College, where he was eventually elected as the vice-president of the Students' Union. He also participated in the side of United Front during the 1954 East Bengal Legislative Assembly election. Due to being busy with politics he delayed sitting his Higher Secondary Certificate until 1958. He eventually graduated with honours from the University of Rajshahi with a Bachelor of Arts in Bengali language. In 1959, he was the elected senior vice-president of the Central Committee of the Chhatra League.

He married Tahmina Rukhsana Alam from the Nawab family of Dhaka in August 1966, and moved from Kushtia to Kumarkhali a year later. One of his sons, Syed Saimun Kanak, was also a politician of Jatiya Samajtantrik Dal-JSD.

== Career ==
It was under the leadership of Nur Alam Ziku that the freedom fighters in this region fought against the Pakistan Army by taking rifles from India. Just as he was a handsome officer with a heroic appearance and a smile that made pearls flow, his political and cultural activities also contributed to the national cause. He was not only an actor, director or producer, but also a member of the board of the Bangladesh Film Development Corporation (BFDCC). This talented man has found a place in the hearts of many people in Kumarkhali. In 1962, he was one of the architects of the student movement against the notorious Hamidur Rahman Education Commissioner. As a result, he was imprisoned again. In 1962, he actively participated in the presidential election against Ayub Khan on behalf of Fatima Jinnah and played the role of the main coordinator in the Khulna district. In 1962, he joined the Masters of Arts from Dhaka University with the degree of L.L. From 1962, he joined the Swadhin Bangla Nucleus. In 1963, he entered the film industry and took a job at the famous director Salauddin's "Salauddin Production". In order to protect Bengali cinema from being destroyed in the face of the aggression in Urdu cinema, Salauddin Saheb made the film "Roopban". In this film, Nur Alam Ziku made his debut as the main assistant director and actor. In 1964, he served as the Chief Election Commissioner at the Chhatra League conference. In that committee, Sheikh Fazlul Haque Mani was elected as the president and Serajul Alam Khan as the general secretary.

Nur Alam Ji took an active part in the Six point movement in 1966, the 1969 East Pakistan mass uprising, and the 1970 Pakistani general election. After the massacre of 25 March 1971, he crossed the border on 2 April and went to West Bengal for training and preparation for war. With the support of the then Prime Minister of India, Indira Gandhi, he was selected to train and serve in the 1st Brigade of the 'Ta-Ua' Sonbisa in the "Dordunar Chakratha" area. Later, he actively participated in the freedom struggle as the Deputy Commander of the South-Western Front of the Bangladesh Liberation Force (BLF).

Ziku was elected to parliament from Kushtia-4 as a Combined Opposition Party candidate in 1988.

== Death ==
Ziku died on 21 February 2010 in Dhaka, Bangladesh.
