= Khandaker Rashiduzzaman Dudu =

Bangladeshi politician

Khandaker Rashiduzzaman

Member of the Bangladesh Parliament
- In office 25 January 2009 – 24 January 2014
- Preceded by: Sohrab Uddin
- Succeeded by: Mahbubul Alam Hanif

Personal details
- Born: 6 September 1944 Kushtia Sadar Upazila, Jhaudia Union, Kushtia, British India
- Died: 4 February 2014 (aged 69) Apollo Hospital Dhaka, Bangladesh
- Party: Bangladesh Awami League
- Nickname: Dudu

Khandaker Rashiduzzaman was a Bangladesh Awami League politician and member of parliament from Kushtia-3.

== Career ==
Kh Rashiduzzaman was the vice-president of Kushtia Government College unit of Bangladesh Chhatra League. He served as the chairman of Rupali Bank for five years. He was the president of Federation of Bangladesh Chambers of Commerce and Industry and Kushtia Chambers of Commerce. He served as the president of Kushtia District unit of Bangladesh Awami League and former president of Kushtia District unit of Bangladesh Jubo League. He was elected to the 9th parliament in 2008 from Kushtia-3 as a candidate of Bangladesh Awami League.

== Death ==
He died on 4 February 2014 in Apollo Hospital Dhaka, Bangladesh. He is survived by his wife, son, and 2 daughters; one of whom is a director at Bashundhara Group.
