= Kamarul Arefin =

Bangladeshi politician

Md. Kamarul Arefin
- মোঃ কামারুল আরেফিন

Member of the Bangladesh Parliament for Kushtia-2
- In office 10 January 2024 – 6 August 2024
- Preceded by: Hasanul Haq Inu
- Succeeded by: Abdul Gafur

Personal details
- Born: 24 February 1963 (age 63)
- Party: Independent
- Occupation: Politician

Kamarul Arefin (born 24 February 1963) is a Bangladeshi politician and a former member of the Jatiya Sangsad representing the Kushtia-2 constituency.

Arefin became involved with student politics in the 1980s. He was elected chairman of Sadarpur Union in 2011. He was elected chairman of Mirpur Upazila in 2014, and was reelected in 2018.
