= Sultana Tarun =

Bangladeshi politician

- সুলতানা তরুণ

Member of Parliament

Member of Parliament for Kushtia-4
- In office 2008–2013
- Preceded by: Syed Mehedi Ahmed Rumi
- Succeeded by: Abdur Rouf

Personal details
- Born: 20 January 1955 (age 70)
- Party: Bangladesh Awami League
- Spouse: Abul Hossain Tarun (died 1997)
- Education: Class VIII
- Committees: Standing Committee on Ministry of Women and Children Affairs

Sultana Tarun is a Bangladesh Awami League politician and the former Member of Parliament from Kushtia-4.

== Career ==
Tarun was elected to Parliament in 2008 from Kushtia-4 as a Bangladesh Awami League candidate. She is the widow of former Awami League Member of Parliament Abul Hossain Tarun. She was member of the Parliamentary Standing Committee on Ministry of Women and Children Affairs.
