= Md. Abdul Haque =

Bangladeshi politician

- মোহাম্মদ আব্দুল হক

Member of Bangladesh Parliament

Member of Parliament for Kushtia-4
- In office 1979–1986
- Preceded by: Mohammad Golam Kibria
- Succeeded by: Abul Hossain Tarun

Personal details
- Party: Bangladesh Nationalist Party

Md. Abdul Haque is a Bangladesh Nationalist Party politician and a former member of parliament for Kushtia-4.

== Career ==
Haque was a member of the 3rd National Assembly of Pakistan representing Kushtia-1.

Haque was elected to parliament from Kushtia-4 as a Bangladesh Nationalist Party candidate in 1979.
