= Abdur Rouf Chowdhury =

Bangladeshi politician

Abdur Rauf Chowdhury

Member of the Bangladesh Parliament for Kushtia-2
- In office 27 February 1991 – 15 February 1996
- Preceded by: Ahsan Habib Lincoln
- Succeeded by: Shahidul Islam
- In office 7 March 1973 – 18 February 1979
- Preceded by: Position created
- Succeeded by: Zillur Rahman

Personal details
- Died: 24 July 2014 (aged 81) Dhaka, Bangladesh
- Party: Bangladesh Nationalist Party
- Children: Raghib Rauf Chowdhury

Abdur Rauf Chowdhury (died on 24 July 2014) was a Bangladesh Nationalist Party politician who was a Jatiya Sangsad member representing the Kushtia-2 constituency.

== Career ==
Chowdhury was a veteran of Bangladesh Liberation War.

Chowdhury was elected to parliament from Kushtia-2 as a Bangladesh Awami League candidate in 1973. He was elected in 1991 as a Bangladesh Nationalist Party candidate from Kushtia-3.

Chowdhury refused to participate in the February 1996 election due to no party other than the Bangladesh Nationalist Party contesting the election. The nomination went to Shahidul Islam.

Chowdhury died on 24 July 2014 in Dhaka.

== Personal life ==
Chowdhury's son, barrister Raghib Rauf Chowdhury, is the office secretary of the lawyers unit of Bangladesh Nationalist Party.
