= Hasanul Haq Inu =

Bangladeshi politician (born 1946)

- হাসানুল হক ইনু
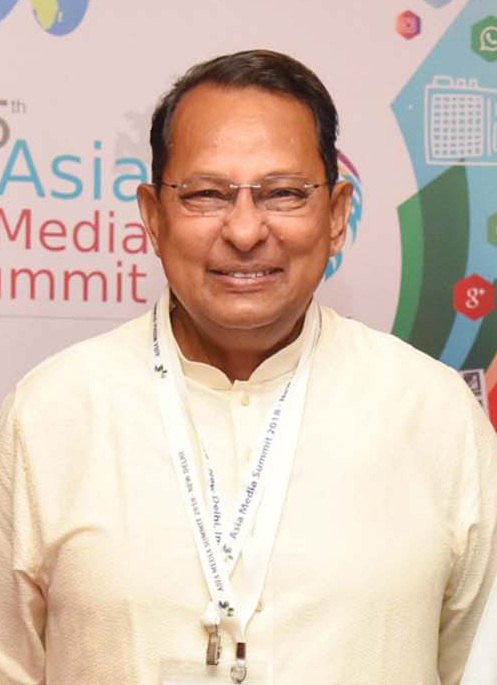
- Inu in 2018

Member of the Bangladesh Parliament
- In office 29 December 2008 – 9 January 2024
- Preceded by: Shahidul Islam
- Succeeded by: Kamarul Arefin
- Parliamentary group: Grand Alliance
- Constituency: Kushtia-2

Minister of Information and Broadcasting
- In office 13 September 2012 – 7 January 2019
- Prime Minister: Sheikh Hasina
- Preceded by: Abul Kalam Azad
- Succeeded by: Muhammad Hasan Mahmud

Personal details
- Born: 12 November 1946 (age 79) Kushtia, Nadia District, Bengal Presidency, British India (now Bheramara, Kushtia District, Bangladesh)
- Party: Jatiya Samajtantrik Dal
- Spouse: Afroza Haque Rina
- Education: Notre Dame College, Dhaka; Bangladesh University of Engineering and Technology

Hasanul Haq Inu (born 12 November 1946) is a Bangladeshi politician and former Minister of Information. He is the leader of a faction of the Jatiya Samajtantrik Dal (JASAD), a left-leaning political party in Bangladesh. Inu served as a Member of Parliament representing Kushtia-2 and held the position of Information and Broadcasting Minister from 13 September 2012 to 7 January 2019 in the Awami League-led government.

== Early life and education ==
Inu was born in Bheramara, Kushtia District to A H M Qamrul Haq, an employee of Karnaphuli Paper Mills, and Begum Hasna Hena Haq. Inu graduated with a degree in chemical engineering from the East Pakistan University of Engineering and Technology in 1970.

== Political career ==
Inu joined Bangladesh Chhatra League in 1968, and was appointed the general secretary of its Engineering University unit in 1969.

=== 1972–1975 ===
After the independence of Bangladesh, Bangladesh Chhatra League, the student wing affiliated with the Bangladesh Awami League split following ideological differences between Sheikh Mujibur Rahman's nephew Sheikh Fazlul Haque Mani, forming Jatiya Samajtantrik Dal, led by Serajul Alam Khan. Hasanul Haq Inu joined this faction.

The party called for establishing socialism through an armed revolution. It had an armed wing, Gonobahini, which led a violent insurgency against the government of Sheikh Mujibur Rahman. In 1974, Hasanul Haq Inu led a group of armed men to attack the residence of the then Home Minister Mansur Ali, which resulted in the 1974 Ramna massacre. He also distributed anti-government leaflets.

=== After the assassination of Sheikh Mujibur Rahman ===
After the assassination of Sheikh Mujibur Rahman and his family in 1975, Inu along with Gonobahini's military leader Colonel Abu Taher rescued army chief Ziaur Rahman from house arrest, to facilitate a Marxist takeover of power. On 7 November 1975, Inu led assault on the Indian high commission to kidnap the high Commissioner Samar Sen. Ziaur Rahman realised that the disorder set off by the soldiers' mutiny had to be suppressed firmly if discipline was to be restored in the army. Ziaur Rahman declared martial law and cracked down on the Jatiyo Samajtantrik Dal. Abu Taher was sentenced to death by a military tribunal on charges of treason, and Inu was sentenced to life in prison.

=== Since 2008 ===
Inu was elected from Kushtia-2 in the Bangladesh Parliament. He is the president of a faction of the Jatiyo Samajtantrik Dal, which is a member of the Awami League led coalition government in Bangladesh. He was appointed minister of Information in 2012, replacing Abul Kalam Azad. This appointment occurred despite protests from senior Awami League leaders.

As an only Bangladesh Government high ranking minister Hasanul Haq publicly protested Bharatiya Janata Party president Amit Shah's remarks, describing Bangladeshis as 'termites'. In a strongly worded rebuke, Inu said at a public rally: "Amit Shah has made an unwanted remark by describing Bangladeshis as termites. We in Dhaka do not give any importance to his statement as it does not carry the gravity of an official statement of India". His comments were widely reported in Indian media and welcomed by Bangladesh social media users. Other opposition leaders also hold him responsible for Sheikh Mujib's killing.

When commenting on Inu's activities in 1972– 1975, Bangladesh Nationalist Party leader Ruhul Kabir Rizvi said: "Inu's attitude at that time was like that of militant kingpins Laden, Zawahiri and Shaykh Abdur Rahman." He also demanded his trial for his crimes before a people's court.

Inu contested the national election on 7 January 2024 as an Awami League candidate. He received 92,455 votes but lost to Kamarul Arefin who received 115,799 votes. Inu alleged the vote was rigged.

== Conviction ==
After the resignation of Sheikh Hasina, Inu along with Rashed Khan Menon was charged with a case of murder during the quota-reform movement and was subsequently arrested.

On 30 June 2026, the International Crimes Tribunal (Bangladesh) convicted and sentenced Inu to 10 years' imprisonment for crimes against humanity for the killings of six people in Kushtia during the 2024 July Mass Uprising.
