= North Bengal Paper Mills Limited =

Bangladeshi state-owned paper mill

- Abbreviation: NBPM
- Formation: 1975
- Headquarters: Pabna District, Bangladesh
- Region served: Bangladesh
- Official language: Bengali

North Bengal Paper Mills Limited (Bengali: নর্থ বেঙ্গল পেপার মিলস) is a closed Bangladeshi state owned paper mill. It was under the Bangladesh Chemical Industries Corporation of the Ministry of Industries.

North Bengal Paper Mills School is attached to the mill and was one of the best performing schools in 2012 SSC exams in Pabna District.

== History ==
The construction of the factory started in March 1967 by the East Pakistan Industrial Development Corporation. Initial test manufacturing took place at the factory in 1970. During Bangladesh Liberation War in 1971, the original factory was heavily damaged.

North Bengal Paper Mills Limited started operations in 1975 after repairing the damage from the war. The mill is built on 133.54 acres site. It was built on the banks of Padma River in Pabna District. Its output was 15 thousand tons per month.

In 2002, North Bengal Paper Mills Limited was closed down by the government of Bangladesh. The mill had incurred losses amounting to 3.28 billion BDT since 1975. Around a thousand employees were working at the mill. Matiur Rahman Nizami, minister of industries, and Imamuzzaman Chowdhury, chairman of Bangladesh Chemical Industries Corporation, discussed reopening the mill in 2004.

The government of Bangladesh tried to reopen the factory in 2006 but it was rejected at a meeting of the Cabinet Committee on Economic Affairs. In 2007, the Ministry of Industries considered privatizing the North Bengal Paper Mills Limited along with Dhaka Leather Company, Chittagong Chemical Complex, Karnaphuli Rayon and Chemicals Limited, and Bangladesh Can Company Limited according to the chairman of the Privatisation Commission, Abu Solaiman Chowdhury.

On 12 July 2008, the National Coordination Committee Against Corruption and Crime recommended that the government of Bangladesh hand over North Bengal Paper Mills Limited to the Bangladesh Army.

A delegation from China Yunnan Corporation visited the mill in 2011 to explore possibility of investing and reopening the mill.

In December 2020, the Rooppur Nuclear Power Plant announced plans to acquire 100 acres from the North Bengal Paper Mills Limited to establish a security outpost for the nuclear power plant.
