= Dharampur Union =

Dharampur Union ধরমপুর ইউনিয়ন
- Union
- Dharampur Union
- Location within Bangladesh
- Coordinates: 24.0207°N 88.9664°E
- Country: Bangladesh
- Division: Khulna
- District: Kushtia
- Upazila: Bheramara

Area
  - Total: 52.99 km^{2} (20.46 sq mi)

Population (2011)
  - Total: 35,169
  - Density: 663.7/km^{2} (1,719/sq mi)
- Time zone: UTC+6 (BST)
- Website: 5nodharampurup.kushtia.gov.bd

Dharampur Union (Bengali: ধরমপুর ইউনিয়ন) is a union parishad of Bheramara Upazila, in Kushtia District, Khulna Division of Bangladesh. The union has an area of 52.99 square kilometres (20.46 sq mi) and as of 2001 had a population of 35,169. There are 11 villages and 6 mouzas in the union.
