= Abdur Rouf (politician, born 1954) =

Bangladeshi politician

- আব্দুর রউফ

Member of Parliament for Kushtia-4
- In office 29 January 2024 – 7 August 2024
- Preceded by: Selim Altaf Gorge
- Succeeded by: Afjal Hossain
- In office 29 January 2014 – 29 January 2019
- Preceded by: Sultana Tarun
- Succeeded by: Selim Altaf Gorge

Personal details
- Born: 12 November 1954 (age 71)
- Party: Bangladesh Awami League
- Education: M.A
- Profession: Business, politics

Abdur Rouf (Bengali: আবদুর রউফ) is a Bangladesh Awami League politician and a former member of parliament from Kushtia-4.

== Early life ==
Abdur Rouf was born on 12 November 1954. He has an M.A. degree.

== Career ==
Abdur Rouf was elected to parliament on 5 January 2014 from Kushtia-4 as a Bangladesh Awami League candidate. On 4 July 2015, he prevented Brazilian wheat from entering the Kumarkhali Upazila Food department warehouse. The wheat had been imported by the government of Bangladesh for its social safety net program. According to Abdur Rouf, the wheat was substandard and had not been tested.

Rouf was arrested in October 2024 after the fall of the Sheikh Hasina-led Awami League government.
