= Juniadaha Union =

Juniadaha Union জুনিয়াদহ ইউনিয়ন
- Union
- Juniadaha Union
- Location within Bangladesh
- Coordinates: 24.0905°N 88.9245°E
- Country: Bangladesh
- Division: Khulna
- District: Kushtia
- Upazila: Bheramara

Area
  - Total: 78.94 km^{2} (30.48 sq mi)

Population (2011)
  - Total: 35,540
  - Density: 450.2/km^{2} (1,166/sq mi)
- Time zone: UTC+6 (BST)
- Website: 6nojuniadahup.kushtia.gov.bd

Juniadaha Union (Bengali: জুনিয়াদহ ইউনিয়ন) is a union parishad of Bheramara Upazila, in Kushtia District, Khulna Division of Bangladesh. The union has an area of 78.94 square kilometres (30.48 sq mi) and as of 2001 had a population of 35,540. There are 15 villages and 19 mouzas in the union.
