= Zillur Rahman (Kushtia politician) =

Bangladeshi politician

Advocate Zillur Rahman

Member of Bangladesh Parliament
- In office 1979–1986
- Preceded by: Abdur Rouf Chowdhury
- Succeeded by: Abdul Wahed

Personal details
- Party: Bangladesh Nationalist Party

Zillur Rahman is a Bangladesh Nationalist Party politician and a former member of parliament for Kushtia-2.

== Career ==
Rahman was elected to parliament from Kushtia-2 as a Bangladesh Nationalist Party candidate in 1979.
