= Abdul Gafur (Bangladeshi politician) =

Bangladeshi politician

Md Abdul Gafur
- আব্দুল গাফুর

Member of the Bangladesh Parliament for Kushtia-2
- Incumbent
- Assumed office 12 February 2026
- Preceded by: Kamarul Arefin

Personal details
- Party: Bangladesh Jamaat-e-Islami

Md Abdul Gafur is a Bangladesh Jamaat-e-Islami politician and businessman. He is the incumbent Jatiya Sangsad member representing the Kushtia-2 (Bheramara–Mirpur) constituency since February 2026.

== Early life and family ==
Gafur's father's name is Abdur Rahman and his mother's name is Rizia Khatun. He currently resides in Chauduar of Amla Union.

== Career ==
Gafur was elected chairman of Mirpur Upazila Parishad twice, in 2009 and 2013. He served as the chairman of Mirpur Upazila Parishad from February 2009 to 30 January 2013 and again from 13 May 2013 to 4 February 2014. He also previously served twice as a member of the Union Parishad and three times as chairman.

== Personal life ==
Gafur's son-in-law, Mizanur Rahman, 59, was arrested in September 2026, in connection with a case filed over an attack on New Gini Properties in Dhaka's ECB Chattar area.
