= Mahbubul Alam Hanif =

Bangladeshi politician

- মাহবুবউল আলম হানিফ
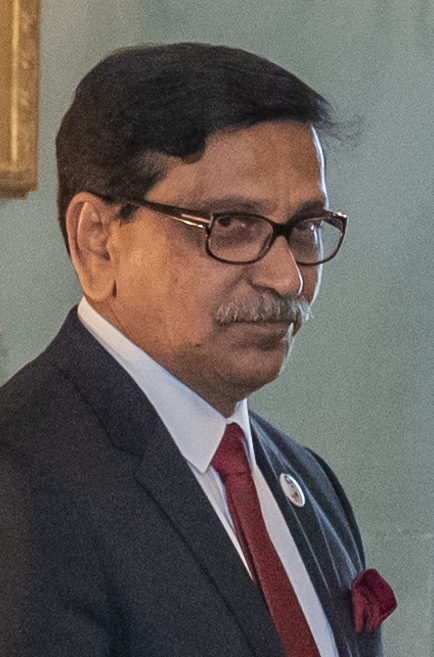
- Hanif in 2022

Member of the Bangladesh Parliament for Kushtia-3
- In office 29 January 2014 – 6 August 2024
- Preceded by: Khandaker Rashiduzzaman Dudu
- Succeeded by: Amir Hamza

Joint General Secretary of Awami League
- Incumbent
- Assumed office 21 December 2021

Personal details
- Born: 1 January 1959 (age 67) Kushtia, East Pakistan, Pakistan
- Party: Awami League
- Spouse: Fouzia Alam
- Relatives: Abdur Rab Serniabat
- Education: M.Com

Mahbubul Alam Hanif (born 1 January 1959) is a Bangladeshi politician and businessman. He is a former member of parliament for Kushtia-3. Currently he is a joint general secretary of the Awami League. He worked at the Prime Minister's Office as special assistant to Prime Minister Sheikh Hasina from 2009 to 2013.

== Early life and education ==
Hanif was born on 1 January 1959 to a Bengali Muslim family in the village of Sholadag in Bheramara, Kushtia District, East Pakistan. As his father was a railway official, he grew up in Pakshi Railway Colony, and it was here that he completed his primary and secondary education. His elder brother was the son-in-law of three-time minister Abdur Rab Serniabat.

After passing the HSC examination from Dhaka College, he became a student of the University of Dhaka in the Department of Management.

== Career ==
Hanif was elected joint general secretary of the Awami League in 2009. He worked at the Prime Minister's Office as special assistant to Prime Minister Sheikh Hasina from 2009 to 2013. During his service in PMO, he demanded the nomination for Kushtia-2, whose incumbent was Hasanul Haq Inu, president of Jatiya Samajtantrik Dal. He was fired from his job by the Ministry of Public Administration. He was given the nomination for Kushtia-3 and was elected as an Awami League candidate.

Hanif supported the construction of Medical College and Haripur Bridge, construction of Kushtia Bypass Road, and Kushtia District stadium. In addition, a swimming pool has been constructed in Kushtia city, and many roads have been constructed in the vicinity.

Construction of a 1000 MW power landing station has been completed in Kushtia. And 350 MW of power has been connected to the Bheramara Combined Cycle Power Plant. The Father of the Nation Bangabandhu Shishu Park is being constructed on about 35 acres of land on the banks of the Gorai River.

Following the fall of the Sheikh Hasina-led Awami League government, Hanif's home in Kushtia was burned down and destroyed with an excavator in February 2025. He was sentenced to death, in absentia, over the death of protestors against Hasina in 2024. He was 23rd Awami League leader sentenced to death after the fall of the Awami League government.
