= Kushtia-2 =

Constituency of Bangladesh's Jatiya Sangsad

Coordinates: 23.94°N 89.00°E

- Constituency for the Jatiya Sangsad
- District: Kushtia District
- Division: Khulna Division
- Electorate: 478,001 (2026)

Current constituency
- Created: 1973
- Party: Bangladesh Jamaat-e-Islami
- Member: Md. Abdul Gafur
- ← 75 Kushtia-1 77 Kushtia-3 →

Kushtia-2 is a constituency represented in the Jatiya Sangsad (National Parliament) of Bangladesh since 2026 by Md. Abdul Gafur of the Bangladesh Jamaat-e-Islami.

== Boundaries ==
The constituency encompasses Bheramara and Mirpur upazilas.

== History ==
The constituency was created for the first general elections in newly independent Bangladesh, held in 1973.

== Members of Parliament ==
Election	Member	Party
1973	Abdur Rouf Chowdhury	Awami League
1979	Zillur Rahman	Bangladesh Nationalist Party
Major Boundary Changes
1986	Abdul Wahed	Bangladesh Jamaat-e-Islami
1988	Ahsan Habib Lincoln	Jatiya Party
1991	Abdur Rouf Chowdhury	Bangladesh Nationalist Party
Feb 1996	Shahidul Islam	Bangladesh Nationalist Party
2001	Shahidul Islam	Bangladesh Nationalist Party
2008	Hasanul Haq Inu	Jatiya Samajtantrik Dal
2024	Kamarul Arefin	Independent
2026	Abdul Gafur	Bangladesh Jamaat-e-Islami

== Elections ==
=== Elections in the 2020s ===
General Election 2026: Kushtia-2
Party	Candidate	Votes	%	±%
Jamaat	Abdul Gafur	192,083	56.2	N/A
BNP	Ragib Rauf Chowdhury	143,821	42.1	N/A
IAB	Mohammad Ali	3,887	1.1	N/A
Islamic Front	Md. Babul Akter	1,123	0.3	N/A
CPB	Nur Uddin Ahmed	805	0.2	N/A
Majority		48,262	14.1	N/A
Turnout		341,719	71.5	N/A
Jamaat gain from Independent				

=== Elections in the 2010s ===
Hasanul Haq Inu was re-elected unopposed in the 2014 general election after opposition parties withdrew their candidacies in a boycott of the election.

=== Elections in the 2000s ===
General Election 2008: Kushtia-2
Party	Candidate	Votes	%	±%
JSD	Hasanul Haq Inu	165,952	57.3	+41.9
BNP	Shahidul Islam	107,527	37.1	−2.7
Independent	Md. Abdul Khalek	14,051	4.9	N/A
IAB	Md. Abdus Shalam	1,530	0.5	N/A
Independent	Md. Shahinur Ismal Nayb	363	0.1	N/A
Independent	Ahsan Habib Lincoln	183	0.1	N/A
Majority		58,425	20.2	+15.1
Turnout		289,606	91.4	+4.7
JSD gain from BNP				

General Election 2001: Kushtia-2
Party	Candidate	Votes	%	±%
BNP	Shahidul Islam	100,544	39.8	+6.7
AL	Mahbubul Alam Hanif	87,734	34.7	+20.0
JSD	Hasanul Haq Inu	38,877	15.4	+1.9
IJOF	Ahsan Habib Lincoln	25,334	10.0	N/A
Jatiya Party (M)	Abdus Samad Khan	225	0.1	N/A
Majority		12,810	5.1	−7.4
Turnout		252,714	86.7	+1.8
BNP hold				

=== Elections in the 1990s ===
General Election June 1996: Kushtia-2
Party	Candidate	Votes	%	±%
BNP	Shahidul Islam	64,389	33.1	−2.3
JP(E)	Ahsan Habib Lincoln	40,106	20.6	+3.2
Jamaat	Md. Abdul Wahib	30,632	15.7	−5.4
AL	Mahbubul Alam Hanif	28,544	14.7	+4.4
JSD	Hasanul Haq Inu	26,327	13.5	−1.6
IOJ	Md. Sirajul Haque	1,932	1.0	N/A
Independent	Md. Majibul Haque	1,149	0.6	N/A
Zaker Party	Md. Saidur Rahman	634	0.3	N/A
Bangladesh Jatiya League (Sobhan)	Md. Abdur Radhid	357	0.2	N/A
FP	Khandakar Sirajul Islam	235	0.1	N/A
Jatiya Janata Party (Asad)	Md. Marfat Ali Master	157	0.1	N/A
Independent	Md. Khaled Hossain	153	0.1	N/A
Bangladesh Janata Party	Muhammad Abdul Jabbar	125	0.1	N/A
Majority		24,283	12.5	−1.8
Turnout		194,740	84.9	+24.5
BNP hold				

General Election 1991: Kushtia-2
Party	Candidate	Votes	%	±%
BNP	Abdur Rouf Chowdhury	50,183	35.4	
Jamaat	Abdul Wahed	29,868	21.1	
JP(E)	Ahsan Habib Lincoln	24,615	17.4	
JSD	Hasanul Haq Inu	21,411	15.1	
AL	Md. Shafiul Islam	14,553	10.3	
Zaker Party	Md. Saidur Rahman	908	0.6	
FP	Md. Shakhawat Ibne Moin Chowdhury	134	0.1	
Majority		20,315	14.3	
Turnout		141,672	60.4	
BNP gain from JP(E)				
