= Kushtia-4 =

Constituency of Bangladesh's Jatiya Sangsad

Coordinates: 23.86°N 89.24°E

- Constituency for the Jatiya Sangsad
- District: Kushtia District
- Division: Khulna Division
- Electorate: 424,417 (2026)

Current constituency
- Created: 1973
- Party: Bangladesh Jamaat-e-Islami
- Member: Afjal Hossain
- ← 77 Kushtia-3 79 Chuadanga-1 →

Kushtia-4 is a constituency represented in the Jatiya Sangsad (National Parliament) of Bangladesh since 2026 by Afjal Hossain of the Bangladesh Jamaat-e-Islami.

== Boundaries ==
The constituency encompasses Khoksa and Kumarkhali upazilas.

== History ==
The constituency was created for the first general elections in newly independent Bangladesh, held in 1973.

== Members of Parliament ==
Election	Member	Party
1973	Mohammad Golam Kibria	Awami League
1979	Md. Abdul Haque	Bangladesh Nationalist Party
Major Boundary Changes
1986	Abul Hossain Tarun	Awami League
1988	Nur Alam Ziku	Combined Opposition Party
1991	Abdul Awal Mia	Awami League
Feb 1996	Shahidullah Khan	Bangladesh Nationalist Party
Jun 1996	Syed Mehedi Ahmed Rumi	Bangladesh Nationalist Party
2001	Syed Mehedi Ahmed Rumi	Bangladesh Nationalist Party
2008	Sultana Tarun	Awami League
2014	Abdur Rouf	Awami League
2018	Selim Altaf Gorge	Awami League
2024	Abdur Rouf	Independent
2026	Afjal Hossain	Bangladesh Jamaat-e-Islami

== Elections ==
=== Elections in the 2020s ===
General Election 2026: Kushtia-4
Party	Candidate	Votes	%	±%
Jamaat	Afjal Hossain	148,201	48.9	N/A
BNP	Syed Mehedi Ahmed Rumi	139,603	46.1	N/A
IAB	Anwar Khan	13,739	4.5	N/A
BMJP	Tarun Kumar Ghosh	671	0.2	N/A
Labour	Md. Shahidul Islam	308	0.1	N/A
Gano Forum	Md. Abdul Hakim Mia	255	0.1	N/A
Majority		8,598	2.8	N/A
Turnout		302,777	71.3	N/A
Jamaat gain from AL				

=== Elections in the 2010s ===
General Election 2014: Kushtia-4
Party	Candidate	Votes	%	±%
AL	Abdur Rouf	62,149	50.4	−1.6
Independent	Sadar Uddin Khan	56,475	45.8	N/A
Independent	Rokonuzzaman Rokon	3,550	2.9	N/A
NAP	Abdul Bari Zoarder	1,060	0.9	N/A
Majority		5,674	4.6	−1.6
Turnout		123,234	39.4	−51.7
AL hold				

=== Elections in the 2000s ===
General Election 2008: Kushtia-4
Party	Candidate	Votes	%	±%
AL	Sultana Tarun	131,620	52.0	+20.8
BNP	Syed Mehedi Ahmed Rumi	115,842	45.8	−4.7
JP(E)	Abdul Awal Mia	2,730	1.1	N/A
IAB	Md. Mostafizur Rahman	2,513	1.0	N/A
Zaker Party	Md. Nazmul Ashraf	409	0.2	N/A
Majority		15,778	6.2	−13.1
Turnout		253,114	91.1	+7.2
AL gain from BNP				

General Election 2001: Kushtia-4
Party	Candidate	Votes	%	±%
BNP	Syed Mehedi Ahmed Rumi	110,792	50.5	+17.8
AL	Sultana Tarun	68,404	31.2	−1.3
Independent	Abdur Rouf	36,248	16.5	N/A
JSD	Nur Alam Ziku	3,132	1.4	N/A
CPB	G. M. Shahidul Alam	251	0.1	−0.2
Independent	Sudhir Kumar Das	248	0.1	N/A
Jatiya Party (M)	Md. Solaiman Hossain	173	0.1	N/A
Majority		42,388	19.3	+19.1
Turnout		219,248	83.9	−0.5
BNP hold				

=== Elections in the 1990s ===
General Election June 1996: Kushtia-4
Party	Candidate	Votes	%	±%
BNP	Syed Mehedi Ahmed Rumi	55,871	32.7	+15.2
AL	Abul Hossain Tarun	55,510	32.5	+4.1
Jamaat	Farhad Hossain	26,340	15.4	−8.4
Jatiya Samajtantrik Dal-JSD	Nur Alam Ziku	19,765	11.6	−16.7
JP(E)	Syed Amjad Ali	10,997	6.4	+6.1
IOJ	Ahmed Ali	1,433	0.8	+0.3
CPB	Md. Abul Kasem	551	0.3	N/A
Democratic Republican Party	Md. Shahadat Ali Sheikh	216	0.1	N/A
Jatiya Janata Party (Asad)	Sheikh Jahangir Alam	169	0.1	N/A
Majority		361	0.2	+0.1
Turnout		170,852	84.4	+15.5
BNP gain from AL				

General Election 1991: Kushtia-4
Party	Candidate	Votes	%	±%
AL	Abdul Awal Mia	42,855	28.4	
Jatiya Samajtantrik Dal-JSD	Nur Alam Ziku	42,627	28.3	
Jamaat	Farhad Hossain	35,837	23.8	
BNP	Syed Mehedi Ahmed Rumi	26,408	17.5	
Zaker Party	Md. Alhaz Foyez Uddin	1,299	0.9	
IOJ	Md. Kiam Uddin	727	0.5	
JP(E)	Md. Shahidul Islam	525	0.3	
FP	Mostofa Samsuddin	185	0.1	
Bangladesh Muslim League (Kader)	Amirul Islam	141	0.1	
BAKSAL	A. Mannan Khan	84	0.1	
Majority		228	0.2	
Turnout		150,688	68.9	
AL gain from Jatiya Samajtantrik Dal-JSD				
