= K M Abdul Khaleq Chontu =

Bangladeshi politician

Member of the Bangladesh Parliament
- In office 1991 – February 1996
- Preceded by: Mohammad Badruddoza
- Succeeded by: Sohrab Uddin
- Constituency: Kushtia-3
- In office June 1996 – 2001
- Preceded by: Sohrab Uddin
- Succeeded by: Sohrab Uddin
- Constituency: Kushtia-3

Personal details
- Born: 1 January 1946 Madhupur Village, Kushtia, Nadia District, Bengal Presidency, British India (now Kushtia District, Bangladesh)
- Died: 23 April 2017 (aged 71) National Heart Foundation, Dhaka, Bangladesh
- Party: Bangladesh Nationalist Party

K M Abdul Khaleq Chontu was a Bangladesh Nationalist Party politician and member of parliament for Kushtia-3.

== Career ==
Chontu was elected to parliament from Kushtia-3 as a Bangladesh Nationalist Party candidate in 1991. He died on 23 April 2017 in Dhaka.
