= Bahir Char Union =

[Union Council in Khulna, Bangladesh

Bahir Char Union বাহিরচর ইউনিয়ন
- Union
- Bahir Char Union
- Location within Bangladesh
- Coordinates: 24.0356°N 89.0067°E
- Country: Bangladesh
- Division: Khulna
- District: Kushtia
- Upazila: Bheramara

Area
  - Total: 38.85 km^{2} (15.00 sq mi)

Population (2022)
  - Total: 35,215
  - Density: 906.4/km^{2} (2,348/sq mi)
- Time zone: UTC+6 (BST)
- Website: 3nobahircharup.kushtia.gov.bd/en

Bahir Char Union (Bengali: বাহিরচর ইউনিয়ন) is a union parishad of Bheramara Upazila, in Kushtia District, Khulna Division of Bangladesh. The union has an area of 38.85 square kilometres (15.00 sq mi) and as of 2001 had a population of 24,915. There are 15 villages and 4 mouzas in the union.
