= Shahidullah Khan (politician) =

Bangladeshi politician

- শহীদুল্লাহ খান

Member of Parliament for Kushtia-4
- In office 15 February 1996 – 12 June 1996
- Preceded by: Abdul Awal Mia
- Succeeded by: Syed Mehedi Ahmed Rumi

Personal details
- Born: Kushtia District
- Party: Bangladesh Nationalist Party

Shahidullah Khan is a Bangladesh Nationalist Party politician. He was elected a member of parliament from Kushtia-4 in February 1996.

== Career ==
Khan was elected to parliament from Kushtia-4 as a Bangladesh Nationalist Party candidate in 15 February 1996 Bangladeshi general election.
