= Chandgram Union =

Chandgram Union চাঁদগ্রাম ইউনিয়ন
- Union
- Chandgram Union
- Location within Bangladesh
- Coordinates: 24.0029°N 88.9959°E
- Country: Bangladesh
- Division: Khulna
- District: Kushtia
- Upazila: Bheramara

Area
  - Total: 25.25 km^{2} (9.75 sq mi)

Population (2011)
  - Total: 11,485
  - Density: 454.9/km^{2} (1,178/sq mi)
- Time zone: UTC+6 (BST)
- Website: 4nochandgramup.kushtia.gov.bd

Chandgram Union (Bengali: চাঁদগ্রাম ইউনিয়ন) is a union parishad of Bheramara Upazila, in Kushtia District, Khulna Division of Bangladesh. The union has an area of 25.25 square kilometres (9.75 sq mi) and as of 2001 had a population of 11,485. There are 8 villages and 6 mouzas in the union.
