= Amir Hamza (Mufti) =

Bangladeshi Islamic preacher

Hafiz, Mufti Amir Hamza
- আমির হামজা
- Amir Hamza in 2026

Member of Parliament
- Incumbent
- Assumed office 17 February 2026
- Preceded by: Mahbubul Alam Hanif
- Constituency: Kushtia-3

Personal details
- Born: October 28, 1992 (age 34) Patikabari Union, Kushtia Sadar Upazila, Kushtia District
- Party: Bangladesh Jamaat-e-Islami
- Education: Islamic University, Kushtia
- Occupation: Politician, Da'i

Religious life
- Denomination: Sunni
- Jurisprudence: Hanafi

Amir Hamza (Bengali: আমির হামজা; born 28 October 1992) known as Mufti Amir Hamza is a Bangladeshi Islamic preacher, da'i, and politician who serves as a Member of Parliament representing the Kushtia-3 constituency. He initially gained widespread recognition through his religious lectures at public assemblies, drawing large crowds and substantial online attention. He has been criticized for spreading islamic extremism, conspiracy theories and misogyny in his religious gatherings (Known as Wa’z Mehfils). He is also being investigated for terror links.

== Early life and education ==
Amir Hamza was born on 28 October 1992 in Patikabari Union within the Kushtia Sadar Upazila of the Kushtia District. He completed his higher Islamic studies at the Islamic University, Kushtia.

== Career and controversies ==
Hamza began his public life as an Islamic orator, developing an expansive digital following through recorded sermons shared across social platforms. His lectures occasionally became subjects of intense public discourse. Critics and security agencies frequently raised concerns regarding statements made during his assemblies, alleging the spread of hardline perspectives or misinterpretations of religious texts. (Note: Source:)

In May 2021, Hamza was detained by the Counter Terrorism and Transnational Crime (CTTC) unit in connection with an anti-terrorism investigation over allegations that his speeches influenced individual actors linked to extremist incidents. He was later released on bail. Hamza eventually issued an apology regarding previous inflammatory commentary, stating that the remarks were not premeditated. He continued to manage ongoing legal proceedings, including compliance orders issued by judicial authorities requiring his personal court appearances in early 2026.

== Political career ==
Hamza formalized his political involvement by aligning with Bangladesh Jamaat-e-Islami. He contested the 13th Jatiya Sangsad election as a candidate for the Kushtia-3 constituency. Following his electoral victory, he took his oath of office on 17 February 2026, replacing the outgoing lawmaker Mahbubul Alam Hanif.
