= Abdul Wahed (politician) =

Bangladeshi politician

Member of Bangladesh Parliament
- In office 1986–1988
- Preceded by: Zillur Rahman (politician)
- Succeeded by: Ahsan Habib Lincoln

Personal details
- Party: Bangladesh Jamaat-e-Islami

Abdul Wahed is a Bangladesh Jamaat-e-Islami politician and a former member of parliament for Kushtia-2.

== Career ==
Wahed was elected to parliament from Kushtia-2 as a Bangladesh Jamaat-e-Islami candidate in 1986.
