= Abdulwahid Muhammed Salih =

21st-century Kurd medical researcher and cleric

Prof. Abdulwahid Muhammed Salih
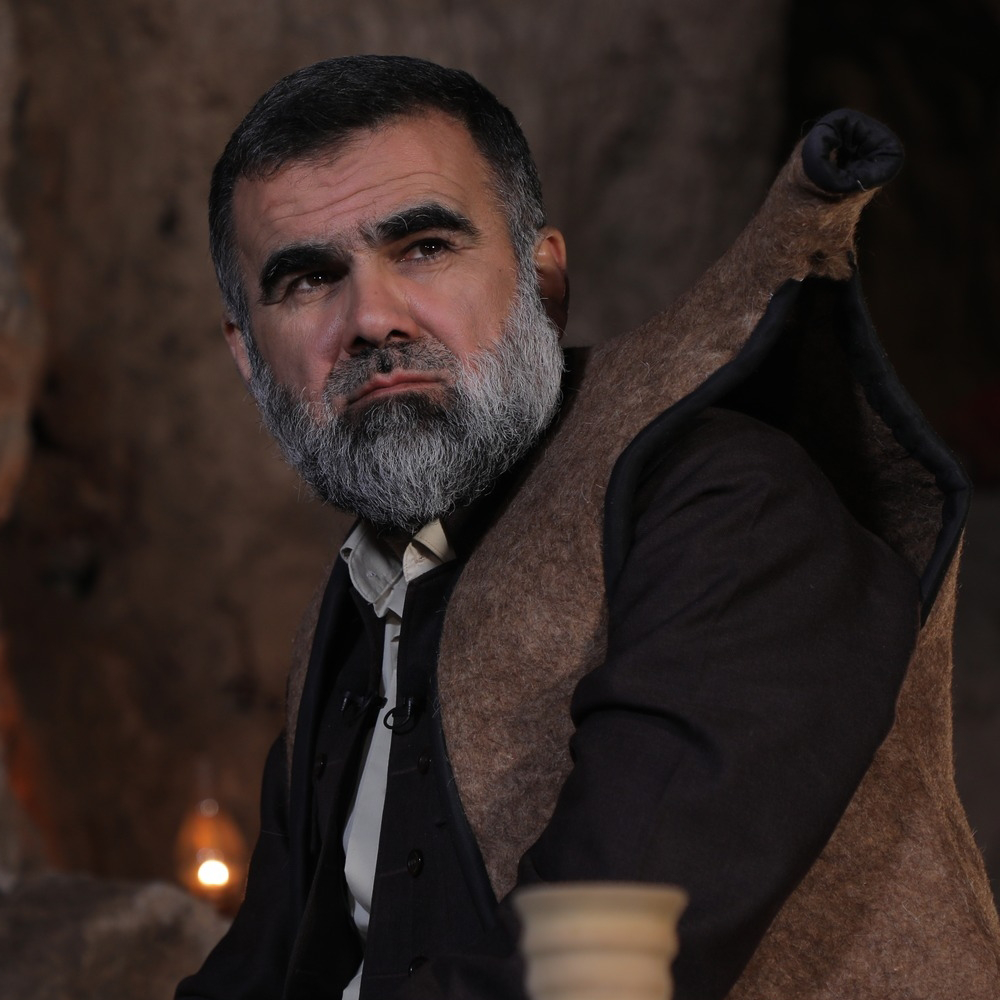

Personal life
- Born: 1 July 1973 (age 53) Sulaymaniyah, Iraq
- Occupation: Orator, surgeon
- Website: https://drabdulwahid.com/

Religious life
- Religion: Islam
- Founder of: Afarin Kids TV, Smart Health Tower, Zad Organization, Astane Organization
- Profession: da'i, researcher, author, and general surgeon

Muslim leader
- Awards: McGowan

Abdulwahid Muhammed Salih (Kurdish: 1 July 1973 : عەبدولواحید محەممەد ساڵح) is a Kurdish academic, researcher, author, Islamic Speaker, and general surgeon. He is the founder of Smart Health Tower. He currently is a professor at the College of Medicine at University of Sulaymaniyah, Iraq.

== Education ==
Dr Abdulwahid completed his primary, secondary, and preparatory stages from Sulaymaniyah governorate in Iraqi Kurdistan. He got top marks in high school and was invited by the Italian Government to study in Italy. However, due to political corruption, he was deprived of the opportunity and someone else was sent instead. He graduated with his bachelor's degree from the College of Medicine at Salahaddin University in 1998. He got his PhD in Medicine at University of Khartoum in 2005 getting a rank of A+ degree.

== Scientific research publishing ==
Abdulwahid has published several research papers in the field of surgery, including a meta-analysis of 453 cases of Porocarcinoma. He also authored a systematic review of the literature on Porocarcinoma. In addition, he has published papers on topics such as COVID-19, anal fissures, pilonidal sinus disease, and retroperitoneal lipoma.

== Medical activities ==
Professor Abdulwahid Muhammed is a general surgeon in thyroid, breast, head, and neck diseases. He holds the (McGowan) Award from the Royal University of Ireland, which is awarded annually to 17 people around the world. He is a Professor at the College of Medicine at University of Sulaymaniyah . He is the founder of Smart Health Tower Surgery Team. He is a member of the Kurdistan Medical Association (KMA), Member of the International Society of Clinical Ulcers (IPS), He is member of the Asian Society of Thyroid Surgery and Member of the Asian Hernia Society.

== Achievements ==
Prof. Abdulwahid is considered to be one of the most successful Thyroid cancer surgeons in Iraq and the Middle East, has performed;

- 2nd Middle East Thyroid Summit in 2026-08-27 & 2026-08-28
- 1st Middle East Thyroid Summit in 2024
- more than 7000 Total thyroidectomy (recurrent goiter, PTC, insular carcinoma ..etc.) surgeries.
- more than 1700 Breast surgeries.
- more than 1700 Papillary thyroid carcinoma (PTC) surgeries.
- more than 2000 thyroid-lobectomy surgeries.
- more than 450 Parotid surgeries.
- more than 900 Neck dissection surgeries.
- more than 350 Recurrent Goiter surgeries.
- more than 300 Sistrunk Goiter surgeries.
- more than 200 Thyroglossal cyst surgeries.
- more than 200 parathyroid surgeries.

== Preaching and calling for Islam ==
He has been a preacher of Islam since 1992 and has dozens of lectures, books, conferences, and speeches on the preaching and different fields of Islam, Among the most important areas he has worked on are Comparative religion, answering doubts about Islam, Aqidah, Islamic view of miracles, and Tazkiyah. His most important lectures of preaching include:

- Series of (Proofs of Muhammad’s Prophethood)
- Series of (The Diet of the Prophet Muhammad)
- The miracle of embryonic
- The Heart Series
- Series (Islamic Beliefs)
- Series (The stories of the Quran)
- Series of (afala tubsirun – Don't You See?)
- Series ( Residential Projects)
