= Mokarimpur Union =

Mokarimpur Union মোকারিমপুরইউনিয়ন
- Union
- Bahadurpur Union
- Location within Bangladesh
- Coordinates: 24.0461°N 88.9881°E
- Country: Bangladesh
- Division: Khulna
- District: Kushtia
- Upazila: Bheramara

Area
  - Total: 83.58 km^{2} (32.27 sq mi)

Population (2011)
  - Total: 32,435
  - Density: 388.1/km^{2} (1,005/sq mi)
- Time zone: UTC+6 (BST)
- Website: 2nomukarimpurup.kushtia.gov.bd

Mokarimpur Union (Bengali: মোকারিমপুর ইউনিয়ন) is a union parishad of Bheramara Upazila, in Kushtia District, Khulna Division of Bangladesh. The union has an area of 83.58 square kilometres (32.27 sq mi) and as of 2001 had a population of 32,435. There are 13 villages and 10 mouzas in the union.
