= Abdul Wahid (politician) =

Indonesian politician (1960–2024)

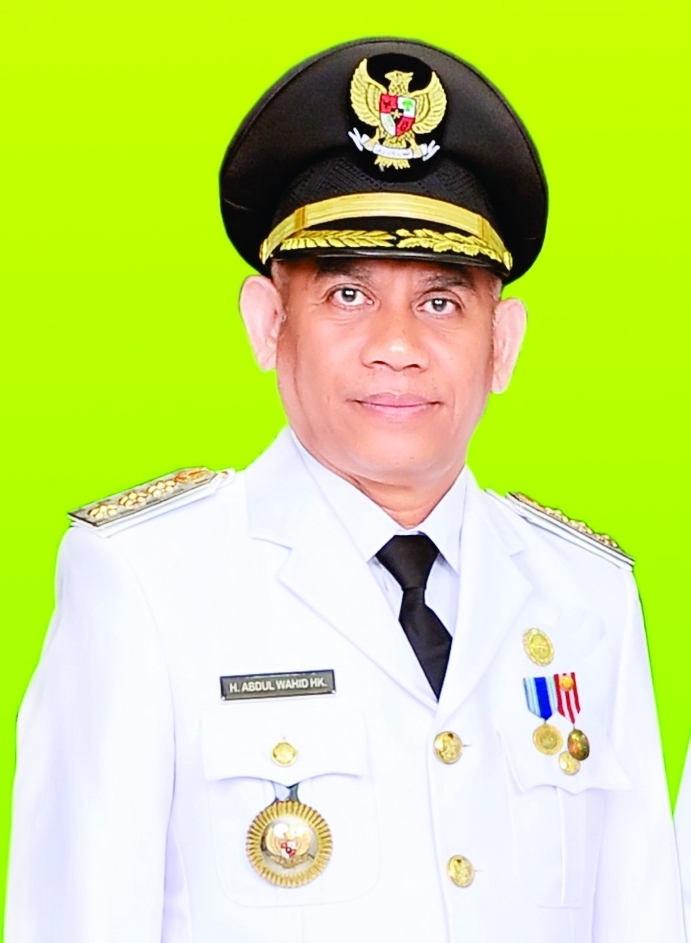

Regent of North Hulu Sungai
- In office 9 October 2012 – 18 November 2021
- Lieutenant: Husairi Abdi
- Preceded by: M. Aunul Hadi Idham Chalid
- Succeeded by: Husairi Abdi (acting)

Personal details
- Born: 27 February 1960 Amuntai, South Kalimantan, Indonesia
- Died: 6 June 2024 (aged 64) Banjarmasin, South Kalimantan, Indonesia
- Party: Golkar
- Spouse: Anisah Rasyidah
- Children: 2
- Education: IAIN Antasari; Narotama University; Brawijaya University

Drs. H. Abdul Wahid HK, M.M., M.Si (27 February 1960 – 6 June 2024) was an Indonesian Golkar politician who became Regent of North Hulu Sungai for two terms from 2012 to 2021. He served as the Regent of North Hulu Sungai together with his deputy, Husairi Abdi.

== Biography ==
=== Early life and education ===
Abdul Wahid was born in Amuntai on 27 February 1960 as the child of H. Abdul Karim dan Hj. Mastika Aini. He had four siblings who were Hj. Ismawati, H. Muhammad Taufik, Farid Wajidi, and Abdul Basith.

Abdul Wahid studied at State Elementary School Tunas Harapan Elementary in Amuntai (1967–1973), Madrasah Tsanawiyah Normal Islam Amuntai for Boys (1973–1980). He then pursued his education at Four Years Amuntai State Religious Teacher Education School (PGAN) (1974–1978) and Six Years Amuntai PGAN (1978–1980). He continued his higher education at the Faculty of Tarbiyah of State Islamic Institute Antasari in Banjarmasin in 1981 and graduated in 1988 by earning a Doctorandus title. Subsequently, he took postgraduate education at Narotama University, Surabaya, in 1999 and earned a Master's in Management in 2002. Moreover, he also pursued postgraduate education in state administration at the Brawijaya University in 2000 and obtained a Master of Science degree in 2003.

=== Career ===
From when he was in college, Abdul Wahid worked as a journalist for Banjarmasin Post for 17 years, from 1982 to 1999. In the 1999 election, he was elected as a North Hulu Sungai Regional House of Representatives (DPRD) member. He won a seat again during the 2004 election and was appointed the North Hulu Sungai Regional House of Representatives speaker. In the 2009 election, he was reelected and became the Deputy Speaker of the North Hulu Sungai Regional House of Representatives.

During the 2012 North Hulu Sungai Regencial Election, paired with Husairi Abdi, Abdul Wahid won the votes. They were inaugurated as regent and vice-regent on 9 October 2012.

Abdul Wahid paired with Husairi Abdi again during the 2017 North Hulu Sungai Regencial Election and they were reelected again. They were inaugurated on 9 October 2017.

== Organization ==
Abdul Wahid had been involved in the organization since his school year. He became the Deputy Chairman of the Amuntai Branch Leadership of the Nahdlatul Ulama Student Association and Deputy Chairman of Nahdlatul Muta'allimin Normal Islam Rasyidiyah Khalidiyah from 1977 to 1979.

During his college year, he served as the Commandant of the 1st Battalion (Dan Yon 1) Student Regiment South Kalimantan Suryanata, the Head of Student Affairs for the Student Senate of the Faculty of Tarbiyah at IAIN Antasari Banjarmasin, and the Head of Cadre Formation for the Branch Leadership of the Indonesian Islamic Student Movement (PC PMII) Banjarmasin from 1981 to 1984. Afterwards, he served as the Deputy Chairman of the Coordinating Branch Management (PKC) PMII South Kalimantan from 1984 to 1987.

As a journalist, he was a member of South Kalimantan's Indonesian Journalists Association from 1983 to 1999. Furthermore, he also became a member of South Kalimantan Golkar's Mass Media (1985–1992) and Head of Mass Media of North Hulu Sungai from 1992 to 1998.

As a politician, he served as the Deputy Chairman of the Regional Leadership Council (DPD) of the Golkar Party in North Hulu Sungai from 1999 to 2009. He also served as the chairman of Kosgoro 1957 in North Hulu Sungai. He served as the Deputy Chairman of the DPD of the Golkar Party in South Kalimantan from 2009 to 2012 and the Chairman of the DPD of the Golkar Party in North Hulu Sungai.

== Personal life ==
Abdul Wahid married Dra. Hj. Anisah Rasyidah, M.AP. and she works as a civil servant. Anisah served as the Head of the Population Control and Family Planning Agency (DPPKB) of North Hulu Sungai Regency since 2018 (acting since 2016). The couple had two sons: Indrarta Fajar Nuzuli and Almien Ashar Safari. Almien serves as the Chairman of the Regional House of Representatives (DPRD) of North Hulu Sungai Regency for the 2019–2024 term.

Abdul Wahid died at the Dr. R. Soeharsono Hospital in Banjarmasin, on 6 June 2024, at the age of 64.

== Law case ==
On 18 November 2021, the Corruption Eradication Commission arrested Abdul Wahid and named a suspect for bribery and gratuities in procuring goods and services in North Hulu Sungai Regency, South Kalimantan, during 2021–2022. For his actions, Abdul Wahid was sentenced to nine years in prison.
