= Abdel Wahed Ben Siamar Mimun =

Moroccan basketball player

Personal information
- Nationality: Moroccan
- Born: 1941 (age 83–84); Nador, Morocco

Sport
- Sport: Basketball

Abdel Wahed Ben Siamar Mimun (born 1941) is a Moroccan basketball player. He competed in the men's tournament at the 1968 Summer Olympics.
