= Ali bin Abdulwahed Al-Sijelmasi =

Moroccan Maliki jurist, writer, physician and linguist

- Born: c. 1594
- Died: c. 1647
- Occupations: Jurist, scholar, physician, linguist

Ali bin Abdulwahed Al-Sijelmasi (Arabic: علي بن عبدالواحد السجلماسي), born in Tafilat around 1594 and died in 1647 AD in Algeria, was a Moroccan Maliki jurist, writer, physician and linguist.

== His life ==
He was Abu Al-Hasan Ali bin Abdulwahed bin Mohammad bin Siraj Al-Sijelmasi Al-Jaza’iri Al-Ansari. He was born in 1594 in Tafilat to a family belonging to the companion Saad bin Ubadah, and he grew up in Sijelmasa. He studied in Fez at the hands of Afif Al-Din Abdullah bin Ali bin Taher Al-Hasani, Muhammad bin Abi Bakr Al-Dula'i and Shihab Al-Maqri. He performed Hajj and entered Egypt in 1634 AD and learned from its scholars in that period, such as Sheikh Ahmed Al-Ghunaimi, Sheikh Ahmed bin Abdulwarith Al-Bakri, Al-Nour Al-Ajhouri and others. He returned to Morocco and settled in Fez and became a mufti in Al-Jabal Al-Akhdar. He died of plague in Algeria in 1647.

== Works ==
He had many books, most of them were written as poetry (composition) in various fields, some of which are in Tafsir (Arabic title: Wa Laken Albr Man Etaqa), the Prophet’s biography (Arabic title: Al-Durra Al-Munifa) and jurisprudence ( Arabic title: Al-Yawaqit Al-Thamina Fi Al-Aqaed wa Al-Ashbah wa Al-Nathaer fi Feqh Alem Al-Madina, Jame'atu Al-Asrar, and Masalek Al-Wusool fi Madarek Al-Usool), and a composition in (Arabic: Wafeyyat Al-Aayan), and others in grammar, morphology, semantics and Tafsir, arguing and logic, medicine, anatomy and others.

=== Published books ===
- (Arabic title: Menhatu Al-Qayyum on the Introduction of Ibn Ajrum: Explanation of Al-Ajrumiyah in Grammar), Dar Ibn Hazm, Beirut, 2018, ISBN 9789959857194.
- (Arabic title: Sharh Al-Sijelmasi on the Completion of the Curriculum, West African Manuscripts.

=== Books about him ===
- (Arabic title: Kamal Bel Harka, Allama Abul-Hassan Ali bin Abdulwahed Al-Ansari Al-Sijelmasi Al-Salawi Al-Jazaeri) (d. 1070), His Life and Traditions, Dar Al-Irfan for Publishing and Distribution, 2020, Agadir, Morocco
- (Arabic title: Kamal BelHarka, Sharh Yawaqit AlMadina fima Entama le Alem Al-madina: From the Rules and from the Singularities of Analogies with Benefits), for the scholar Sidi Mohammad bin Abi Al-Qasim Al-Sijelmasi Al-Baja’di Al-Rebati, study and investigation, Dar Ibn Hazm, Beirut, 2015, ISBN 978-9959-85513-8.
