= Mohammad Golam Kibria =

Bangladeshi politician

- মোহাম্মদ গোলাম কিবরিয়া

Member of Bangladesh Parliament

Member of Parliament for Kushtia-4
- In office 1973–1974
- Succeeded by: Md. Abdul Haque

Personal details
- Died: 25 December 1974
- Party: Bangladesh Awami League
- Education: Pabna Edward College

Mohammad Golam Kibria (died 25 December 1974) was a Bangladesh Awami League politician and a member of parliament for Kushtia-4. His son, Abul Hossain Tarun, was elected to parliament from Kushtia-4.

== Career ==
Kibria was a founding member of Awami League. He was elected to parliament from Kushtia-4 as a Bangladesh Awami League candidate in 1973.

== Death ==
Kibria was assassinated on 25 December 1974.
