= Bahadurpur Union, Bheramara =

Bahadurpur Union বাহাদুরপুর ইউনিয়ন
- Union
- Bahadurpur Union
- Location within Bangladesh
- Coordinates: 24.1032°N 88.9638°E
- Country: Bangladesh
- Division: Khulna
- District: Kushtia
- Upazila: Bheramara

Area
  - Total: 38.85 km^{2} (15.00 sq mi)

Population (2011)
  - Total: 28,794
  - Density: 741.2/km^{2} (1,920/sq mi)
- Time zone: UTC+6 (BST)
- Website: 1nobahadurpurup.kushtia.gov.bd

Bahadurpur Union (Bengali: বাহাদুরপুর ইউনিয়ন) is a union parishad situated at Bheramara Upazila, in Kushtia District, Khulna Division of Bangladesh. The union has an area of 38.85 square kilometres (15.00 sq mi) and as of 2001 had a population of 28,794. There are 15 villages and 4 mouzas in the union.
