= Sohrab Uddin =

Bangladeshi politician

- সোহরাব উদ্দিন

Member of the Bangladesh Parliament
- In office February 1996 – June 1996
- Preceded by: Abdul Khaleq Chantu
- Succeeded by: Abdul Khaleq Chantu
- Constituency: Kushtia-3
- In office 28 October 2001 – 27 October 2006
- Preceded by: Abdul Khaleq Chantu
- Succeeded by: Khandaker Rashiduzzaman
- Constituency: Kushtia-3

Personal details
- Born: 12 February 1953 (age 73) Kushtia Sadar Upazila, Kushtia, East Pakistan
- Party: Bangladesh Nationalist Party
- Education: Islamic University, Bangladesh

Sohrab Uddin is a Bangladesh Nationalist Party politician and a former member of parliament from Kushtia-3.

== Career ==
Uddin was elected as a Member of Parliament in 1996 February election and 2001 election from Kushtia-3 as a candidate of Bangladesh Nationalist Party. He is the organising secretary of Kushtia District unit of Bangladesh Nationalist Party. He is the president of Jatiyatabadi Muktijoddha Dal. Uddin was sued for corruption on 23 September 2007 in Kushtia. His home was attacked in March 2009 by unknown individuals.
