= Abdulwahid AlAbduljabbar =

Abdulwahid Ahmad Hassan AlAbduljabbar (Arabic: عبدالواحد احمد حسن العبدالجبار) was a Saudi political activist. Born in 1935 in Qatif, he died on June 15, 1970, of torture by Saudi authorities in the garden of the prison in Jeddah. He had been arrested on June 4, 1970, with Abdulwahid Faraj AlOmran. Both were murdered on the night of June 15, 1970, and both buried in a ditch in the prison's garden. The charge against him by the Saudi-Pakistani colonel was of if there was any relations to, and whether the failed coup was a front for George Habash, Nayef Hawatmeh, Mohsen Ibrahim, Nasser AlSaeed and the Union of the People of the Arabian Peninsula, all Socialist personalities and organizations. The annual report of the International Committee for the Defense of Human Rights in the Gulf and the Arabian Peninsula in 1989 mentioned him getting arrested and after 11 days of torture he died of severe hemorrhage leaving behind a wife and one son named Khalid.

== See also ==
- Freedom of religion in Saudi Arabia
