= Abdulvohid Burhonov =

One of the founders of the Jadid movement

Mirzo Abdulvohid Burhonov
- Born: 1875; Bukhara, Uzbekistan
- Died: 1934 (aged 58–59); Dushanbe, Tajikistan
- Occupation: pedagogue
- Years active: 1908–1934

Abdulvohid Burhonov (pen name Munzim; Mirzo Abdulvohid Munzim) was one of the founders of the Jadid movement and the Young Bukharans organization in Bukhara.

== Early life and education ==
He was born in Bukhara in 1875, and despite the family wealth, he lived a modest life in one of the rooms of the Muhammad Sharif madrasa in the city. Mirzo Abdulvohid spent all the income he inherited from his father for educational purposes.

He received his primary education in an old school.

== Career ==
From the 1890s, he started writing poems under the pen name Munzim, and later engaged in educational activities. In the early 20th century, Abdulvohid Burhonov began to strive for opening a new-method school. The opening of the first Jadid school in Bukhara was also related to his name. He went to Samarkand and learned the experience of teaching in new-method schools from Mahmud Khoja Behbudi and Abduqodir Shukuri. His handwriting was very elegant, and no Bukharan Mirzo could match him in the art of calligraphy.

From October 1908, he opened a new-method Jadid school in his house in Bukhara, and in 1909, he also established a night school for older students. Mirzo Abdulvohid demonstrated the advantages of the new school by inviting parents, religious leaders and officials to his private school and conducting a demonstrative exam for the children. A group led by Mulla Ikrom, one of the muftis of Bukhara, highly praised the activities of the new school and recommended to expand their network and even to transfer the madrasa education to this method. Mirzo Abdulvohid, together with Mukammil Burhonov and Sadriddin Ayni, participated in the establishment of the secret society “Tarbiyai atfol” (“Children’s Education”) in Bukhara. The society promoted progressive democratic ideas among Bukharan intellectuals and activists and fought for the political awakening of the people.

After the February Revolution of 1917, the Bukharan Jadids were divided into two groups: the old Jadids led by Abdulvohid Burhonov and the new Jadids led by Fayzulla Khojayev and Abdurauf Fitrat. The main activity of the first group, which acted as conservatives, was education, while the second group was in favor of wide reforms. Later, as a result of the unification of these two groups, the “Young Bukharans” party was formed, and Munzim was appointed as the leader of the party. From 1918 to September 1920, Munzim lived in Tashkent. After the establishment of the People’s Republic of Bukhara, he became the deputy chairman of the PRB Central Executive Committee, the minister of public education, and the minister of health (1920–1924). As the minister of public education, Abdulvohid Burhonov made a great contribution to the adoption of the PRB government’s decision to send a group of Bukharan youths to Germany for the purpose of training local specialists, especially engineers, in June 1922. Based on this decision, he was appointed as the chairman of the commission for organizing the education abroad. In the summer of 1922, he personally took 44 Bukharan students to Germany and placed them in educational institutions in Berlin. In the 1920s, he was engaged in scientific and journalistic activities. In the early 1930s, he worked for the “Tojikistoni surx” (“Red Tajikistan”) newspaper. Abdulvohid Burhonov died of a serious illness in Dushanbe in 1934.

== Personal life ==
Abduvohid Munzim had three sons. His youngest son (about 5 years old) died tragically by drowning in water. His two elder sons studied in schools and universities in Germany and Russia (St. Petersburg and Moscow). One of his grandsons, Burxonov Olim Raximovich, worked at the Academy of Sciences of Tajikistan and was involved in scientific research, as well as taught philosophy at the university.

He died in Dushanbe in 1934.
