= Abdul Wahed Bokainagari =

Bangladeshi politician (1876–1968)

Moulvi Abdul Wahed Bokainagari
- আব্দুল ওয়াহেদ বোকাইনগরী

Member of the East Bengal Legislative Assembly
- In office 14 August 1947 – 29 May 1954

Member of the Bengal Legislative Assembly
- In office 1937–1947
- Constituency: Mymensingh East

Personal details
- Born: c. 1876 Netrokona, Mymensingh district, Bengal Presidency
- Died: 17 November 1968 (aged 91–92) East Pakistan
- Party: Nizam-e-Islam Party; Krishak Praja Party; Indian National Congress

Abdul Wahed Bokainagari (Bengali: আব্দুল ওয়াহেদ বোকাইনগরী; 1876–1968) was a Bengali politician.

== Early life ==
Abdul Wahed was born in c. 1876 to Muhammad Taqi Husayn and Begum Mehrunnesa in Joyshidh, Netrokona, which was then a part of the Mymensingh district of the Bengal Presidency. He was from Fort Bokainagar. Bokainagari completed his education at the local school and madrasa.

== Career ==
Bokainagari entered politics in 1905, initially affiliating with the Congress party and later with the Krishak Praja Party founded by A. K. Fazlul Huq. He participated in the Khilafat Movement. Bokainagari was elected to the Bengal Legislative Assembly as a Krishak Praja Party politician for Mymensingh East constituency at the 1937 elections. Bokainagari was re-elected for a second term following the 1946 elections. Speeches in Bengali language were forbidden in the assembly. When Bokainagari started to speak in Bengali in the session, the Speaker kept forbidding him to speak in Bengali. Ignoring that, he gave the entire speech in Bengali. He advocated for the right to deliver speeches in Bengali in the Bengal Legislative Assembly.

After the Partition of Bengal in 1947, he transferred to the East Bengal Legislative Assembly. He was re-elected at the 1954 East Bengal Legislative Assembly election as a Nizam-e-Islam Party politician.

He was elected as the chairman of Gouripur Municipality in 1949, and led the Bengali language movement in Gouripur. Bokainagari played a leading role in the establishment of the Gouripur Girls High School and College. He was the founding president of the Gouripur College's first governing board.

== Personal life ==
Bokainagari married in 1917 and had four sons and five daughters.

== Death ==
Bokainagari died on 17 November 1968.
