= Abdulwahid Rigi =

Iranian Sunni Muslim cleric

Molavi Abdulwahid Rigi

Personal life
- Born: Abdulwahid
- Died: December 8, 2022

Religious life
- Religion: Islam
- Denomination: Sunni

Maulvi Abdulwahid Rigi, was an Iranian Sunni Muslim cleric of Sistan and Baluchistan Province and the Friday prayer Imam of Imam Hossein Mosque of the city of Khash, who was kidnapped and killed on Thursday, December 8, 2022.

== Kidnapping and murder ==
According to the General and Revolutionary Prosecutor of Sistan and Baluchistan province, on Thursday Rigi was present at his mosque, but unknown individuals called him from the rear door, making him sit on the back seat of a car that did not have a license plate. After kidnapping Maulvi Abdulwahid, the defendants killed him. His body was discovered and identified in one of the side roads of Khash city with 3 bullets shot in his head. According to sources affiliated with the Islamic Republic of Iran, this murder was carried out by "foreign Baloch separatist currents".

=== Before the incident ===
Less than a month before being kidnapped and killed, Maulvi Abdulwahid Rigi, on November 14, 2022, at the "Consolidation of Unity and Empathy" conference held in Zahedan city, had a meeting with a three-member delegation sent to Sistan and Balochistan by the Supreme Leader of Iran Seyyed Ali Khamenei. The publication of his words in this meeting caused many media to speculate about his murder. Maulvi Abdulwahid Rigi emphasized in this conversation:

"I was on the front line during the eight years of Holy Defense, and we have always been on the scene during the revolution, including during all the country's elections, and this is our honor. During the recent chaos in Khash, I said that no one has the right to leave the mosque because we knew that the hypocrites were outside and we knew what they were doing. We have nothing to say other than Islam, Islamic system, Iran and brotherhood with Shia. You have to read history to understand how close we Sunnis of Sistan and Baluchistan have been with our Shia brothers. I have even been threatened by hostile groups; But these have no effect. We love you Shia brothers for God's sake. We love this country, the leadership is our friend."

=== Arresting the killers ===
Iran's Ministry of Intelligence declared on Tuesday, December 22, in an announcement, that three of the main agents of the assassination of Maulvi Abdulvahid Rigi, who were planning to flee the country, were identified and arrested.

== Funeral ==
The commemoration ceremony of Maulvi AbdulWahid was held in Khash with the presence of some city and provincial officials and was transferred to his hometown in Neron village in Taftan County for burial.

== Reactions to murder ==
The leader of Iran, the president of Iran, the head of the judiciary, the representative of the Supreme Leader in Sistan and Baluchistan province and Friday imam of Zahedan, and Sunni Friday imam of Inche Broun were among the people who expressed their condolences on the death of Maulvi Abdulwahid Rigi in separate messages and emphasized on the pursuit and identification of the perpetrators of the murder.
