= Abdul Wahid Nazari =

- Born: February 25, 1953 (age 72); Kandahar, Afghanistan
- Occupation(s): film director, screenwriter and film producer

Abdul Wahid Nazari (Pashto: عبدالواحد نظري) is an Afghan film writer, director and producer. He is the director of Radio Television Afghanistan.

== Early life ==
Abdul Wahid was born to Mohammad Amin Nazari in 1954 in Kandahar, Afghanistan. He completed his high school from Rahman Baba High School in Kabul.

Abdul Wahid was admitted to the Faculty of Law and Political Science at Kabul University. A year later he received a scholarship to Bulgaria where he studied Cinema and Television. In 1982 he completed his PhD and returned to Afghanistan.

Soon after returning to Afghanistan in 1982, he started working as a TV director and then a movie director. In the meantime, he was appointed as the director of Afghan films and a professor at the Faculty of Arts in Kabul University.

In 2005 he was appointed as the head of Ariana Television and later the head of Shamshad Television.

== Works ==
=== Films or movies ===
- Staso pa Hewad kay magar khar nasta
- Dray Shpay De Yaw Zarawar Yaway Shpay Sakha
- parwareshgah Watan (1983)
- Lahza Ha (1984)
- Armaan (1988)
- Ka Ghoshchey (1988)
- De Lmar Pa Lor (1992)
- Afghanistan Bay La Shor Wayano Sakha, Documentary (1990)
- De Konday Zoy (1991)
- Gumrah (2002)
- Hijrat (2004)

=== Comic publications ===
- Agar Nadidey Bawar Kun (1997)
- Gula Rasa Ka Yay Goray (1997)
- Wah Wah Guli Sib (1997)
- Kala War De Aba Aw Kala (2002)
- Deega Chotor Hastey (2002)
- Akhir Ba Yay Sanga See? (2003)
- yak ba dunia sad Ba akherat (2003)
- History of Afghan cinema (2011)
- Chel wazir be aqal (2013)
