= Abdelwahid Bouabdallah =

Algerian businessperson

Air Algérie, Chairman and CEO
- In office March 1, 2008 – parliamentarian APN

Personal details
- Born: 18 July 1953 (age 72)

Abdelwahid Bouabdallah (Arabic: عبد الواحد بو عبد الله) (born 18 July 1953) was the CEO of Air Algérie from March 2008 to June 2011.

Born in 1953 and the father of four children, Abdelwahid Bouabdallah holds a degree in mathematics from the University of Algiers in 1973. He subsequently achieved a computer science diploma in engineering that enabled him to integrate the Ministry of Water in 1978. He then advised the Caisse Nationale d'Epargne et de Prévoyance (CNEP), before being appointed to the position of CEO of the same bank from 1991 to 1993. From 1993 to 1994, his served as an adviser to the head of government before joining the Agence Nationale d'Edition et de Publicité (ANEP) in 1995 as CEO. Three years later, in 1998, he took the reins of the group COSIDER as CEO, assuming this responsibility until 2002, when he was elected MP for the region FLN in Algiers, President of the economic commission.

On March 1, 2008 he was appointed the CEO of Air Algérie replacing former CEO Mohamed Tayeb Benouis who died in August, 2007. Bouabdallah served in the position until 19 June 2011.
