= Abdulwahed Al-Awadhi =

Kuwaiti politician (born 1955)

Abdulwahed Al-Awadhi (born 1955) is a Kuwaiti politician. He was a member of the Kuwaiti National Assembly, representing the first district.

== Early life and education ==
Born in 1955, Al-Awadhi studied Aviation at the US Marine Academy. Afterwards, he served in the Kuwaiti Air Force and fought in Kuwait's Liberation War against Saddam Hussein in 1991.

== Career ==
Elected to the National Assembly in 2003, 2006, and 2008. Al-Awadhi is considered to an Independent member with liberal-leaning views.

Al-Awadhi was appointed as a Minister of Housing, Minister of Communications, and Acting Minister of State for Affairs of the National Assembly in his 2008 term as the representative of Elected Parliament Members in the Government.

== Opposed redistricting ==
In 2004, there was a push by the Kuwaiti (Lolowa abdulaziz saleh al abdulwahed )parliament to reorganized Kuwait's voting districts. At the time, each of Kuwait's twenty-five districts had only about 10,000 voters. The plan was to cut down on vote-buying by reorganizing Kuwait into five districts with about 50,000 voters each. Although the redistricting reforms eventually went through, the Emir initially opposed them. At that time, Al-Awadhi stood with the Emir and against the majority in parliament, saying "I don't believe reducing the number will eliminate electoral malpractices such as vote buying and bribery. These violations should be dealt with using other effective methods rather than reducing the number of constituencies".

== Kuwait Airways investigation ==
On 9 September 2007, Kuwait Airways' board of directors, headed by ruling family member Sheikh Talal Mubarak al-Sabah, resigned following differences with the government over a multi-billion-dollar deal to buy new aircraft. In July, Al-Awadhi had accused the corporation of squandering public funds and led the parliament to approve a recommendation by a three-MP inquiry committee, which called for top airline executives to be referred to the public prosecutor over alleged financial and administrative irregularities.
