= Abdul Waheed Khan (UNESCO official) =

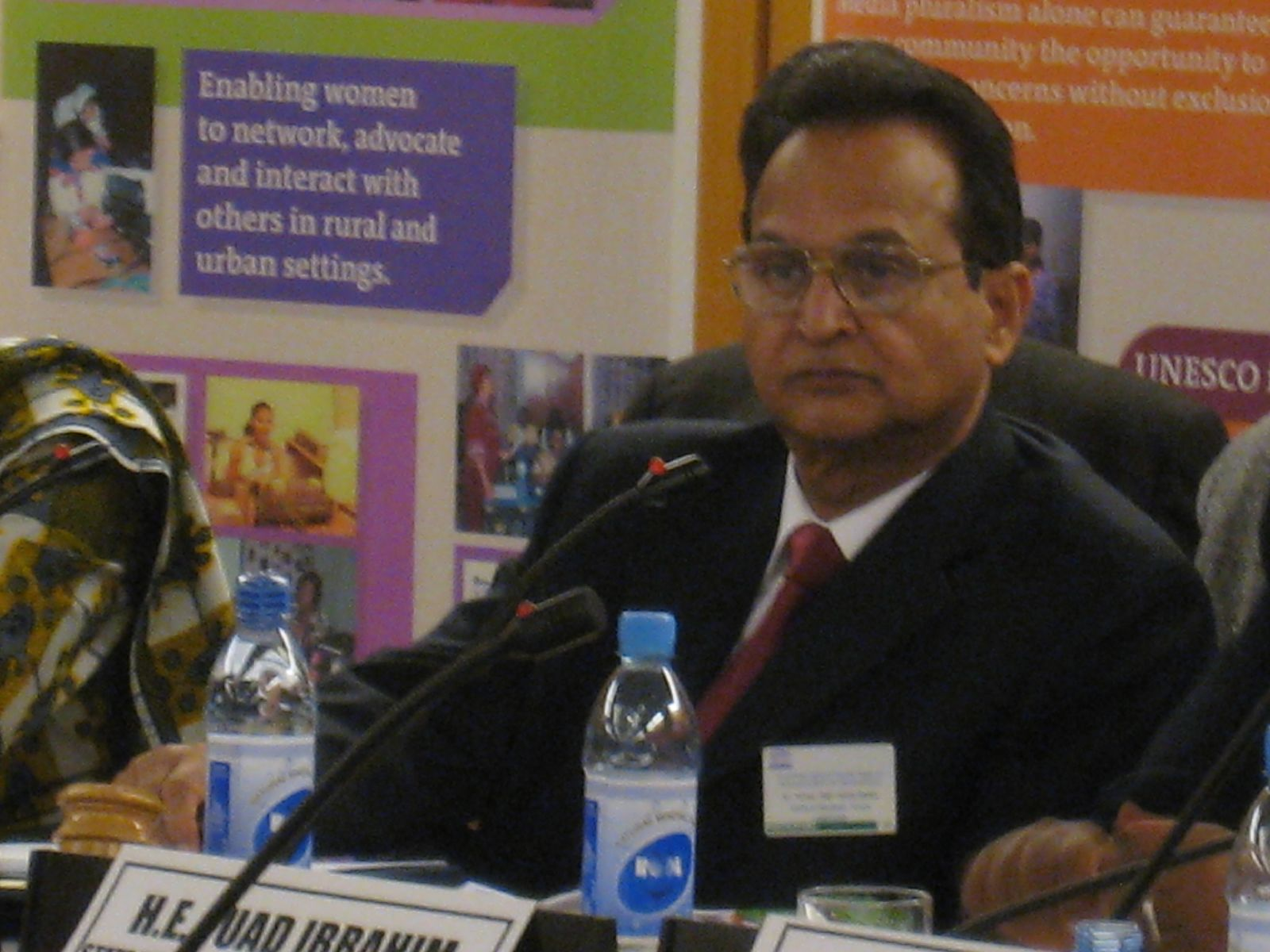
Abdul Waheed Khan at the 10th UN Inter-Agency Round Table on Communications for Development

Abdul Waheed Khan (born 1947) was the Assistant Director-General for Communication and Information of United Nations Educational, Scientific and Cultural Organization (UNESCO), a role he has held from 2001 to 2010. He was President of a start-up business university in Manama, Bahrain until March 2013.

Dr Abdul Waheed Khan is currently retired and spends his time between India, his native land and Canada, the country where he chose to settle down after leaving Bahrain.

== Education ==
Khan attended Agra University in India, earning a master's degree in agricultural extension in 1965, before relocating to the University of Wisconsin in Madison, Wisconsin. There, he earned a second master's degree in agricultural journalism in 1970 before earning his Doctor of Philosophy in mass communication in 1973. He was born in Agya (Sant kabir Nagar).

== Early career ==
Prior to joining the United Nations, Khan was affiliated with the Indira Gandhi National Open University (IGNOU) in New Delhi, India and Commonwealth of Learning in Canada. Founding director of the former, Khan was also Professor of its Communications Division until 1992. In his last year in that capacity, he simultaneously acted as a visiting professor at the National Institute of Multimedia Education in Chiba, Japan. He began working at Commonwealth of Learning as Senior Programme Officer in 1992. In 1995, he spent a year as Acting Head of the Communications and Information Technologies Division before transition into the Principal Communications Specialist, a role he retained until 1998. In 1998, he returned to IGNOU as President and Chief Executive Officer (Vice-Chancellor). He remained there until 2000, when he spent a year as Director of Training and Development at Commonwealth of Learning. In 2001, he accepted the appointment to UNESCO.

== University of the People ==
Abdul Waheed Khan is a member of the Council of Presidents for the University of the People. His experience in the field of education has helped establish the first non-profit, tuition-free, online academic institution that seeks to revolutionize higher education by making college-level studies accessible to students worldwide.
