= Syed Mehedi Ahmed Rumi =

Bangladeshi politician

Syed Mehdi Ahmed Roomy
- সৈয়দ মেহেদী আহমেদ রুমী

Member of the Bangladesh Parliament for Kushtia-4
- In office 1996–2006
- Preceded by: Shahidullah Khan
- Succeeded by: Sultana Tarun

Personal details
- Party: Bangladesh Nationalist Party

Syed Mehdi Ahmed Roomy is a Bangladesh Nationalist Party politician and a former member of parliament for Kushtia-4.

== Career ==
Roomy was elected to parliament member from Kushtia-4 as 1996 and 2001.Bangladesh Nationalist Party has been giving him nomination in 1991,1996 ,2001,2008 and 2018. He is an adviser to former prime minister and chairperson of the Bangladesh Nationalist Party, Khaleda Zia. He is the president of the Kushtia District unit of the Bangladesh Nationalist Party. He was the founder president of kushtia district Jubo Dal. His father name is Syed Masud Roomy. He was also for my member of parliament of 78-kushtia -4 in 1979.
