= Syed Altaf Hossain =

Bangladeshi politician

- সৈয়দ আলতাফ হোসেন

Minister of Railways

Personal details
- Born: 16 March 1923 Kushtia, Nadia district, Bengal Presidency
- Died: 12 November 1992 (aged 69) Dhaka, Bangladesh
- Party: National Awami Party

Syed Altaf Hossain (Bengali: সৈয়দ আলতাফ হোসেন; 16 March 1923 – 12 November 1992) was a Bangladeshi politician who was a member of Parliament and Minister of Railway.

== Early life ==
Hossain was born on 16 March 1923 to a Bengali Muslim family claiming to be Syeds in Vishnudia, Kushtia, Nadia district, Bengal Presidency. His father was Syed Yad Ali and his mother was Jarina Khatun. He graduated from Hari Narayanpur School in 1939. In 1940 he joined the movement to remove Howel Monument from Kolkata led by Subhas Chandra Bose. He finished in Bachelor of Arts from Islamia College in 1944. He finished his law degree and Masters in History from Kolkata University in 1947.

== Career ==
From 1944 Hossain worked in the news section of the Morning News in Kolkata. He moved to Dhaka, East Pakistan, after the partition of India. From 1949 he started to work in the Pakistan Observer (today Bangladesh Observer). He also worked at the Daily Ittehad. From 1950 to 1953 he worked in the Morning News in Dhaka. In 1954 he was elected to the East Bengal Provincial Assembly from the United Front. In 1955 he was arrested after Martial law was declared in Pakistan. In 1956 he was the editor of the New Nation.

In 1957 he was elected to Central and Provincial executive committee of National Awami Party of Abdul Hamid Khan Bhashani. In 1965 he was elected general secretary of the National Awami Party. He joined the pro-Moscow group of the NAP after it split into two camps, pro-China and Pro-Moscow. He was elected General Secretary of the fraction. He was arrested again in 1968 and was subsequently released after the 1969 uprising in East Pakistan and the fall of President Ayub Khan. He was defeated in the 1970 national elections.

In the Bangladesh Liberation War he helped organize the training of NAP activists, he was incharge of 60 NAP youth camps. He became a central committee member of BAKSAL in 1975. He was the Minister of Railway in the government headed by Sheikh Mujibur Rahman. After the Assassination of Sheikh Mujibur Rahman, he joined the government of Khondaker Mostaq Ahmad as the State Minister of Road Communication. In 1978 he helped found the Jatiya Party of General Hussain Muhammad Ershad, becoming the party's first chairman.

In 1983 he was arrested after he worked in the movement against general Ershad. In 1986 he was elected convenor of United National Awami Party. In 1986 he was elected to parliament from the Grand Alliance of 15 parties to parliament from Kushtia constituency. In 1990 he was elected President of Ganatantri Party. He was also the vice-principal of Dhaka Law College.

== Death ==
Hossain died in Dhaka, Bangladesh on 12 November 1992.
