= Bheramara Upazila =

Bheramara ভেড়ামারা
- Upazila
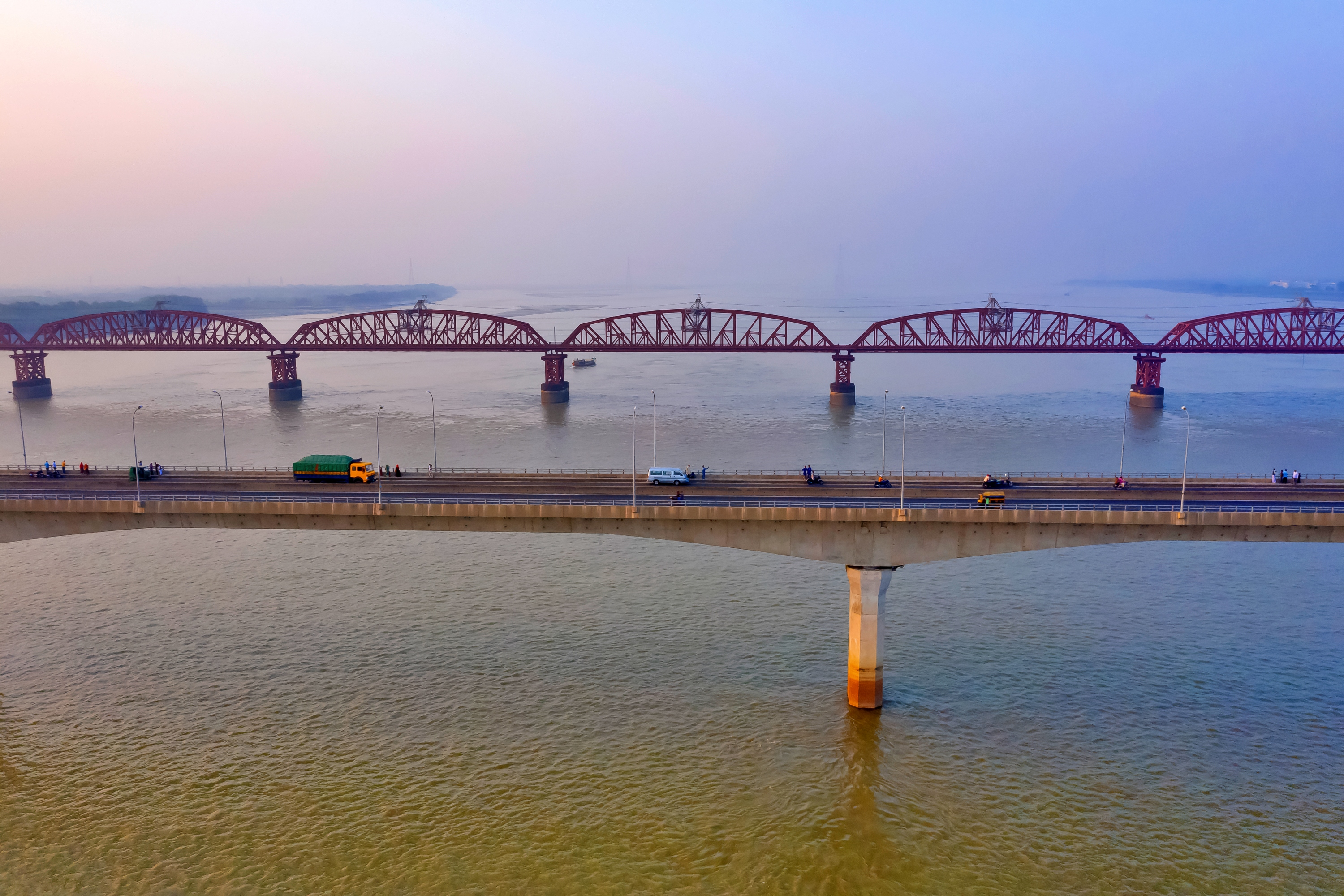
- Hardinge Bridge

- Coordinates: 24°1′N 88°59.5′E
- Country: Bangladesh
- Division: Khulna
- District: Kushtia

Area
  - Total: 153.71 km^{2} (59.35 sq mi)

Population (2022)
  - Total: 225,058
  - Density: 1,464.2/km^{2} (3,792.2/sq mi)
- Time zone: UTC+6 (BST)
- Postal code: 7040
- Area code: 07022
- Website: www.bheramara.net

Bheramara (Bengali: ভেড়ামারা) is an upazila of Kushtia District in the Division of Khulna, Bangladesh. The upazila lies along the Padma River, and the important Hardinge Bridge crosses the river between Bheramara Upazila and Ishwardi Upazila of Pabna District.

== Geography ==
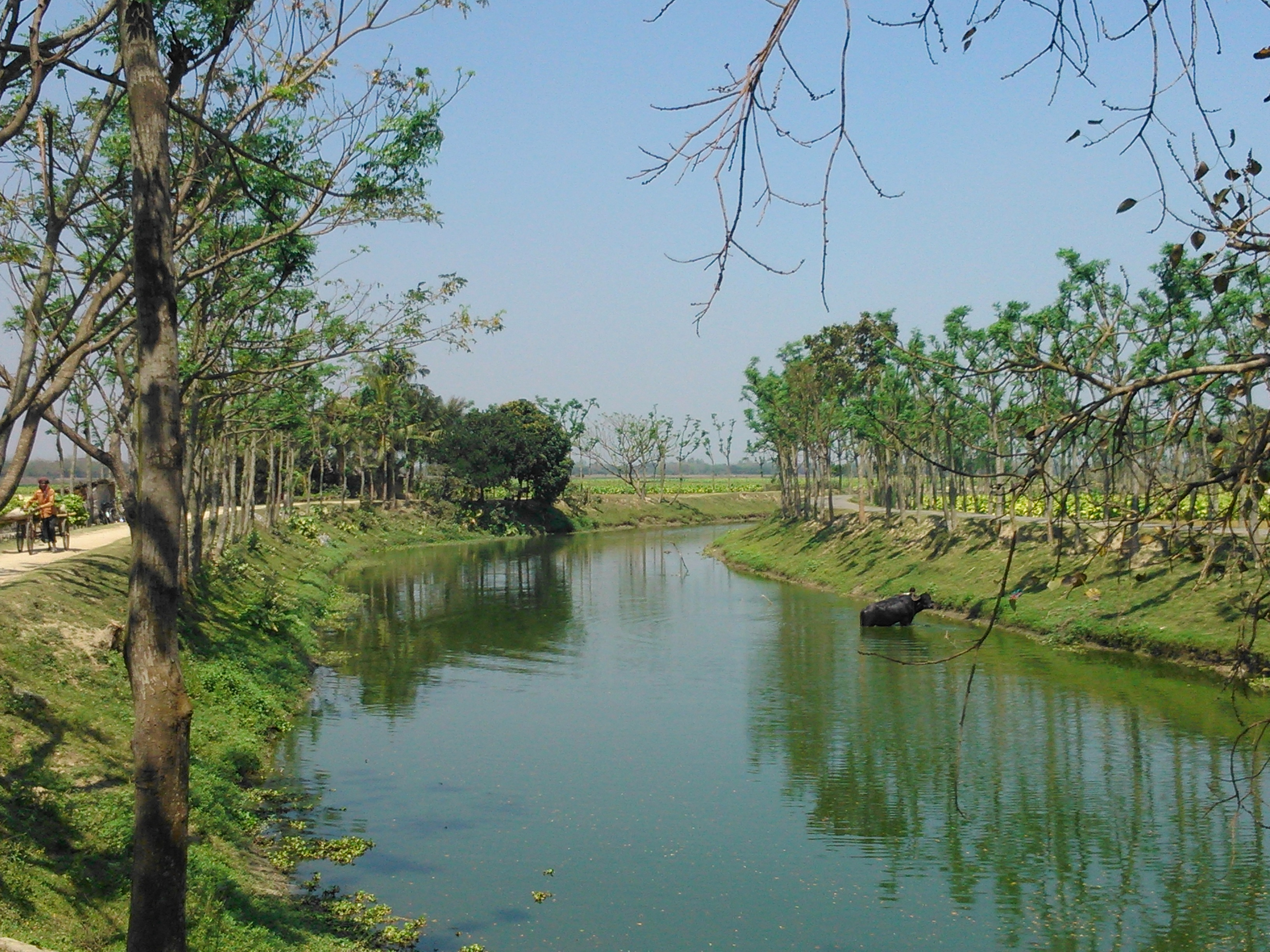
Canal in Bheramara upazila

Bheramara is located at 24.0167°N 88.9917°E. It has 47586 households and total area 153.71 km^{2}.

Bheramara sub-district is located within Kushtia district, Bangladesh and falls roughly within 23° 40′ – 24° 10′ N and 88° 45′ – 89° 20′ E. The town of Bheramara has an area of 3.26 km^{2} and a population of 20,676.

Agriculture is the main occupation of the people, and the major crops are paddy, wheat, mustard, sweet potato, sunflower, onion, garlic, betel leaf, tobacco, and sugarcane. The survey was conducted in Bheramara town and its immediate vicinity.

== Demographics ==
Religions in Bheramara Upazila (2022)
Religion	Percent
Islam	97.84%
Hinduism	2.15%
Other or not stated	0.01%

Bheramara Upazila mauza geocode map

According to the 2022 Bangladeshi census, Bheramara Upazila had 57,560 households and a population of 225,058. 8.76% of the population were under 5 years of age. Bheramara had a literacy rate (age 7 and over) of 71.24%: 71.11% for males and 71.36% for females, and a sex ratio of 92.82 males for every 100 females. 51,466 (22.86%) lived in urban areas.

== Administration ==
Bheramara Thana was formed in 1906 and it was turned into an upazila on 7 November 1983.

Bheramara Upazila is divided into Bheramara Municipality and six union parishads: Bahadurpur, Bahir Char, Chandgram, Dharmapur, Juniadaha, and Mokarimpur. The union parishads are subdivided into 43 mauzas and 78 villages.

Bheramara Municipality is subdivided into 9 wards and 15 mahallas.

== Notable people ==
- Mahbubul Alam Hanif (born 1959), politician

== See also ==
- Upazilas of Bangladesh
- Districts of Bangladesh
- Divisions of Bangladesh
