= Saheb Bari Jame Masjid =

Mosque in Tarail, Kishoregan, Bangladesh

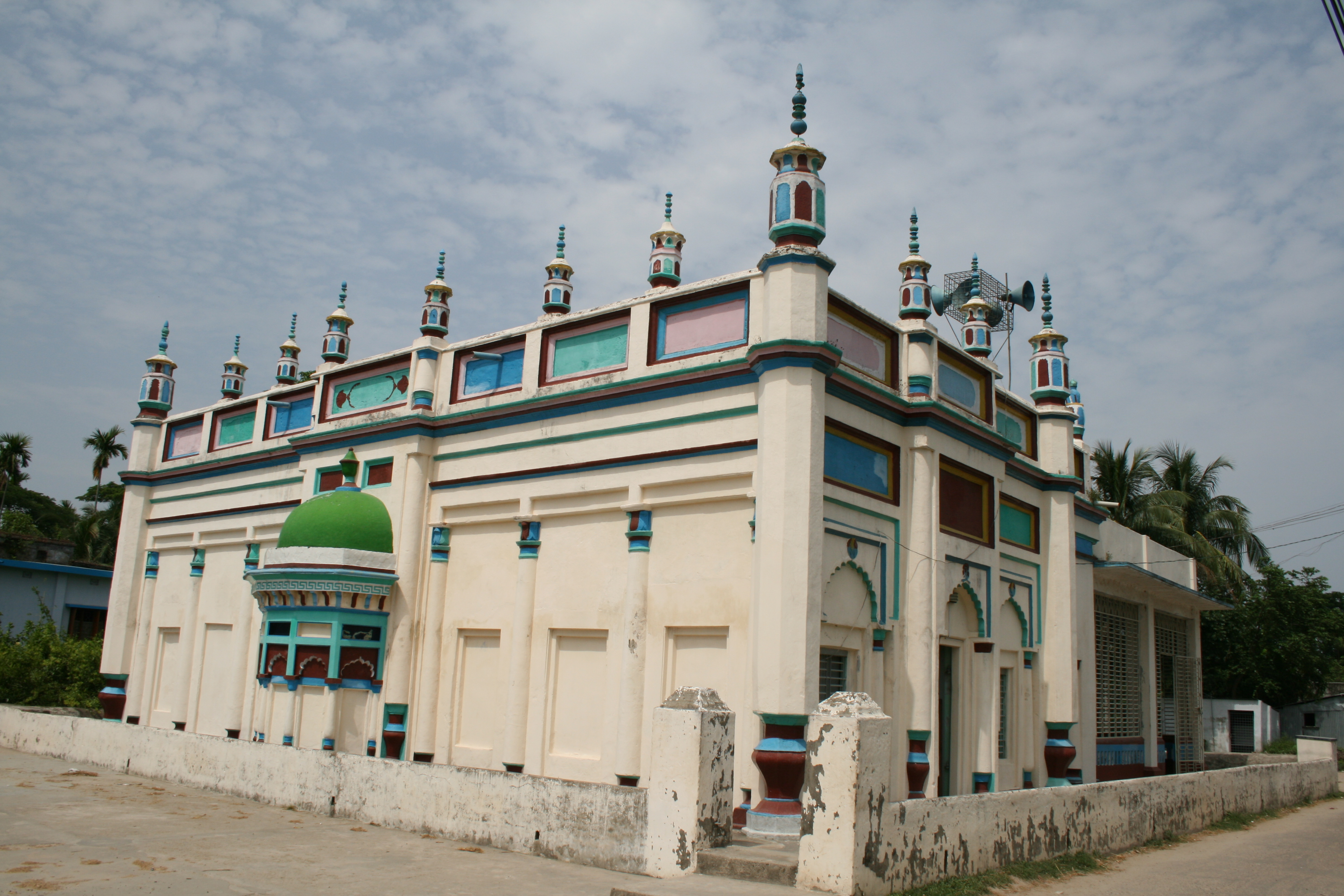

Religion
- Ownership: Bangladesh Archaeology Department

Location
- Location: Zawar, Tarail, Kishoreganj
- Interactive map of Saheb Bari Jame Masjid

Saheb Bari Jame Masjid is an ancient mosque located in Tarail Upazila of Kishoreganj District and is one of the archaeological sites of Bangladesh. It is located in the village of Zawar in Tarail Upazila.

== History ==
The Saheb Bari Jame Masjid was constructed during the reign of Ghiyasuddin Mahmud Shah, the son of Sultan Hussain Shah. According to the original inscription, the mosque was built around 1534. The mosque was constructed by Khan-i-Muazzem Nur Khan, the son of Rahat Khan. Rahat Khan was a physician of the Mughal emperor Akbar. For his medical service, Akbar granted him this area of present-day Tarail. Rahat Khan settled in the present village of Zawar. Another analysis suggests that between the 13th and 16th centuries, when the Koch and Hajong people lived in the area, a commander named Rahat Khan defeated and expelled the local feudal ruler of Zawar and established settlement there. His son Nur Khan, or according to another opinion his grandson Nasrat Khan, constructed this mosque.

== Description ==
The Saheb Bari Jame Masjid is now in a ruined condition. Two black stone slabs were once engraved on the body of the mosque. At present, the slabs are embedded in the front wall of a mosque beside the Zamindar house of West Zawar. There is also a large ancient pond to the east of the mosque.

== See also ==
- List of mosques in Bangladesh
- List of mosques in Dhaka Division
