= Nikli massacre =

1971 massacre in Nikli Upazila, Bangladesh

- Part of 1971 Bangladesh genocide
- Native name: নিকলী / নিকলি গণহত্যা
- Location: 24°19′N 90°56′E; Nikli Upazila, Kishoreganj District, Dhaka Division, Bangladesh
- Date: 21 September 1971
- Target: Bengali Hindus
- Attack type: Burst fire, Mass murder
- Weapons: Machine gun, Bayonets
- Deaths: 35
- Perpetrators: Pakistan Army, Razakar (Pakistan)

Nikli massacre was a premediated massacre of 35 Bengali Hindus in the Dampara Union of Nikli Upazila of Kishoreganj District, Dhaka Division, on 21 September 1971 by the Pakistan Army in collaboration with the Razakars during the Bangladesh Liberation War. According to sources, 35 Bengali Hindus were killed by the Pakistani Forces and the Razakars.

== Background ==
Hindus of the Sutradhar community live in the Mistri Para locality of Dampara Union, in Nikli Upazila of Kishoreganj District. Historically, they were carpenters, hence the name "Mistri Para".

== Events ==
Soldiers of the Pakistan Army, accompanied with the Razakars, arrived at Mistri Para of Dampara Union on 21 September. Then the soldiers and razakars called out all the Hindus, saying that ID cards will be issued to them. With that, they took 39 of the Hindus of Mistri Para in boats to Nikli Thana (Nikli police station).

After reaching the police station, four of them were kept inside lockup for being too young. The rest were tied behind their backs and tortured till evening, after which they were taken to the cremation grounds near Showaijoni river in Nikli. The captives were made to stand in line and gunned down with machine gunfire. On being confirmed dead, the razakars carried the dead bodies with fishhooks to the Dhulachar Haor in Nikli, and then dumped them in the water. The next morning they released the four boys who were held in lockup.

After the killings, the widowed women of Mistri Para were raped by the Pakistani soldiers and Razakars.

== Aftermath ==
In 2015, a commemoration ceremony was organized for the first time on 21 September for the martyrs. A small memorial has been made for the martyrs by the locals, which is decorated on September 21 every year. The government has neither given recognition nor financial support to the families of the victims.
