= Pagla Mosque =

Mosque in Kishoreganj, Bangladesh

- পাগলা মসজিদ ও ইসলামিক কমপ্লেক্স
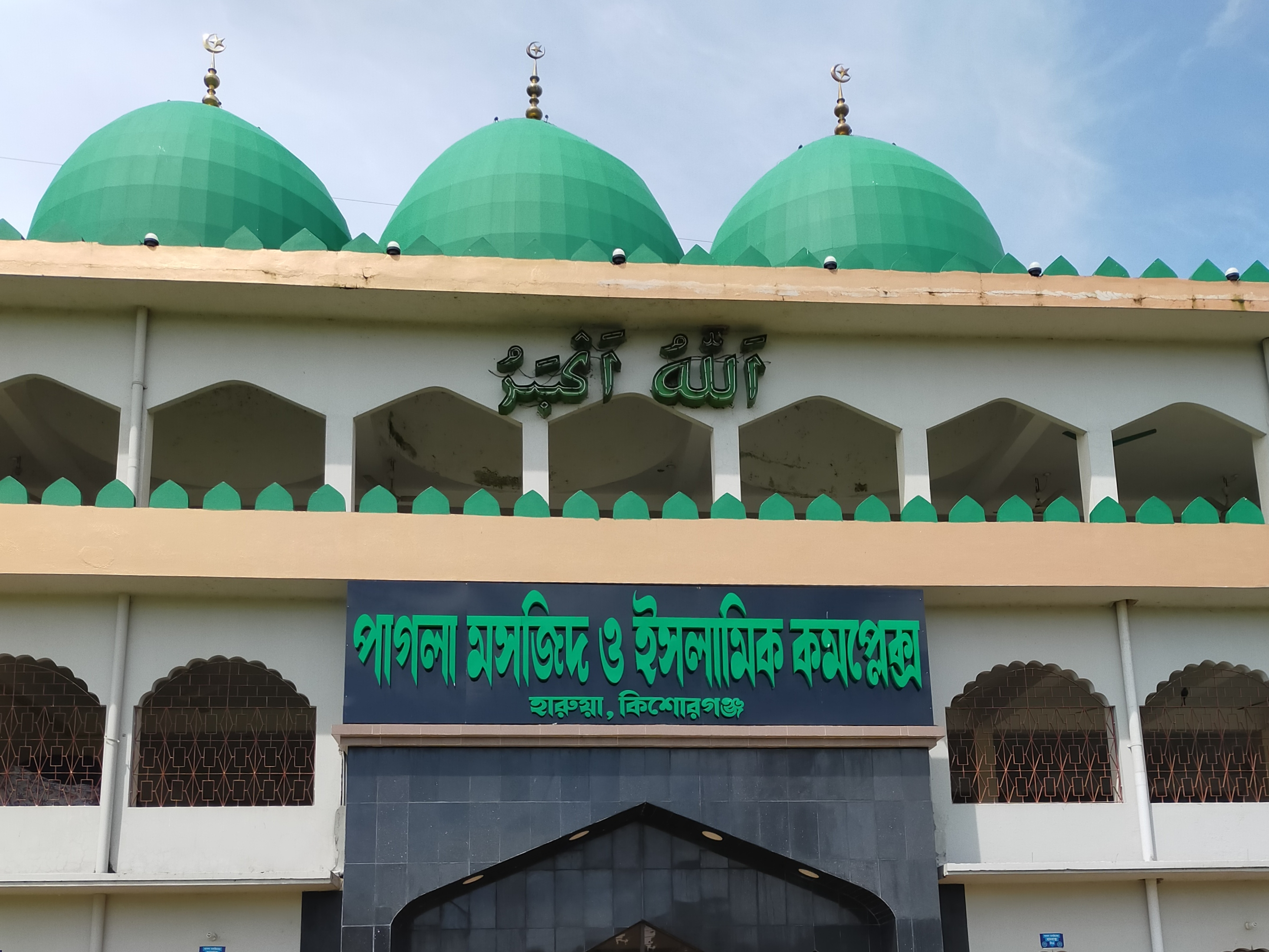

- Location of the mosque in Bangladesh

Religion
- Affiliation: Islam
- Ecclesiastical or organizational status: Mosque
- Leadership: Mufti Khalilur Rahman
- Patron: State Waqf
- Status: Active

Location
- Location: Harua, Sadar, Kishoreganj, Dhaka Division
- Country: Bangladesh
- Interactive map of Pagla Mosque
- Coordinates: 24°26′39″N 90°46′18″E

Architecture
- Type: Mosque architecture
- Style: Modernist
- Completed: 20th century

Specifications
- Capacity: 600 worshipers
- Dome: Three
- Minaret: One
- Site area: 1.57 ha (3.88 acres)

Website
- https://paglamosque.org/

The Pagla Mosque (Bengali: পাগলা মসজিদ, romanized: Pāglā Môsjid), officially the Pagla Mosque and Islamic Complex, is an old mosque located on the banks of the Narsunda River in Harua, in the Kishoreganj District of the Dhaka Division in Bangladesh. The three-storey mosque has a towering minaret. The complex was established on a 1.57-hectare (3.88-acre) site. Since 10 May 1979, the State Waqf has managed the mosque.

== Legends ==
According to a legend, a spiritual personality named Dewan Zil Kadar Khan, alias Zil Kadar Pagla Sahib, a descendant of Isa Khan of the Haibatnagar Zamindar family in the region, used to pray on the banks of the Narsunda River. Later, a mosque was built at the site. The mosque came to be known as the Pagla Mosque after Zil Kadar Pagla. According to another legend, the mosque was named after the Pagla Bibi of the then Haibatnagar Zamindar family of Kishoreganj.

== See also ==
- Islam in Bangladesh
- List of mosques in Bangladesh
- List of mosques in Dhaka Division
