= Guroi Shahi Mosque =

Mosque in Kishoreganj, Bangladesh

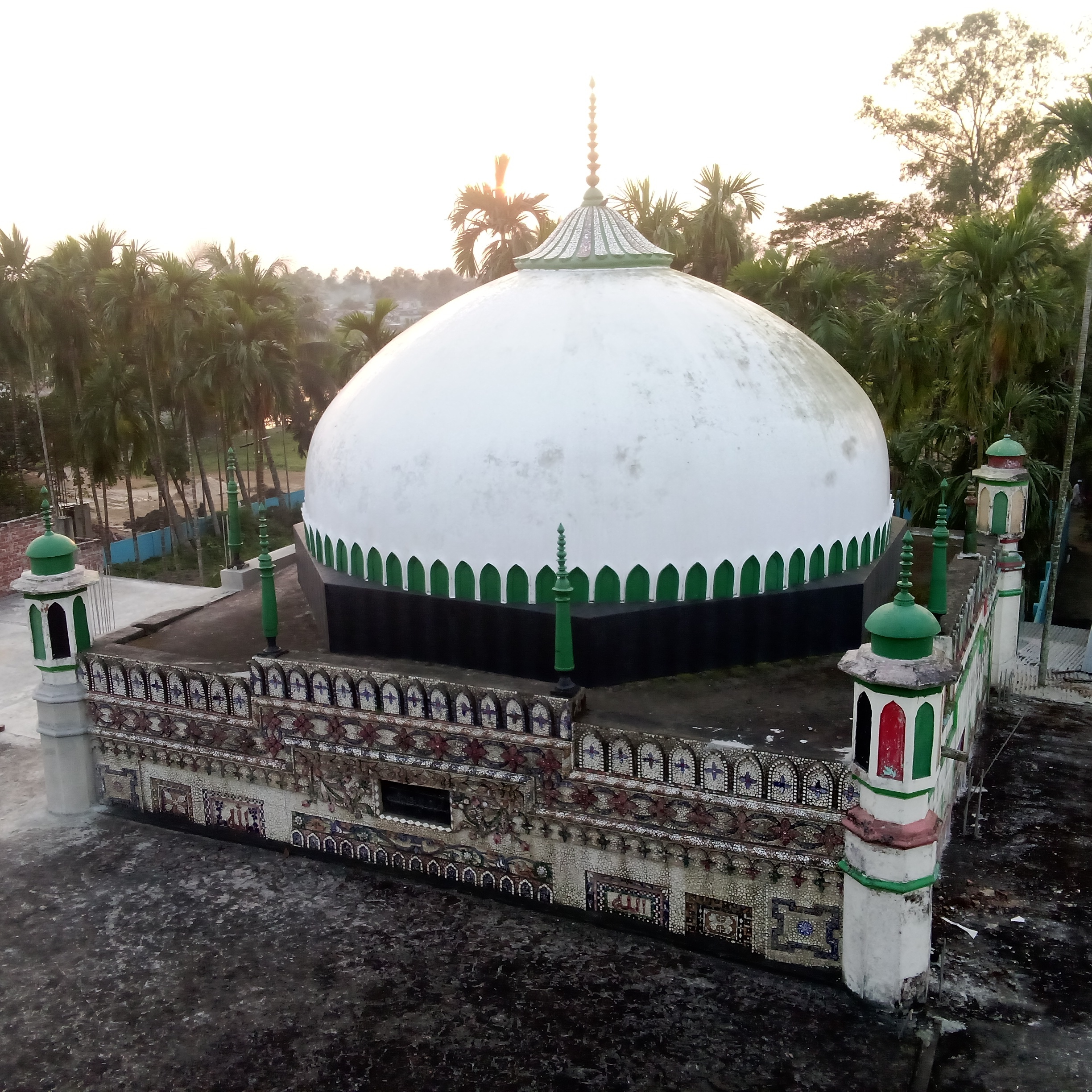
- Image of the mosque's single dome
- Interactive map of the Guroi Shahi Mosque area
- Alternative names: Gurai Shahi Mosque

General information
- Location: Guroi, Nikli Upazila, Kishoreganj District, Bangladesh
- Coordinates: 24°16′18″N 90°56′09″E
- Owner: Department of Archaeology (Bangladesh)
- Landlord: Sultan Barbak Shah

Height
- Height: 35 ft (11 m)

The Guroi Shahi Mosque is an ancient mosque located in Nikli Upazila of Kishoreganj District and is one of the archaeological sites of Bangladesh. It is located in the village of Guroi in Nikli Upazila.

== History ==
The Guroi displays architectural features of the Mughal period. There is a narrow and long inscription at the base of the mosque’s dome. According to the inscription, the mosque was constructed around 1680. The name of Sultan Barbak Shah is engraved on the inscription.

== Description ==
The Guroi Shahi Mosque is square in shape. The height of the walls is 22 feet from the inside and 35 feet from the outside. There are four octagonal minarets at the four corners, which rise upward and end with small domes made of silver. The mosque also has a large bulb-shaped dome. There are three entrances on the north, south, and east walls, one on each side, among which the eastern or central entrance is larger. The height of the central entrance is 7 feet 3 inches and its width is 4 feet 6 inches. The western wall contains three mihrabs, with the central mihrab being larger than the others. The mihrabs feature beautiful terracotta ornamentation. Architectural influences from the Sultanate period can also be observed in this mosque.

== See also ==
- List of mosques in Bangladesh
- List of mosques in Dhaka Division
