= Bhairab Poura Stadium =

Stadium in Bhairab, Kishoreganj, Bangladesh

Coordinates: 24°03′59.21″N 90°58′38.60″E

Bhairab Stadium
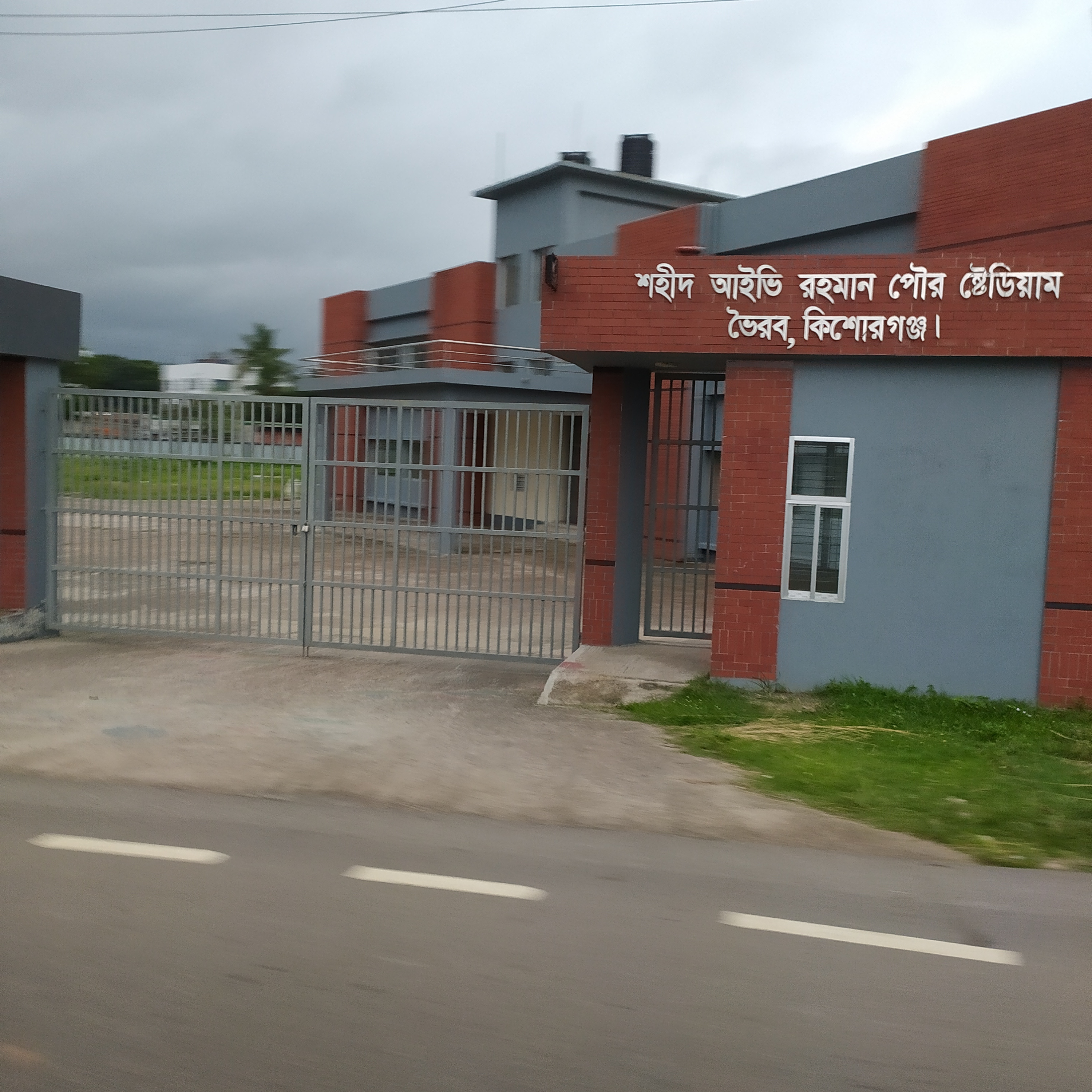
- Interactive map of Bhairab Stadium
- Location: Bhairab, Kishoreganj, Bangladesh
- Surface: Grass

Tenants
- Bhairab Football Team; Bhairab Cricket Team

Bhairab Stadium (formerly known as Shaheed Ivy Rahman Poura Stadium) is located by Stadium Rd, Bhairab, Kishoreganj, Bangladesh.

== See also ==
- Stadiums in Bangladesh
- List of cricket grounds in Bangladesh
- Sheikh Kamal International Stadium, Cox's Bazar
- Sheikh Kamal International Stadium, Gopalganj
