= Qutb Mosque =

Coordinates: 24.279117°N 91.110876°E

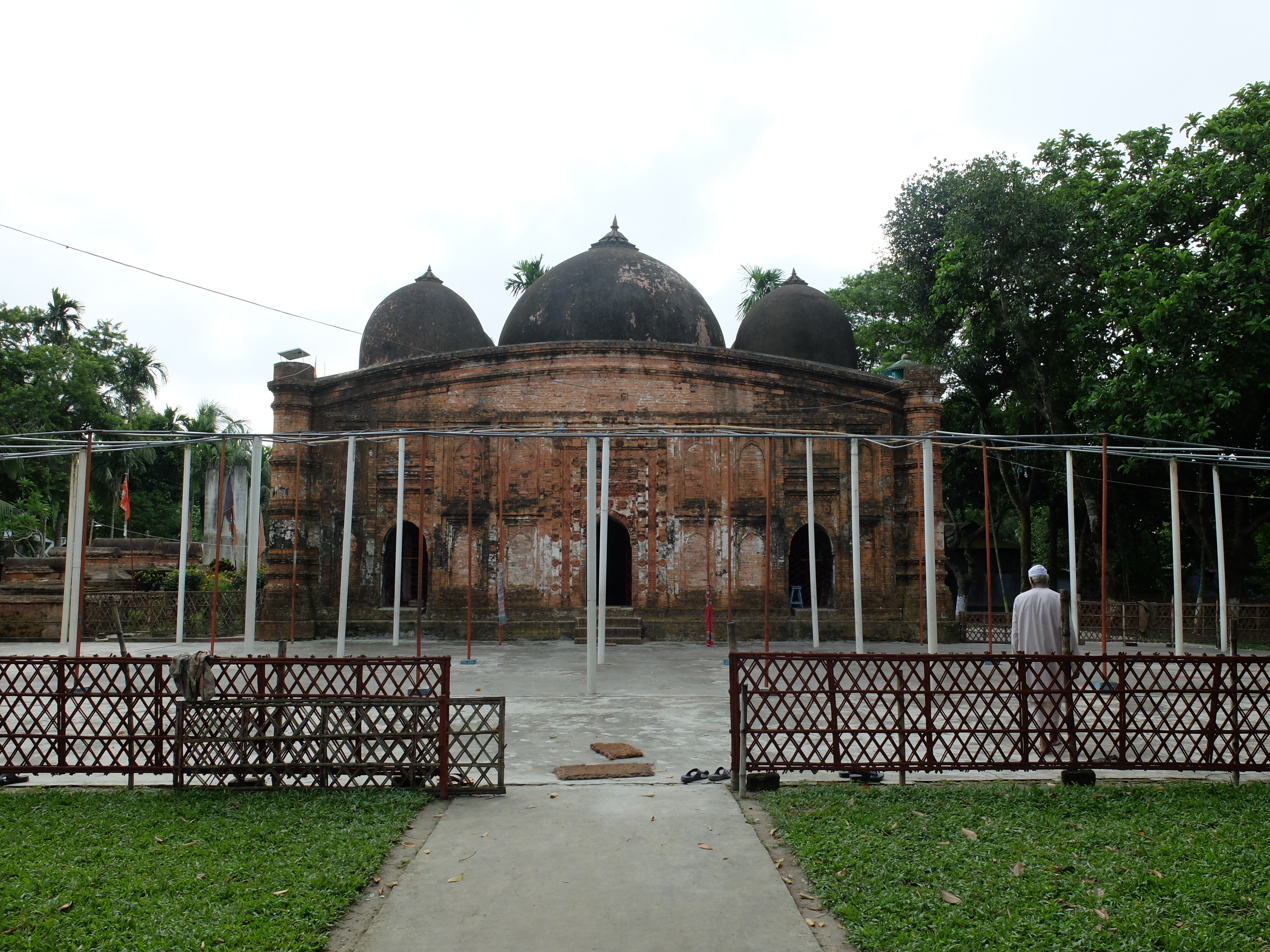
- Interactive map of Qutb Mosque
- Type: Archaeological site
- Location: Ashtagram Sadar, Ashtagram

Site notes
- Area: Kishoreganj District
- Owner: Department of Archaeology (Bangladesh)

Qutb Mosque or Qutb Shah Mosque is an archaeological monument located in Ashtagram Upazila of Kishoreganj District and is an ancient mosque of Bangladesh. The mosque is believed to have been built during the Sultanate period.

== History ==
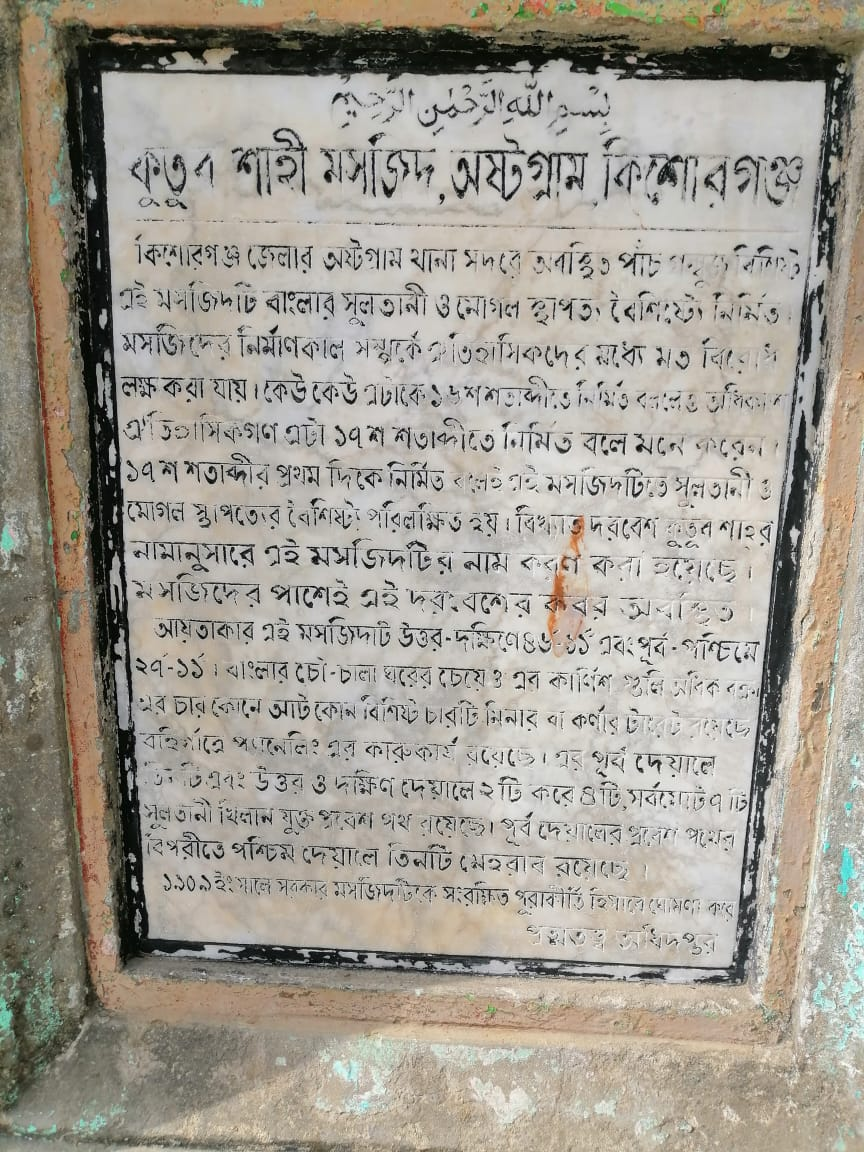

When the Qutb Mosque was discovered, no inscription was found on it. Therefore, there is little information about its exact construction date. However, based on its architectural style and other features, archaeologists assume that it was built during the Sultanate period in the 16th century. There is a grave beside the mosque which is believed to belong to Qutb Shah. The mosque is named Qutb Mosque or Qutb Shah Mosque after him. In 1909, the then Department of Archaeology listed it as a protected monument.

== Structure ==
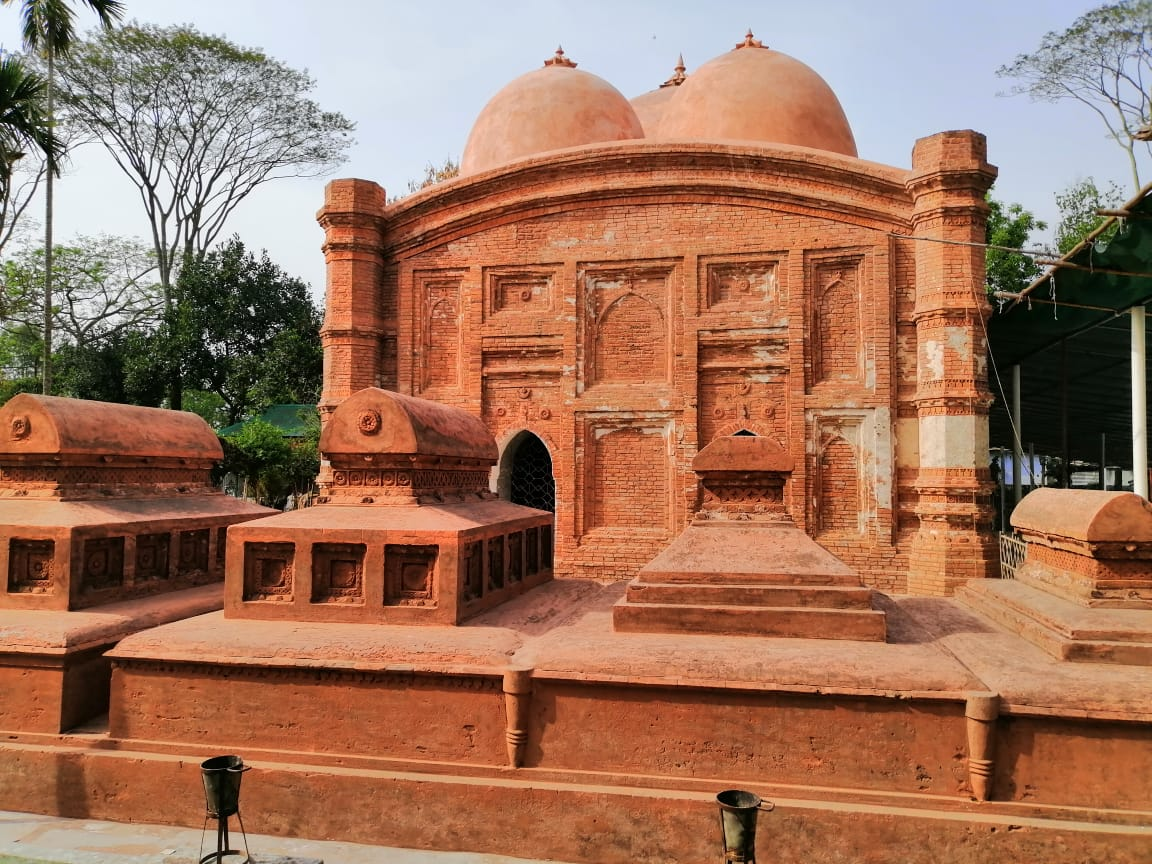
Kutub Mosque of Ashtagram Upazila, photographed in March 2021

The square-shaped Qutb Mosque has four corner towers, each octagonal in shape. The mosque is longer in the north–south direction and wider in the east–west direction. There are four minarets above the octagonal towers. The mosque has a total of five domes. Except for the western wall, the other three walls contain entrances, making a total of five entrances, of which three are on the eastern side.

Various designs are carved on the outer walls of the Qutb Mosque. The cornice of the roof of this Sultanate-period mosque is curved. It is believed to be the oldest surviving Sultanate-period mosque in the then Mymensingh region.

== Gallery ==
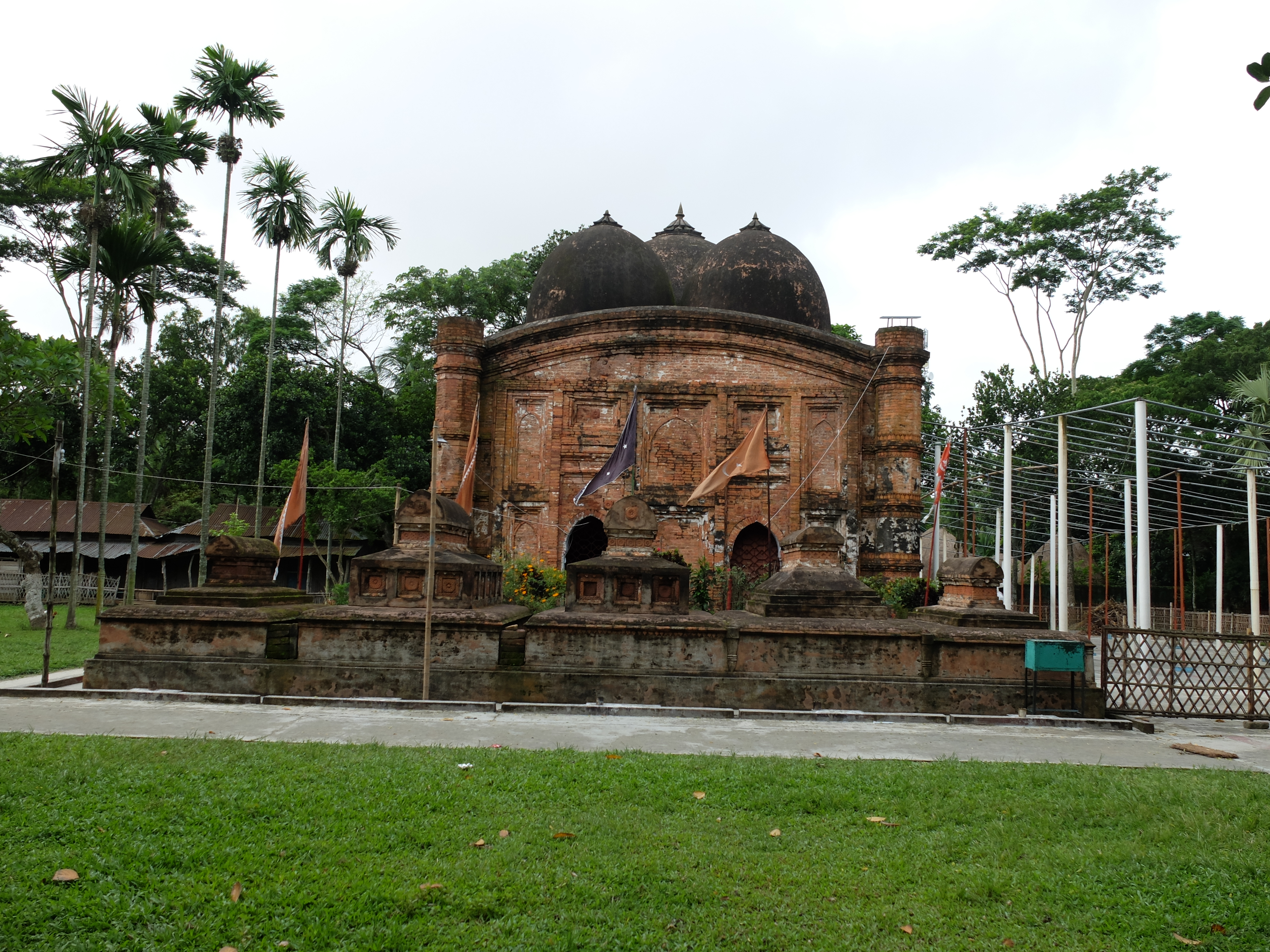

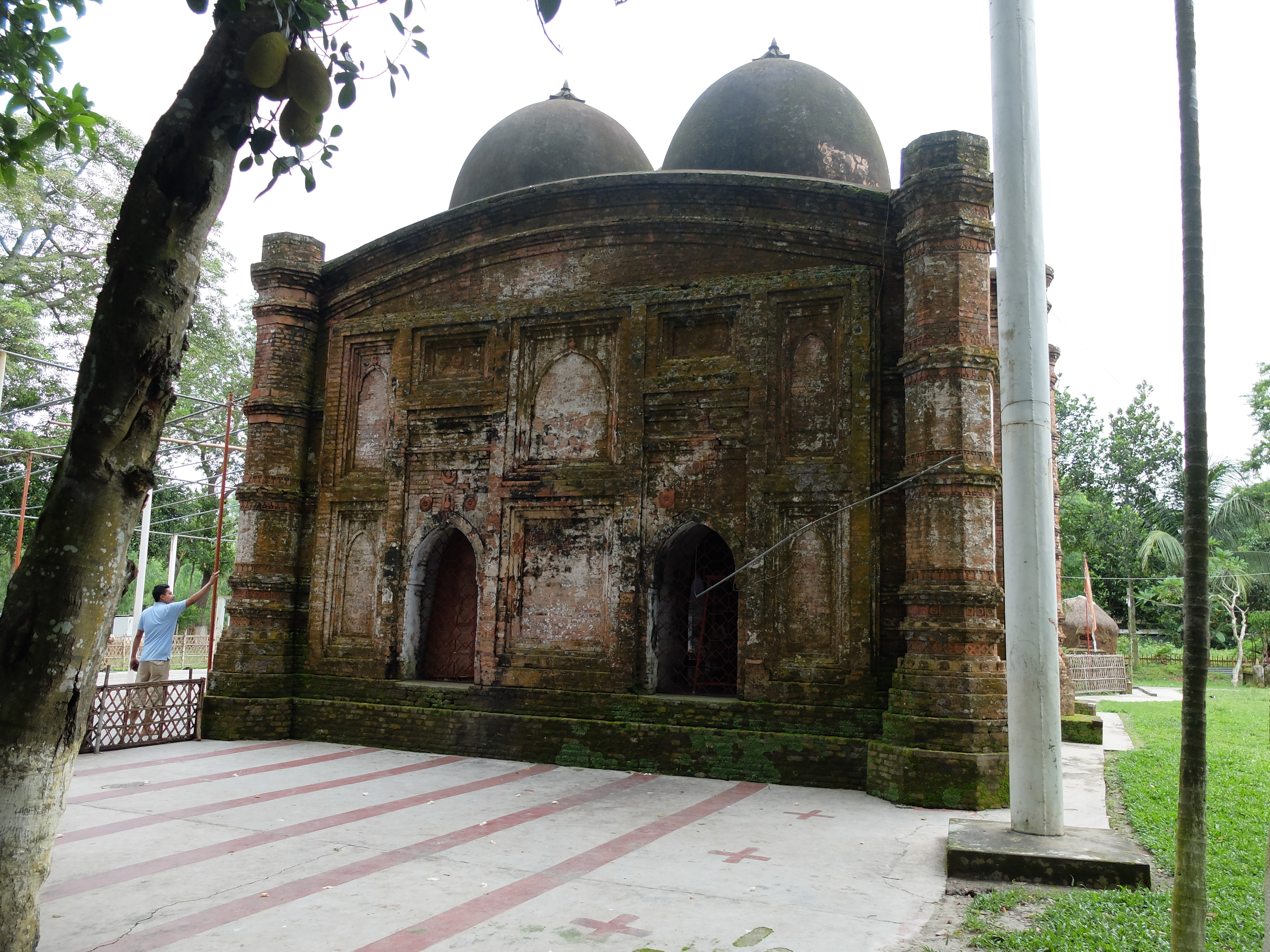

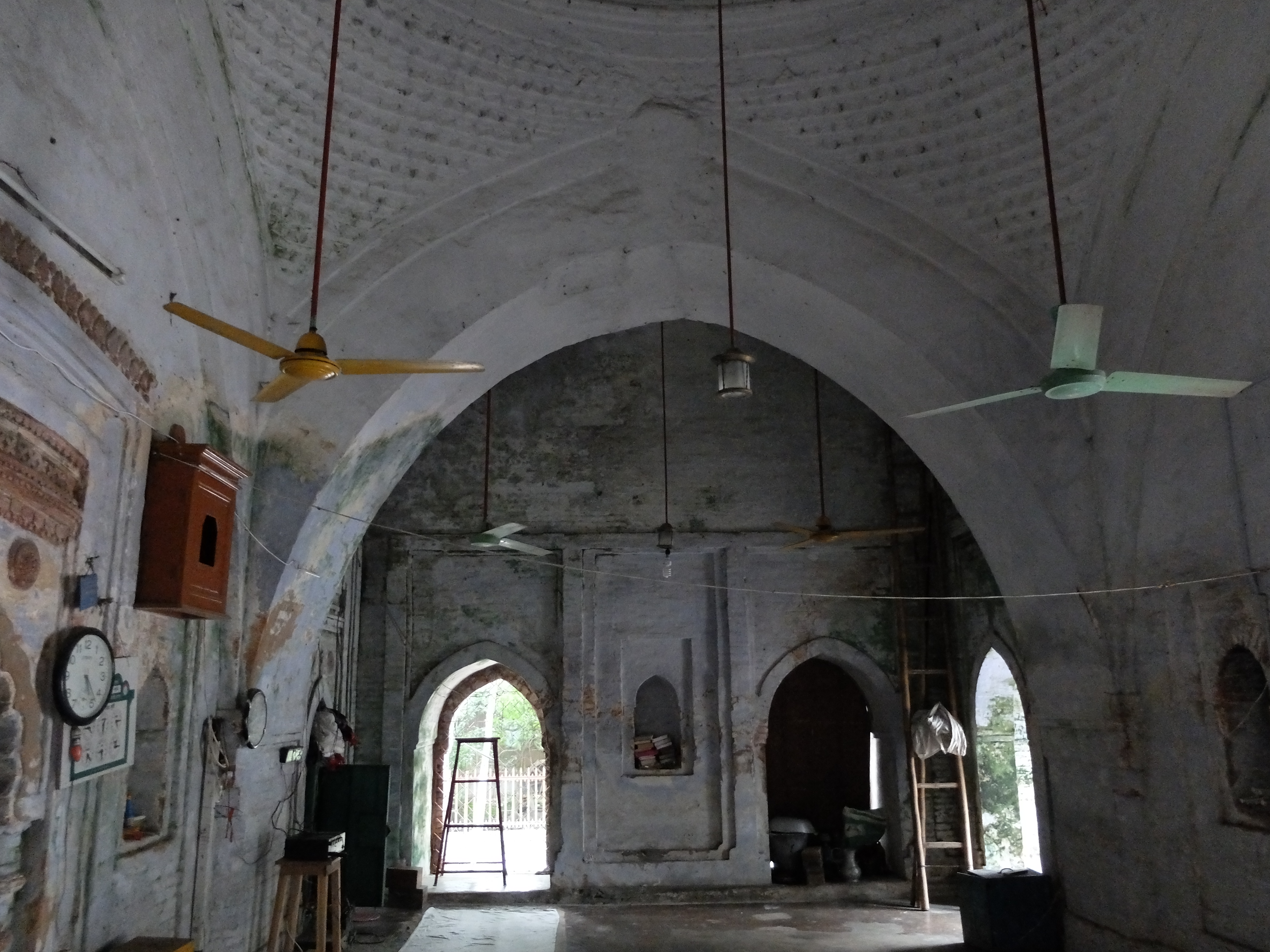

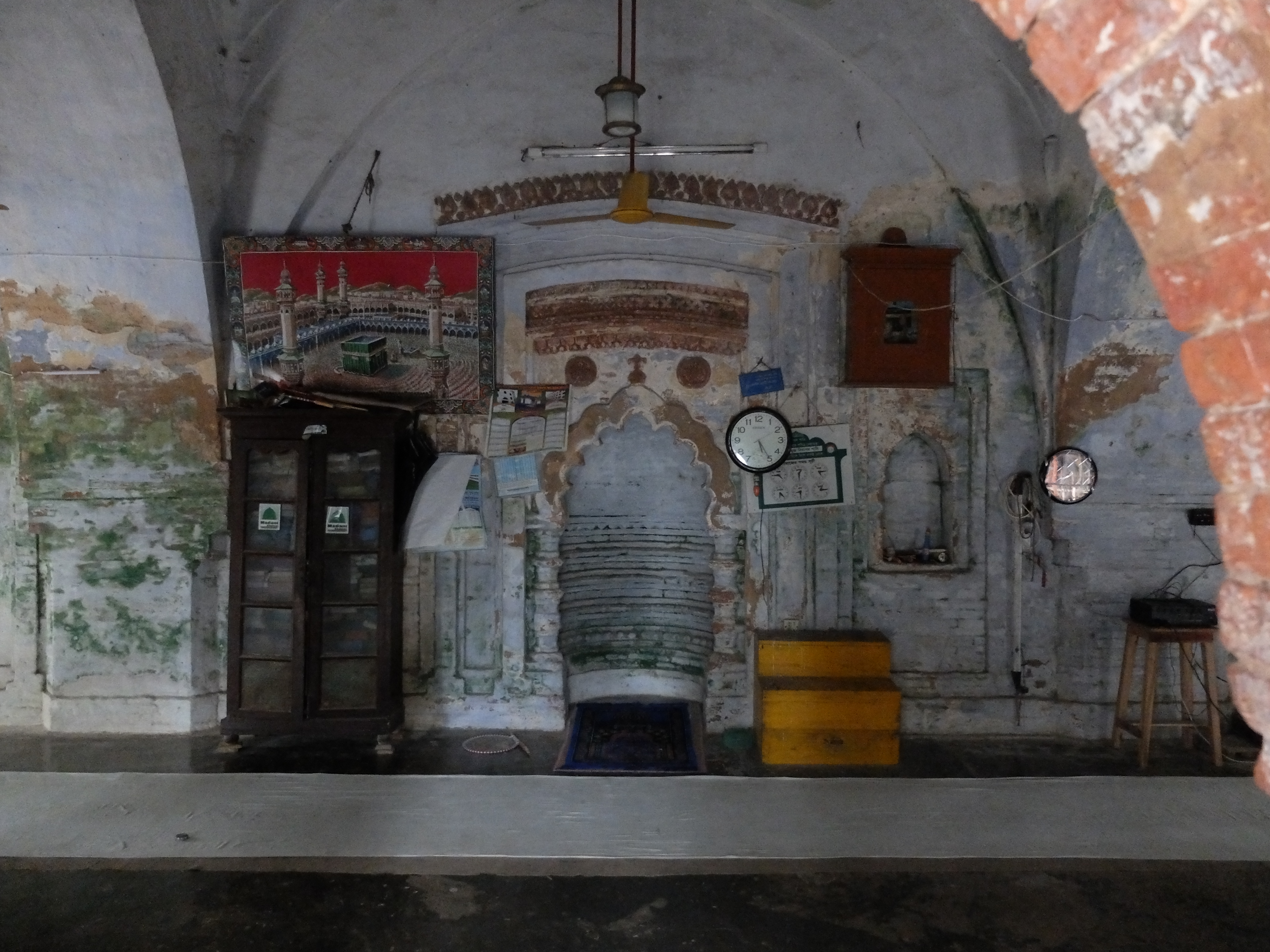

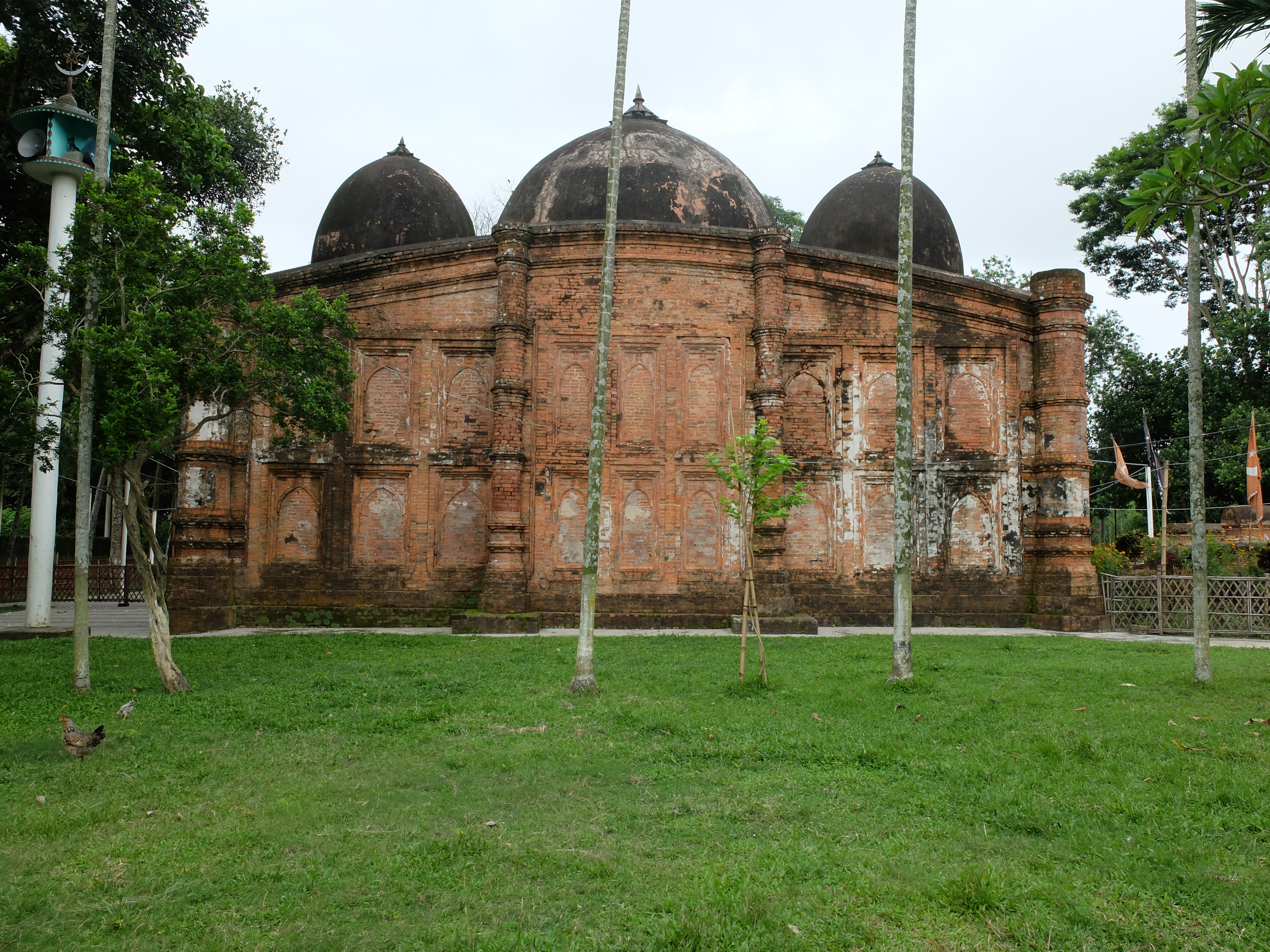

== See also ==
- List of archaeological sites in Bangladesh
- List of mosques in Bangladesh
- List of mosques in Dhaka Division
