= Nur Khan of Bengal =

Bengali statesman

Khan-i-Muazzam Nur Khan

Governor of Iqlim-e-Muazzamabad
- In office 1534
- Monarch: Ghiyasuddin Mahmud Shah

Nur Khan (Bengali: নূর খান) was a 16th-century regional governor, mosque patron, and senior official within the Sultanate of Bengal. He is remembered for his patronage of a mosque situated in Jawar, part of the Muazzamabad province, and is venerated as the genealogical forefather of some locals of this region.

== Biography ==
Nur Khan was the son of Rahat Khan, a military commander and court physician. Following this royal benefaction, Rahat Khan established his home in the village of Jawar. Between the 13th and 16th centuries, Jowar was inhabited by the Koch and Hajong tribes. During this period, Rahat Khan purportedly defeated the tribal chief and subsequently consolidated his authority over the region. In recognition of his medical prowess and loyal service, his father Rahat Khan was endowed with a substantial tract of jagir in the Nasirujial pargana, in what is now Tarail, Kishoreganj District, Bangladesh.

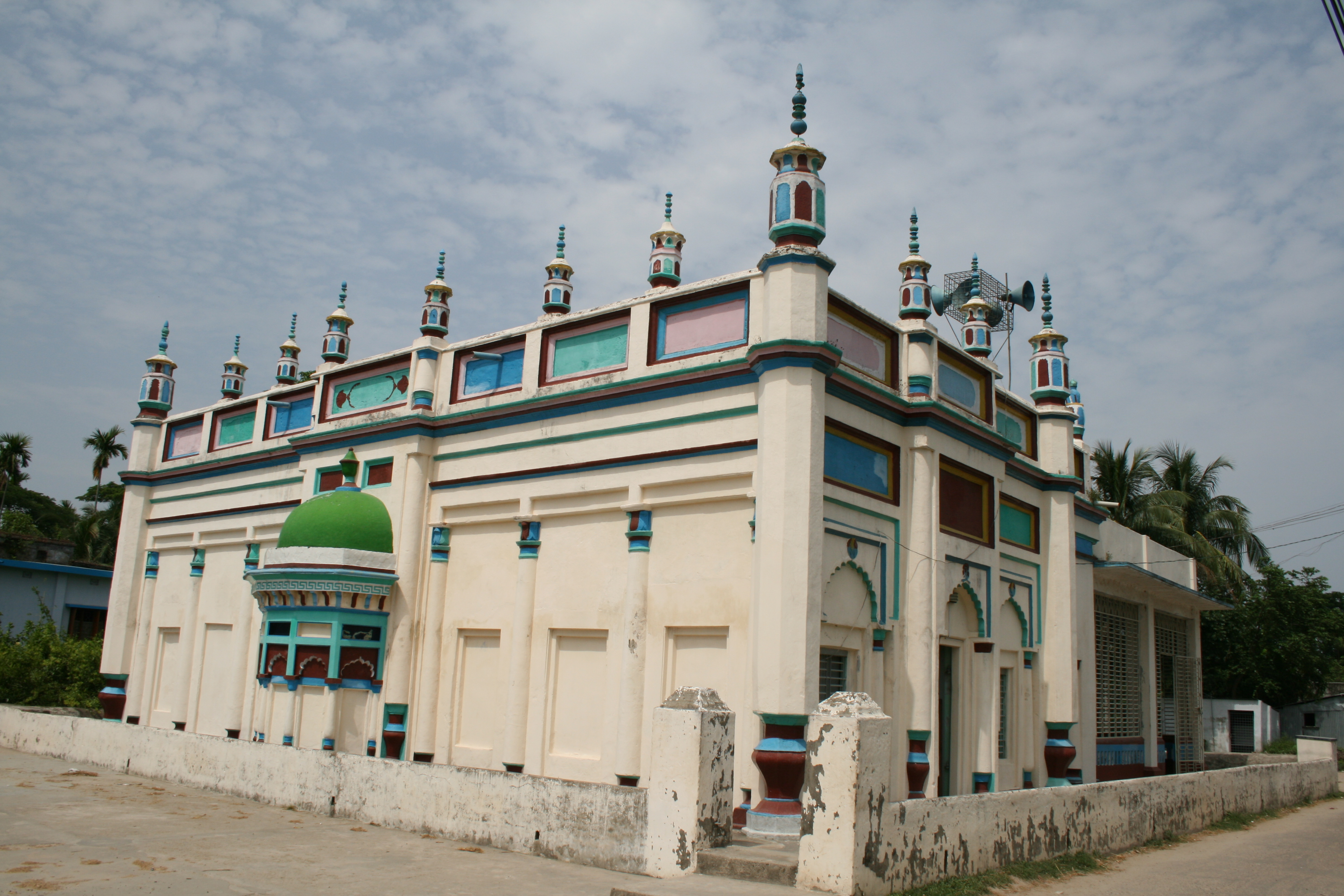
The Saheb Bari mosque Kisoreganj

In 1533, Nur Khan was serving as the appointed regional governor of Muazzamabad, under the auspices of Sultan Ghiyasuddin Mahmud Shah. According to regional oral traditions, the Sultan bestowed his daughter, Princess Iqlema of Bengal, in marriage to Nur Khan. Along with his son Nasrat Khan, Nur Khan commenced the construction of a mosque adjacent to his home, the Jawar Haveli Bari. Concurrently, he undertook the excavation of a substantial reservoir (dighi) within the settlement. Though more than four centuries have elapsed since its erection, traces of the original mosque persist, preserving Nur Khan's architectural and religious legacy. A stone inscription in Classical Arabic, originally affixed to the mosque, has been preserved and subsequently installed within the Saheb Bari mosque of the Jawar Zamindar family. The descendants of Nur Khan established themselves prominently across the villages of Jawar, Dhala, and Kaluma.

== See also ==
- Shah Sultan Rumi
- Majlis Khan Humayun
