= Bhairab =

Town in Bangladesh

Bhairab Bengali: ভৈরব
- City
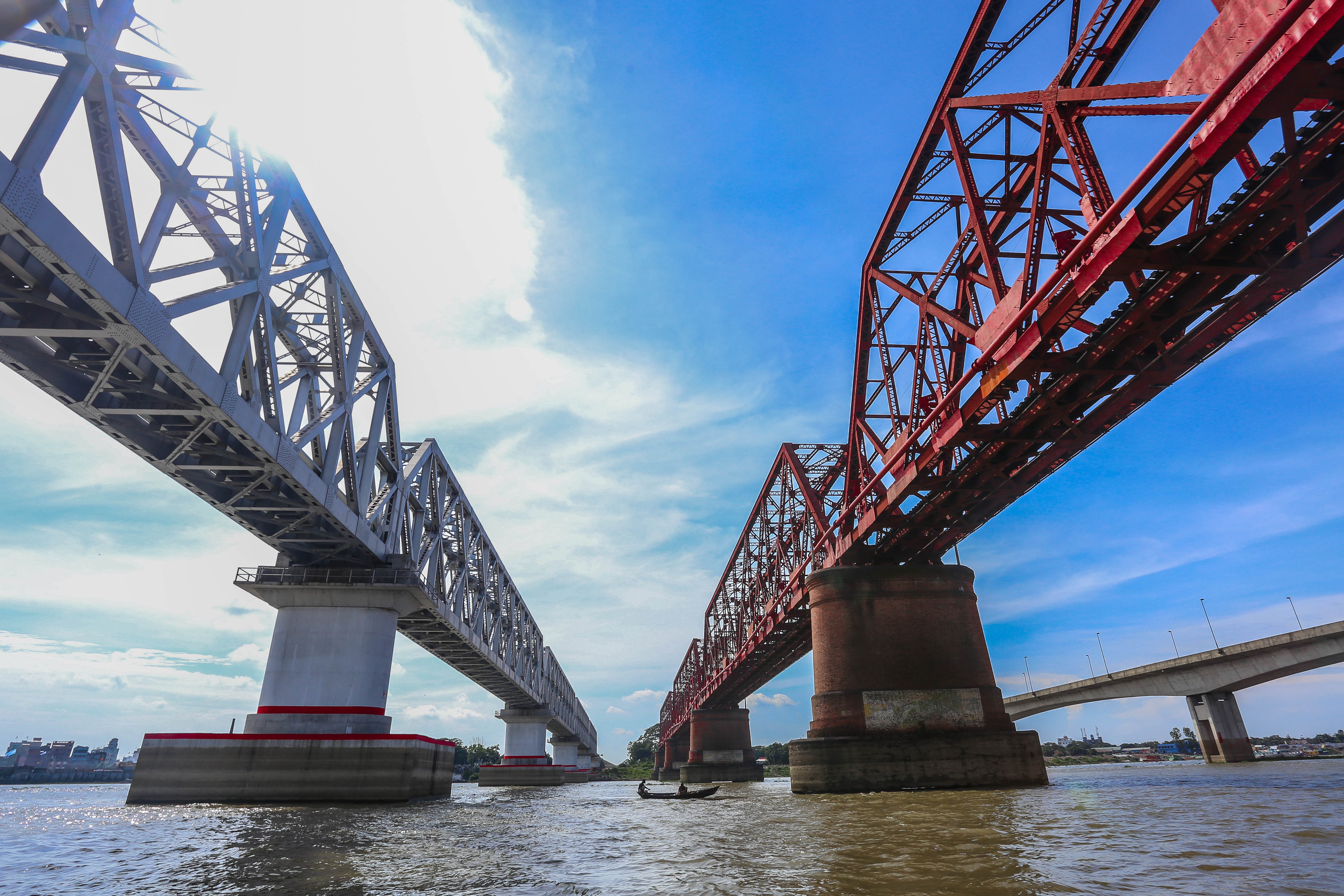
- Syed Nazrul Islam Bridge over the Meghna River

- Location in Dhaka division Bhairab (Bangladesh)
- Coordinates: 24.044577°N 90.986052°E
- Country: Bangladesh
- Division: Dhaka
- District: Kishoreganj
- Upazila: Bhairab

Area
  - Total: 15.71 km^{2} (6.07 sq mi)

Population (2022)
  - Total: 156,293
  - Density: 9,949/km^{2} (25,770/sq mi)

Bhairab (Bengali: ভৈরব), also known as Bhairab Bazar (ভৈরব বাজার) is a city in central Bangladesh, located in Kishoreganj District in Dhaka Division. It is the administrative headquarters and urban centre of Bhairab Upazila. Around 156,000 people live here which makes this city the largest in Kishoreganj District and 32nd largest city in Bangladesh. Bhairab is an important railway junction in eastern Bangladesh, connecting Dhaka with Chattogram and Sylhet.

== Geography ==
Bhairab City is located at 24.044577°N 90.986052°E in the Kishoreganj District of central region of Bangladesh.

== Demographics ==
Religion in Bhairab Paurashava (2022)
| Religion | Percent |
| Islam | 94.35% |
| Hinduism | 5.63% |
| Other or not stated | 0.02% |

Bhairab Municipality mahallah geocode map

According to the 2022 Bangladesh census, Bhairab Paurashava had 35,496 households and a population of 156,297. Bhairab had a literacy rate of 71.82%: 71.71% for males and 71.93% for females, and a sex ratio of 98.98 males per 100 females. 11.75% of the population was under 5 years of age.

According to 2011 Bangladesh census the total population of the city was 118,992 of which 60,284 are males and 58,708 are females with a density of 7,574 people per km^{2}. The number of total household of the city is 24,057. In 2022, Bhairab had a population of 156,293 with a literacy rate of 77.82%.

== Administration ==
Bhairab City is governed by a Paurashava called Bhairab municipality which consists of 12 wards and 29 mahallas, which occupies an area of 15.71 km^{2}.
