= Sheikh Kamal International Stadium =

Sheikh Kamal International Stadium may refer to:

- Sheikh Kamal International Stadium, Cox's Bazar
- Sheikh Kamal International Stadium, Gopalganj
