= Kishoreganj University =

Public university in Bangladesh

- কিশোরগঞ্জ বিশ্ববিদ্যালয়
- Other name: KiU
- Former name: Bangabandhu Sheikh Mujibur Rahman University (2020-2025)
- Type: Public university
- Established: 2020; 6 years ago
- Chancellor: President Mirza Fakhrul Islam Alamgir
- Vice-Chancellor: Professor Dr. Dilip Kumar Barua
- Location: Kishoreganj District, Dhaka, Bangladesh; 24.4415°N 90.7755°E
- Campus: 103.87 acres
- Website: kiu.ac.bd

Kishoreganj University (Bengali: কিশোরগঞ্জ বিশ্ববিদ্যালয়) or simply KiU is a government funded public university in Bangladesh. It is located in the town of Kishoreganj in the division of Dhaka. It was established in 2020. On 24 January 2020 in regular cabinet meeting, the then prime minister, agreed in principle to the Acts for establishing this university in Kishoreganj District. Z M Parvez Sazzad, a professor of Dhaka University, is serving as the founding vice-chancellor of University of Kishoreganj since 27 January 2021.

== About KiU ==
KiU offers undergraduate and postgraduate programs in a range of disciplines, including business administration, English, engineering, and science. The university has seven faculties and more than thirty departments.

After the fall of the Sheikh Hasina led Awami League government, Bangabandhu Sheikh Mujibur Rahman University was renamed to Kishoreganj University in February 2025.

== Academics ==
=== Faculties ===
==== Faculty of Arts ====
- Department of English

==== Faculty of Science ====
- Department of Mathematics

==== Faculty of Business Studies ====
- Department of Accounting

==== Faculty of Engineering ====
- Department of Computer Science and Engineering

Upcoming departments

==== Faculty of Arts ====
- Department of Bengali (proposed)
- Department of Philosophy and Ethics (proposed)
- Department of History (proposed)
- Department of Law (proposed)
- Department of Fine Arts (proposed)
- Department of Music and Theatre Studies (proposed)

==== Faculty of Science ====
- Department of Physics and Astronomy (Proposed)
- Department of Chemistry (Proposed)
- Department of Statistics and Information Science (Proposed)
- Department of Geography and Water Resources Management (Proposed)

==== Faculty of Social Sciences ====
- Department of Political Science and Bangladesh Studies (Proposed)
- Department of Social Work (Proposed)
- Department of Economics (Proposed)
- Department of Population Sciences (Proposed)
- Department of International Relations (Proposed)
- Department of Sociology and Anthropology (Proposed)

==== Faculty of Business Studies ====
- Department of Management (Proposed)
- Department of Marketing (Proposed)
- Department of Finance (Proposed)

==== Faculty of Biology ====
- Department of Molecular Biology and Genetic Engineering (Proposed)
- Department of Pharmacy (Proposed)
- Department of Biochemistry and Microbiology (Proposed)
- Department of Fisheries and Aquaculture (Proposed)
- Department of Botany and Plant Biology (Proposed)
- Department of Zoology (Proposed)
- Department of Environment and Ecology (Proposed)
- Department of Marine Science and Blue Economy (Proposed)
- Department of Food Science and Technology (Proposed)
- Department of Public Health (Proposed)

==== Faculty of Engineering ====
- Department of Electrical and Electronic Engineering (Proposed)
- Department of Civil and Environmental Engineering (Proposed)
- Department of Physical Science and Engineering Department of Biomedical Engineering (Proposed)
- Department of Chemical Engineering (Proposed)
- Department of Mechanical and Production Engineering (Proposed)
- Department of Nuclear Science and Engineering (Proposed)

=== Institutes ===
- Institute of Intelligent Systems for Automation
- Institute of Information Technology and Communication System Development
- Institute of Environment and Sustainable Development
- Institute of Supply Chain Management

=== Centers ===
- Centre for Skill Development
- Centre for Bangladesh and South Asia Studies
- Centre for Waste Management

== Research ==
=== Research centers ===
- Centre for Nanoscience and Engineering (CNE)
- Centre for Biosystems Science and Engineering (CBSSE)
- Centre for Communications, Networking, Signal and Image Processing (CcNSIP)
- Centre for Infrastructure, Sustainable Transportation and Urban Planning (CiSTUP)
- Centre for Interdisciplinary Mathematical Sciences (CeIMS)
- Centre for Society and Policy (CSP)
- Centre for Energy Research (CER)
