= Nikli Haor =

Seasonal wetland and tourists' spot in Bangladesh

Coordinates: 24.370°N 91.075°E

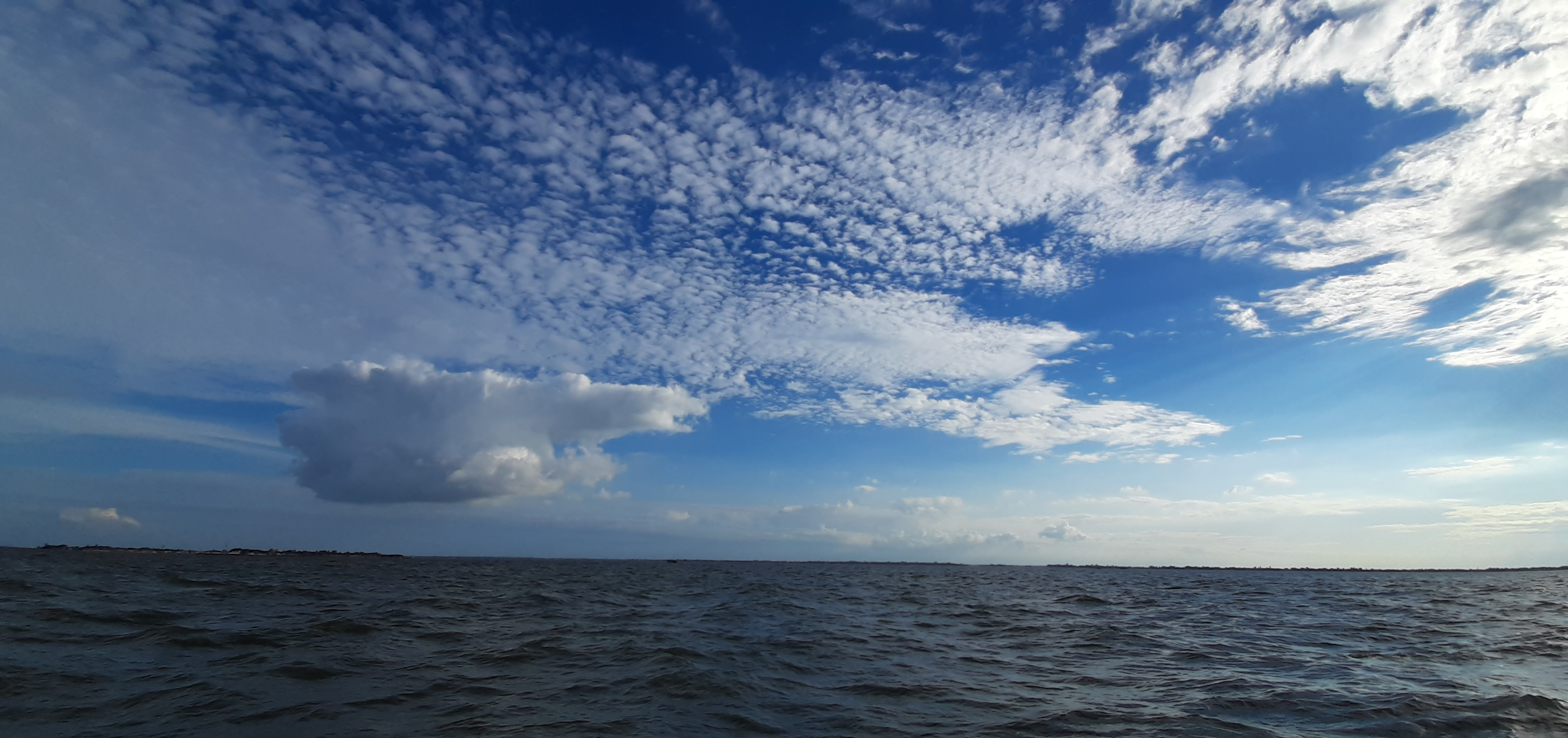
- Nikli Haor
- Interactive map of Nikli Haor
- Location: Nikli Upazila, Kishoreganj District, Bangladesh
- Type: Freshwater wetland

Nikli Haor (Bengali: নিকলি হাওর) is a wetland ecosystem located in Nikli Upazila, Kishoreganj, Bangladesh. It is about 110 km away from country's capital Dhaka. Apart from Nikli Upazila, the perimeter of this haor extends to the adjoining Mithamain, Austagram and Itna Upazilas. It is one of the largest freshwater wetlands in Bangladesh and also a popular tourist destination.

== Climate ==
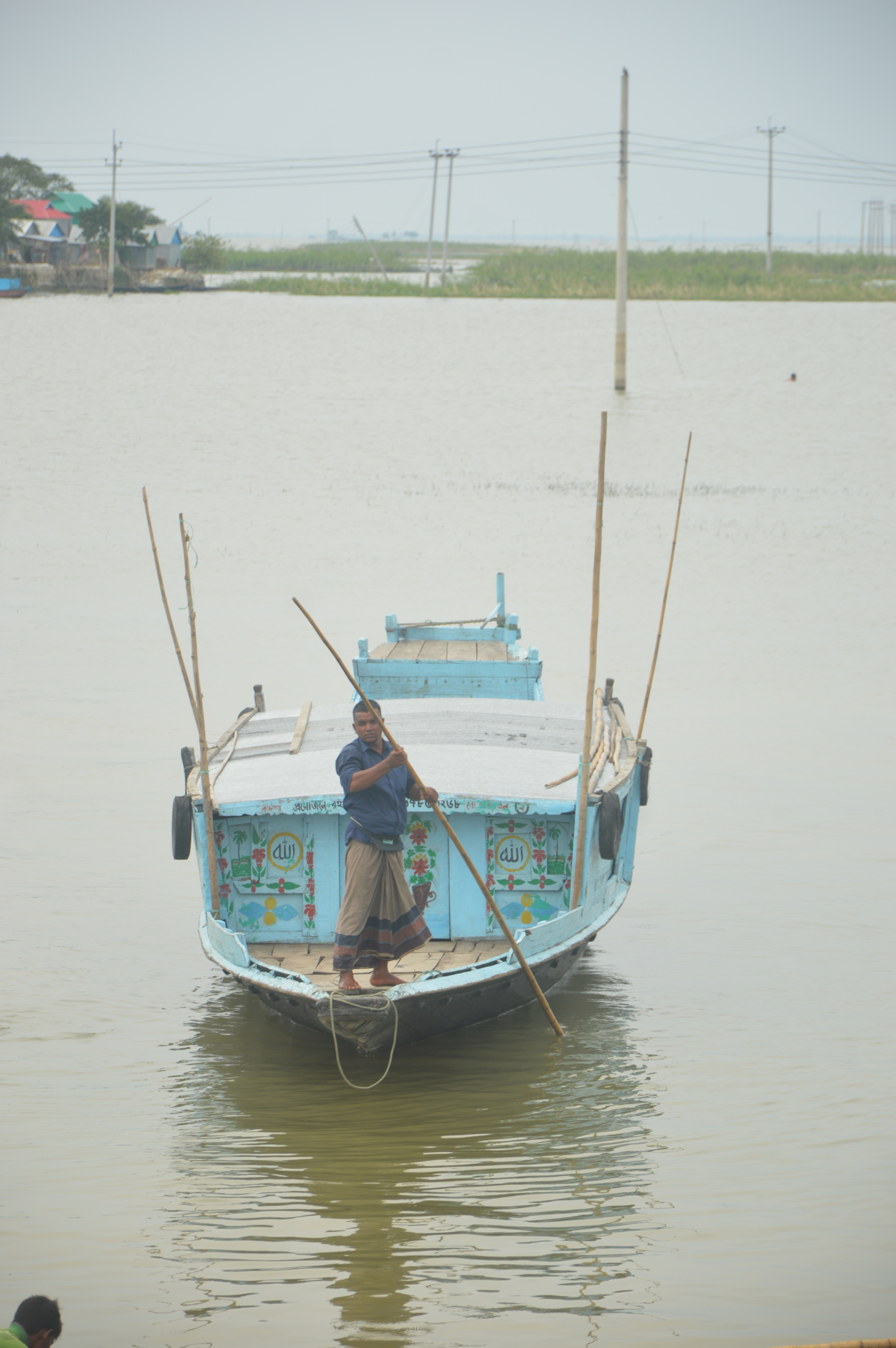
Boat from Nikli Haor

In the monsoon, when this haor is filled with water, the number of tourists increases greatly.

Most of the villages in the haor are chars (river islands).
