= Maulvi Shah Abdul Hamid =

Bengali politician and member of the Bengal Legislative Assembly

Maulvi Shah Abdul Hamid was a Bengali politician and Member of the Bengal Legislative Assembly.

== Career ==
Hamid was elected as a Member of the Bengal Legislative Assembly from the Kishoreganj North constituency in the 1937 Bengal Legislative Assembly election.

Hamid was associated with various socio-economic activities in Bengal. He was present at the opening ceremony of the Pro. Bandhu Sugar Mills Ltd., alongside prominent leaders including Premier of Bengal A. K. Fazlul Huq.
