= Bhairab Upazila =

Bhairab ভৈরব
- Upazila
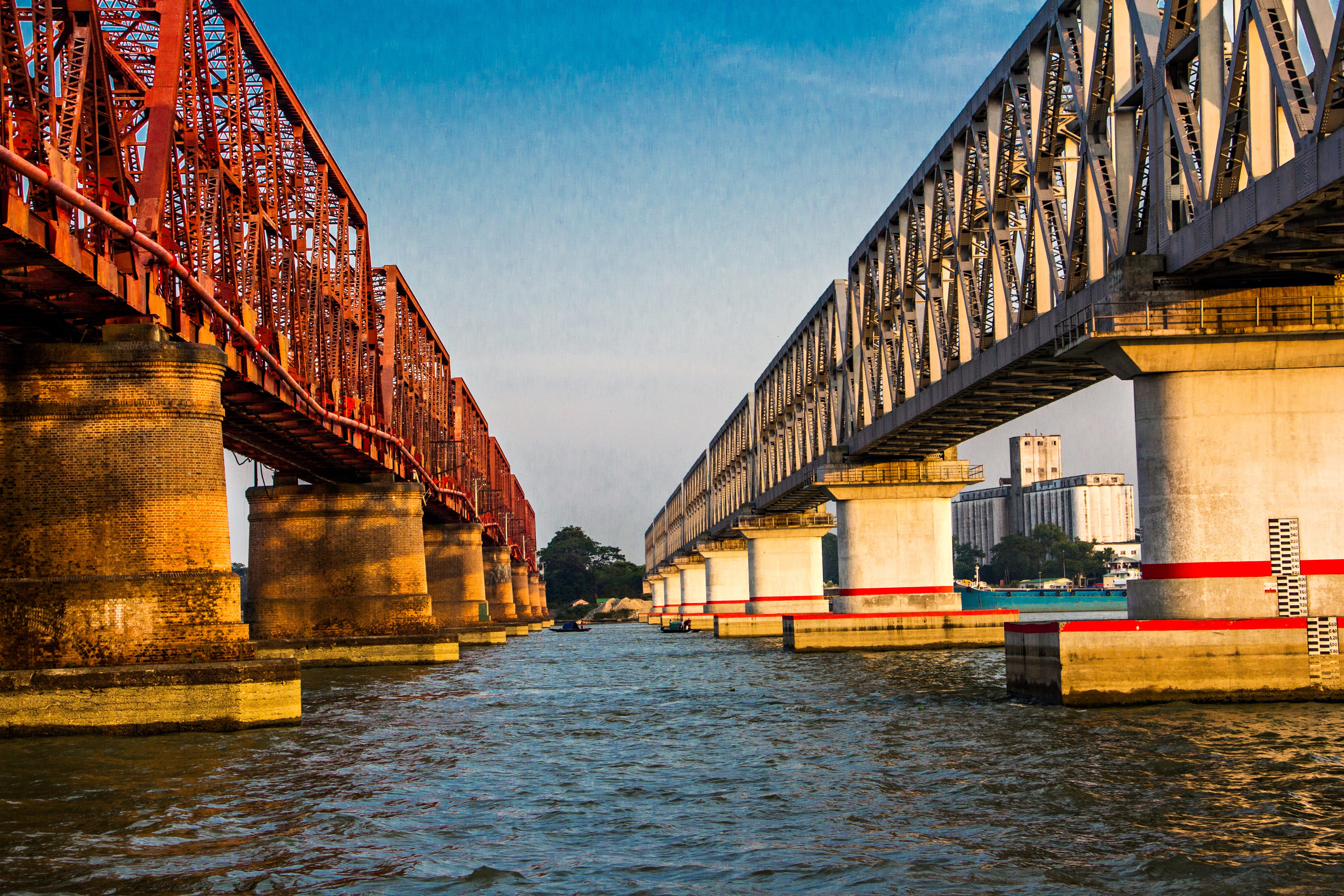
- Anderson Bridge over the Meghna River

- Coordinates: 24°3′N 90°59.3′E
- Country: Bangladesh
- Division: Dhaka
- District: Kishoreganj
- Headquarters: Bhairab

Government
  - MP (Member of Parliament): Vacant
  - UNO( Upazila Executive Officer): Israt Shadmin
  - AC Land: Md. Anisuzzaman
  - Upazila Chairman: Saidullah Miah,(Awami League) Predecessor:Gias Uddin, (Independent)
  - Mayor: Iftekhar Hossain Beno,(Awami League)

Area
  - Upazila: 139.32 km^{2} (53.79 sq mi)
  - Urban: 15.71 km^{2} (6.07 sq mi)
- Elevation: 16 m (52 ft)

Population (2022)
  - Upazila: 362,681
  - Density: 2,603.2/km^{2} (6,742.3/sq mi)
  - Urban: 156,293
  - Urban density: 9,949/km^{2} (25,770/sq mi)
- Time zone: UTC+6 (BST)
- Postal code: 2350
- Area code: 09424
- Website: bhairab.kishoreganj.gov.bd

Bhairab Upazila mauza geocode map

Bhairab (Bengali: ভৈরব) is a upazila of Kishoreganj District in the Division of Dhaka, Bangladesh. Olukanda was another name of Bhairab. The city centre of this upazila is Bhairab. As of the 2022 census, 156,297 people live in Bhairab municipality which makes this city the largest in Kishoreganj District and 28th largest city in Bangladesh.

== Geography ==
Bhairab is located at 24.0500°N 90.9875°E. It has 58,940 households and total area is 139.32 km^{2}. Bhairab is situated beside the rivers of Meghna and Brahmaputra. Bhairab Bazar (town) is notable for the Bhairab railway station and the railway bridge, Bhairab bridge that goes over the river of Meghna.

== Demographics ==
Religions in Bhairab Upazila (2022)
Religion	Percent
Islam	96.53%
Hinduism	3.46%
Other or not stated	0.01%

According to the 2022 Bangladeshi census, Bhairab Upazila had 79,871 households and a population of 362,681. 11.75% of the population were under 5 years of age. Bhairab had a literacy rate (age 7 and over) of 71.82%: 71.71% for males and 71.93% for females, and a sex ratio of 93.76 males for every 100 females. 215,608 (59.45%) lived in urban areas.

According to the 2011 Census of Bangladesh, Bhairab Upazila had 58,940 households and a population of 298,309. 86,278 (28.92%) were under 10 years of age. Bhairab had a literacy rate (age 7 and over) of 42.71%, compared to the national average of 51.8%, and a sex ratio of 1030 females per 1000 males. 118,992 (39.89%) lived in urban areas.

According to the 1991 Bangladesh census, Bhairab had a population of 192448. Males constitute 49.25% of the population, and females 50.74%. This Upazila's eighteen up population is 95,910. Bhairab has an average literacy rate of 36.23% (7+ years) where the national average is 32.4%.

== Administration ==
Bhairab was declared a Thana in 1906. Later, the thana was turned into the present-day Bhairab Upazila in 1983.

Bhairab Upazila is divided into Bhairab Municipality and seven union parishads: Aganagar, Gazaria, Kalika Prashad, Sadakpur, Shibpur, Shimulkandi, and Sreenagar. The union parishads are subdivided into 32 mauzas and 84 villages. Notably, Chagaiya stands out as one of the largest and most prominent villages in the region. Additionally, Chagaiya serves as the headquarters of Aganagar Union.

Bhairab Municipality is subdivided into 12 wards and 29 mahallas.

== Education ==
There are six colleges in the Upazila. They include three honors-level ones: Government Zillur Rahman Mohila College, Hazi Asmat Government College, founded in 1947, and Rafiqul Islam Girls' College (1987), Shahidullah Kaiser College (2010), Z. Rahman Premier Bank School and College (2013).

There is only one Government School and College – Bhairab Technical School and College(1965) to produce skilled manpower for contribution on development of national production the then-Government in 1965 established 51 Vocational Training Institutes in the whole country. With the modernization and reorganization of the vocational education system SSC (Vocational) and HSC (Vocational) program was started in 1995. To ensure the social acceptance and dignity of vocational graduates, the institute is renamed as Bhairab Technical School and College by a gazette notification from the Ministry of Education, Bangladesh. There are 64 Government Educational Institutes of this category, which are introducing the Vocational Education in the HSC level, and Bhairab Technical School and College is the only institute in the district that is offering SSC (Vocational) and HSC (Vocational) courses. Nowadays, this institute has also started Diploma Course (offering two departments, Electrical Engineering and Mechanical Engineering). There is currently a government school.

According to Banglapedia, Bhairab Government K.B. Pilot Model High School, founded in 1919, Bangladesh Railway High School, Bhairab (1954), Shahidullah Kaiser High School, Banshgari (2014), Saint Kayzer Education Home, Banshgari (2014), Kamalpur Hazi Zahir Uddin High School, Srinagar High School (1961), Bhairab M. P. Pilot Girls' High School (1962), and Kalika Prasad High School (1964), Shimul Kandi High School (1970), Sadek Pur High School (1973) are notable secondary schools.

The madrasa education system includes one fazil madrasa.

== Municipal City ==
Bhairab Municipality mahallah geocode map

Bhairab Bazaar is the urban centre of this upazila. It hosts one of the important port of Bangladesh. It is a well-known business zone of the Dhaka Division. Though it is a small city, it has a large measure of population. Almost 15,000 people per square kilometer live in this municipal city. Bhairab is mostly known for its port and fish. It is a first-class municipal city. Bhairab Bridge connects Dhaka and Chattogram Divisions of Bangladesh. It is the second-largest Bridge of Bangladesh after Hardinge Bridge. Besides, Bhairab has two other important bridges Syed Nazrul Islam Bridge and Zillur Rahman Railway Bridge.

- Bhairabpur
- New Town
- Chandiber
- Bhairab Bazar
- Komolpur
- Jagannathpur
- Amlapara
- Ghorakanda
- Tatarkandi
- Kalipur
- Sadekpur
- Aganagor

== Notable residents ==
- Zillur Rahman, President of Bangladesh (2009-2013), was born in Bhairab in 1929.
- Ivy Rahman, prominent politician, was born in Bhairab on 7 July 1934
- Nazmul Hassan Papon, President of Bangladesh Cricket Board

== See also ==
- Upazilas of Bangladesh
- Districts of Bangladesh
- Divisions of Bangladesh
