= List of mosques in Dhaka Division =

List of mosques of Dhaka Division:

== Kishoreganj district ==
- Guroi Shahi Mosque
- Saheb Bari Jame Masjid
- Shah Mohammad Mosque
- Qutb Mosque

== Tangail district ==
- Atia Mosque
- Kadimhamjani Mosque
- Rajbari Mosque
- Dhanbari Mosque
- Dhalapara Jame Mosque

== Dhaka district ==
- Baitul Mukarram National Mosque
- Binat Bibi Mosque
- Sunnati Jame Mosque
- Chawk Mosque
- Kakrail Mosque
- Khan Mohammad Mridha Mosque
- Sat Gambuj Mosque
- Churihatta Mosque
- Star Mosque
- Kartalab Khan Mosque
- Musa Khan Mosque
- Lalbagh Shahi Mosque
- Shaista Khan Mosque

== Narayanganj district ==
- Asrafia Jame Mosque
- Goaldi Mosque

== Munshiganj district ==
- Baba Adam's Mosque

== Rajbari district ==
- Pangsha Government College Mosque
- Lakshandia Baitullah Jame Mosque
- Pangsha Upazila Mosque
- Machpara Jame Mosque
- Garal Jame Mosque
