= Tarail Upazila =

Tarail তারাইল
- Upazila
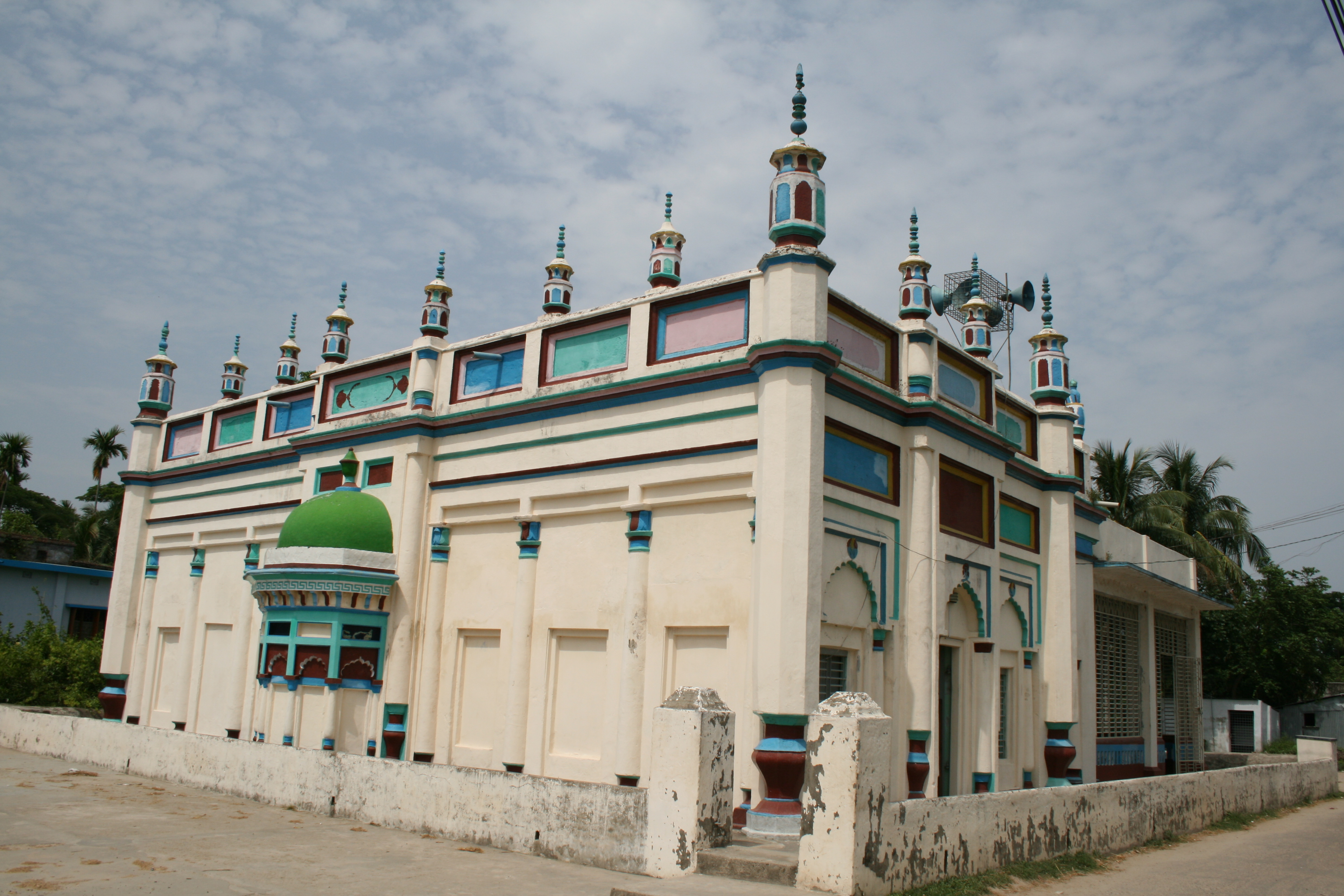
- Saheb Bari Jame Masjid

- Coordinates: 24°32.3′N 90°52.5′E
- Country: Bangladesh
- Division: Dhaka
- District: Kishoreganj

Area
  - Total: 141.43 km^{2} (54.61 sq mi)

Population (2022)
  - Total: 170,085
  - Density: 1,202.6/km^{2} (3,114.7/sq mi)
- Time zone: UTC+6 (BST)
- Postal code: 2316
- Area code: 0941
- Website: Official Map of Tarail

Tarail Upazila mauza geocode map

Tarail (Bengali: তারাইল) is an upazila of Kishoreganj District in the division of Dhaka, Bangladesh.

== Geography ==
Tarail is located at 24.5375°N 90.8750°E. It has a total area of 141.43 km^{2}.

== Demographics ==
Religions in Tarail Upazila (2022)
Religion	Percent
Islam	95.93%
Hinduism	4.06%
Other or not stated	0.01%

According to the 2022 Bangladeshi census, Tarail Upazila had 40,336 households and a population of 170,085. 11.96% of the population were under 5 years of age. Tarail had a literacy rate (age 7 and over) of 63.18%: 63.06% for males and 63.30% for females, and a sex ratio of 94.28 males for every 100 females. 27,633 (16.25%) lived in urban areas.

According to the 2011 Census of Bangladesh, Tarail Upazila had 34,592 households and a population of 159,739. 46,504 (29.11%) were under 10 years of age. Tarail had a literacy rate (age 7 and over) of 35.72%, compared to the national average of 51.8%, and a sex ratio of 1017 females per 1000 males. 8,675 (5.43%) lived in urban areas.

As of the 1991 Bangladesh census, Tarail has a population of 138488. Males constitute 50.41% of the population, and females 49.59%. This Upazila's eighteen up population is 62143. Tarail has an average literacy rate of 17.5% (7+ years), and the national average of 32.4% literate.

== Administration ==
Tarail Upazila is divided into Tarail Municipality and seven union parishads: Damiha, Dhala, Digdair, Jawar, Rauti, Talganga, and Tarail Sachail. The union parishads are subdivided into 75 mauzas and 116 villages.

== Notable people ==
- Nur Khan of Bengal

== See also ==
- Upazilas of Bangladesh
- Districts of Bangladesh
- Divisions of Bangladesh
