= Nikli Upazila =

Nikli নিকলি
- Upazila
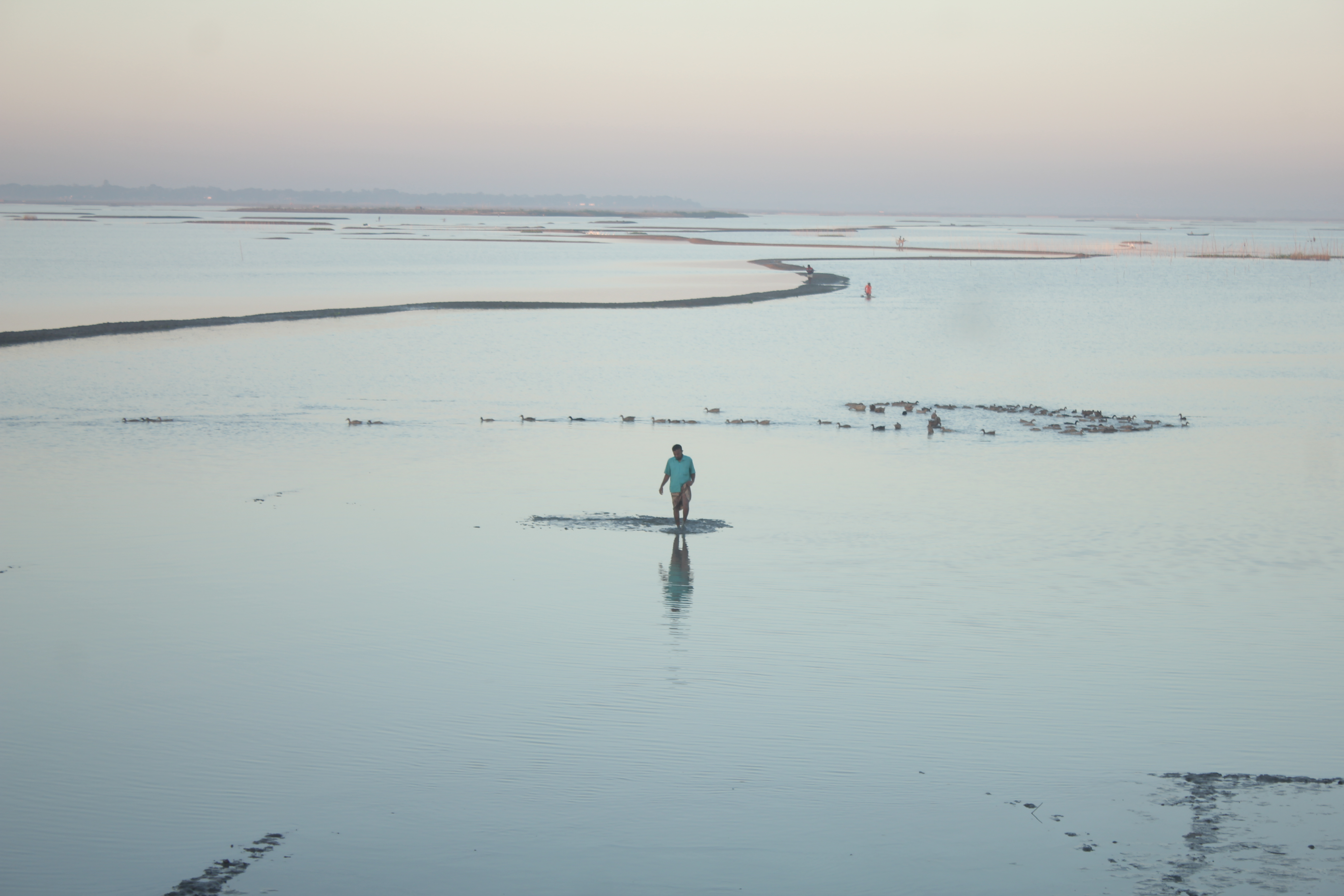
- Nikli Haor

- Coordinates: 24°19′N 90°56′E
- Country: Bangladesh
- Division: Dhaka
- District: Kishoreganj

Area
  - Total: 214.39 km^{2} (82.78 sq mi)

Population (2022)
  - Total: 145,887
  - Density: 680.47/km^{2} (1,762.4/sq mi)
- Time zone: UTC+6 (BST)
- Postal code: 2360
- Website: Official Map of Nikli

Nikli Upazila mauza geocode map

Nikli (Bengali: নিকলি) is an upazila of Kishoreganj District in the Division of Dhaka, Bangladesh.

== Geography ==
Nikli is located at 24.3167°N 90.9333°E. It has 30,450 households and total area 214.39 km^{2}.

== Demographics ==
Religions in Nikli Upazila (2022)
| Religion | Percent |
| Islam | 95.87% |
| Hinduism | 4.13% |
| Other or not stated | 0.003% |

According to the 2022 Bangladeshi census, Nikli Upazila had 33,773 households and a population of 145,887. 11.83% of the population were under 5 years of age. Nikli had a literacy rate (age 7 and over) of 59.28%: 60.19% for males and 58.42% for females, and a sex ratio of 96.71 males for every 100 females. 49,924 (34.22%) lived in urban areas.

According to the 2011 Census of Bangladesh, Nikli Upazila had 30,450 households and a population of 133,729. 39,457 (29.51%) were under 10 years of age. Nikli had a literacy rate (age 7 and over) of 28.87%, compared to the national average of 51.8%, and a sex ratio of 996 females per 1000 males. 18,924 (14.15%) lived in urban areas.

As of the 1991 Bangladesh census, Nikli has a population of 110,912. Males constitute 50.16% of the population, and females 49.84%. This Upazila's eighteen up population is 54,437. Nikli has an average literacy rate of 12.6% (7+ years), and the national average of 32.4% literate.

== Administration ==
Nikli Upazila is divided into seven union parishads: Chatir Char, Dampara, Gurai, Jaraitala, Karpasha, Nikli, and Singpur. The union parishads are subdivided into 46 mauzas and 125 villages.

== See also ==
- Upazilas of Bangladesh
- Districts of Bangladesh
- Divisions of Bangladesh
