= Kishoreganj District =

District in Mymensingh Division, Bangladesh

Kishoreganj District কিশোরগঞ্জ জেলা
- District of Bangladesh
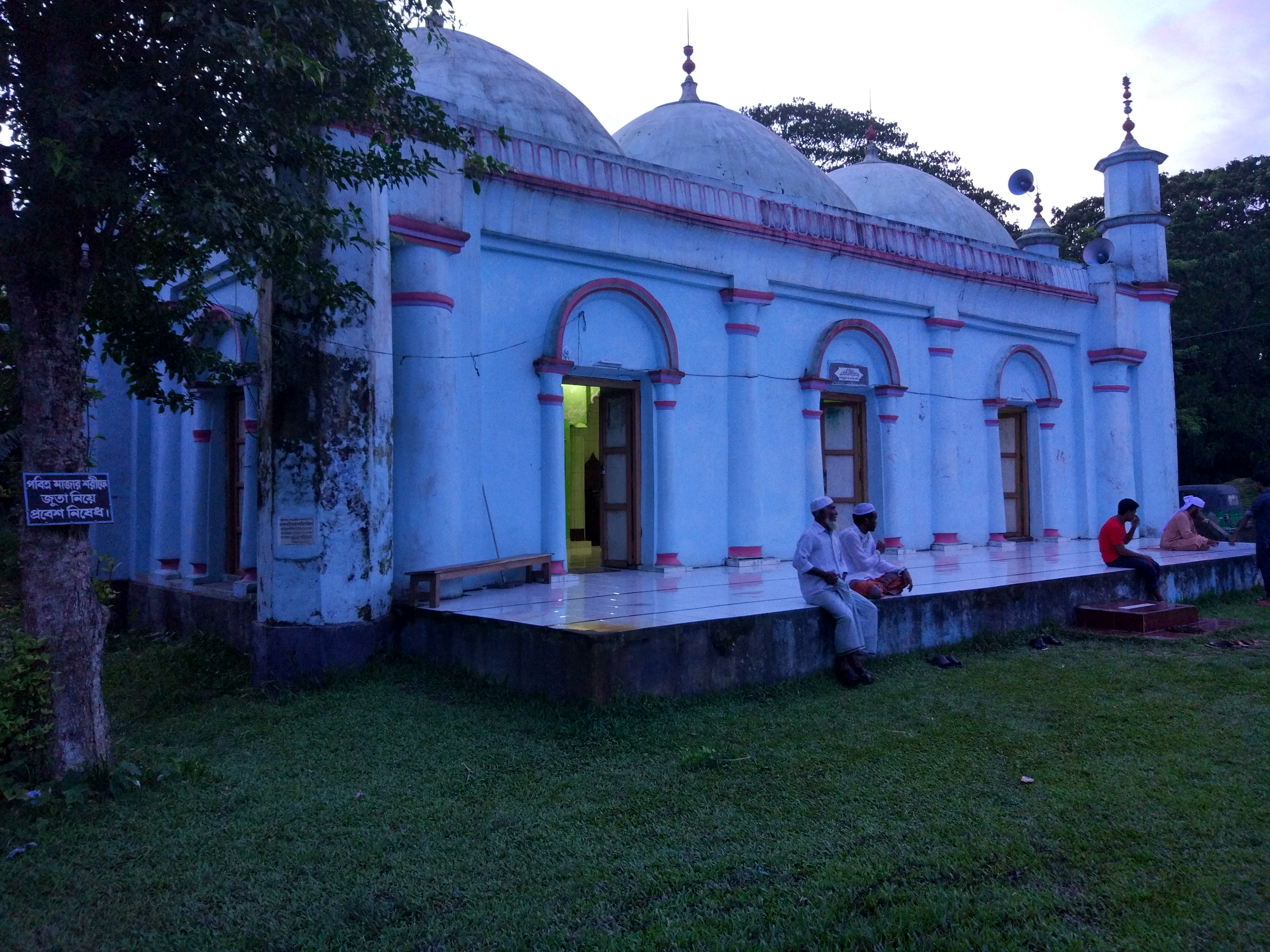
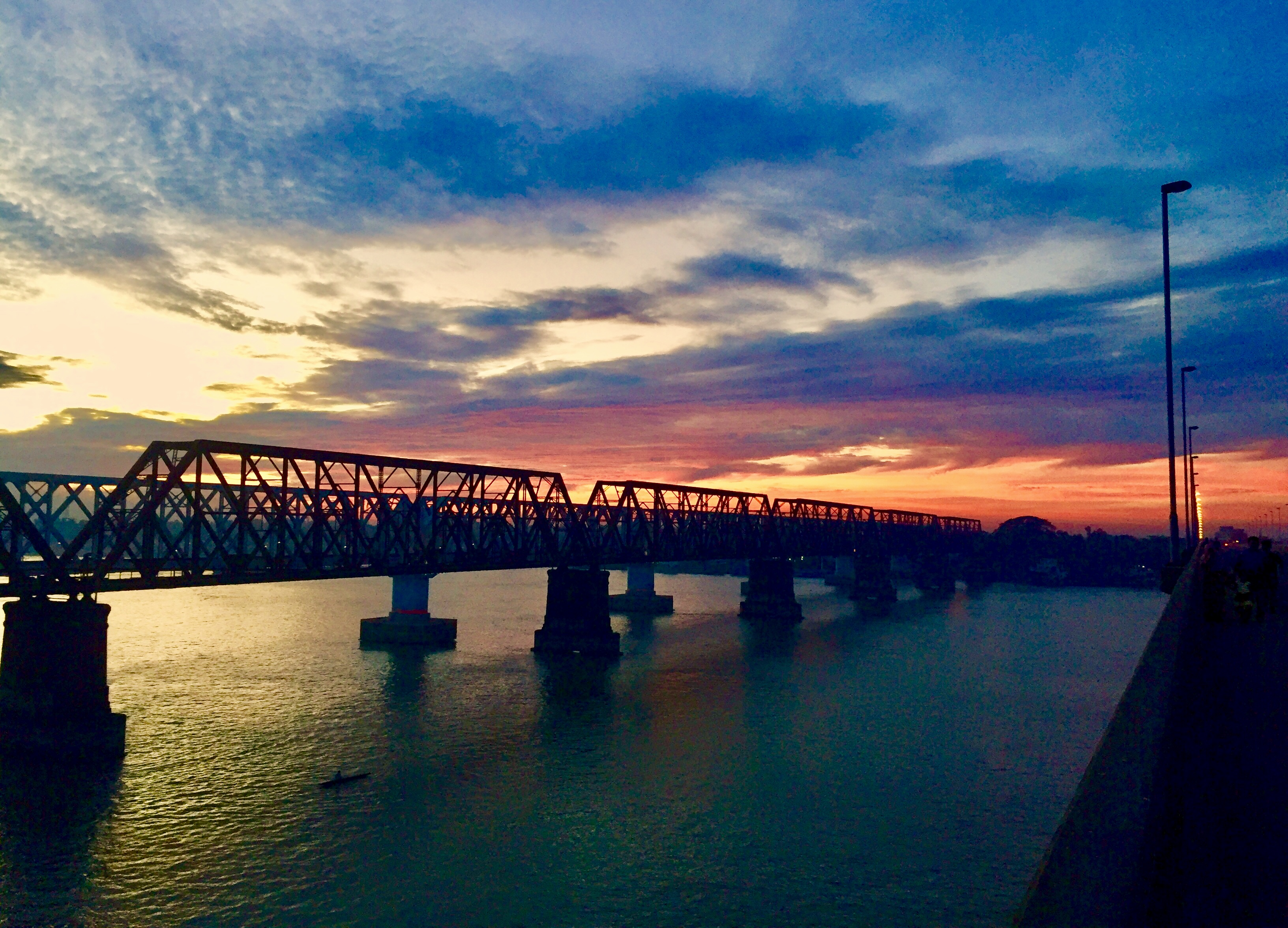
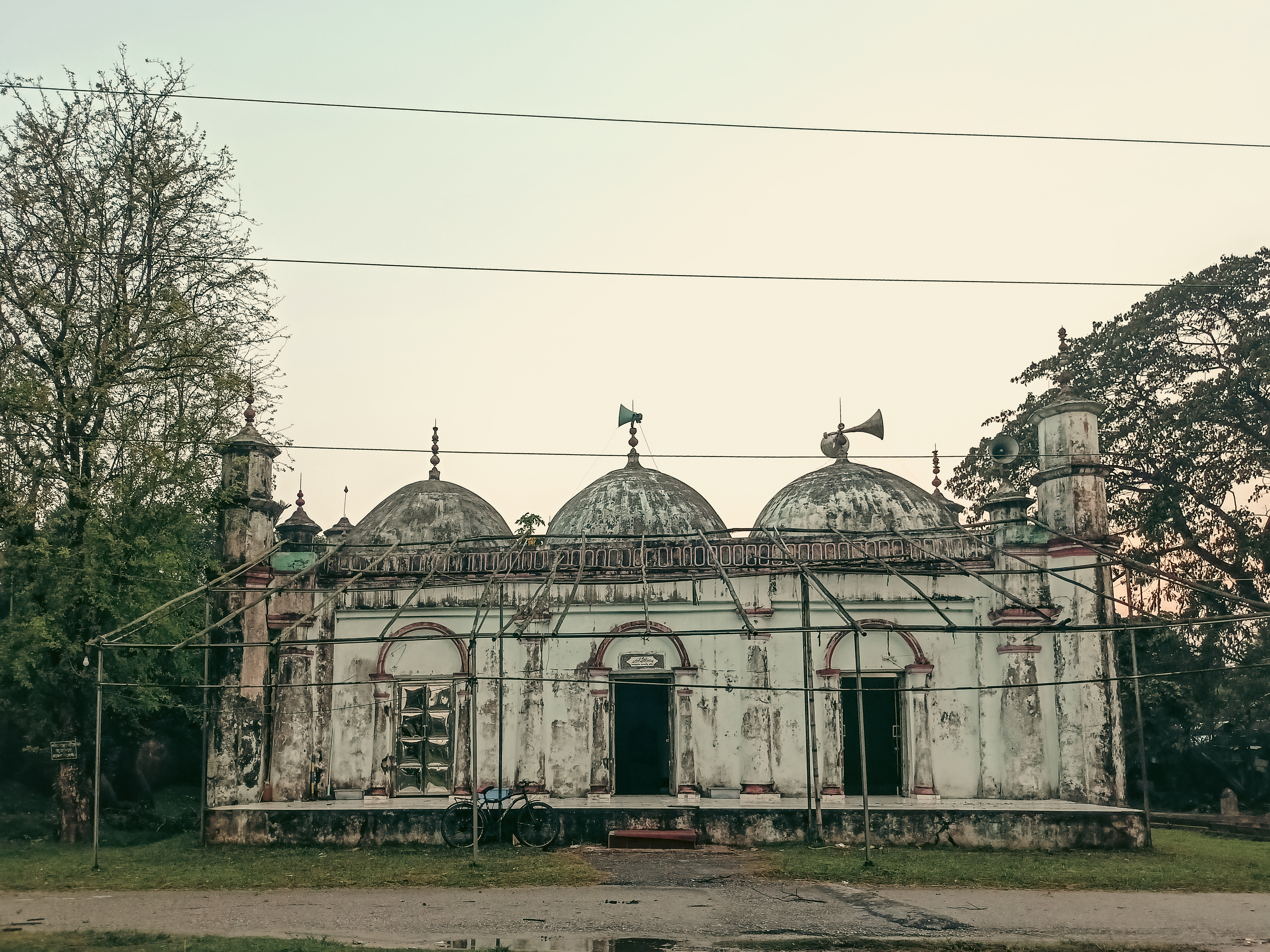
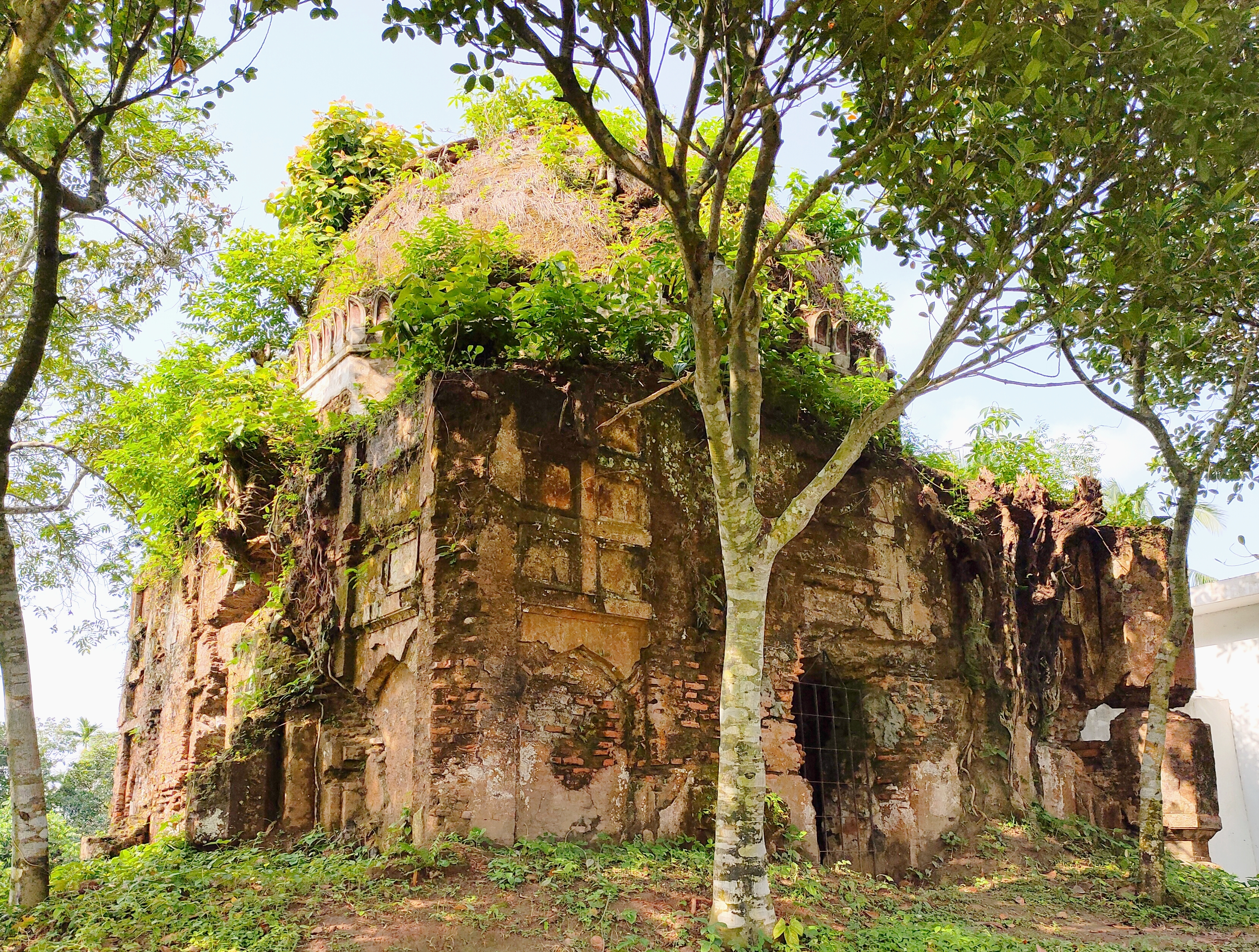
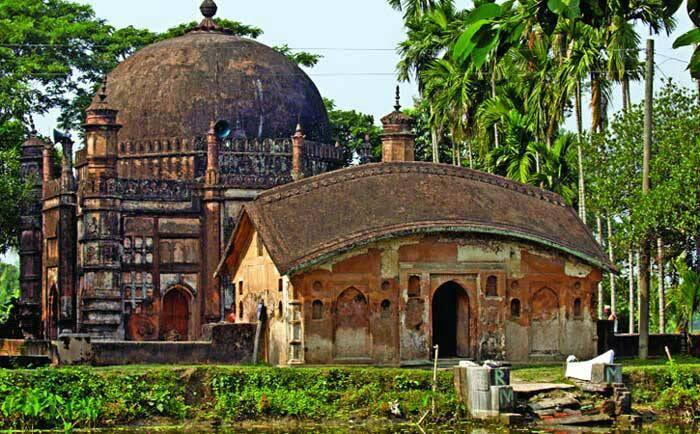
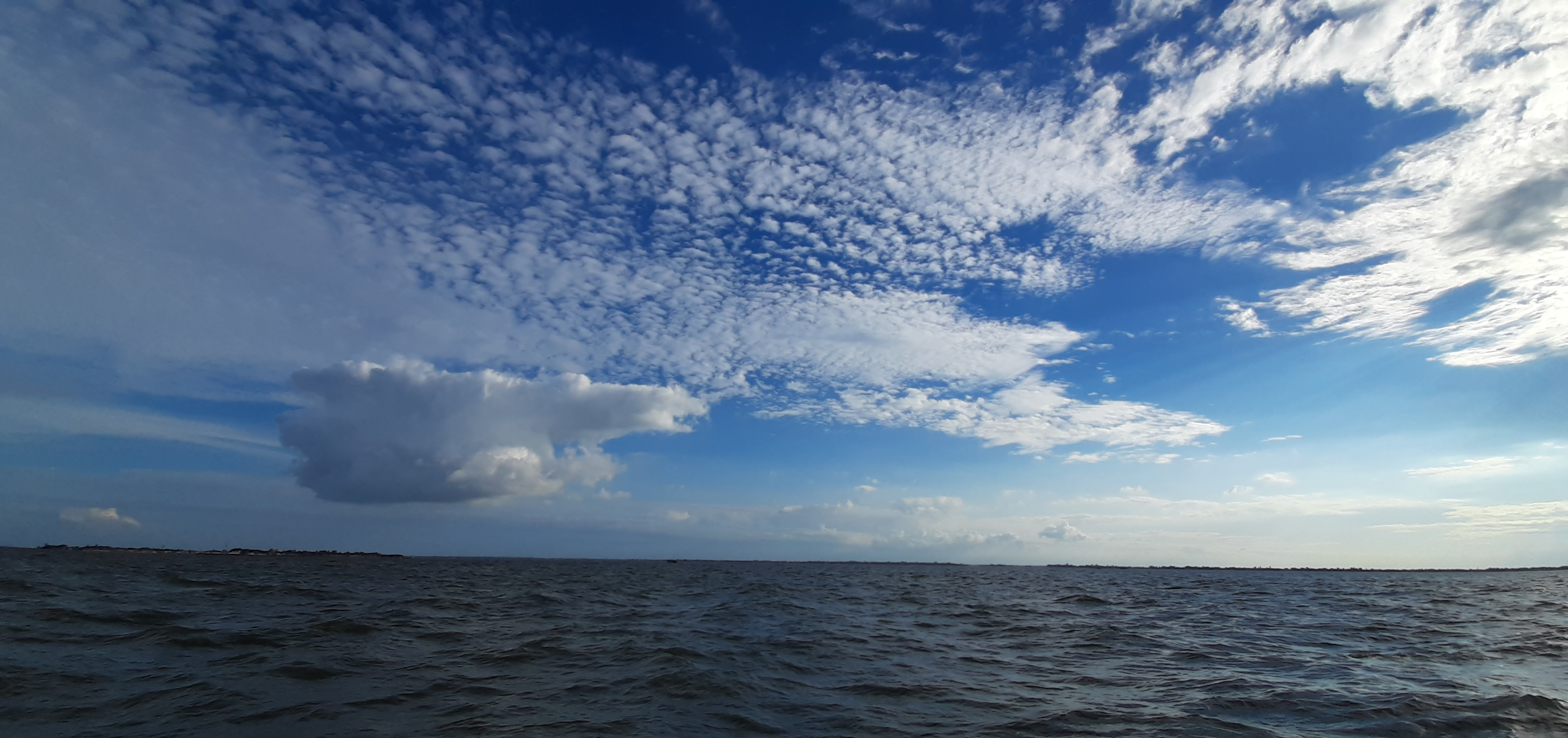
- Clockwise from top-left: Mosque at Jangalbari Fort, Egarosindur, Nikli Haor, Aurangzeb Mosque, Syed Nazrul Islam bridge

- Location of Kishoreganj in Bangladesh
- Interactive map of Kishoreganj District
- Coordinates: 24°26′N 90°47′E
- Country: Bangladesh
- Division: Dhaka
- Headquarters: Kishoreganj

Government
  - District Council Chairman: Khaled Saifullah khan sohel (Bangladesh Nationalist Party)
  - Deputy Commissioner: Sohana Nasrin
  - Chief Executive Officer: Muhammad Abdullah

Area
  - Total: 2,688.53 km^{2} (1,038.05 sq mi)

Population (2022)
  - Total: 3,267,626
  - Density: 1,215.40/km^{2} (3,147.86/sq mi)
- Demonym(s): Kishoreganji, Kishoregonji
- Time zone: UTC+06:00 (BST)
- Postal code: 2300
- Area code: 0941
- ISO 3166 code: BD-26
- HDI (2018): 0.562 medium · 19th of 21
- Website: www.kishoreganj.gov.bd

Kishoreganj District (Bengali: কিশোরগঞ্জ জেলা) is a district in Dhaka Division, Bangladesh. The establishment of the Kishorganj began with 2495.07 km^{2} of land requisition from Mymensingh district to form Kishoreganj District. Earlier it was a mahakuma (sub-division) under Mymensingh district. Kishorganj consists of Ten municipalities, 13 upazilas, 105 union parishads, 39 wards, 145 mahallas, 946 mouzas, and 1775 villages.

== History ==
The history of Kishoreganj dates from ancient times. The village of Egarosindur in Pakundia Upazila has evidence of trade with distant foreign countries dating back at least 2500 years. Historically, the region of Kishoreganj has been seen as forming the southern boundary of Kamarupa. It was part of the Pala and Sena empires, and after their fall, it was mainly administered by a large number of petty Koch and Barman chieftains.

These chieftains were nominally subject to the Bengal Sultans, but were never fully conquered. However, eventually these chieftains were conquered by the Mughals, with Egarosindur being conquered in 1538. In 1580, Isa Khan defeated the Koch chieftain of Jangalbari and took over the entirety of Kishoreganj in his domain. From this fort, he resisted Mughal domination of Bengal. After his death and his son's surrender, most of the present-day Kishoreganj district formed part of Musa Khan's domain. Other parts of the district became part of various zamindaris. One of these Zamindars, Nand Kishore Pramanik, gave the land for a town that became Kishoreganj. The region became part of the Sonargaon Sarkar of the Bengal Subah. After the British conquest of Bengal Kishoreganj became part of the Mymensingh district. It gained separate district status in 1984.

== Geography ==
Kishoreganj district is situated in the northeastern part of Bangladesh in the Dhaka Division. It adjoins Sunamganj and Habiganj districts to the east, Brahmanbaria District to the southeast, Narsingdi District to the southwest, Mymensingh District to the west and northwest, and Netrokona District to the north.

The district is covered almost entirely in agricultural land. The western part of the district is composed primarily of alluvial silt and clay deposits with a few beels. The eastern part of the district lies in a shallow basin composed of marshy clay and peat. The region is composed of haors, which flood during the monsoon to cover the entire basin. Parts of the region lie underwater for the majority of the year.

=== Rivers ===
Kishoreganj district has several rivers. The most important of these rivers is the Meghna, which forms from the merging of the Surma and Kushiyara rivers. The Meghna forms near the village of Dilalpur in Bajitpur Upazila at the border between Kishoreganj and Brahmanbaria districts, leaving the district at the town of Bhairab Bazar where it is joined by the Old Brahmaputra.

The Brahmaputra, sometimes called the Old Brahmaputra, forms part of the border with Mymensingh district before entering at border between Kishoreganj and Narsingdi districts. It forms the majority of the border between the two districts, except for a small portion in the middle of the border, and enters the Meghna at Bhairab Bazar.

The Surma, known locally as the Danu, is a river flowing through the Haor region. It enters Kishoreganj district from Netrokona district near the village of Dhanpur in Itna Upazila and flows southwest before splitting into two branches. These two branches flow south and then west, and west and then south respectively, rejoining near Shingpur in Nikli Upazila. From this point, the river is known as Ghorautra. The Ghorautra then meanders southwest, before turning slightly to flow south and joins the Kalni, near the village of Dilalpur, to form the Meghna.

The Kushiyara river enters the district after forming part of the border with Habiganj district, and is known locally as the Kalni. The river leaves the district briefly and reenters in Mithamain Upazila. It flows south through Mithamain and Ashtagram upazilas before forming the border with Brahmanbaria district. It flows southwest, forming the border between the two districts before merging with the Ghorautra to form the Meghna.

The Narsunda river is a tributary of the Brahmaputra, which flows through Kishoreganj city. It enters from the north from Mymensingh district and splits into two directions: one flowing east towards the Danu, the other flowing south through Kishoreganj into the Brahmaputra.

Main depressions

- Humaipur (Bajitpur)
- Somai (Nikli)
- Barir (Mithamain)
- Surma Baula (Nikli)
- Tallar Haors (Nikli-Bajitpur-Austagram).

== Demographics ==
Historical population
Year	Pop.	±% p.a.
1974	1,576,504	—
1981	1,895,153	+2.66%
1991	2,306,079	+1.98%
2001	2,594,954	+1.19%
2011	2,911,907	+1.16%
2022	3,267,626	+1.05%

According to the 2022 Census of Bangladesh, Kishoreganj District had 760,952 households and a population of 3,267,626 with an average 4.25 people per household. Among the population, 520,051 (22.14%) inhabitants were under 10 years of age. The population density was 1,215 people per km^{2}. Kishoreganj District had a literacy rate (age 7 and over) of 67.60%, compared to the national average of 74.80%, and a sex ratio of 1077 females per 1000 males. Approximately, 27.41% of the population lived in urban areas. The ethnic population was 1,022.

=== Religion ===
Religions in Kishoreganj District (2022)
Religion	Percent
Islam	95.13%
Hinduism	4.86%
Other or not stated	0.01%

Religion in present-day Kishoreganj District (Note: Kishoreganj subdivision of Mymensingh district)
Religion	1941		1981		1991		2001		2011		2022	
Religion	Pop.	%	Pop.	%	Pop.	%	Pop.	%	Pop.	%	Pop.	%
Islam	886,528	77.74%	1,742,762	91.96%	2,134,408	92.56%	2,432,664	93.75%	2,752,007	94.51%	3,108,432	95.13%
Hinduism	253,781	22.25%	150,470	7.94%	157,482	6.83%	160,492	6.18%	158,538	5.44%	158,778	4.86%
Others (Note: Including Jainism, Christianity, Buddhism, Zoroastrianism, Judaism, Ad-Dharmis, or not stated)	136	0.01%	1,921	0.10%	14,189	0.61%	1,798	0.07%	1,362	0.05%	416	0.01%
Total Population	1,140,445	100%	1,895,153	100%	2,306,079	100%	2,594,954	100%	2,911,907	100%	3,267,626	100%

Kishoreganj contains 3,980 mosques, 530 temples and seven churches. The majority of its residents are Muslim, while the Hindu population has remained constant over time. Hindus are concentrated primarily in the Haor areas and are mostly from fishing/boating communities such as the Kaibartas.

== Places of interest ==
Kishoreganj District is a place of Islam and Hinduism. The Meghna and Brahmaputra rivers have contributed to its development. Many traditional events are observed every year, including Kurikhai Mela, a celebrated shrine-oriented festival held every year on the last Monday of the month of Magh at the shrine in Katiadi thana. The notable Shamsuddin Aulia, one of the figures of Hajrat Shahjalal, died there.

=== Jangalbari Fort ===
Jangalbari Fort is in the Jangalbari village of Karimganj Upazila. It was once a strong outpost of the Bengal Ruler Isa Khan, who erected several structures inside the fort area. It was severely damaged by the great earthquake in 1897. Isa Khan's descendants still live in the village, and currently Isa Khan's 14th descendant, Dewan Amin Dau Khan, lives in the fort.

=== Egarosindur ===
Egarosindur (Bengali: এগারসিন্ধুর) is a village in Pakundia Upazila, Kishoreganj. The village is situated on the east side of the river Brahmaputra. The name of this village is found in the Akbornama by the historian Abul Fazal. There is a debate among historians about the history of Egarosindur. Some engraved silver coins, iron-axes, lances and bows and arrows were discovered there presumed to be from the 10th century BC. Historians also believe that Egarosindur was inhabited since 1000 BC, i.e. the time of the Murza. There lived many tribals named Koch and Hajong. Egarosindur was a centre of trade and commerce.

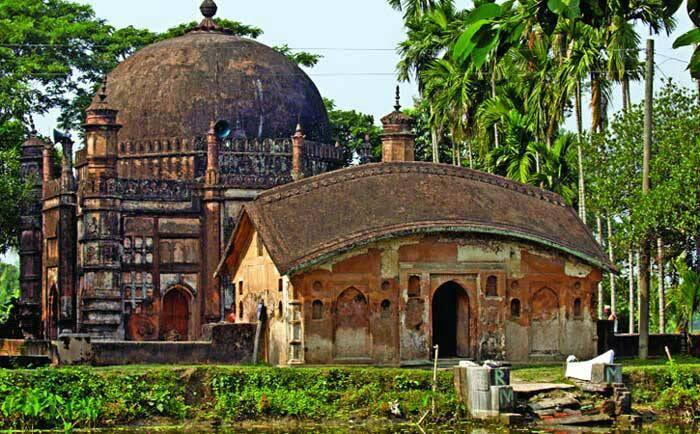
Egarosindur

In 380 AD, Egarosindur was under the reign of Dobak state. After that this region was reigned by the King of Kamarupa. Another historical analyses prove that in the 8th century Egarosindur was an important river port where Muslim traders exported and imported their product with Rome and Paris. In the 10th century Egarosindur was under the control of Azhaba, a king of Hazradi. Azbaha triumph over this land by defeating King Botong. But after some years Azbaha was beaten by Bebuid Raza and Bebuid Raza was the first popular king of this land. In his time, Egarosindur was reborn again. He built spectacular palaces, forts, big canals, temples etc.

In the second part of the 10th century King Srishochandra controlled this land. After that this area might be governed by Shen king and then it is included with the land of Kamarupa. In the beginning of the 14th century the king of Gaur, Firoz Shah succeed to win Egarosindur. In 1338 Sultan Fakruddin Mubarak Shah took control over this ancient land. It was seen that when the Sultan was in a critical position, he took shelter in Egarosindur. In 1577 Isa Khan declared Egarosindur a sovereign state. In his age this place appeared as a remarkable place of trade and commerce. In the fort of Egarosindur there held a massive battle between Isa Khan and Mansingh, the general of Akbar. But in the battlefield Mansingh was greatly impressed by the boldness and hospitality of Isa Khan. In one stage when they carried out a duel, Mansingh's sword broke down. Isa Khan did not take his life and most surprisingly he offered his own sword to Mansingh. He said, "I could not kill any helpless person". And then they made an agreement in the battlefield. Akbar granted Isa Khan a jaigir lease over 22 parganas. After Isa Khan, Egarosindur as a distinct entity was again lost to history. In the reign of Shahjahan in 1638, the king of Assam attacked Egarosindur. Though he was not competent to defeat the warrior of Shahjahan, he destroyed this land ruthlessly when he fled from the battlefield.

=== Shah Mahmud Mosque ===
It is an attractive building at Egarosindur may be dated sometime around 1680 AD. The mosque stands at the back of a slightly raised platform, which is enclosed by a low wall with a gateway consists of an oblong structure with do-chala roof. The mosque proper is a square structure, 5.79 m (19.0 ft) a side in the inside, and is emphasized with octagonal towers on the four exteriors angles. All these towers shooting high above the roof and terminating in solid kiosks with cupolas, were originally crowned with kalasa finials, still intact in the southern one. The western wall accommodates inside three mihrab –the central one semi –octagonal and the side ones rectangular. The central doorway and central mihrab are larger than their flanking counterparts. The mosque has four axially projected frontones, each corresponding to the centrally located doorways and the central mihrab. The parapets and cornices are horizontal in the usual Mughal fashion.

All the mihrabs are enriched with terracotta decoration. The mihrabs are arched having cuspings in their outer faces. The pilasters, supporting the mihrab arches, show a series of decorated bands topped by a frieze of petals. The spandrels of these arches, though now plain must have been originally enriched with terracotta plaques. Above the rectangular frame of the central mihrab there is a row of arched-niches filled with varieties of small trees containing flowers. The mosque should specially be noted for its four axially projected frontons with bordering ornamental turrets, a device which must have been borrowed from the four axial iwan-type gateways of the Persian influenced north Indian Mughal standard mosques of Fathpur, Agra and Delhi.

=== Sadi Mosque ===
Another structure of Egarosindur is one of the best-conserved monuments in the country. A pertain inscription tablet, fixed over the central mihrab, record that the mosque was built in 1062 AH (1652 AD) by one Sadi, son of Shaikh Shiroo, during the reign of Shahjahan.

Measuring 25 ft a side, the single-domed square mosque was built on a raised piece of land. There are three arched entrances in the east, and one each in the middle of the north and the south sides. The central archway, which is larger, is set within a slightly projected rectangular frame, but the flanking archways are contained within slightly recessed rectangle. The qibla wall is recessed with three semi-octagonal mihrabs, which correspond to the three eastern doorways. The mosque represents a happy blending of Mughal elements with the Sultanate architectural traits characteristic of Bengal.

=== Fort of Isha Khan ===
The remains of the fort are still visible near the site of the Sadi mosque. In this fort Isha Khan fought against Man Singh, the general of Akbar. Recently some valuable antiques have been found in this place, which attest to the important history of this place.

=== Mazar (graveyard) Sharif ===
In Egarosindur, many religious leaders came to invite people into Islam. Some of them named - Borapirer Mazar (Shah Moize uddin Shah Mannunun of Sholakia Shaheb barii, Samsuddin Bokhari, Fakir Garibullah Shah, Syed Ahmed Rumi, Nigrin shah and so on. Their mazars are situated in this village. The Mazar of Garibullah shah is in a higher position. People treat their Mazar with respect. It has been considered as a pleasure that there are no superstitions and fanatic activities because the villagers are conscious about this matter.

=== Samsuddin Bokhari ===
The Mazar of Samsuddin Bokhari is situated at Kurikhai, Katiadi, Kishoreganj. It is a historical place of kishoreganj district. Samsuddin Bokhari was a tour companion of Shahjalal. They came together. Samsuddin Bokhari Mazar's also known as Kurikhai Mazar. The fair is held here every year to mark the death anniversary of Shamsuddin Bokhari. The fair is according to the Bengali calendar. The fair started from the second last Monday of the Magh month of Bangla year, and it continues till the following Monday (last Monday of the month). Botanical Garden located by the bank of the river Meghna.

=== Fairy tales ===
As it is an ancient place, there are many fairy tales which have become popular in this village. There are tales about the big pond of Bebuid Raza and his wife, two canon of Isa Khan and so on.

Poet Chandravati Shiv Mandir

The Chandravati Shiv Mondir (Temple) built at Katcharipara about 8 kilometres off Kishoreganj town by Deeja Bongshi Das during the later part of the 16th century is still adorned with its artistic structural workmanship which attracts the tourists of different areas.

== Administration ==
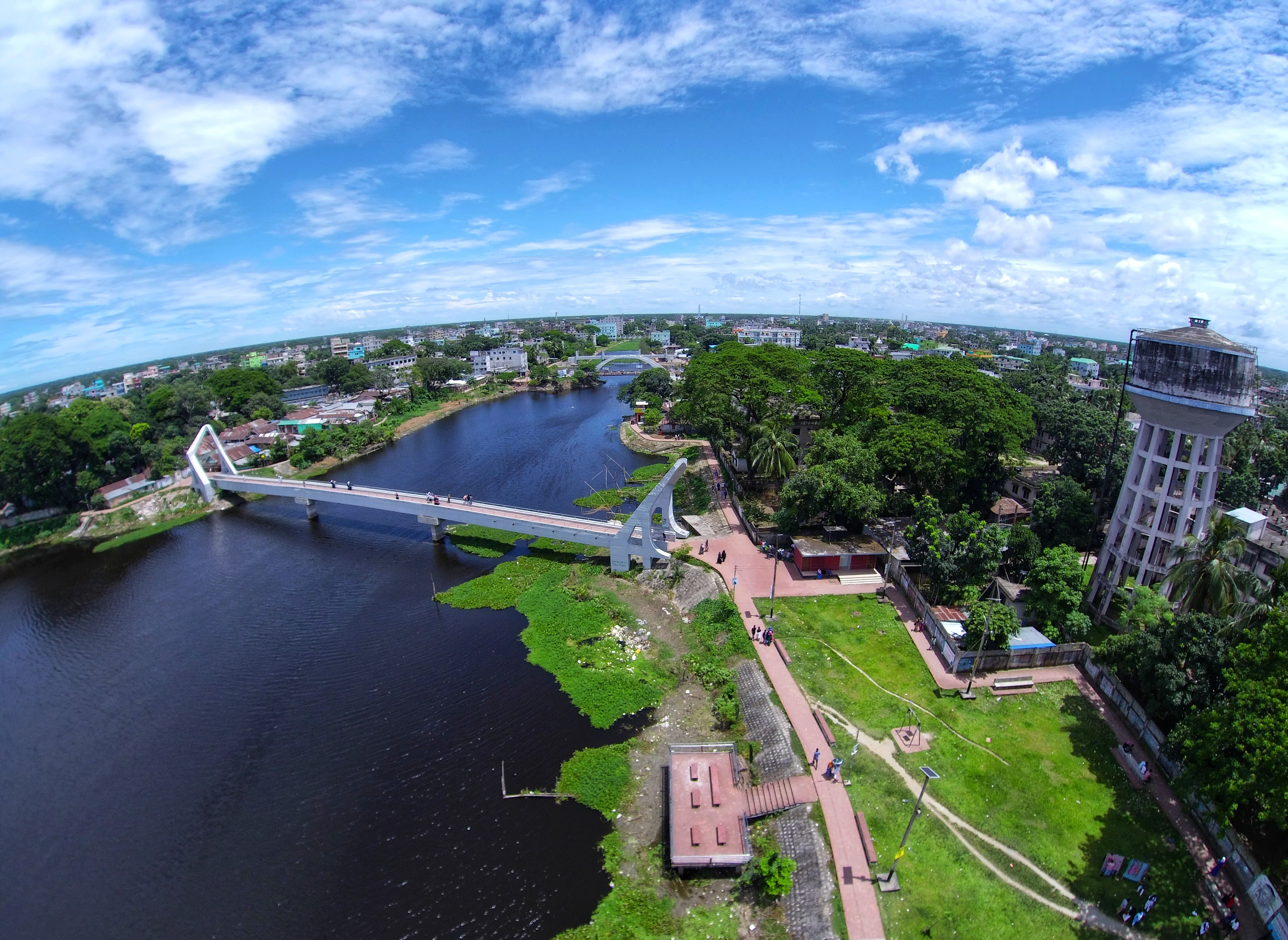
Narasunda River Lake View Of Kishoreganj City

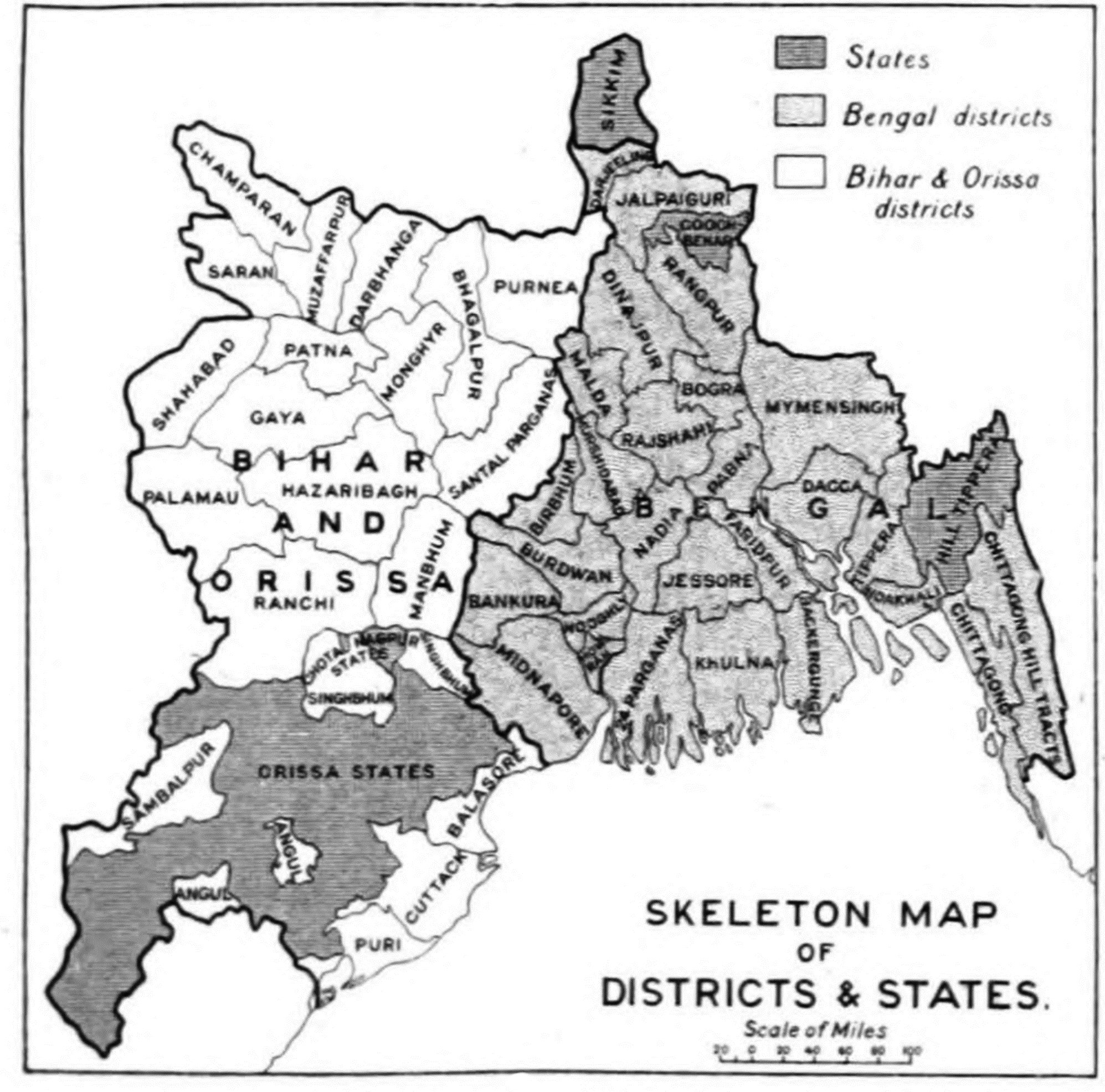
Provincial Map of Bengal showing Greater Mymensingh Area (present Division with Tangail and Kishoreganj) in 1917

- Deputy Commissioner: Md Sarwar Murshed Chowdhury
- Additional Deputy Commissioner (Overall): Tarfdar Md. Aktar Jamil
- Additional Deputy Commissioner (Tax): Dulal Chandra Sutradhar
- Additional Deputy Commissioner (Education and Information and Communication Technology): Golam Mohammad Bhuiyan
- Additional District Magistrate: Alamgeer Hosain

=== Subdistricts/Upazilas ===
Kishoreganj District upazila geocode map

No.	Upazila	Capital	Pourasava	Union	Mouza	Mahalla	Village
1	Kuliarchar Upazila	Kuliarchar	1	6	46	37	97
2	Hossainpur Upazila	Hossainpur	1	6	73	16	90
3	Pakundia Upazila	Pakundia	1	9	97	25	149
4	Kishoreganj Sadar Upazila	Kishoreganj	1	11	107	84	219
5	Bajitpur Upazila	Bajitpur	1	11	92	28	195
6	Austagram Upazila	Austagram	0	8	59	0	72
7	Karimganj Upazila	Karimganj	1	11	85	17	185
8	Katiadi Upazila	Katiadi	1	9	95	20	160
9	Tarail Upazila	Tarail	0	7	76	0	105
10	Itna Upazila	Itna	0	9	86	0	116
11	Nikli Upazila	Nikli	0	7	43	0	132
12	Mithamain Upazila	Mithamain	0	7	59	0	137
13	Bhairab Upazila	Bhairab	1	7	32	29	88

== Education ==
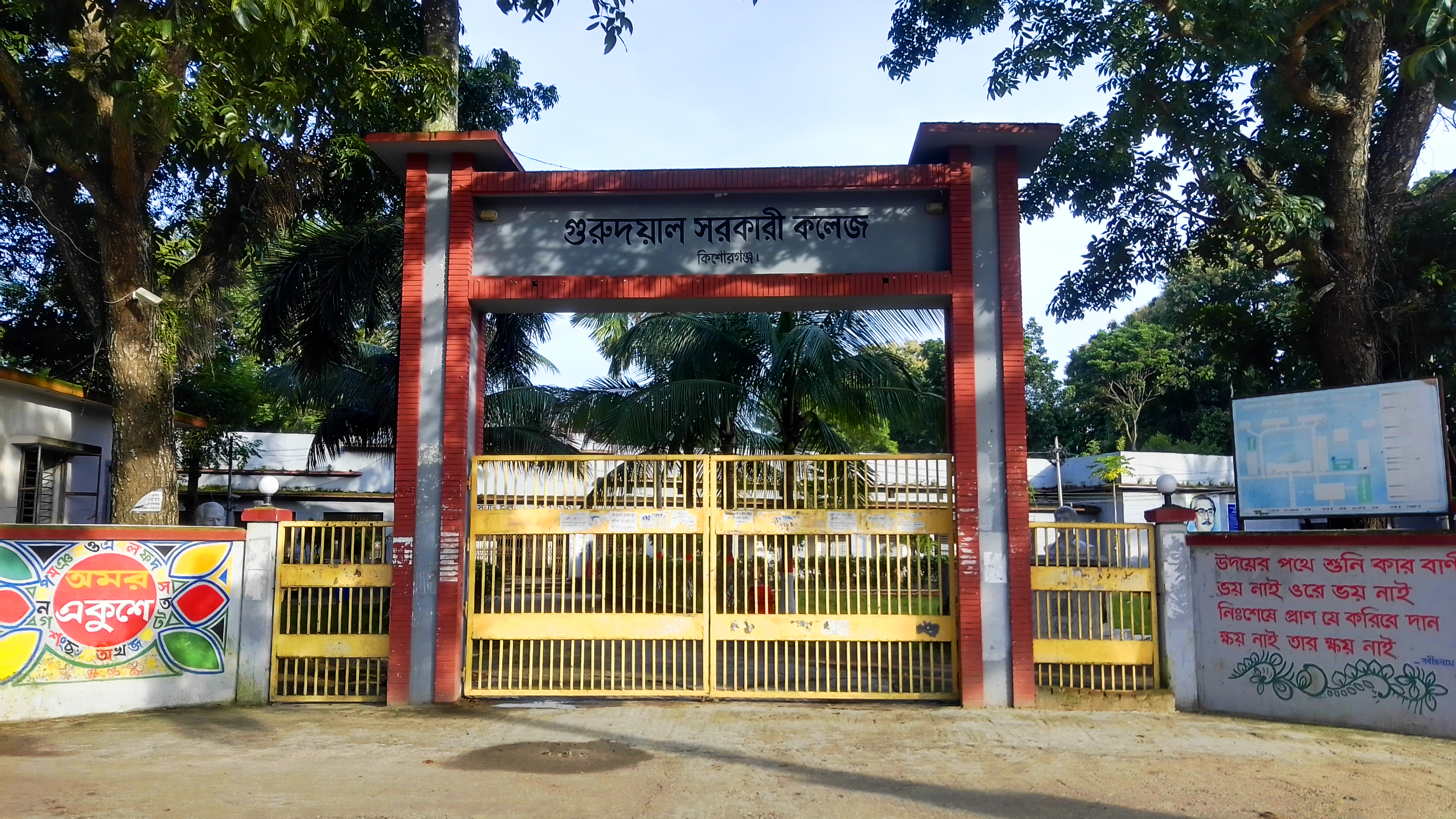
Govt. Gurudayal College entrance

- Universities
  - Kishoreganj University
  - Royal University of Dhaka (RUD), Bhairab, Kishoreganj
  - Ishakha International University Bangladesh
  - Al Jamiatul Imdadiya, Kishoreganj
  - Jamia Islamia Darul Uloom, Bhairab, Kishoreganj
- Medical College
  - Shahid Syed Nazrul Islam Medical College
  - Jahurul Islam Medical College
  - President Abdul Hamid Medical College and Hospital
- College
  - Gurudayal Govt. College (EST: 1943)
  - Aftab Uddin School and College,Bajitpur
  - Govt. Hazi Asmat College, Bhairab (EST: 1947)
  - Katiadi Govt. College
  - Kishoreganj Govt. Mohila College
  - Kuliarchar Government College, Kuliarchar (EST: 1973)
  - Pakundia Govt. Colleage
  - Govt. Zillur Rahman Mahila College
  - Tarail Muktijoddha Govt. College
  - Karimganj Govt. College
  - Rastrapati Abdul Hamid Govt. College
  - Bajitpur Govt. College
  - Hossainpur Govt College
  - Pakundia Adarsha Mohila College
  - Muktijoddha Abdul Haque Govt. College
  - Poura Mohila College
  - Walinewaz Khan College
- Secondary School
  - Kishorganj Govt. Boys' High School
  - S.V. Govt. Girls High School
  - Pakundia Govt. High School
  - Pakundia Girls High School
  - Aftab Uddin School and College,Bajitpur
  - Bhairab Government Kadir Baksa Pilot Model High School
  - Kishoreganj Model Boys' High School
  - Kishoreganj Model Girls' High School
  - Arjat Atarjan High School
  - Azim Uddin High School
  - Hashmat Uddin High School
  - Kishoreganj Ideal High School
  - Zilla Smoroni Girl's High School
  - Kishoregonj Girl's High School
- Polytechnic Institute
  - Kishoreganj Polytechnic Institute

== Media ==
=== Dailies ===
- The Daily Shatabdir Kantho
- Daily Ajker Desh
- Daily Amar Bangladesh
- Grihakon
- Bhatir Darpan
- Pratahik Chitra

=== Online dailies ===
- Muktijoddhar Kantho
- manabchatona24.com
- kalernatunsangbad.com

=== Weeklies ===
- Aryagaurava (1904)
- Kishoreganj Bartabaha (1924)
- Akhter (Urdu, 1926)
- Kishoreganj Barta (1946)
- Prativa (1952)
- Natun Patra (1962)

=== Fortnightlies ===
- Narasunda (1981)
- Grambangla (1985)
- Sristi (1986)
- Sakal (1988)
- Suchana (1990)
- Kishoreganj Parikrama (1991)
- Manihar (1991)
- Kishoreganj Prabaha (1993)
- Bibarani (Kuliarchar 1993)

== Notable people ==
- Azimuddin Hanafi (1838–1922), Islamic scholar, author, orator and poet
- Farid Uddin Masood, Islamic scholar
- Zainul Abedin (1914–1976), painter
- ABM Zahidul Haq (died 2008), former Deputy Minister of Shipping and Member of Jatiya Sangsad (MP), founder of Pakundia Adarsha Mohila College
- Debabrata Biswas (1911–1980), Rabindra Sangeet artist
- Anandamohan Bose (1847–1906), Indian politician, academic, social reformer, and lawyer
- Chuni Goswami (1938 – 2020), Indian international footballer and first class cricketer
- Trailokyanath Chakravarty (1889–1970), Indian revolutionary
- Nirad C. Chaudhuri (1897–1999), Indian Bengali−English writer and man of letters
- Hamiduddin Ahmad Khan, lawyer and politician
- AFM Alim Chowdhury (1928–1971), an eye doctor and intellectual
- Upendrakishore Ray Chowdhury (1863–1915), author, painter
- Abdul Monem Khan (1899-1971), longest serving governor of East Pakistan
- Abul Fateh (1924–2010), Diplomat and politician
- Prabodh Chandra Goswami (1911–1987), Indian educationist
- Abdul Hamid (politician) (born 1944), former president of Bangladesh
- Shah Abdul Hannan (1939–2021), Islamic philosopher, educationist, writer, economist and social worker, chairman of the National Board of Revenue, chairman of the Anti-Corruption Commission and deputy governor of Bangladesh Bank
- Amir Hossain (born 1957), judge of the Supreme Court of Bangladesh
- Jahurul Islam (1928–1995), industrial entrepreneur
- Syed Ashraful Islam (1952–2019), Minister of Public Administration of Bangladesh Government
- Syed Nazrul Islam (1925–1975), first vice president of Bangladesh
- Ilias Kanchan (born 1956), distinguished hero of Dhaka movie
- Ivy Rahman (1944–2004), Member of Parliament and former politician
- Zillur Rahman (1929–2013), former president of Bangladesh and a prominent politician
- Nazmul Hasan Papon (born 1961), the current president of Bangladesh Cricket Board and a member of parliament from Kishoreganj-6 constituency.
- Symon Sadik (born 1985), member of Bangla film industry
- Idris Ali (born 1947-2002), politician
- Sitara Begum
- Biplob Kumar Sarker
- Md. Shariful Alam
- Mazharul Islam Himel
- Maulvi Shah Abdul Hamid, Member of the Bengal Legislative Assembly representing Kishoreganj.

== See also ==
- Egarosindur
- Pakundia Adarsha Mohila College
