= Syed Shafayetul Islam =

Retired Major General of Bangladesh Army

- সৈয়দ শাফায়েতুল ইসলাম
- Born: 21 June 1953 (age 73); Kishoreganj, East Bengal, Pakistan
- Relatives: Syed Nazrul Islam (father); Syed Ashraful Islam (brother); Syeda Zakia Noor Lipi (sister); Farhad Hossain (brother-in-law)
- Military career
- Allegiance: Bangladesh
- Branch: Bangladesh Army; Bangladesh Rifles
- Service years: 1975–2002
- Rank: Major General
- Unit: Corps of Signals
- Commands: Sector Commander of BDR; Commander of 86th Independent Signals Brigade; Military Secretary to Prime Minister
- Conflicts: Chittagong Hill Tracts Conflict

Syed Shafayetul Islam (Bengali: সৈয়দ শাফায়েতুল ইসলাম) is a retired major general of the Bangladesh Army and a politician. He served as military secretary to the prime minister, Sheikh Hasina, from 1996 to March 2000.

== Biography ==
Syed Shafayetul Islam was born in Kishoreganj.. His father, Syed Nazrul Islam, was the acting president of the Mujibnagar Provisional Government of Bangladesh. His brother, Syed Ashraful Islam, was a Bangladeshi politician and minister who was the sixth General Secretary of Bangladesh Awami League. His sister, Syeda Zakia Noor Lipi, is the MP of Kishoreganj-1.
