= A. K. M. Shamsul Haque =

Bangladeshi politician

Member of Parliament
- In office 12 June 1996 – 28 September 1999
- Preceded by: ABM Zahidul Haq
- Succeeded by: Alauddin Ahammad
- Constituency: Kishoreganj-1
- In office 7 May 1986 – 3 March 1988
- Preceded by: Constituency established
- Succeeded by: Bazlul Karim Falu
- Constituency: Kishoreganj-1

Personal details
- Born: A. K. M. Shamsul Haque Golap Mia Jangalia Union, Pakundia Upazila, Kishoreganj District, Bangladesh
- Died: 25 September 1999 BIRDEM, Dhaka, Bangladesh
- Party: Bangladesh Awami League
- Children: A. K. M. Didarul Haque
- Awards: Ekushey Padak (2023)

A. K. M. Shamsul Haque was a Bangladesh Awami League politician and a member of parliament for Kishoreganj-1.

== Career ==
Haque was elected to parliament from Kishoreganj-1 as a Bangladesh Awami League candidate in 1996.
