= Pakundia =

Pakundia (Bengali: পাকুন্দিয়া) may refer to:

- Pakundia Municipality, town and municipality in Kishoreganj, Dhaka Division, Bangladesh
- Pakundia Upazila, upazila in Kishoreganj, Dhaka Division, Bangladesh
