= Kishoreganj (disambiguation) =

Kishoreganj is a city in Bangladesh. It also may refer to:

- Kishoreganj District, a district in Dhaka Division
  - Kishoreganj Sadar Upazila, eponymous upazila of Kishoreganj District
- Kishoreganj Upazila, an upazila of Nilphamari District
