= Banagram =

Banagram may refer to:

- Banagram, Kamarhati, Nadia, West Bengal, India
- Banagram, Paschim Bardhaman, West Bengal, India
- Banagram Union, Katiadi, Kishoregonj, Bangladesh
- Banagram Union, Morrelganj, Khulna, Bangladesh

== See also ==
- Bongram, Bangladesh
