= Banagram Union =

Banagram Union may refer to:

- Banagram Union, Katiadi, a union in Katiadi Upazila
- Banagram Union, Morrelganj, a union in Morrelganj Upazila
- Benghari Banagram Union, a union in Boda Upazila
