= Kishoreganj-1 =

Constituency of Bangladesh's Jatiya Sangsad

Coordinates: 24.45°N 90.78°E

- Constituency for the Jatiya Sangsad
- District: Kishoreganj District
- Division: Dhaka Division
- Electorate: 430,193 (2018)

Current constituency
- Created: 1984
- Member of Parliament: Mazharul Islam
- ← 161 Netrokona-5 163 Kishoreganj-2 →

Kishoreganj-1 is a constituency represented in the Jatiya Sangsad (National Parliament) of Bangladesh.

== Boundaries ==
The constituency encompasses Hossainpur and Kishoreganj Sadar upazilas.

== History ==
The constituency was created in 1984 from a Mymensingh constituency when the former Mymensingh District was split into four districts: Mymensingh, Sherpur, Netrokona, and Kishoreganj.

== Members of Parliament ==
Election	Member	Party
1986	A. K. M. Shamsul Haque	Awami League
1988	Bazlul Karim Falu	Jatiya Party
1991	ABM Zahidul Haq	BNP
1996	A. K. M. Shamsul Haque	Awami League
1999 by-election	Alauddin Ahammad	Jatiya Party (Manju)
2001	Edris Ali Bhuyian	Bangladesh Nationalist Party
2008	Sayed Ashraful Islam	Bangladesh Awami League
2019 by-election	Syeda Zakia Noor Lipi	Bangladesh Awami League
2026	Mazharul Islam	BNP

== Elections ==
=== Elections in the 2010s ===
Sayed Ashraful Islam was re-elected unopposed in the 2014 general election after opposition parties withdrew their candidacies in a boycott of the election.

=== Elections in the 2000s ===
General Election 2008: Kishoreganj-1
Party	Candidate	Votes	%	±%
AL	Sayed Ashraful Islam	172,065	62.2	+13.4
BNP	Md. Masud Hilali	100,080	36.2	−12.5
CPB	AKM Abu Raihan	3,526	1.3	N/A
BSD	Bikram Basudev Basak	751	0.3	N/A
KSJL	Faruk Ahmad Siddique	200	0.1	−0.1
Majority		71,985	26.0	+25.9
Turnout		276,622	84.2	+10.0
AL hold				

{{Election box candidate with party link||party=Krishak Sramik Janata League|candidate=Faruk Ahmad Siddique|votes=415|percentage=0.2|change=}}

General Election 2001: Kishoreganj-1
Party	Candidate	Votes	%	±%
BNP	Md. Idris Ali Bhuiyan	86,509	48.7	
Jatiya Party (M)	Alauddin Ahammad	86,294	48.8	
Bangladesh Muslim League (Jamir Ali)	A. K. M. Shahjahan	198	0.1	
Majority		114	0.1	
Turnout		177,553	74.2	
BNP hold				

=== Elections in the 1990s ===
A. K. M. Shamsul Haque died in September 1999. Alauddin Ahammad of the Awami League was elected in a 1999 by-election.

General Election June 1996: Kishoreganj-1
Party	Candidate	Votes	%	±%
AL	A. K. M. Shamsul Haque	58,233	43.0	+6.8
BNP	Md. Idris Ali Bhuiyan	38,216	28.2	−12.7
JP(E)	Md. Sohrab Uddin	29,848	22.1	+8.5
Jamaat	Nurul Haque	5,556	4.1	−2.2
Independent	ABM Zahidul Haq	2,542	1.9	N/A
Zaker Party	A. K. M. Fazlul Haque	363	0.3	−0.2
Gano Forum	Md. Shafiur Rahman Khan	275	0.2	N/A
Bangladesh Muslim League (Jamir Ali)	A. K. M. Shahjahan	255	0.2	N/A
Majority		20,017	14.8	+10.1
Turnout		135,288	72.1	+24.4
AL gain from BNP				

General Election 1991: Kishoreganj-1
Party	Candidate	Votes	%	±%
BNP	ABM Zahidul Haq	41,010	40.9	
AL	AKM Shamsul Haque	36,256	36.2	
JP(E)	Md. Sohrab Uddin	13,661	13.6	
Jamaat	Md. Tyabuzzaman	6,282	6.3	
Bangladesh Muslim League (Kader)	A. K. M. Shahjahan	1,635	1.6	
Zaker Party	Md. Mujibur Rahman	459	0.5	
Jatiya Oikkya Front	Md. Baki	336	0.3	
Independent	Md. Jalal Uddin Faruk	314	0.3	
Independent	Md. Fazlur Rahman Reza	178	0.2	
Jatiya Samajtantrik Dal-JSD	Md. A. Momen	128	0.1	
Majority		4,754	4.7	
Turnout		100,259	47.7	
BNP gain from				
