= Charkowna =

Village in Kishoreganj District, Bangladesh

Coordinates: 24.3678°N 90.6469°E

Char Kaona is a village of Jangalia Union, Pakundia Upazila, Kishoreganj District, Bangladesh.
