= Jangalia Union =

Coordinates: 24.3718°N 90.6667°E

Jangalia Union is the largest union of Pakundia Upazila, Kishoreganj District, Bangladesh. Its total land area is 6,817 acres. Total population of the union 32,839 residents in 16 villages. The union has many educational institutes, mosque, market and 3 post offices. Narasunda River gone through Jangalia Union and is connected to Brahmaputra River and haor.

== Geography ==
Jangalia is located at Pakundia Upazila in Kishoreganj District. It is just beside Hossainpur Upazila and Narsunda River. The Union is under Dhaka Division.

== Villages ==
There are many villages under Jangalia Union. These are: Jangalia, North Jangalia, Bishwanathpur, Dagdaga, Kazihati, Tarakandi, Manullarchar, Charteki, Charteki Dogarerpar, Charkawna Muniarikanda, Charkwna Maishakanda, and Charkawna Nayapara.

== Demographics ==
Jangalia Union had a total population of 32,839 where 16,200 male and 16,639 female.

== Administration ==
The administrative office of 1 No Jangalia Union Parishad is located at Jangalia Bazar (Pakundia - Hossainpur Road). Head of the Union Parishad administration is Chairman. The current chairman of the 1 No Jangalia Union Parishad is Mr. Bulbul Ahmed.

== Transport ==
Jangalia Union is connected to the country with several roads. It is directly connected to the capital city Dhaka which is around 100 km away. There are several bus services route passes through Jangalia Bazar from Dhaka to Kishoreganj.

== Market ==
There are some bazar (market) in the Jangalia Union. Jangalia Bazar, Tarakandi Bazar, Charkawna Bazar, Dagdaga Bazar etc.

== Healthcare ==
There is a family planning government clinic in Jangalia Union.
