= Kishorganj Govt. Boys' High School =

Coordinates: 24.4391°N 90.7793°E

Location
- Kachari Bazar, Kishoreganj; Kishoreganj; Bangladesh

Information
- Type: Government School
- Motto: Education For Discipline And Character
- Established: 1881
- School board: Board of Intermediate and Secondary Education, Dhaka
- Headmaster: Selina Begum
- classes: 6-10
- Campus: 3.7 acres (1.5 ha)
- Color: White

Kishorganj Govt. Boys' High School or KGBHS (Bengali: কিশোরগঞ্জ সরকারি বালক উচ্চ বিদ্যালয়) is a higher secondary school in Kishoreganj Sadar Upazila, Kishoreganj, Bangladesh. Established in 1881, the school has a 3.5 acres (1.4 ha) campus.
