= ABM Zahidul Haq =

Bangladeshi politician (died 2008)

- এবিএম জাহিদুল হক

Deputy Minister of Shipping
- In office March 1991 – January 1996
- Succeeded by: Dhirendra Debnath Shambhu

Member of Parliament for Kishoreganj-1
- In office March 1991 – March 1996
- Preceded by: Bazlul Karim Falu
- Succeeded by: A. K. M. Shamsul Haque

Personal details
- Born: Pakundia Upazila
- Died: 13 September 2008 Dhaka, Bangladesh
- Party: Bangladesh Nationalist Party

ABM Zahidul Haq (Bengali: এবিএম জাহিদুল হক; died 13 September 2008) was a Bangladesh Nationalist Party politician and a Jatiya Sangsad member (MP) representing the Kishoreganj-1 constituency during 1991–1996. He also served as the Deputy Minister of Shipping in the same period. He founded Pakundia Adarsha Mohila College in 1993.

== Early life and education ==
ABM Zahidul Haq was born in the village of Narandi, located in Pakundia, Kishoreganj. He completed his early education in local schools and pursued higher education at a reputed institution in Bangladesh, focusing on political science and public administration.

== Political career ==
ABM Zahidul Haq gained prominence as a member of the Bangladesh Nationalist Party and was elected as a member of parliament for the Kishoreganj-1 constituency during the 5th and 6th parliamentary terms. During his tenure, he also served as the Deputy Minister of Shipping, overseeing improvements in the country's maritime infrastructure.

== Contributions to Education and Infrastructure ==
Haq was instrumental in the development of educational institutions in the Kishoreganj district. He established the first girls' degree college in Pakundia, known as Pakundia Adarsha Mohila College. Additionally, he played a key role in improving local road networks and bridges to enhance connectivity within the region.

== Personal life and legacy ==
ABM Zahidul Haq was well respected in the Pakundia and Hossainpur regions for his contributions to education and infrastructure. He died on 13 September 2008 in Dhaka.
