= Syeda Zakia Noor Lipi =

Bangladeshi politician

Sayeda Zakia Noor Lipi
- সৈয়দা জাকিয়া নূর লিপি

Member of the Bangladesh Parliament for Kishoreganj-1
- In office 16 February 2019 – 6 August 2024
- Preceded by: Sayed Ashraful Islam

Personal details
- Born: 10 January 1966 (age 60) Mymensingh, East Pakistan, Pakistan
- Party: Bangladesh Awami League
- Parent: Syed Nazrul Islam (father)
- Relatives: Sayed Ashraful Islam, Syed Shafayetul Islam (brothers)
- Education: Mymensingh Medical College, Loughborough University, UK, Newcastle Medical School, UK
- Occupation: Doctor

Sayeda Zakia Noor Lipi (born 10 January 1966) is a Grand Alliance politician and a former Jatiya Sangsad member representing the Kishoreganj-1 constituency. This is the same constituency which her father, Syed Nazrul Islam, national leader and the acting president of Mujibnagar government 1971, and her eldest brother, Sayed Ashraful Islam, the ex-general secretary of Bangladesh Awami League and a cabinet minister, represented for over three decades.
