= Aurangzeb Mosque =

Former mosque in Kishoreganj, Bangladesh

- আওরঙ্গজেব মসজিদ
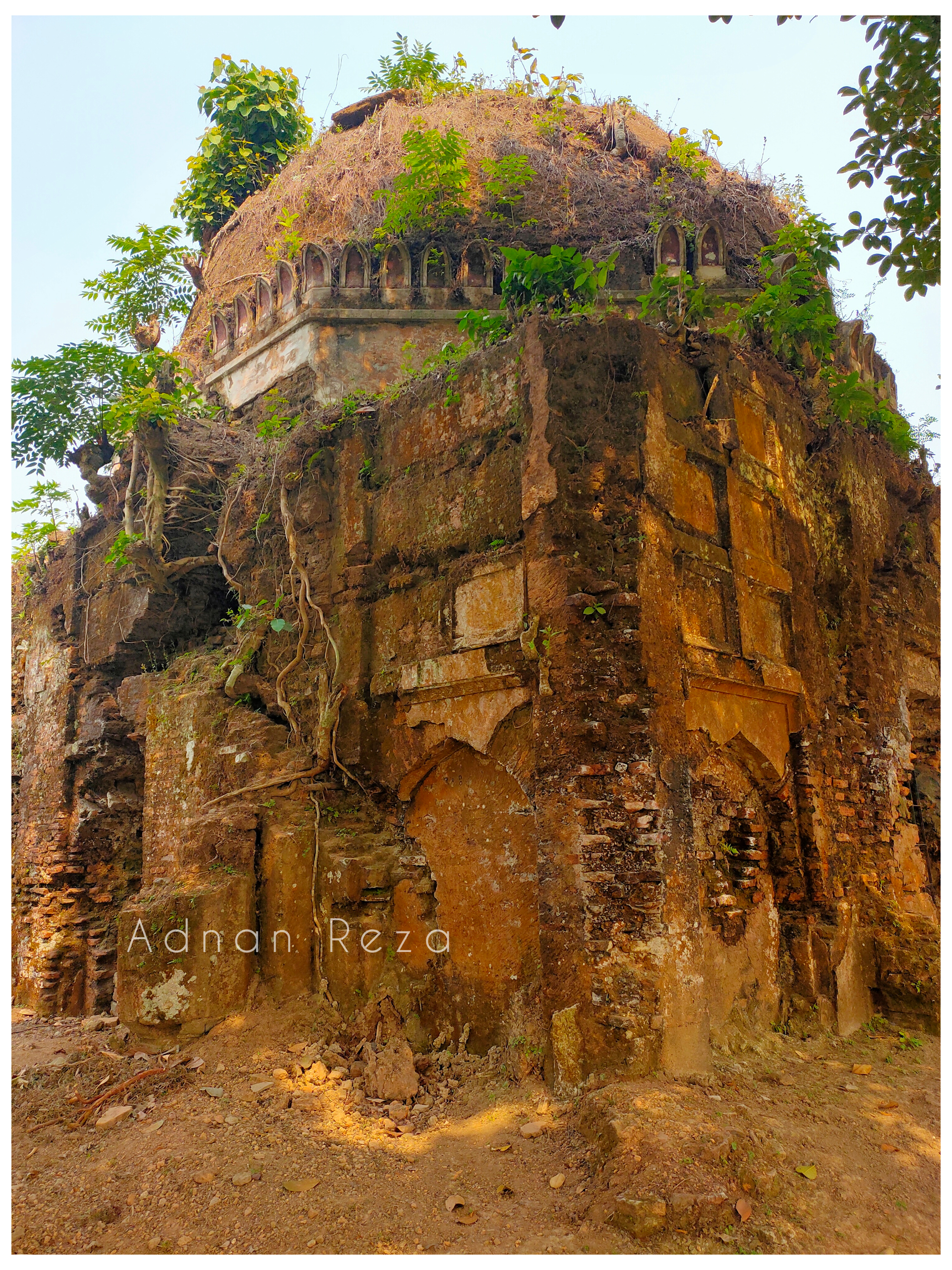
- The former mosque, in ruins

- Location of the former mosque in Bangladesh

Religion
- Affiliation: Islam (former)
- Ecclesiastical or organizational status: Mosque (former)
- Ownership: Mian family of Shalangka
- Status: Abandoned (ruinous state)

Location
- Location: Pakundia, Kishoreganj District
- Country: Bangladesh
- Interactive map of Aurangzeb Mosque
- Administration: Department of Archaeology
- Coordinates: 24°20.6′N 90°44.4′E

Architecture
- Dome: One

The Aurangzeb Mosque (Bengali: আওরঙ্গজেব মসজিদ, Arabic: مسجد أورنكزيب) is an ancient former mosque and archeological site located in the village of Shalangka in the Pakundia Upazila, in the Kishoreganj District of Bangladesh.

== History ==
The historic former mosque is located in the village of Shalangka in Narandi Union. It was constructed during the reign of Mughal emperor Aurangzeb, from whom it gets its name. Shaykh Muhammad Hanif, a muhaddith in Aurangzeb's royal court, was granted a jagir (land grant) of 62 mouzas from the emperor for his services. Under Aurangzeb's instruction, Hanif moved from Delhi to Eastern Bengal and established a zamindari in this region. The foundations of this mosque were established by Hanif in 1669. The Bangladeshi Department of Archaeology listed it in 1909 as one of the architectural sites to be preserved.

== Architecture ==
The mosque is built on a high ground with four pillars having large octagons at the four corners of this quadrilateral mosque. There are three entrances on the eastern wall of the mosque, of which the central entrance is relatively large. Above the entrance there is a wonderful prayer carved in white stone. Also there are two entrances, one in the north wall and one in the south wall. The Aurangzeb Mosque has one dome.

== Gallery ==
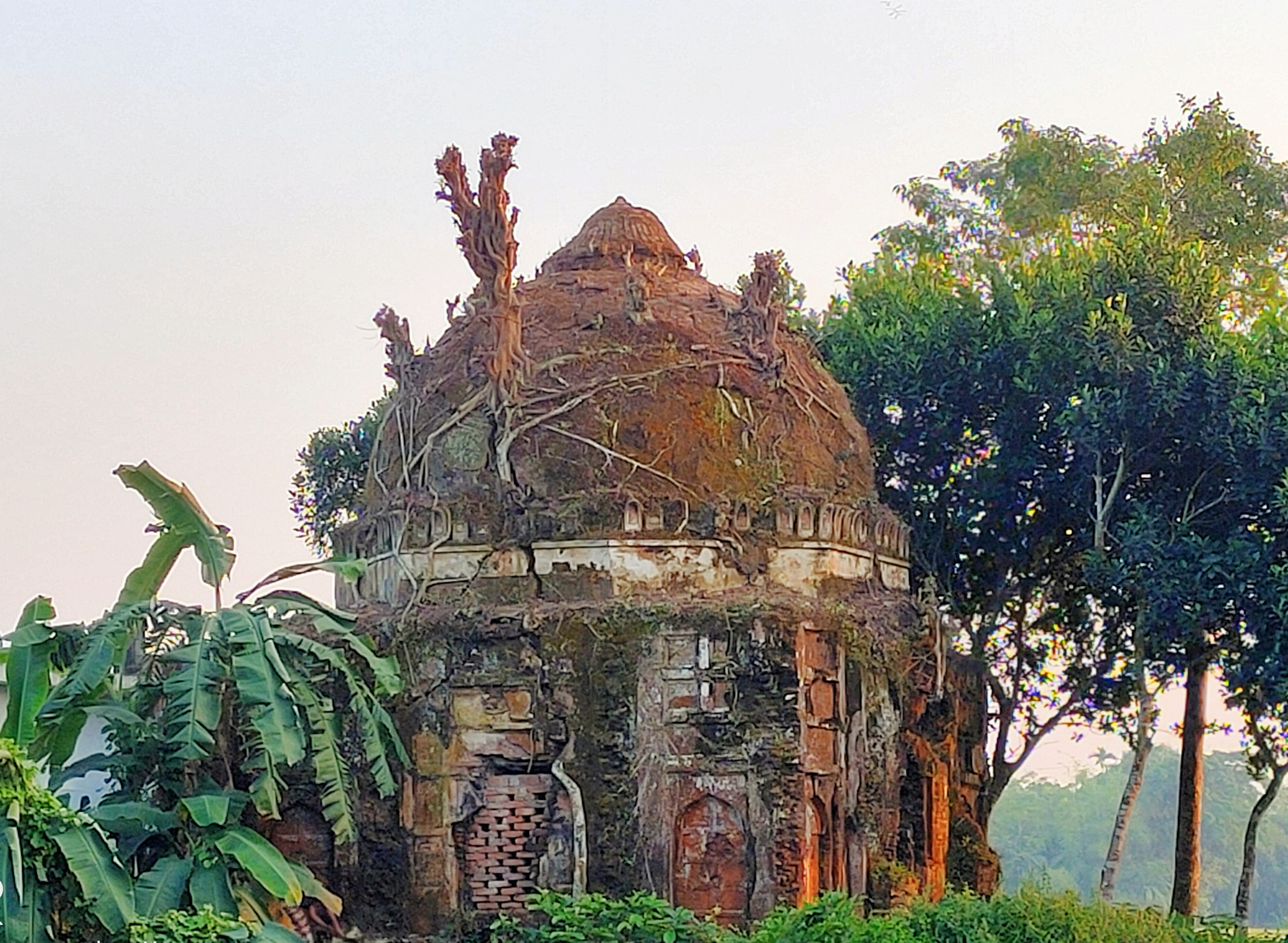
The mosque, from a distance

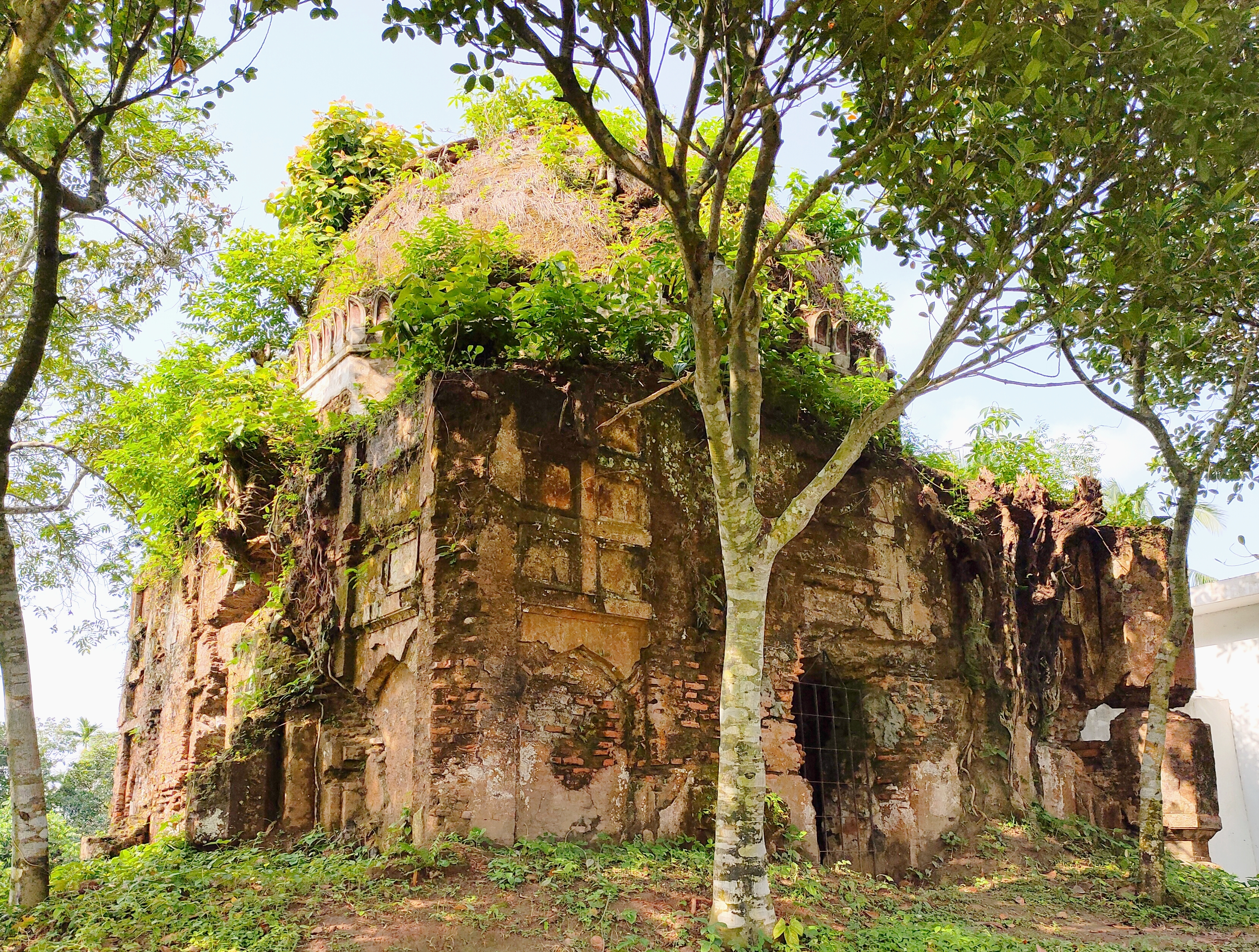
In front

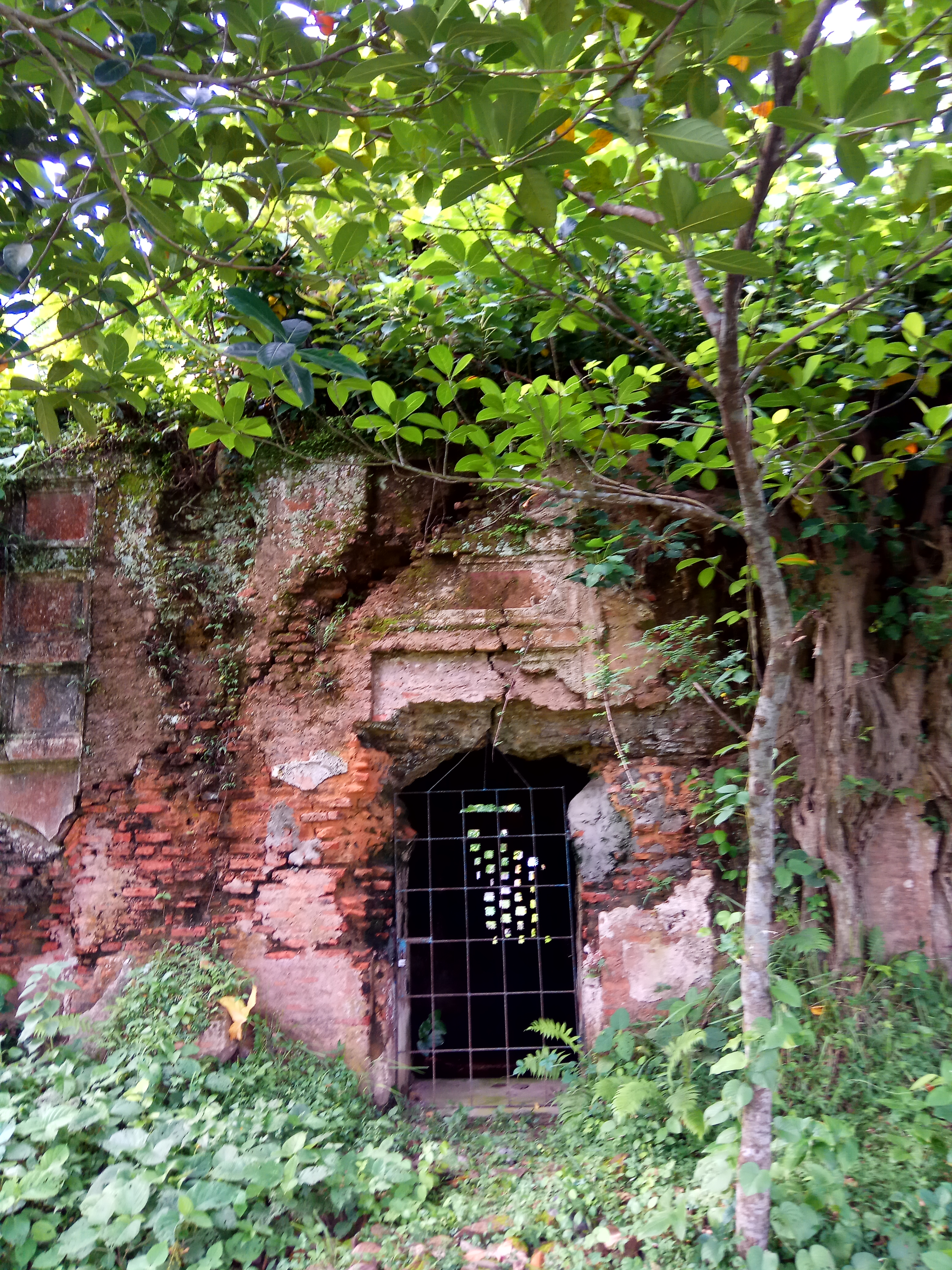
Door

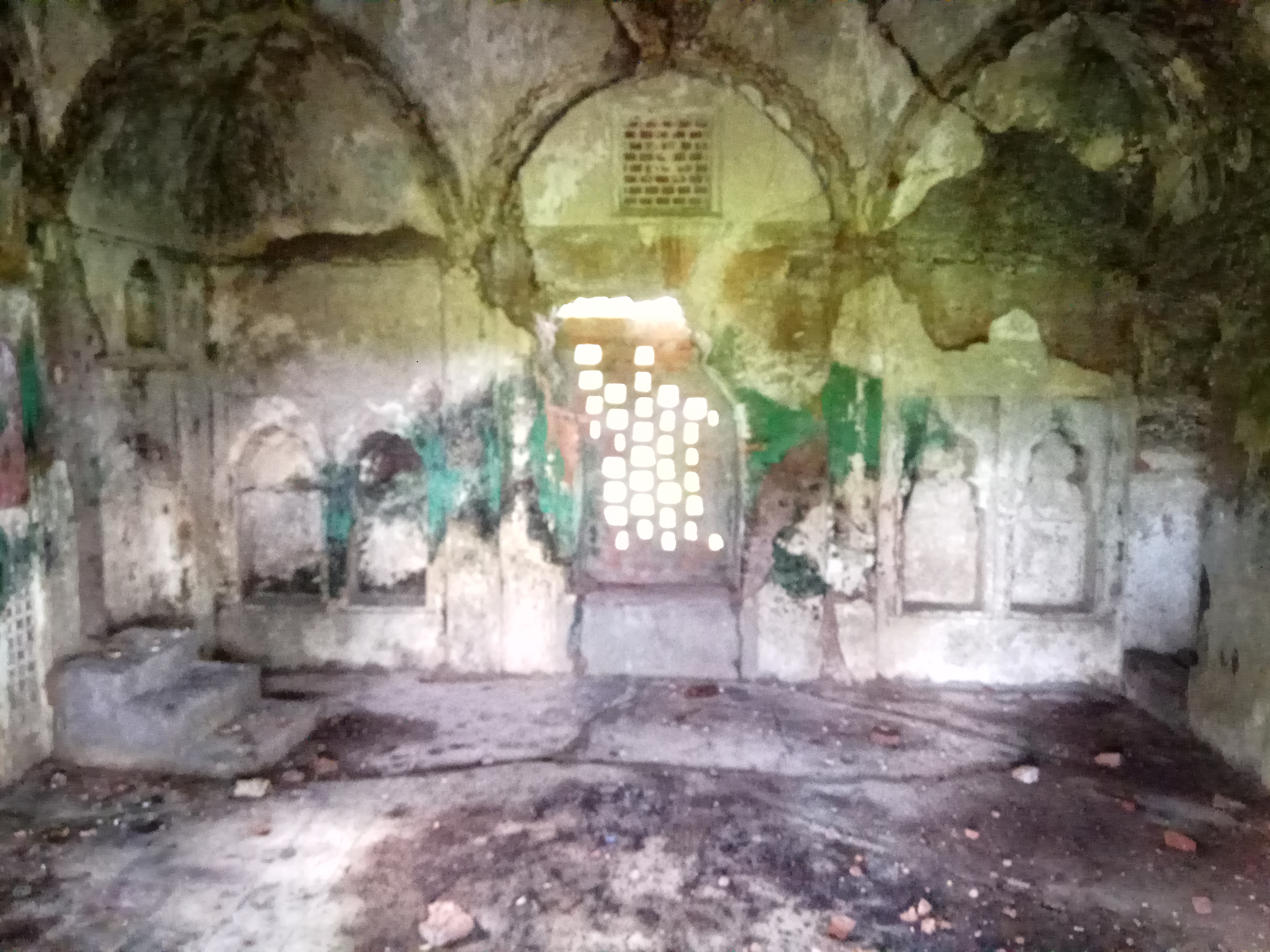
Inside

== See also ==
- Islam in Bangladesh
- List of mosques in Bangladesh
- List of archaeological sites in Bangladesh
