= Kamarhati, Nadia =

Kamarhati
- Village
- Location in West Bengal, India
- Coordinates: 23.522852°N 88.427493°E
- Country: India
- State: West Bengal
- District: Nadia

Population
  - Total: 2,231

Languages
  - Official: Bengali, English
- Time zone: UTC+5:30 (IST)
- PIN: 741154
- Telephone code: 91 3472
- Gram Panchayet: Sadhanpara 1 No. Gram Panchayet

Kamarhati is a village in Krishnanagar II CD Block in Krishnanagar Sadar subdivision of Nadia district of West Bengal, India beside Dhubulia. Most of the people in this village are Hindu in religion. There are three villages surrounded Kamarhati, named Muragachha, Banagram, Chupipota, Ghateswar, where Banagram is a small locality at the interface of Kamarhati and Ghateswar. Krishnanagar is the nearest town from Kamarhati.

== History ==
Many people migrated to Kamarhati from Bangladesh at the time of the partition of India in 1947.

== Geography ==
Kamarhati is located at 23°31′22″N 88°25′39″E. Most of the land is used for cultivation. Farmers from here grow crops like rice, mustard, jute and vegetables.

== Police station ==
Police station of Kamarhati is Dhubulia Police Station which has jurisdiction over Krishnanagar II CD Block. The total area covered by the police station is 134.74 km^{2}.

== Post Office ==
In this village, a branch post office is situated named Kamarhati Branch Post Office and postal code is 741154.

== Economy ==
Most of the people of Kamarhati depends on Cultivation. Also, many of them earn from Cottage industry.

== Education ==
- Kamarhati Chittaranjan High School
- Banagram Board Primary School
- Kamarhati Shyamlalgsfp School
