= Kishoreganj =

Capital of Kishoreganj District, Dhaka Division, Bangladesh

Kishoreganj কিশোরগঞ্জ
- City and Municipality
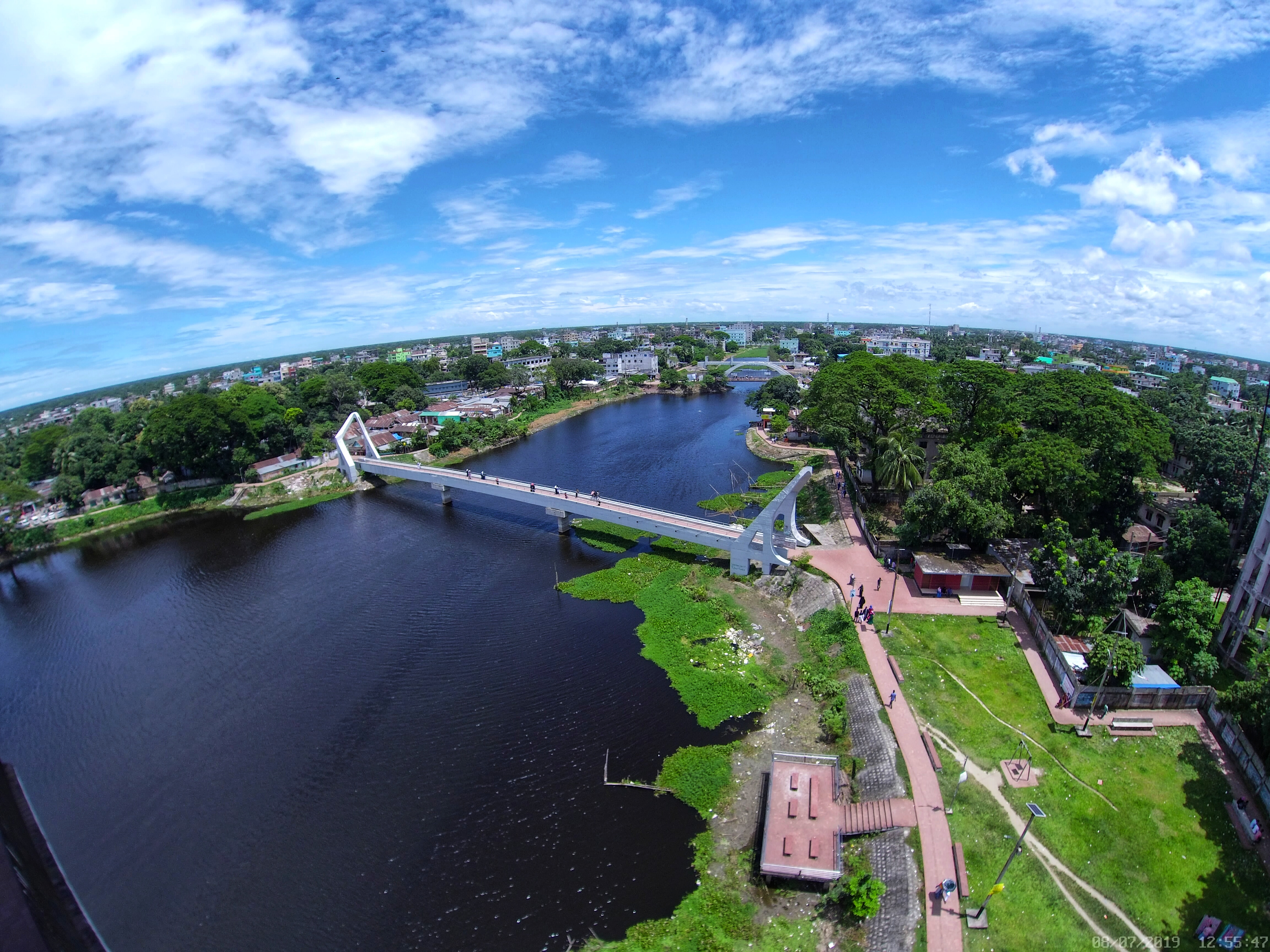
- A view of Kishoreganj and the Narsunda River from a watch-tower

- Location within Dhaka division Location within Bangladesh
- Coordinates: 24.4385°N 90.7764°E
- Country: Bangladesh
- Division: Dhaka
- District: Kishoreganj
- Upazila: Kishoreganj Sadar

Government
  - Type: Mayor–Council
  - Body: Kishoreganj Municipality
  - Paura Mayor: Khalekuzzaman Rumman

Area
  - Total: 11.3 km^{2} (4.4 sq mi)

Population (2011)
  - Total: 103,798
  - Density: 9,190/km^{2} (23,800/sq mi)
- Time zone: UTC+6 (Bangladesh Time)
- Postal code: 2300
- National Dialing Code: +880

Kishoreganj is a city and the headquarters of Kishoreganj District and Kishoreganj Sadar Upazila in Dhaka Division, Bangladesh. Kishorganj is poorly developed district in Bangladesh with very few development and now part of Dhaka Division. The establishment of the Kishorganj began with 2495.07 square kilometres of land requisitioned from Mymensingh. Earlier it was a Mahakuma of Mymensingh district and one of the important economic cente in Bangladesh. During 1950, Kishorganj has GDP growth rate of 19%. During that time, the local economy was driven by jute, rice, fish, and river-based trade.

== Demographics ==
Religions in Kishoreganj Paurashava (2022)
Religion	Percent
Islam	88.10%
Hinduism	11.86%
Other or not stated	0.04%

According to the 2022 Bangladesh census, Kishoreganj Paurashava had 32,146 households and a population of 138,063. Kishoreganj had a literacy rate of 88.62%: 90.04% for males and 87.24% for females, and a sex ratio of 98.29 males per 100 females. 8.29% of the population was under 5 years of age.

Kishoreganj Municipality mahallah geocode map

According to the 2011 Bangladesh census, Kishoreganj Paurashava had 21,879 households and a population of 103,798. Out of this total, 20,848 inhabitants (20.09%) were under 10 years of age. Kishoreganj had a literacy rate (age 7 and over) of 72.54%, compared to the national average of 51.8%, and a sex ratio of 976 females per 1000 males.

== See also ==
- ABM Zahidul Haq
- Pakundia Adarsha Mohila College
