= Katiadi Upazila =

Katiadi কটিয়াদি
- Upazila
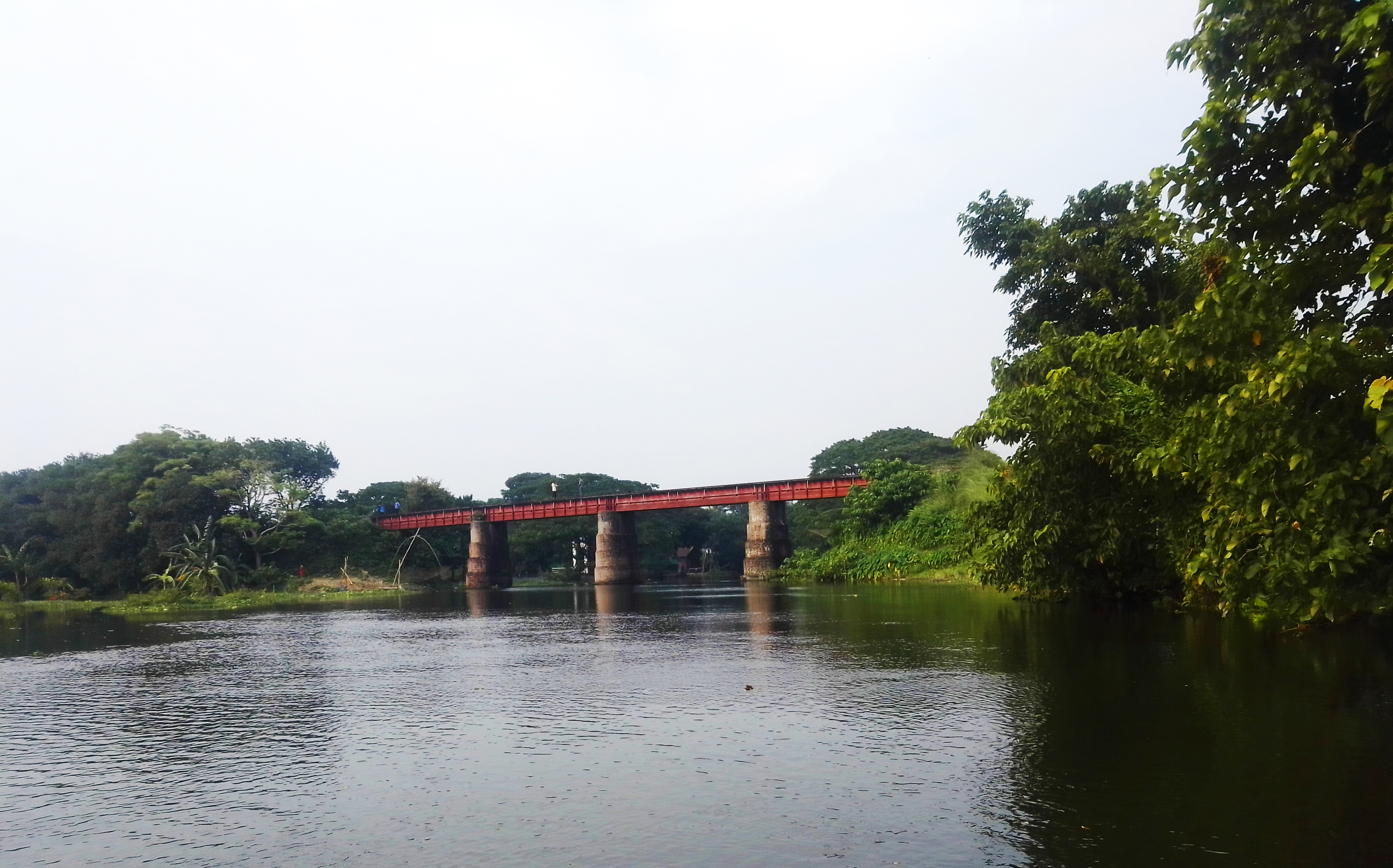
- River and railway bridge in Katiadi

- Coordinates: 24°15′00″N 90°47′30″E
- Country: Bangladesh
- Division: Dhaka
- District: Kishoreganj

Area
  - Total: 219.21 km^{2} (84.64 sq mi)

Population (2022)
  - Total: 351,466
  - Density: 1,603.3/km^{2} (4,152.6/sq mi)
- Time zone: UTC+6 (BST)
- Postal code: 2330
- Area code: 09428
- Website: katiadi.kishoreganj.gov.bd

Katiadi Upazila mauza geocode map

Katiadi (Bengali: কটিয়াদি) is an upazila of Kishoreganj District in Dhaka Division, Bangladesh.

== Geography ==
Katiadi has an area of 219.22 square kilometres (84.64 sq mi).

Katiadi Upazila has an area of 219.21 km^{2}. It is bounded by Kishoreganj Sadar and Karimganj Upazilas on the north, Belabo and Monohardi upazilas of Narsingdi district on the south, Nikli and Bajitpur upazilas on the east, and Pakundia Upazila on the west. Purushbadhia, Doba and Reksa Beels are notable.

== Demographics ==
Religions in Katiadi Upazila (2022)
Religion	Percent
Islam	96.73%
Hinduism	3.26%
Other or not stated	0.01%

According to the 2022 Bangladeshi census, Katiadi Upazila had 84,613 households and a population of 351,466. 10.88% of the population were under 5 years of age. Katiadi had a literacy rate (age 7 and over) of 67.09%: 67.31% for males and 66.91% for females, and a sex ratio of 88.08 males for every 100 females. 80,988 (23.04%) lived in urban areas.

According to the 2011 Census of Bangladesh, Katiadi Upazila had 69,801 households and a population of 314,529. 88,092 (28.01%) were under 10 years of age. Katiadi had a literacy rate (age 7 and over) of 40.61%, compared to the national average of 51.8%, and a sex ratio of 1083 females per 1000 males. 40,725 (12.95%) lived in urban areas.

As of the 1991 Bangladesh census, Katiadi had a population of 264,501, across 49,488 households. Males constituted 50.24% of the population and females 49.76%. The number of adults over the age of 18 is 125,001. Katiadi had an average literacy rate of 20.3% (7+ years), compared to the national average of 32.4%.

== Transportation ==
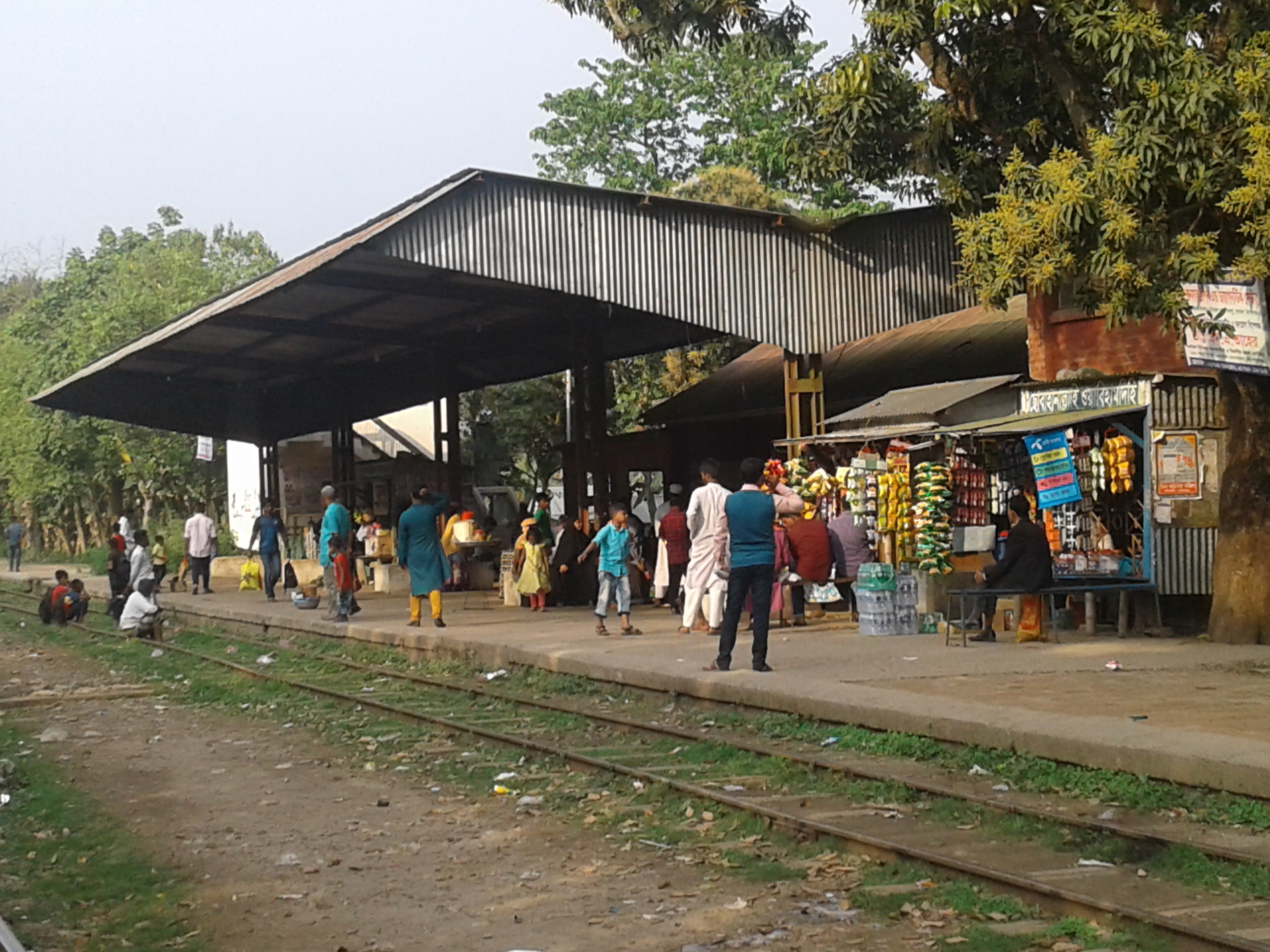
A railway station of Katiadi upazila

There are many methods of transportation in this upazila, it also has two railway stations including;

- Gachihata Railway Station
- Manik Khali Railway Station

== Administration ==
Katiadi thana became an upazila in 1983. Katiadi was declared a municipality in 1999.

List of union's
NO	Union Name
01	Banagram Union
02	Achmita Union
03	Jalalpur Union
04	Lohajhuri Union
05	Korgaon Union
06	Chandpur Union
07	Sohosram Dhuldia Union
08	Mumurdia Union
09	Masua Union

The union parishads are subdivided into 97 mauzas and 156 villages.

Kaitadi Municipality is subdivided into 9 wards and 20 mahallas.

== Notable people ==
- Upendrakishore Ray Chowdhury, writer and painter

== See also ==
- Upazilas of Bangladesh
- Districts of Bangladesh
- Divisions of Bangladesh
- Upazila Nirbahi Officer
- Administrative geography of Bangladesh
