= Sholmara Killing Field =

Mass killings site during Bangladesh Liberation War

- শোলমারা বধ্যভূমি
- Interactive map of Sholmara Killing Field
- Location: Sholmara, Mohinand Union, Kishoreganj Sadar Upazila
- Coordinates: 24°27′44.50″N 90°47′03.60″E
- Type: Mass grave & monument
- Opening date: June 24, 2023; 3 years ago

Sholmara Killing Field (Bengali: শোলমারা বধ্যভূমি) is one of the principal massacre and mass grave sites in Kishoreganj District, Bangladesh. It is among the regular sites where the Pakistan Army carried out genocide during the Bangladesh Liberation War and is one of the 27 officially recognized massacre and mass killing sites in the district. The site is situated near the Upazila Parishad building of Mohinand Union in Kishoreganj Sadar Upazila, close to Khirdganj Market, adjacent to the Sholmarā Bridge over the Anna Canal.

== History ==
The Sholmara Bridge was used by the Pakistan Army to kill civilians and individuals associated with the Liberation War. During the war, teachers, intellectuals, family members of freedom fighters, and innocent people from surrounding vicinity were tied up on the bridge, shot dead, and then thrown into Anna Canal. Among these mass killings, the incident in August where 10 people were killed together is particularly notable, as the body of retired food controller Nabi Hossain Bhuiya was identified among them. Most of the bodies floated in the canal's waters, including the Bhakkarkhila Beel and surrounding areas. Unidentified bodies were buried beside the bridge at the Sholmara killing field.

== Monument ==
Renovation of the killing field began in 2021. The Kishoreganj Public Works Department built a memorial here at a cost of 8 million taka. The official inauguration of the memorial took place on June 24, 2023.
