= Alauddin Ahammad =

Bangladesh academic and politician (c. 1948 – 2022)

- আলাউদ্দিন আহম্মদ

5th Vice-chancellor of Jahangirnagar University
- In office 18 July 1998 – 1999
- Preceded by: Amirul Islam Chowdhury
- Succeeded by: Abdul Bayes

Member of Parliament for Kishoreganj-1
- In office 1999–2001
- Preceded by: A. K. M. Shamsul Haque MP TERM 2 (2001-2006)
- Succeeded by: Edris Ali Bhuyian (Bangladesh Nationalist Party)

Personal details
- Born: 1947/1948
- Died: 13 December 2022 (aged 74)
- Political party: Bangladesh Awami League

Alauddin Ahammad (1947/1948 – 13 December 2022) was a Bangladesh Awami League politician and a Jatiya Sangsad member representing the Kishoreganj-1 constituency. He was a vice-chancellor of Jahangirnagar University.

== Career ==
Ahammad was a veteran of the Bangladesh Liberation War.

In 1998, Ahammad resigned after a rape on campus led to mass protests by the students and teachers.

Ahammad was elected to the parliament from Kishoreganj-1 as a Bangladesh Awami League candidate in a 1999 by-election and again in 2001.

Ahammad served as the education and political affairs advisor to Prime Minister Sheikh Hasina in 2013.
