= Jibon Rahman =

Bangladeshi film director (1964–2020)

- Born: 1964
- Died: 16 January 2020 (aged 56)
- Occupation: Film Director

Jibon Rahman (1964 – 16 January 2020) was a Bangladeshi film director. He directed 15 films.

== Biography ==
Rahman was born in 1964 at Mothkhola in Pakundia of Kishoreganj. His first direction Gohor Badsha Banecha Pori was released in the early 90s.

Rahman directed Prem Juddho which was released in 1994. In this film Salman Shah worked as a playback singer for the first time in his career. He recorded a song titled "Tumi Amar Jiboner Ek Swapno Jeno" for this film. This film is selected for preservation in the Bangladesh Film Archive.

Rahman also directed films like Ajker Sontrasi and Ashar Pradip. These films are also selected for preservation in the Bangladesh Film Archive.

Rahman died on 16 January 2020 at his own home which is situated at Mothkhola in Pakundia of Kishoreganj at the age of 56.

== Selected filmography ==
- Gohor Badsha Banechha Pori
- Hulia
- Ajker Sontrasi
- Prem Juddho
- Ashar Pradip
- Ali Keno Golam
- Moha Songram
- Uttar Dakshin
