= Pakundia Municipality =

Town and municipality in Bangladesh

Pakundia Municipality পাকুন্দিয়া পৌরসভা
- Municipality
- Pakundia Pourasabha

- Location in Bangladesh
- Coordinates: 24°19′46.1″N 90°40′52.5″E
- Country: Bangladesh
- Division: Dhaka Division
- District: Kishoreganj District
- Upazila: Pakundia Upazila
- Formed as municipality: 2007; 19 years ago

Government
  - Mayor: Md. Nazrul Islam Akand

Area
  - Total: 13.33 km^{2} (5.15 sq mi)

Population (2011)
  - Total: 28,773
  - Density: 2,159/km^{2} (5,591/sq mi)
- Time zone: UTC+6 (BST)
- Postal code: 2326

Pakundia Municipality mahallah geocode map

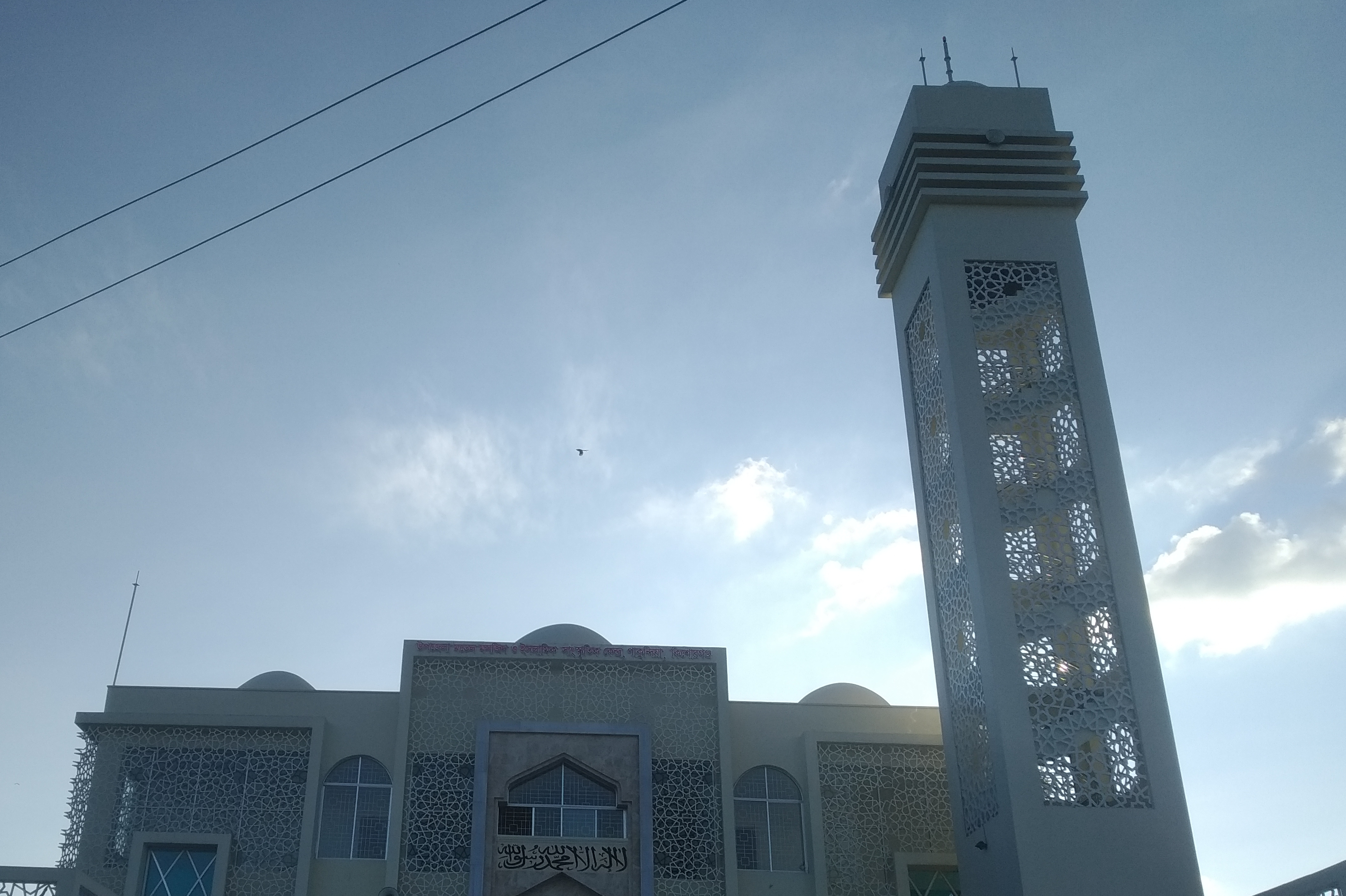
Pakundia Model Mosque and Islamic Cultural Center, located in Pakundia Municipality

Pakundia Municipality (Bengali: পাকুন্দিয়া পৌরসভা; also known as Pakundia Pourasabha, Pakundia Paurashava) is a town and municipality in Pakundia, Kishoreganj, Dhaka Division, Bangladesh. The municipality was established on 30 March 2007. Its total land area is 13.33 square kilometres (5.15 square miles). The municipality has a population of 28,773 residents.

== Education ==
=== College ===
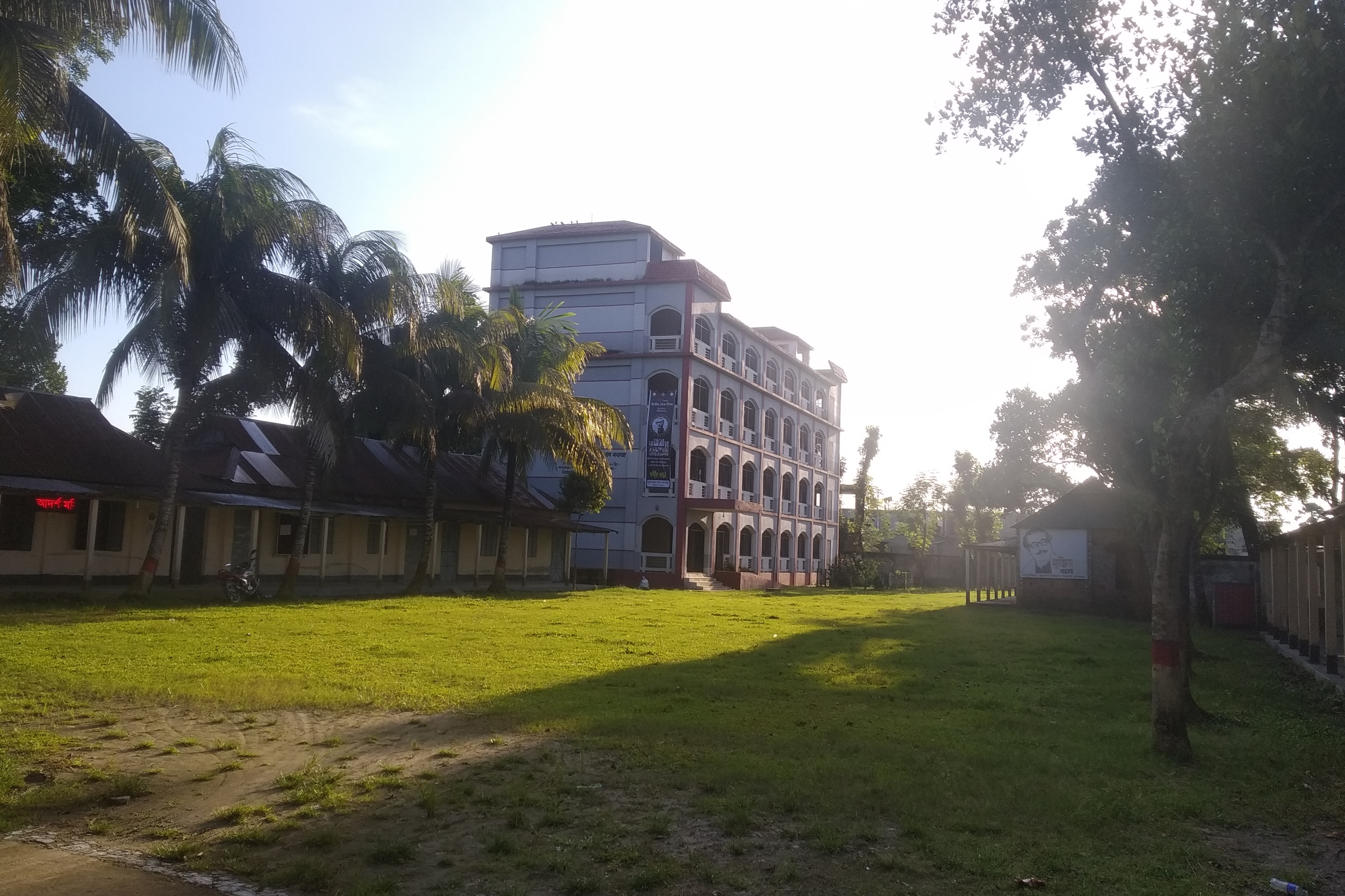
Pakundia Adarsha Mohila College

- Pakundia Adarsha Mohila College
- Pakundia Government College

== Mayor of Pakundia ==
Current mayor of Pakundia Municipality is Md. Nazrul Islam Akand.

List of mayors
Serial No.	Name	Held office
1	Md. Jalal Uddin	2011–2016
2	Md. Aktaruzzaman Khokon	2016–2023
3	Md. Nazrul Islam Akand	2023–present

== See also ==
- List of cities and towns in Bangladesh
- List of municipal corporations in Bangladesh
- Pakundia Adarsha Mohila College
