= Sayed Ashraful Islam =

Bangladeshi politician (c.1952–2019)

- সৈয়দ আশরাফুল ইসলাম
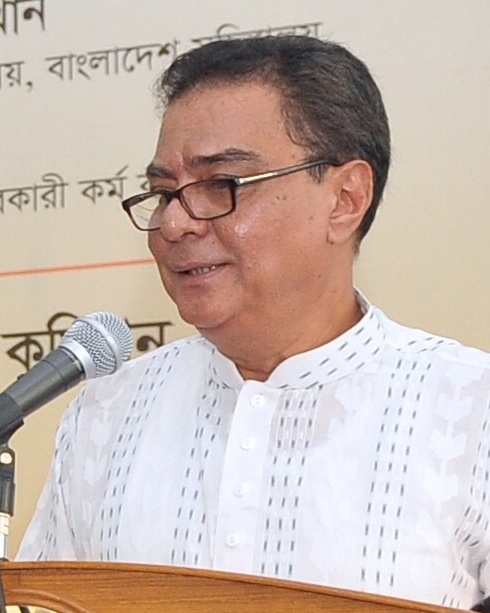
- Ashraful in 2016

Minister of Public Administration
- In office 22 July 2015 – 3 January 2019
- Succeeded by: Sheikh Hasina

Minister of Local Government and Rural Development and Co-operative
- In office 6 January 2009 – 9 July 2015
- Preceded by: Anwarul Iqbal
- Succeeded by: Khandaker Mosharraf Hossain

State Minister of Civil Aviation and Tourism
- In office 23 June 1996 – 15 July 2001
- Preceded by: Muhiuddin Khan Alamgir
- Succeeded by: Mir Mohammad Nasiruddin

Member of the Bangladesh Parliament for Kishoreganj-1
- In office 29 December 2008 – 3 January 2019
- Preceded by: Edris Ali Bhuyian
- Succeeded by: Syeda Zakia Noor Lipi

10th General Secretary of Bangladesh Awami League
- In office 6 January 2009 – 23 October 2016
- Preceded by: Abdul Jalil
- Succeeded by: Obaidul Quader

Personal details
- Born: 1 January 1952 Mymensingh, East Bengal, Pakistan
- Died: 3 January 2019 (aged 67) Bangkok, Thailand
- Party: Bangladesh Awami League
- Spouse: Sheila Thakur
- Parent: Syed Nazrul Islam (father)

Sayed Ashraful Islam (c. 1952 – 3 January 2019) was a Bangladesh Awami League politician. He was the general secretary of the Bangladesh Awami League party. He served as a member of parliament and minister of public administration of the government of Bangladesh. Ashraful Islam also served for a time as minister of local government and rural development and co-operatives.

== Early life ==
Sayed Ashraful Islam was the eldest son of Syed Nazrul Islam, acting president of the Mujibnagar government in 1971. Ashraful Islam was a Mukti Bahini member during the Bangladesh Liberation War of 1971. He was involved in politics from the student life. He became the general secretary of the greater Mymensingh District Chhatra League and assistant publicity secretary of the central unit. He also worked as the acting general secretary of the Awami League after the arrest of its general secretary, Abdul Jalil. He was also working as the spokesman of the Awami League before serving as general secretary of the Awami League.

== Political career ==
In 1975, following the killing of Ashraful Islam's father in prison along with three other national leaders, he immigrated to the United Kingdom and lived in the London Borough of Tower Hamlets. Whilst living in Tower Hamlets, he was involved in Bangladeshi community activism and played an important role in the formation of Bangladesh Youth League (BYL). He was elected as an education secretary of the Federation of Bangladeshi Youth Organisation (FBYO) and worked at an education project based at Montefiore Centre in Tower Hamlets. Before immigrating to the United Kingdom, he completed his Higher Secondary Certificate (HSC) in 1973 from Mymensingh Zillah School. He returned to Bangladesh in 1996 and was elected member of parliament (MP) from his home constituency, Kishoreganj Sadar, in the 7th national elections of Bangladesh. He was elected an MP in the 2001 election as well. He worked as a member of the parliamentary standing committee on the foreign ministry. His electoral pledges include building up developed road and rail links from Dhaka to his hometown, Kishoreganj. He was part of a committee to study the judicial pay scale. Ashraful was re-elected from the Kishoreganj-1 constituency in the 11th parliamentary election, which was held on 30 December 2018.

== Controversy ==
Ashraful Islam questioned the role of Bangladesh in the Saudi-led military alliance against terror. He has criticised Bangladesh Bank and the Finance Ministry for the high rate of interest.

=== Criticism of Muhammad Yunus ===
Ashraful Islam is known for his attacks on Nobel laureate and Grameen Bank founder Muhammad Yunus. In 2012, while addressing a program for farmers of cooperatives, he said:

His (Yunus') basic subject is economics and he introduced microcredit programme, but did not get Nobel Prize in economics, He (Yunus) got Nobel Prize for Peace. But which war has he stopped with his activities and in which continent has he established peace through his microcredit program?

These days many of us know how one gets Nobel Prize. There are some countries in the world and a person's popularity increases once one has chips, cheese sandwiches and white wine in those countries.

=== Criticism of American diplomats ===
Ashraful Islam also criticised American diplomats. In the same gathering where he criticised Muhammad Yunus, he criticised Secretary of State Hillary Clinton for a TV program on ATN Bangla, alleging that she and the moderator, Munni Saha, were "attempting to undermine Bangladesh."

In 2014, in a meeting in Khulna, Ashraful Islam called the US Assistant Secretary for South and Central Asian Affairs, Nisha Desai Biswal, who was on an official visit to Bangladesh, "a minister of two pennies," and added that said she "cannot change the power in Bangladesh." On the same occasion, he belittled the US Ambassador to Bangladesh, Dan Mozena, calling him "maid Marzina."

== Illness and death ==
In November 2018, Ashraful Islam was diagnosed with stage-4 lung cancer. He died on 3 January 2019 in Bangkok, Thailand.
