= Banagram, Kamarhati, Nadia =

Banagram Kamarhati Purbapara
- Village
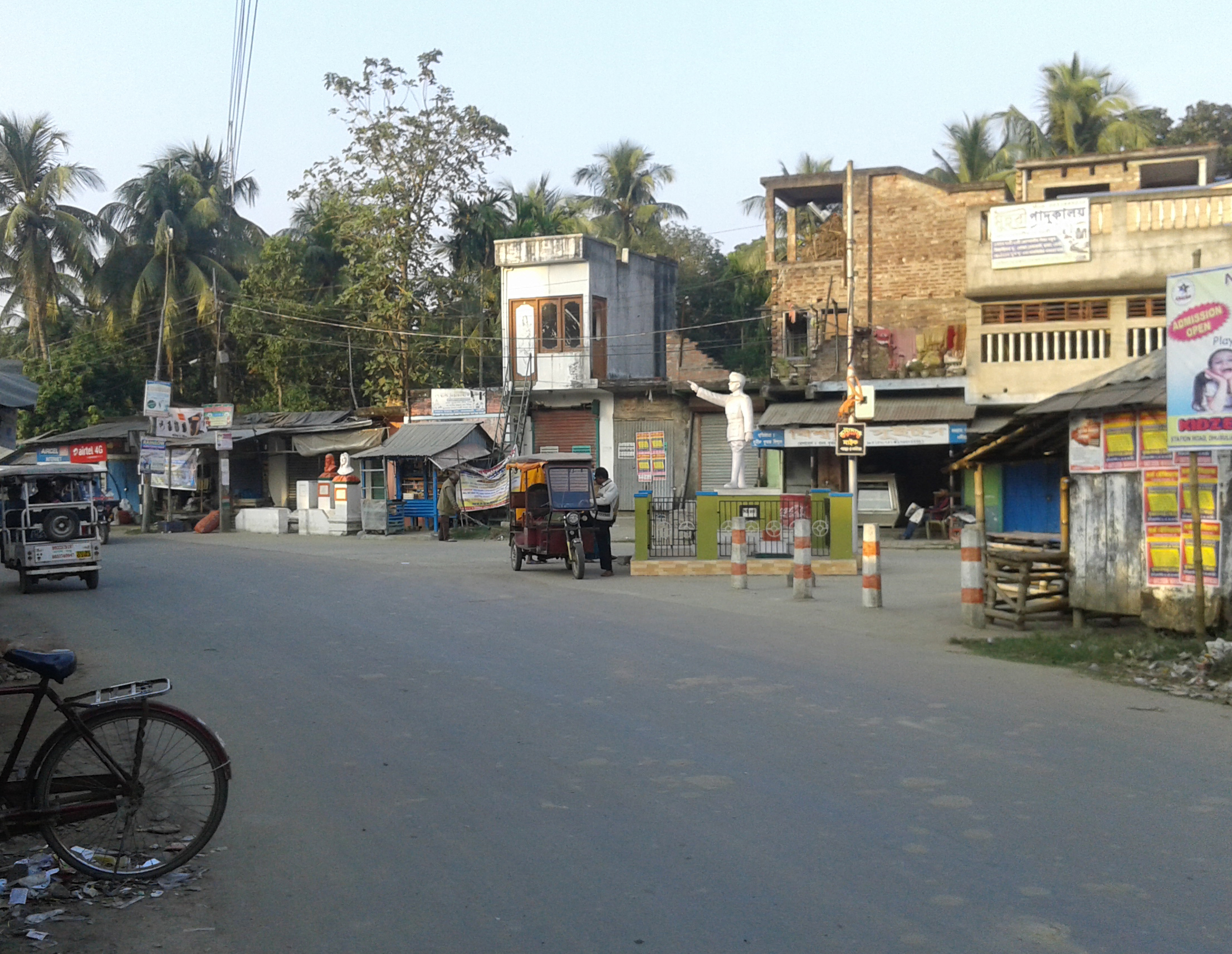
- Banagram Bazar near Krishnanagar Dharmada Road

- Location in West Bengal, India
- Coordinates: 23.520778°N 88.430722°E
- Country: India
- State: West Bengal
- District: Nadia

Languages
  - Official: Bengali, English
- Time zone: UTC+5:30 (IST)
- PIN: 741154
- Telephone code: 91 3472
- Gram Panchayet: Sadhanpara 1 No. Gram Panchayet

Banagram is a small locality or village in Krishnanagar II CD Block in Krishnanagar Sadar subdivision of Nadia district of West Bengal, India beside Kamarhati, Nadia. Three Hindu Temple, one monastery, Banagram Radha Madhob Seba Ashram are there. To align the children towards books the young generation of this village organizes a book fair named Banagram Book Fair from the year 2019 with the financial help of the people of the village. This book fair has taken place in the minds of the people without any government help.

== History ==
Most of the people migrated to Banagram from Bangladesh at the time of the partition of India in 1947. According to senior villagers of this locality, before 1947 population of this area was very poor and it was full of trees and it is spinney like.

== Geography ==
Banagram is located at 23°31′15″N 88°25′51″E. Most of the land is used for cultivation. The main crops of Banagram are rice, mustard, jute and marigold flower.

== Police station ==
Dhubulia Police Station serves the area of Banagram. The total area covered by the police station is 134.74 km^{2}.

== Post Office ==
Post Office of Banagram is Kamarhati Branch Post Office and postal code is 741154.

== Economy ==
Most of the people of Banagram depends on Cultivation. Also, many of them earn from Cottage industry. Recently a IT firm named Gluonweb - Web and Technology Developer is established to provides services in the area of information technology and to grow interest about technology among the youngsters.

== Education ==
In Banagram there is a primary school named, Banagram Board Primary School. And there is also a Nursery KG School namely Banagram Vidyarohi Sishu Niketan. For higher education students have to go neighbour village Kamarhati Chittaranjan High School
