= Pakundia Adarsha Mohila College =

Women's college in Bangladesh

- পাকুন্দিয়া আদর্শ মহিলা কলেজ
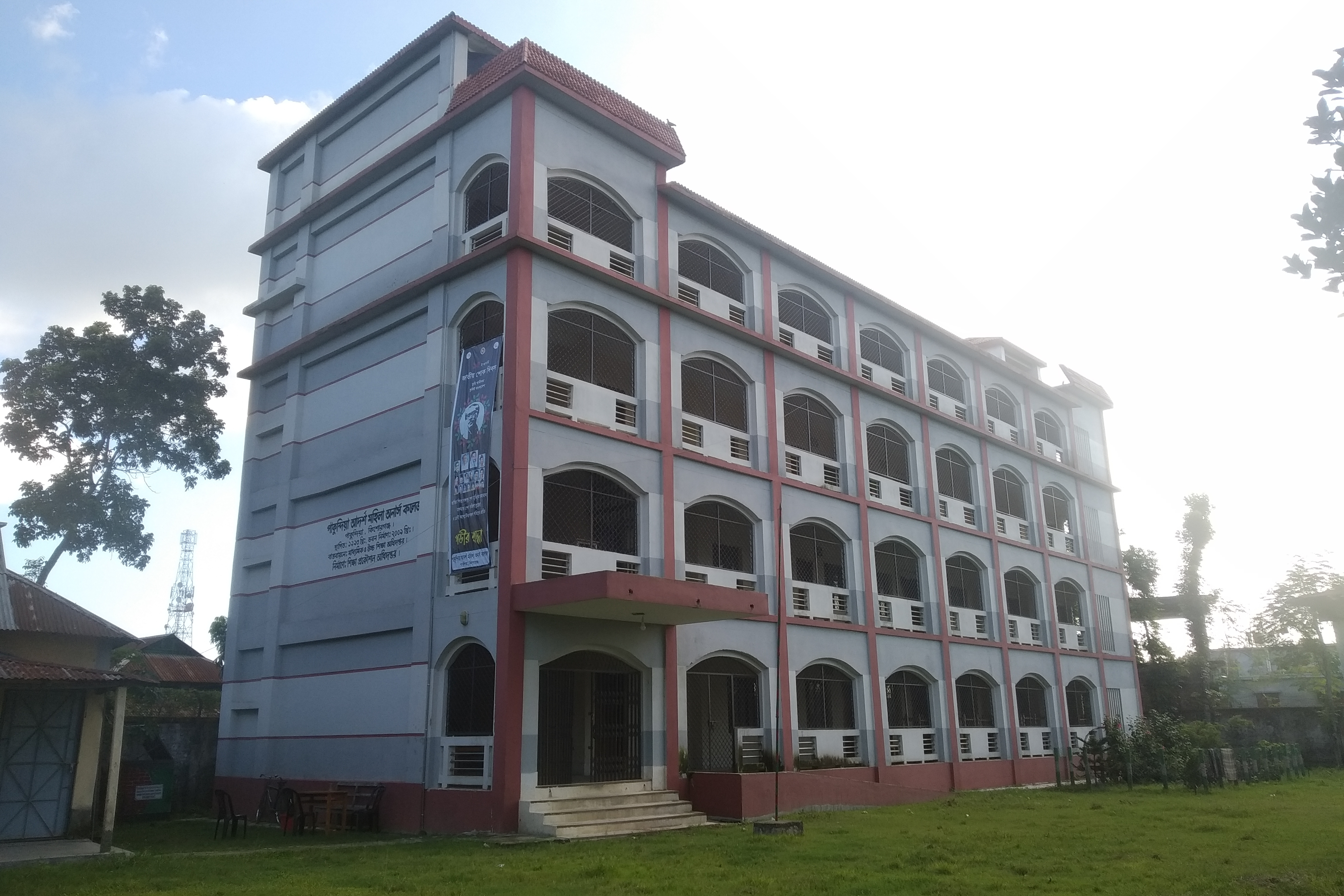
- The main academic building of Pakundia Adarsha Mohila College
- Motto: শিক্ষা-ই-শক্তি, জ্ঞান-ই-আলো
- Motto in English: Education is power, knowledge is light
- Type: Non-government higher secondary and university-affiliated women's college
- Established: 1993; 33 years ago
- Founders: ABM Zahidul Haq
- Academic affiliations: Dhaka Education Board; National University of Bangladesh
- Principal: Md. Muzzammal Haque
- Location: Pakundia Municipality, 2326, Bangladesh; 24°19′57.619″N 90°40′52.007″E
- Campus: Urban, 2.93 acres (1.19 hectares)
- EIIN: 110616

Pakundia Adarsha Mohila College (Bengali: পাকুন্দিয়া আদর্শ মহিলা কলেজ) is a higher secondary and undergraduate college for girls in Pakundia Upazila, Kishoreganj District, Bangladesh. The educational institution was established in 1993 as the first women's degree college in Pakundia. It offers the 11th–12th grade and undergraduate education. National University affiliated degree (pass) and honours courses are available in this college.

The college is located in the Pakundia Municipality area. It is controlled by the Board of Intermediate and Secondary Education, Dhaka. Its campus is spread across nearly three acres of land.

== History ==
Former Bangladesh Deputy Minister of Shipping and Jatiya Sangsad member ABM Zahidul Haq founded the college in 1993. It started journey as a non-government educational institution and later gained the MPO status. Its establishment marked the founding of the first girls' degree college in Pakundia.

== Administration ==
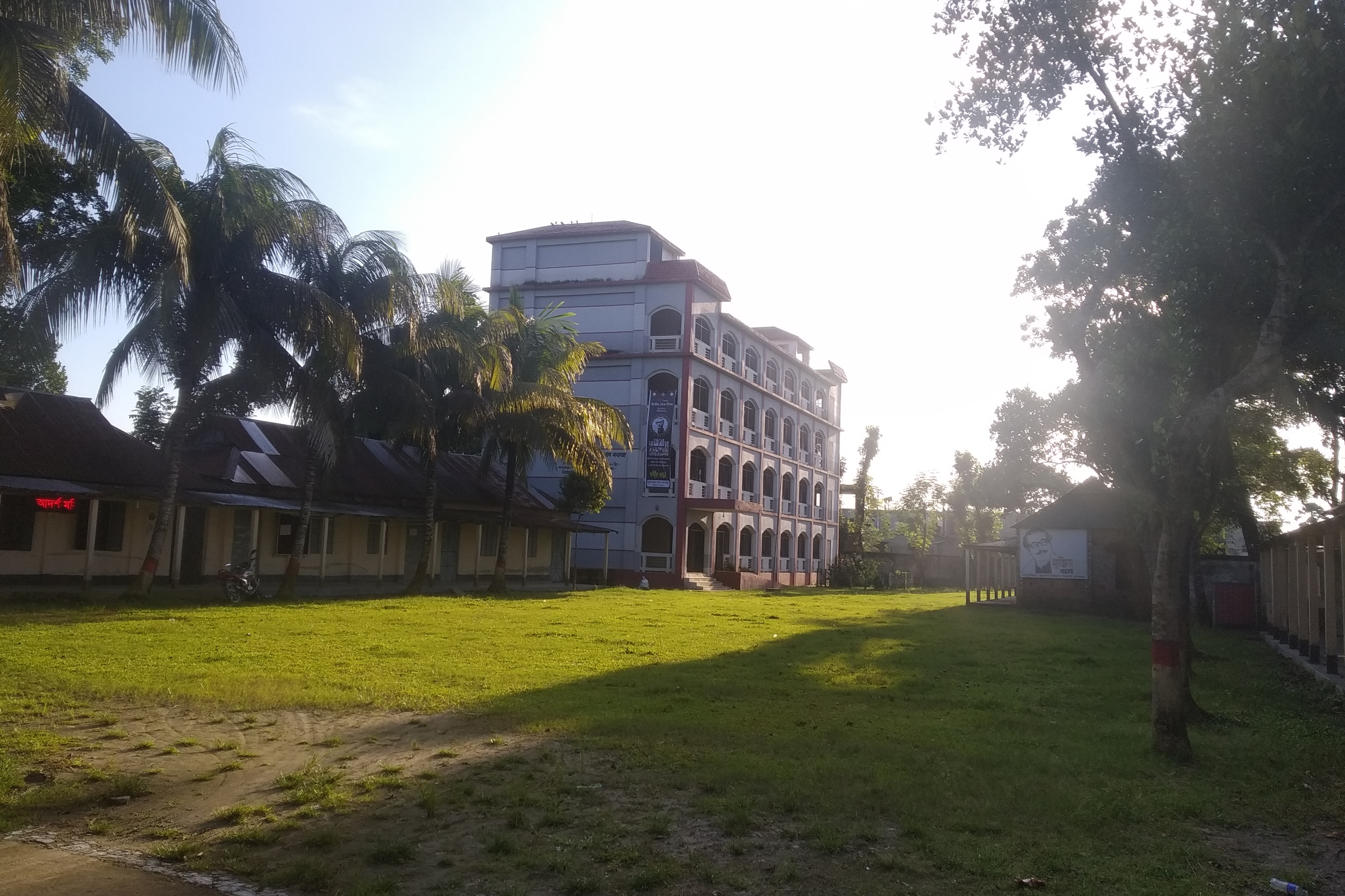
Pakundia Adarsha Mohila College premises

The college is under the control of the Dhaka Education Board and affiliated to the National University of Bangladesh. Its Educational Institution Identification Number (EIIN) is 110616. The current principal of the college is Md. Muzzammal Haque. Before him, Md. Jasim Uddin served as the principal of the college.

List of principals
Serial No.	Name	Held office
1	Md. Jasim Uddin	Until 2018
2	Md. Muzzammal Haque	2018–present

== Academics ==
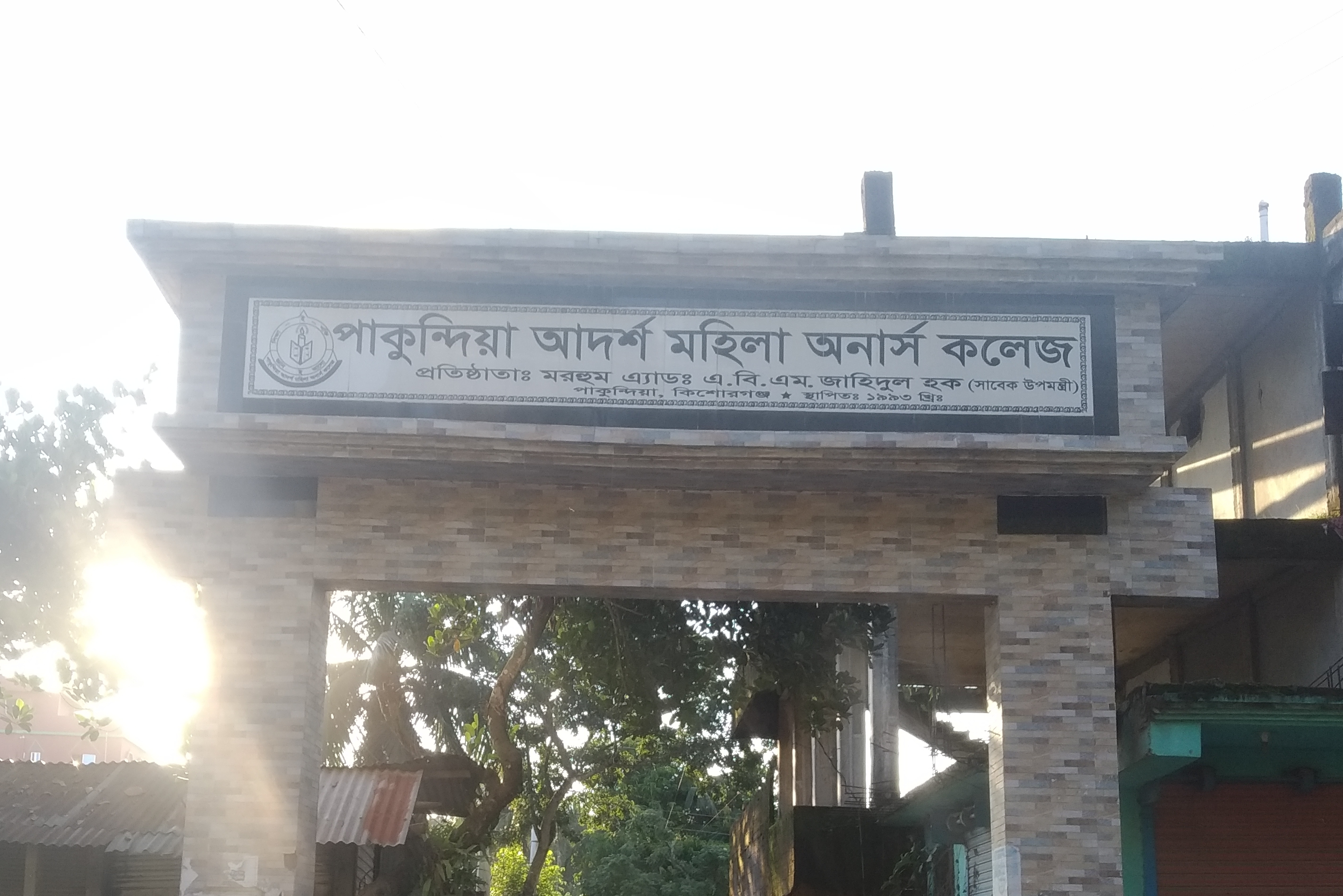
Pakundia Adarsha Mohila College entrance

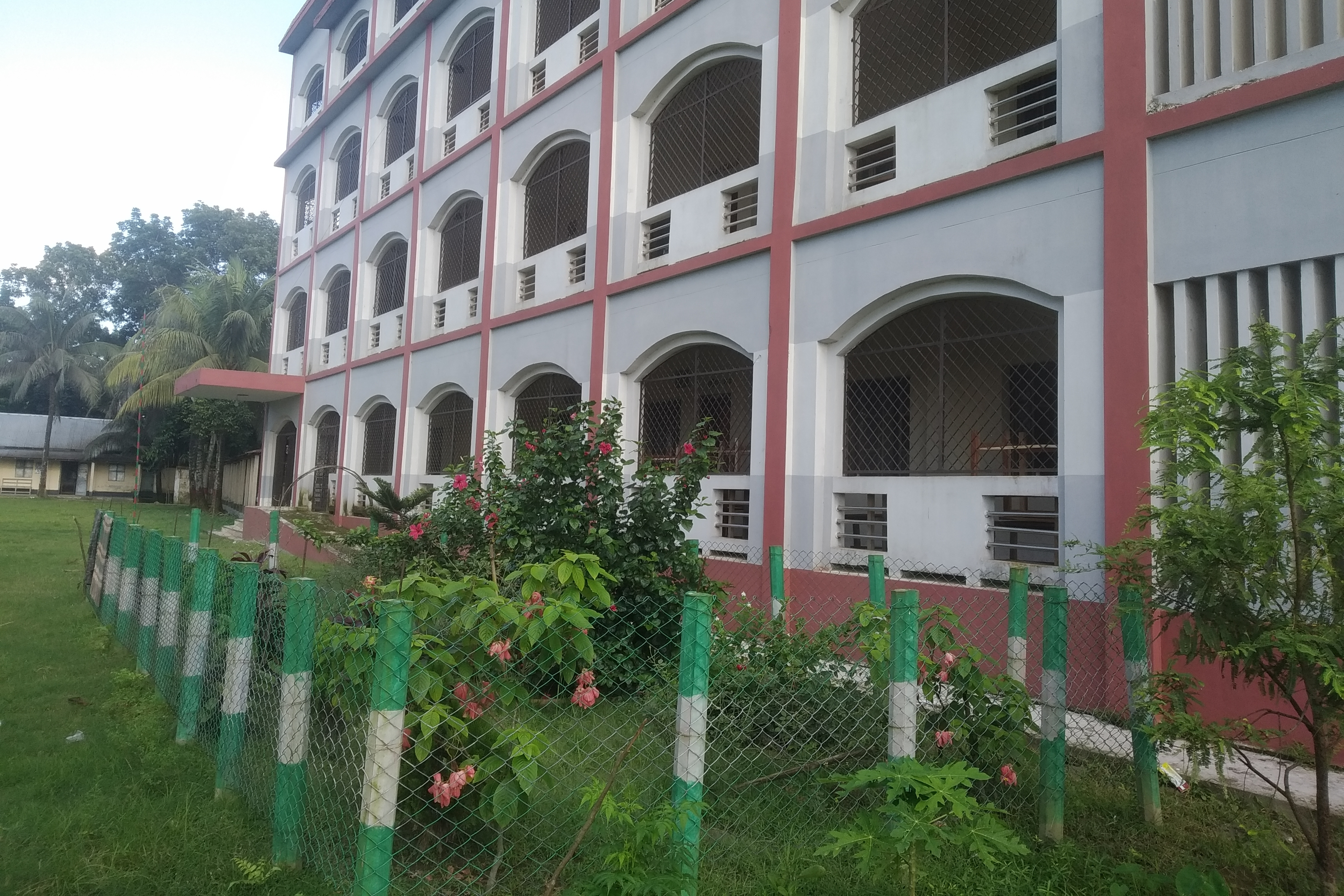
Flower garden beside the main academic building

=== Admission ===
Only girls are allowed to be admitted to the college in the 11th grade and undergraduate level. The 11th grade admission process starts right after the publication of the Secondary School Certificate (SSC) results and students are selected on the basis of their SSC results. A maximum of 300 students can be admitted in the 11th grade under the Dhaka Education Board in this college.

For the National University affiliated programs, students are selected on the basis of their SSC and Higher Secondary Certificate (HSC) results.

=== Curriculum ===
- Higher Secondary Certificate (HSC):
  - Science
  - Humanities
  - Business studies
- Degree (pass) courses:
  - BA (pass)
  - BSS (pass)
- Honours courses:
  - Bangla
  - Social work
- HSC (BM) under the Bangladesh Technical Education Board:
  - Accounting
  - Computer operation

== Extracurricular activities ==
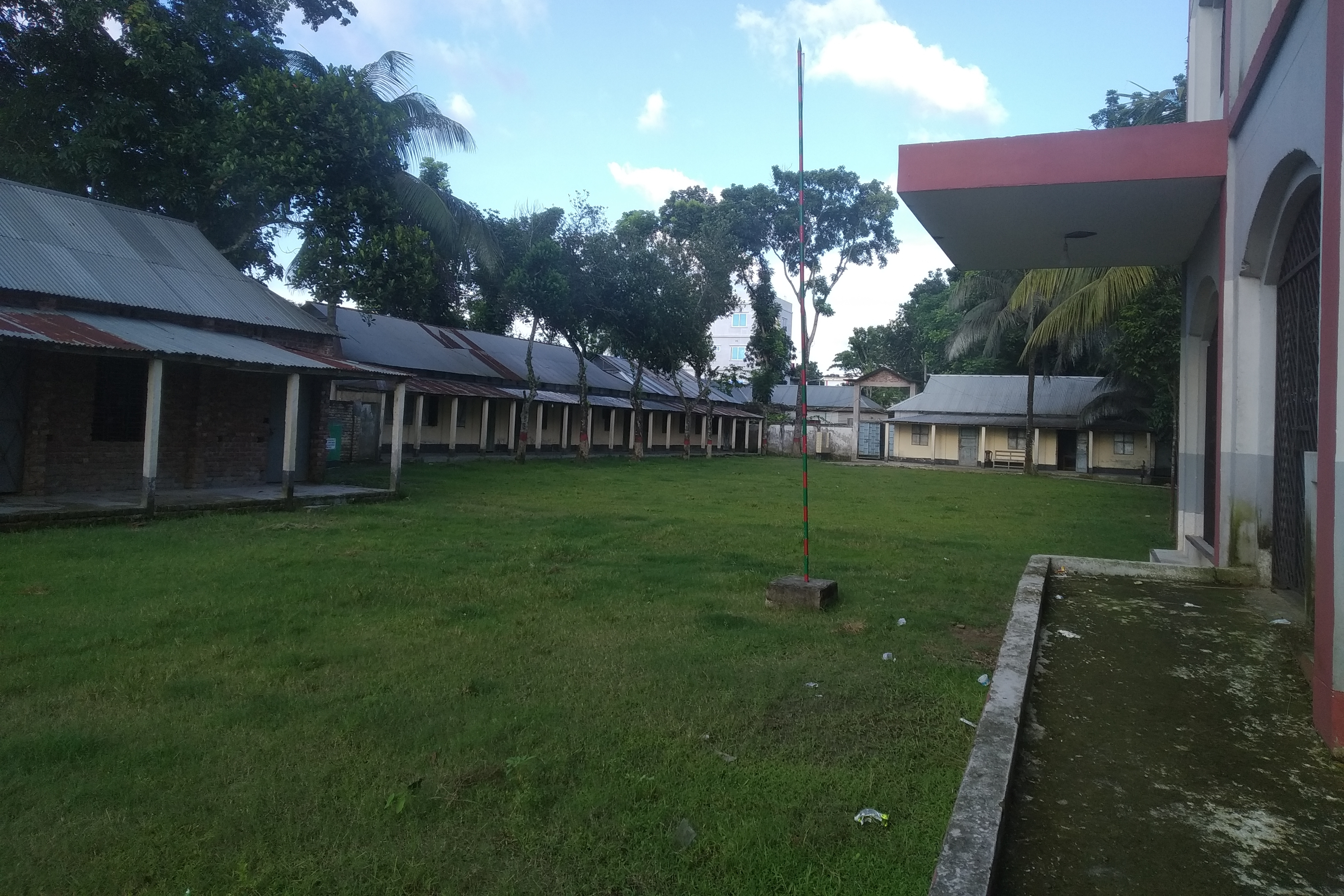
Pakundia Adarsha Mohila College field

Pakundia Adarsha Mohila College organizes various extracurricular programs every year besides academic activities. The college has an auditorium at which different kinds of seminars are held throughout the year, including seminars on higher education, and seminars on the Bangladesh Liberation War. Other extracurricular activities include holding freshers' receptions, organizing food festivals, and holding farewell ceremonies.

== See also ==
- Directorate of Secondary and Higher Education
- Education in Bangladesh
- Ministry of Education (Bangladesh)
- National Curriculum and Textbook Board
- Secondary and Higher Education Division
