= General Secretary of Bangladesh Awami League =

Political post

- Bangladesh Awami League badge

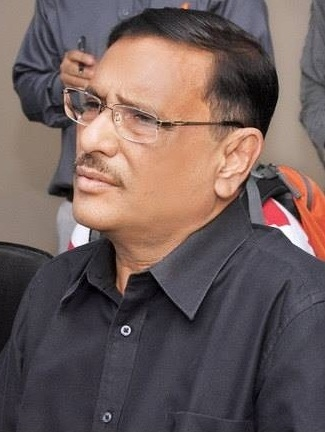
- Incumbent; Obaidul Quader since 23 October 2016
- Type: Executive person of party
- Reports to: Executive committee
- Term length: 4 year
- Inaugural holder: Shamsul Huq
- Formation: 1949

The general secretary of Bangladesh Awami League is the executive person of this political organization of Bangladesh. He gave orders or advice for all departmental functions as the secretary of the organization. He took care of all matters, from the appointment or dismissal of the staff of the organization to the approval of the executive of the organization. In addition to verifying various documents including election expenditures during the election, he also delegates responsibility among the party's organizational editors in consultation with the party chairman.

== List of officeholders ==
Portrait	Name	Assumed office	Left office	President served under
	Shamsul Huq	23 June 1949	1953	Abdul Hamid Khan Bhashani
	Sheikh Mujibur Rahman	1953	1966	Abdul Hamid Khan Bhashani; Huseyn Shaheed Suhrawardy; Abdur Rashid Tarkabagish
	Tajuddin Ahmad	1966	1972	Sheikh Mujibur Rahman
	Zillur Rahman	1972	1975	Sheikh Mujibur Rahman; A. H. M. Qamaruzzaman
	Abdur Razzaq	1978	1982	Abdul Malek Ukil; Sheikh Hasina
	Syeda Sajeda Chowdhury	1982	1987	Sheikh Hasina
	Zillur Rahman	1992	2002	Sheikh Hasina
	Abdul Jalil	2002	2009	Sheikh Hasina
	Sayed Ashraful Islam	2009	2016	Sheikh Hasina
	Obaidul Quader	2016	2024	Sheikh Hasina

== See also ==
- Bangladesh Awami League
