= Narsunda River =

River in Bangladesh

Coordinates: 24°27′44″N 90°57′56″E

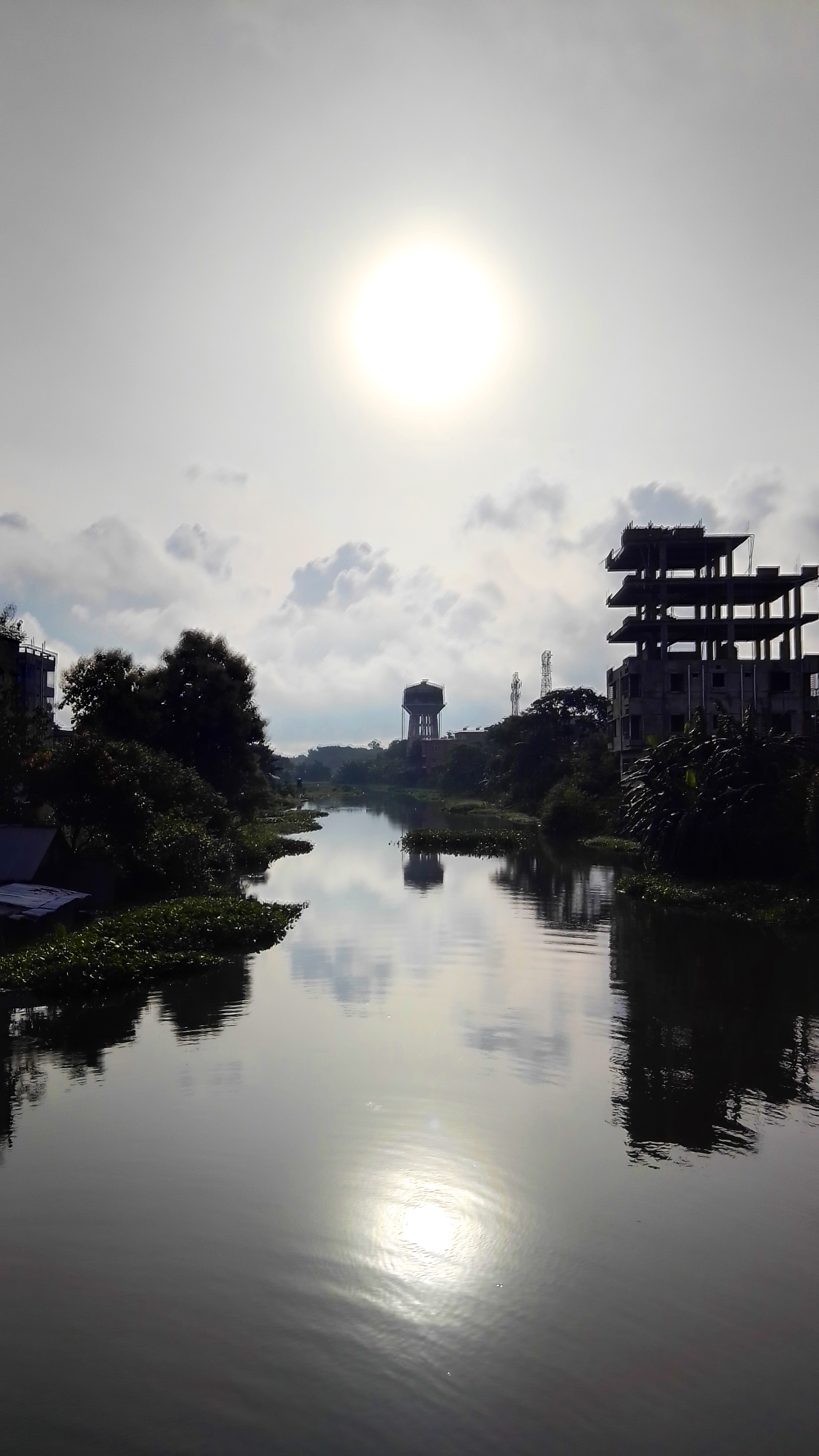
Narsunda River in Kishoreganj, Bangladesh

Narsunda is a river located at Kishoreganj District in Bangladesh. Narsunda River is created from Brahmaputra River at Hossainpur Upazila. After the creation of the river, its course take it through Jangalia Union, Pakundia Upazila and through Kishoreganj town and beside Govt. Gurudayal College. Famous writer Nirad C. Chaudhuri mentioned this river in his autobiography, The Autobiography of an Unknown Indian. Length of this river is around 60 km.
