= Kishoreganj Sadar Upazila =

Upazila in Dhaka Division, Bangladesh

Kishoreganj Sadar কিশোরগঞ্জ সদর
- Upazila
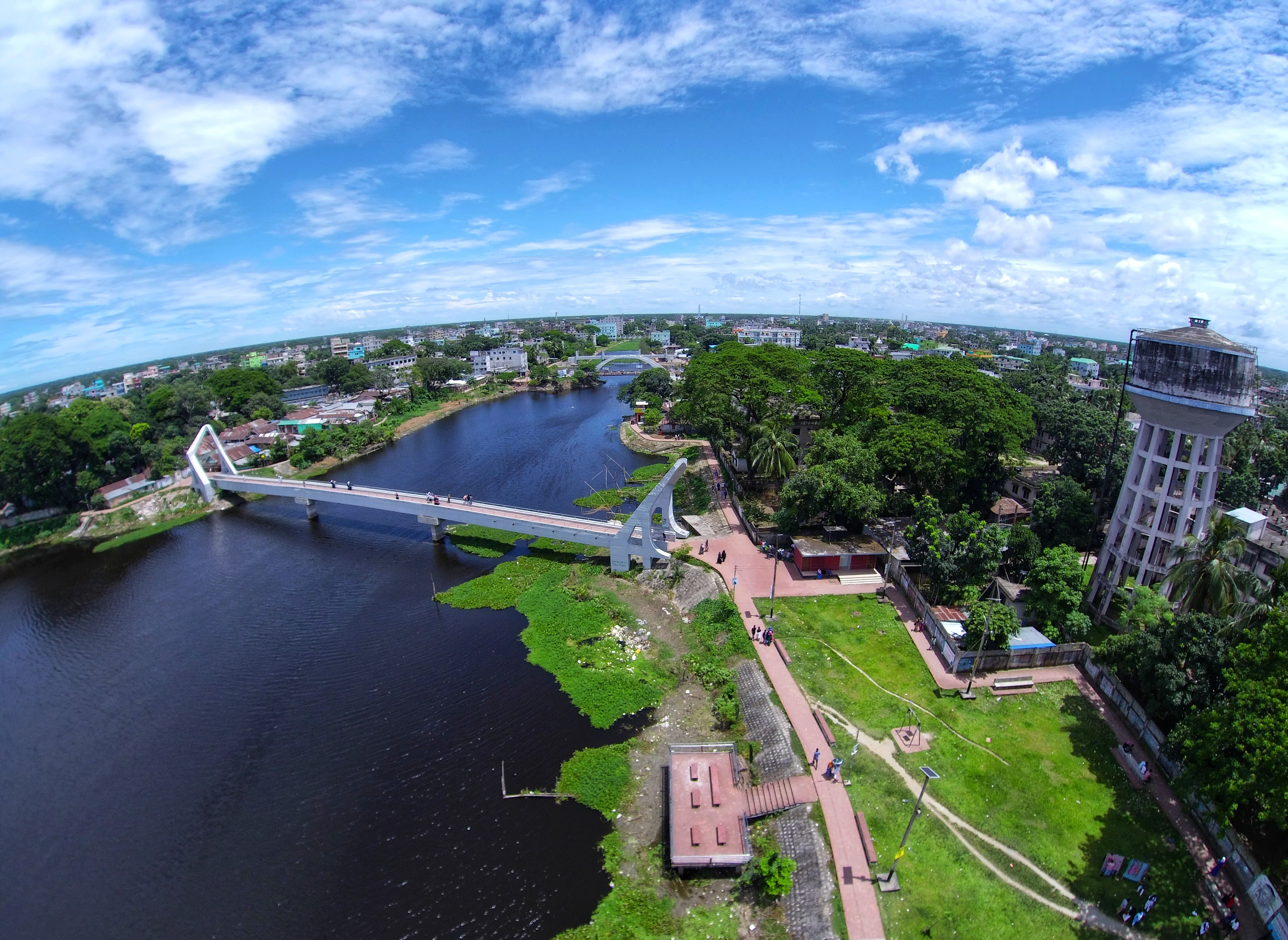
- Narsunda River View Of Kishoreganj City

- Map of Kishoreganj Sadar upazila in Kishoreganj District, Dhaka division
- Coordinates: 24°26′N 90°47′E
- Country: Bangladesh
- Division: Dhaka
- District: Kishoreganj
- Headquarters: Kishoreganj

Area
  - Total: 193.72 km^{2} (74.80 sq mi)

Population (2022)
  - Total: 506,873
  - Density: 2,616.5/km^{2} (6,776.8/sq mi)
- Time zone: UTC+6 (BST)
- Postal code: 2300
- Area code: 0941
- Website: kishoreganjsadar.kishoreganj.gov.bd

Kishoreganj Sadar Upazila mauza geocode map

Kishoreganj Sadar (Bengali: কিশোরগঞ্জ সদর) is an upazila of Kishoreganj District in Dhaka Division, Bangladesh. It is best known as the home upazila of Syed Nazrul Islam, once an acting President of Bangladesh.

== Geography ==
Kishoreganj Sadar is located at 24.4333°N 90.7833°E. It has a total area 193.72 km^{2}.

Kishoreganj Sadar Upazila (Kishoreganj district) is bounded by Nandail upazila of Mymensingh District on the north, Pakundia and Katiadi upazilas on the south, Karimganj and Tarail upazilas on the east and Hossainpur and Nandail upazilas on the west. The principal river is the Narsunda.

== Demographics ==
Religions in Kishoreganj Sadar Upazila (2022)
Religion	Percent
Islam	95.14%
Hinduism	4.83%
Other or not stated	0.03%

According to the 2022 Bangladeshi census, Kishoreganj Sadar Upazila had 117,572 households and a population of 506,873. 10.16% of the population were under 5 years of age. Kishoreganj Sadar had a literacy rate (age 7 and over) of 73.58%: 74.17% for males and 73.03% for females, and a sex ratio of 95.93 males for every 100 females. 171,650 (33.86%) lived in urban areas.

According to the 2011 Census of Bangladesh, Kishoreganj Sadar Upazila had 89,863 households and a population of 414,208. 106,611 (25.74%) were under 10 years of age. Kishoreganj Sadar had a literacy rate (age 7 and over) of 48.94%, compared to the national average of 51.8%, and a sex ratio of 1020 females per 1000 males. 103,798 (25.06%) lived in urban areas.

As of the 1991 Bangladesh census, Kishoreganj Sadar had a population of 300,337. Males constituted 51.52% of the population, females 48.48%. This upazila's population of eighteen and older was 149,926. Kishoreganj Sadar had an average literacy rate of 28.3% (7+ years). The national average was 32.4% literate.

== Administration ==
Kishoreganj Upazila is divided into Kishoreganj Municipality and 11 union parishads: Baulai, Binnati, Chauddasata, Danapatali, Jasodal, Korsha Kariail, Latibabad, Mahinanda, Maijkhapan, Maria, and Rashidabad. The union parishads are subdivided into 110 mauzas and 210 villages.

Kishoreganj Municipality is subdivided into 9 wards and 56 mahallas.

== Education ==
According to Banglapedia, Kishoregonj Government Boys' High School, which was founded in 1881 is a notable secondary school.

Gurudayal Government College or Gurudayal College is a public college under National University located in Kishoreganj Municipality, Kishoreganj Sadar Upazila. Established in 1943, the college has produced a president of Bangladesh. Abdul Hamid, 16th president of Bangladesh was a student of this college.

== See also ==
- Egarosindur
- Sholakia
- Sholmara Killing Field
- Upazilas of Bangladesh
- Districts of Bangladesh
- Divisions of Bangladesh
- Thanas of Bangladesh
- Villages of Bangladesh
- List of villages in Bangladesh
- Union councils of Bangladesh
- Administrative geography of Bangladesh
- Executive magistrate (Bangladesh)
