= Bazlul Karim Falu =

Bangladeshi politician (died 2019)

- বজলুল করিম ফালু

Member of Parliament for Kishoreganj-1
- In office 1988–1990
- Preceded by: A K M Shamsul Haque
- Succeeded by: A B M Zahidul Haque

Personal details
- Born: 1950/51
- Died: 20 April 2019
- Party: Bangladesh Nationalist Party
- Occupation: Politician

Bazlul Karim Falu was a Bangladeshi politician. He was a freedom fighter. He was elected as MP of Kishoreganj-1 constituency in 1988. He died on 20 April 2019 at the age of 68.
