= Hossainpur Upazila =

Upazila in Dhaka Division, Bangladesh

Hossainpur হোসেনপুর
- Upazila
- Hossainpur upazila
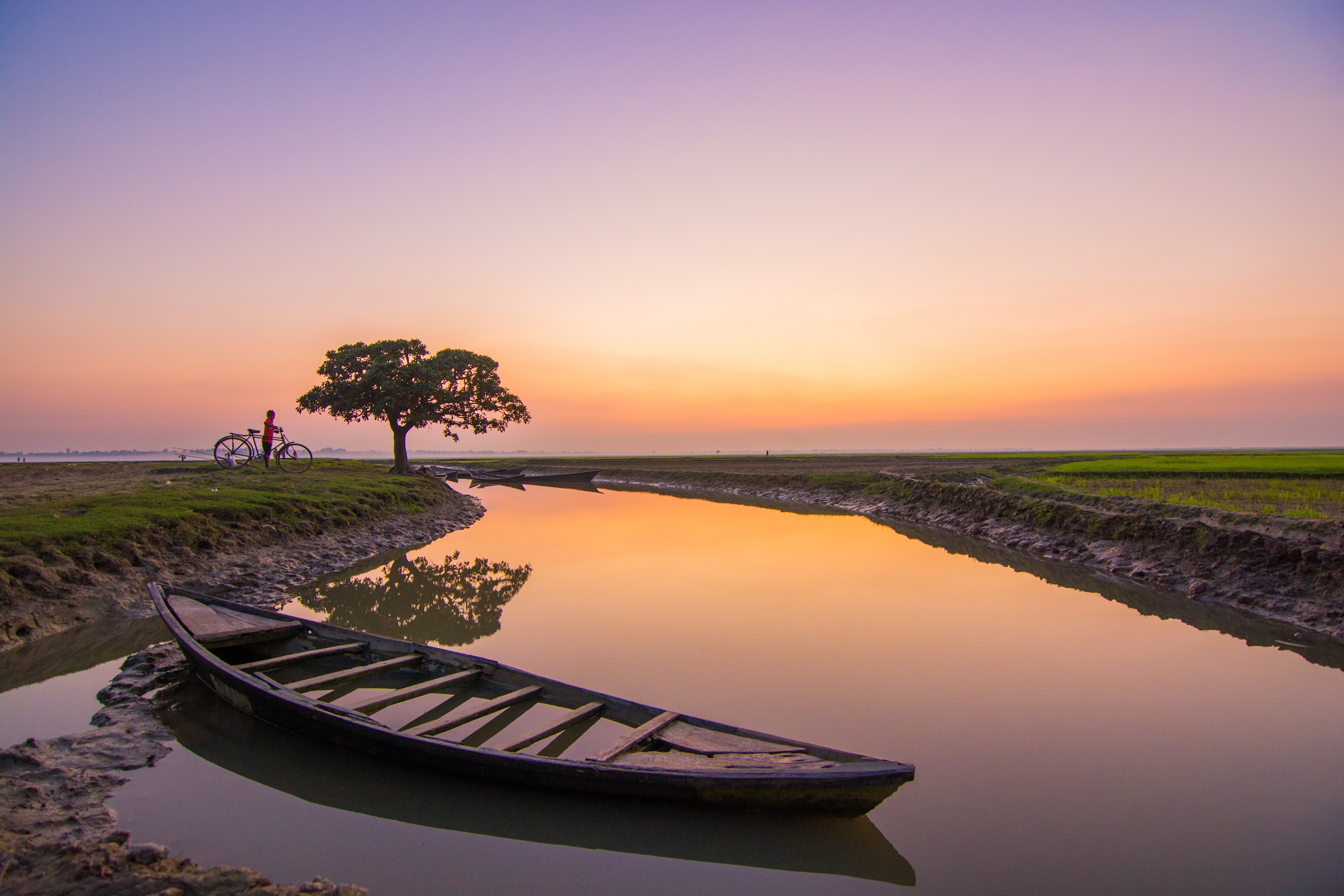
- Old Brahmaputra River at Hossainpur

- Coordinates: 24°25′N 90°39′E
- Country: Bangladesh
- Division: Dhaka
- District: Kishoreganj

Government
  - Upazila Chairman: Incumbent
  - Upazila vice chairman: Incumbent

Area
  - Total: 121.29 km^{2} (46.83 sq mi)

Population (2022)
  - Total: 201,897
  - Density: 1,664.6/km^{2} (4,311.2/sq mi)
- Time zone: UTC+6 (Dhaka (+06) BST)
- Postal code: 2320
- Website: hossainpur.kishoreganj.gov.bd

Hossainpur (Bengali: হোসেনপুর) is an upazila of Kishoreganj District in Dhaka Division, Bangladesh.

Hossainpur Upazila mauza geocode map

== History ==
In 1781, James Reel identified the boundaries of three major areas of the Kishoreganj district in the geographical map of undivided Bangladesh. The name of a town is Hossainpur. It was shown as the most important township of ancient Kishoreganj on James Venlen's grid map.

Under the Mughal Emperor Bahadur Shah, this area was named for Alauddin Husain Shah. Hossainpur Upazila was surrounded by the river Narasunda at the southern end of Brahmaputra river at the western end. In the full age of the river, this township was well known in this area due to the expansion of businesses and commerce. Boats often sailed on the outskirts of Hossainpur.

Because of the easy flow of rivers, the British East India Company set up blue cells for indigo cultivation in the village of Pitalganj in Upazila. Even today, the remains of the demolished blue house in Pitalganj village are silent. In the oppression of the blue tax, the people of this population rebelled against the British.

== Geography ==
Hossainpur is located at 24.4167°N 90.6500°E. It has 29,486 households and a total area of 121.29 km^{2}. This is only 14 km distance from the Kishoreganj district headquarters. Hossainpur is bordered by Nandail Upazila of Mymensingh district on the north, Kishoreganj Sadar Upazila on the east, Pakundia Upazila on the south, and Gafargaon Upazila of Mymensingh district on the west.

=== Rivers ===
In this upazila, there is the main river named the Brahmaputra. From Kishoreganj, a river flows in this area, which is known as Narsunda. Hossainpur is situated on the bank of the Brahmaputra.

== Demographics ==
According to the 2022 Bangladeshi census, Hossainpur Upazila had 49,120 households and a population of 201,897. 10.61% of the population were under 5 years of age. Hossainpur had a literacy rate (age 7 and over) of 67.92%: 68.25% for males and 67.64% for females, and a sex ratio of 90.53 males for every 100 females. 31,334 (15.52%) lived in urban areas.

According to the 2011 Census of Bangladesh, Hossainpur Upazila had 41,376 households and a population of 183,884. 50,504 (27.47%) were under 10 years of age. Hossainpur had a literacy rate (age 7 and over) of 41.85%, compared to the national average of 51.8%, and a sex ratio of 1,038 females per 1,000 males. 23,118 (12.57%) lived in urban areas.

According to the 1991 Bangladesh census, Hossainpur had a population of 191,206. Males constituted 49% of the population, and females constituted 51%. The adult population was 72,824. Hossainpur had an average literacy rate of 23.1% (7+ years), while the national average is 32.4%.

=== Religion ===
Religions in Hossainpur Upazila (2022)
Religion	Percent
Islam	98.09%
Hinduism	1.90%
Other or not stated	0.01%

Nearly the entire population is Muslim, with a tiny Hindu minority. There are more than 370 mosques in the upazila and three temples. The main mosque in the upazila is Hossainpur Jame Masjid, with other mosques such as Hossainpur Upazila Jame Masjid, Thana Masjid, Murgi Mahal Masjid, and Court Masjid. For performing Eid prayer, it has a central Eidgah field located in Notunbazar. The main Hindu temples are Sree Sree Kuleshori Mandir, Sree Sree Narsinhg Jiur Akhra, and Sree Sree Kali Mandir.

== Administration ==
Hossainpur Upazila is divided into Hossainpur Municipality and six union parishads: Araibaria, Gobindapur, Jinari, Pumdi, Sahedal, and Sidhla. The union parishads are divided into 73 mauzas and 90 villages.

Hossainpur Municipality is subdivided into 9 wards and 16 mahallas.

Hossainpur Municipality was formed on 5 February 2006 with a total area of 5.46 km^{2} (2.18 square miles) of the largest part of Araibaria Union and parts of Sidla Union. The total population of the municipality is 28,206 (according to the 2011 census). 65.44% of the population is educated, 45% businessmen and 30% employers and agricultural, and 25% of the population works in other occupations.

== Education ==
As one of the most popular cities of Kishoreganj, Hossainpur has a good reputation regarding its educational system and growth. There are some historical and popular educational institutes in this upazila.

=== College ===
- Hossainpur Government College
- Hossainpur Adarsha Mohila Degree College
- Hossainpur Business Management College
- Hossainpur Technical College
- Hossainpur BM College

=== Secondary schools ===
- Hossainpur Government Model Pilot School & College
- Hossainpur Model Pilot Girls High School
- Hossainpur Adarsha High School
- Golachipa High School
- Hoglakandi High School
- Akbar Ali Technical School and College
- Piplakandi High School
- Pitalganj High School
- SRD High School
- Gobindhapur High School
- Lulikandi High School

=== Madrasahs ===
- Madhkhola Senior Fazil Madrasah
- Hossainpur Upazaila Sadar Dakhil Madrasah
- Ashutia Chamadia Dakhil Madrasah
- Gorbishudia Burapir Hossainia Dakhil Madrasah
- DS Sahedal Dakhil Madrasah
- Dahora Golpokor Par Fazil Madrasah

=== Others ===
There are also a few primary schools and kindergartens in this locality.

== See also ==
- Upazilas of Bangladesh
- Districts of Bangladesh
- Divisions of Bangladesh
- Administrative divisions of Bangladesh
