= Banagram Union, Katiadi =

Banagram Union বনগ্রাম
- Union Council
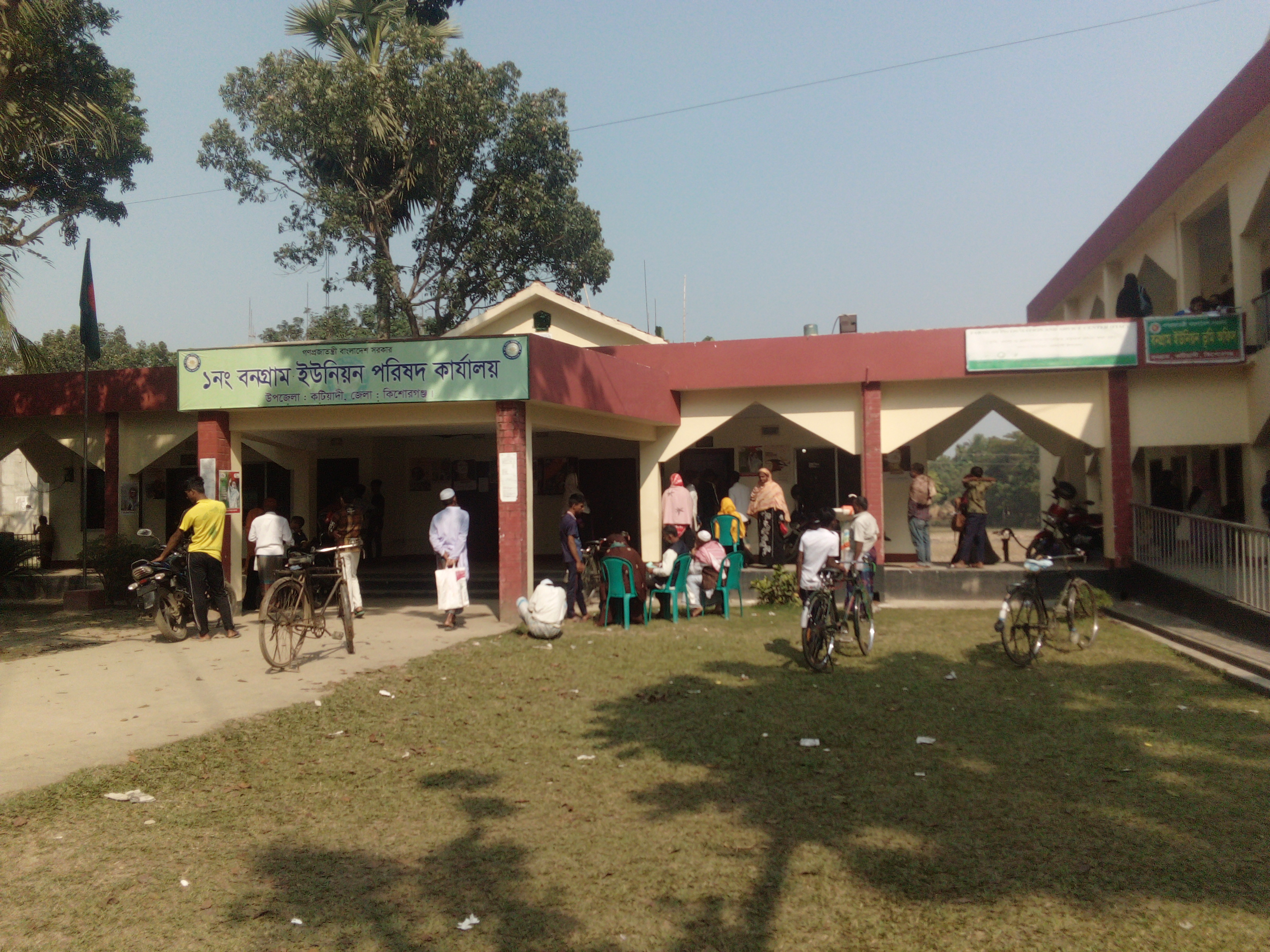
- A picture of Banagram Union Council

- Banagram Union in map
- Coordinates: 24.3399°N 90.7981°E
- Country: Bangladesh
- Upazila: Katiadi
- District: Kishoreganj

Government
  - Type: local government
  - Body: Bangladesh

Area
  - Total: 15 km^{2} (5.8 sq mi)

Population (2011)
  - Total: 35,248
- Time zone: UTC+6
- Postal code: 2330
- Website: www.banagramup.kishoreganj.gov.bd

Banagram Union is a union parishad of Katiadi Upazila under Kishoreganj District of Dhaka Division.
