= Pakundia Upazila =

Upazila in Kishoreganj District, Bangladesh

Pakundia পাকুন্দিয়া
- Upazila
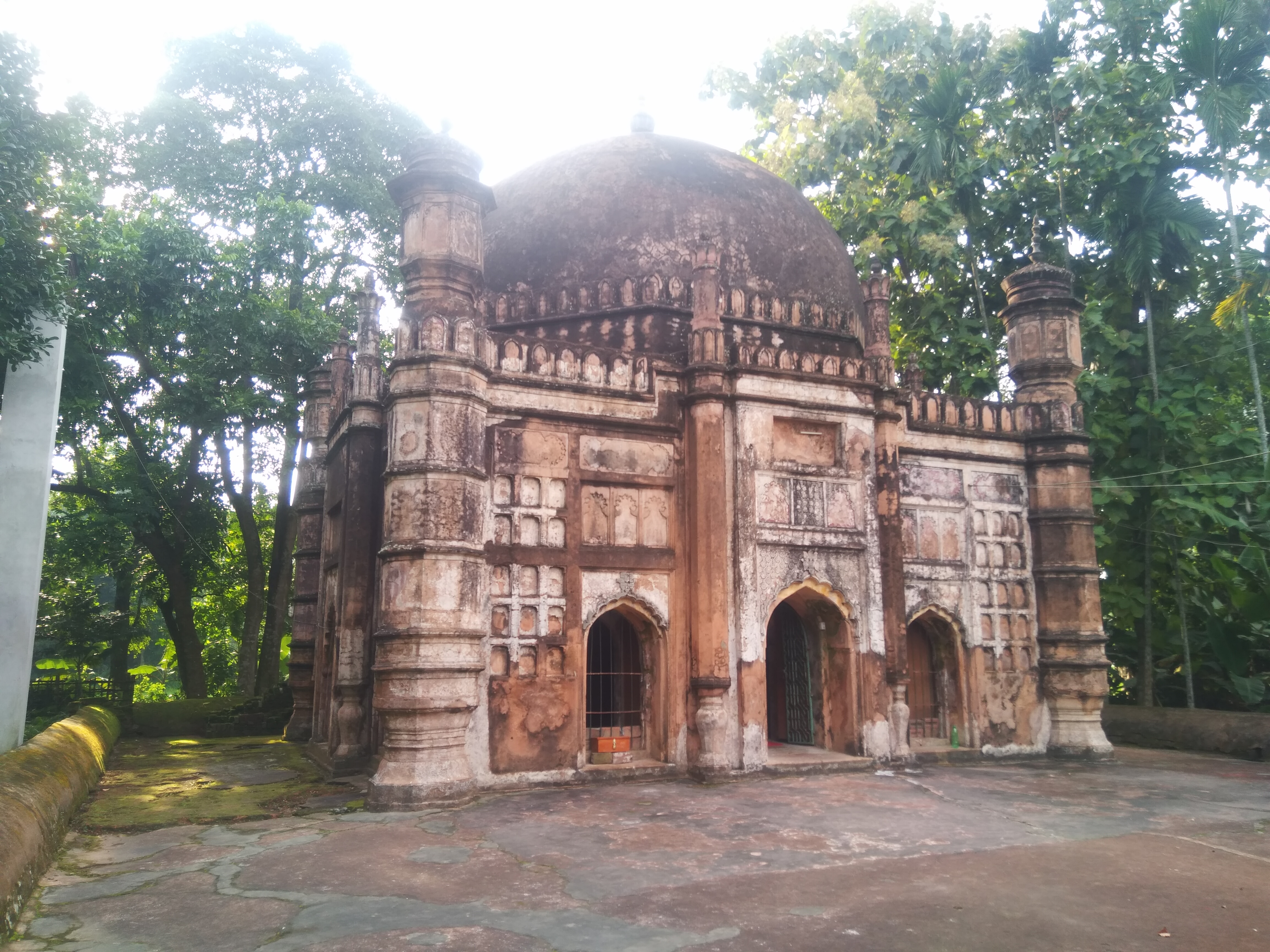
- Sheikh Mahmud Shah Mosque, Egarosindur

- Coordinates: 24°19′44″N 90°40′54″E
- Country: Bangladesh
- Division: Dhaka
- District: Kishoreganj
- Formed as thana: 1922; 104 years ago
- Turned into upazila: 1983; 43 years ago

Government
  - MP (Kishoreganj-2): [Md._Suhrab_Uddin]
  - Upazila Chairman: Emdadul Haque Juton

Area
  - Total: 180.53 km^{2} (69.70 sq mi)

Population (2011)
  - Total: 250,060
  - Density: 1,385.1/km^{2} (3,587.5/sq mi)
- Time zone: UTC+6 (BST)
- Postal code: 2326
- Website: pakundia.kishoreganj.gov.bd

Pakundia Upazila mauza geocode map

Pakundia (Bengali: পাকুন্দিয়া) is an upazila (subdistrict) in Kishoreganj District, Dhaka Division, Bangladesh. Its total land area is 180.52 square kilometres (69.70 square miles). It has a population of 237,218 residents. It was formed in 1922 as a thana. On 14 September 1983, it was turned into an upazila.

== Geography ==
Pakundia is located at 24°19′44″N 90°40′54″E. It has 57,399 households and total area 180.53 square kilometres (69.70 square miles). It is bounded by the Old Brahmaputra and Gafargaon to its west, Kapasia to its southwest, Monohardi Upazila of Narsingdi District to its south, Katiadi Upazila to the southeast, Kishoreganj Sadar to the north, and Hossainpur Upazila to its northwest. The Old Brahmaputra is the main river of Pakundia. Inside the upazila, another river named Singua flows from Bill Moisber through Kaliachapara and joins Ghorautra river with Nikli in the Bhati area of the district. Other important bodies of water in Pakundia include the Narsunda River, Banar, Mangalahat as well as the beels of Padmakuri, Bhara, Kahetardia, Chaityakabali, Baranala, Bejurnala, Naothaghya and Digha.

== History ==
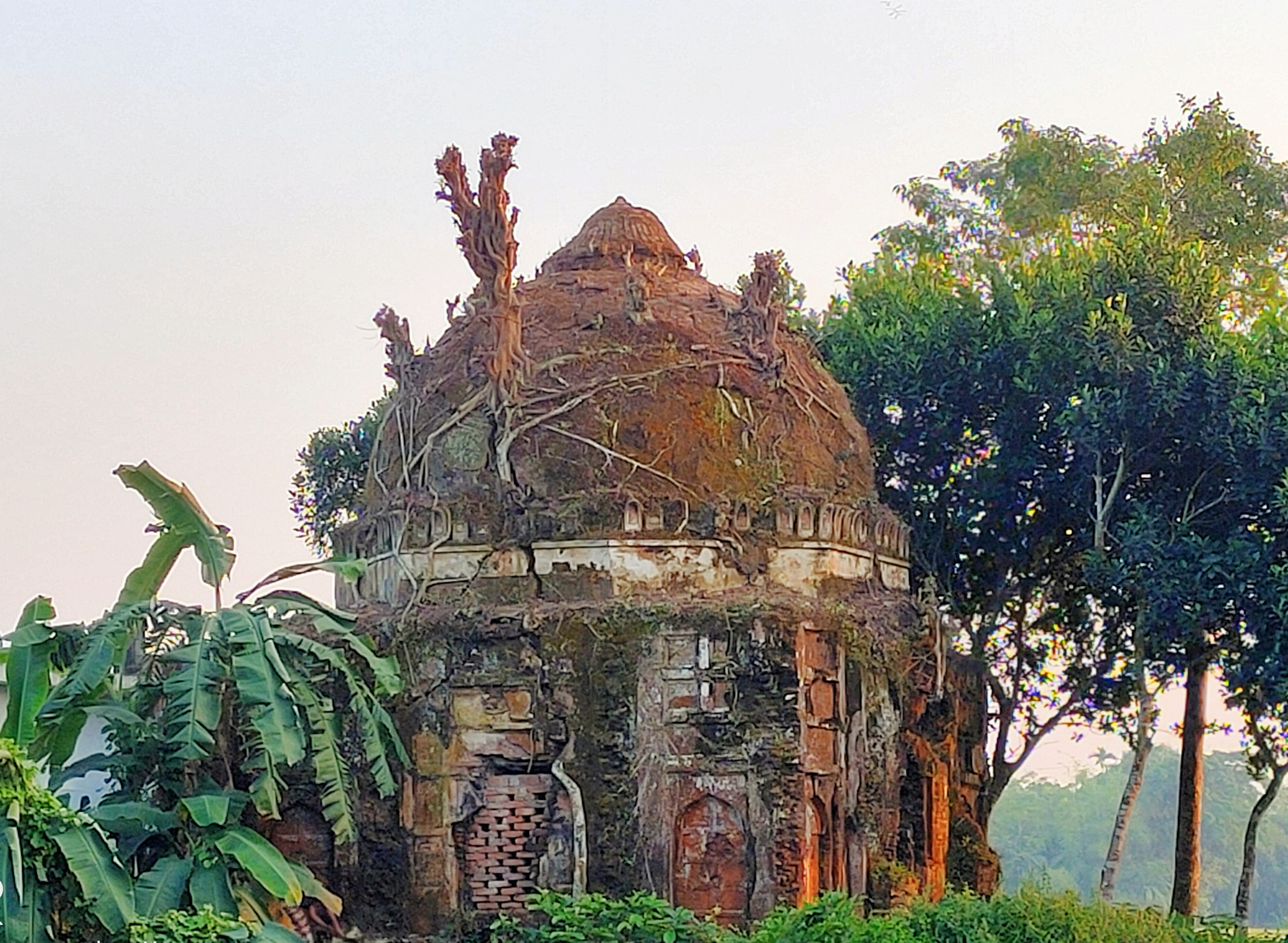
The Aurangzeb Mosque was founded by Shaykh Muhammad Hanif in 1669.

Pakundia is home to the ancient town of Egarosindur, dating back to 1000 BC. Xuanzang mentions that the land as having been newly raised, and surrounded by dense forest. By the 8th century, the people of this area began trading with Ancient Rome and Persia. As the forest-dwelling hill people settled here in the 9th to 10th century, tribes such as the Koch, Garo, Hajong, Ahom and Mech emerged as small groups under the feudal kingdoms. Due to various reasons, there was internal conflict between these feudal kings. After coming into the hands of Sultan Fakhruddin Mubarak Shah in the 1330s, the fort-town became incorporated within the Sultanate of Bengal. In the medieval period, a Sufi wali known as Malang Shah arrived with the intention of propagating Islam to the masses. Some sources state that he was among eleven preachers, after whom Egarosindur is named after. Described as a pure soul (pakwan deha), Malang Shah was buried in his khanqah during his death and the area came to be known as Pakundia (a corruption of pakwandeha). Sukumar Sen theorises that the name actually comes from the Pakur tree, which is found abundantly in the area, and the term diya (a highland surrounded by water on both sides).

During the reign of the Mughal emperor Shah Jahan, Shaykh Sadi bin Shiru established the Sadi Mosque in 1651. Emperor Aurangzeb granted a jagir of 62 mouzas to Shaykh Muhammad Hanif al-Muhaddith, instructing him to migrate from Delhi to eastern Bengal. Hanif established the Mian Bari zamindari in present-day Pakundia.

In 1802, the Mangalbaria Madrasa was founded. In 1919, the Tarakandi Madrasa was established. Three years later, the British colonial authorities founded a police headquarters (thana) in Pakundia. During the Bangladesh Liberation War of 1971, the Bengali freedom fighters battled the Pakistan Army in areas such as Kaliachapra, Kodalia and Tarakandi. 200 residents of Pakundia were killed by the army, and buried in a mass grave next to the BADC headquarters. Among the leading freedom fighters of Pakundia is Badiul Alam who was subsequently awarded with Bir Bikrom. The status of Pakundia Thana was upgraded to upazila (sub-district) on 14 September 1983 as part of the President of Bangladesh Hussain Muhammad Ershad's decentralisation programme.

== Demographics ==
Religions in Pakundia upazila (2022)
Religion	Percent
Islam	98.14%
Hinduism	1.85%
Other or not stated	0.01%

According to the 2022 Bangladeshi census, Pakundia Upazila had 70,616 households and a population of 282,981. 10.21% of the population were under 5 years of age. Pakundia had a literacy rate (age 7 and over) of 74.21%: 73.76% for males and 74.59% for females, and a sex ratio of 87.37 males for every 100 females. 49,580 (17.52%) lived in urban areas.

According to the 2011 Bangladesh census, Pakundia Upazila had 57,399 households and a population of 250,060. 63,020 (25.20%) were under 10 years of age. Pakundia had a literacy rate (age 7 and over) of 51.79%, compared to the national average of 51.8%, and a sex ratio of 1074 females per 1000 males. 28,606 (11.44%) lived in urban areas.

As of the 1991 Bangladesh census, Pakundia has a population of 210,355. Males are 51.26% of the population, and females 48.74%. This Upazila's eighteen up population is 103,661. Pakundia has an average literacy rate of 40.8% (7+ years), and the national average of 32.4% literate.

== Administration ==
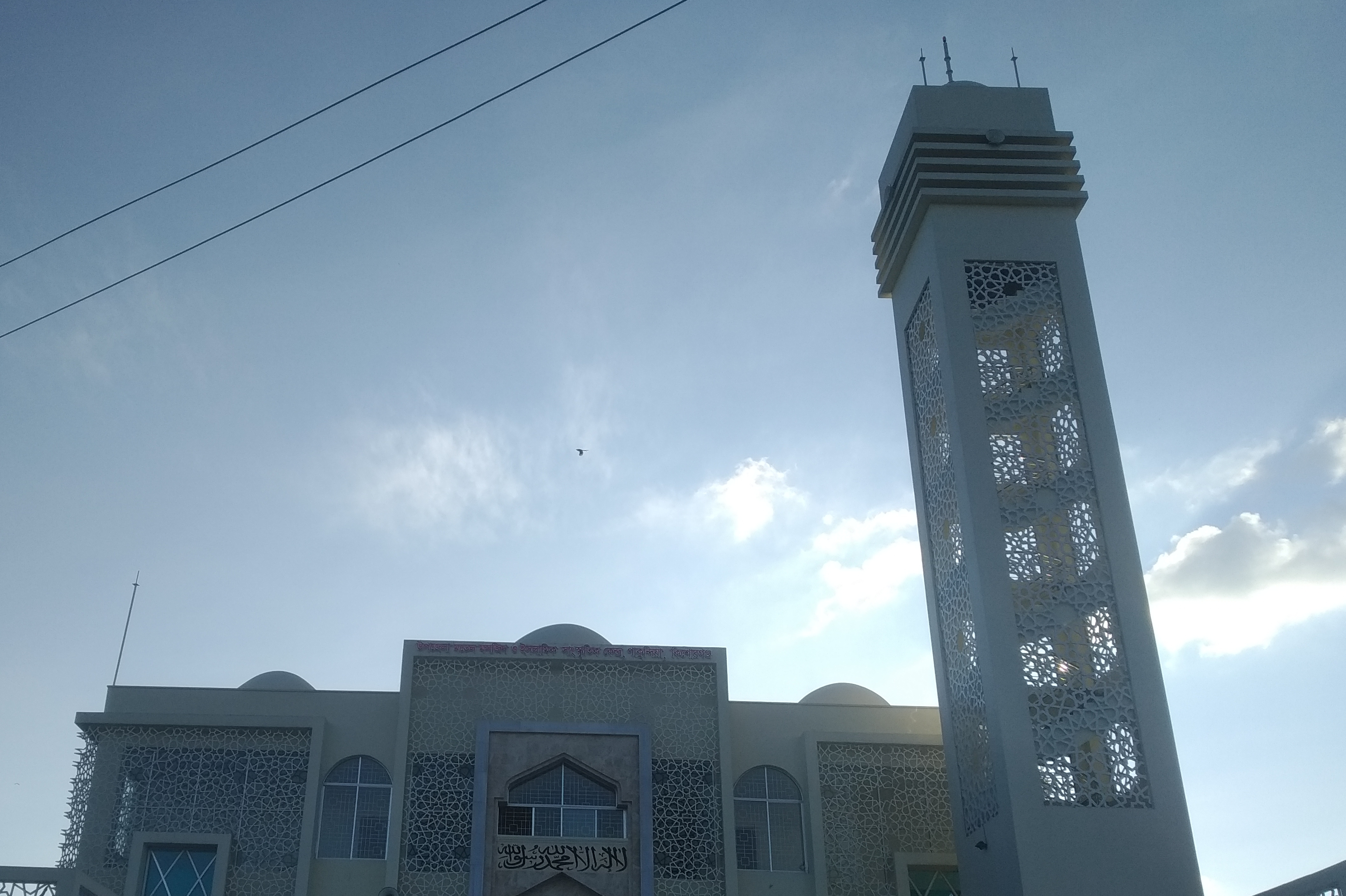
Pakundia Model Mosque and Islamic Cultural Center, located in Pakundia Upazila

Pakundia Upazila is divided into Pakundia Municipality, and nine union parishads: Barudia, Chandipasha, Char Faradi, Egarasindur, Hosendi, Jangalia, Narandi, Patuabhanga, and Sukhia. The union parishads are subdivided into 97 mauzas and 150 villages.

Pakundia Municipality is subdivided into 9 wards and 25 mahallas.

List of chairmen
Name	Term
Maulawi Muhammad Khurshiduddin	1985-07-05-1990-02-04
Muhammad Akhtaruzzaman Khokan	1990-02-04-1991-07-04
Advocate Muhammad Sohrabuddin	2009-06-14-2013-11-30
Muhammad AKM Fazlul Haq Bacchu	2013-12-04-2014-04-23
Muhammad Rafiqul Islam Renu	2014-04-24–2024-04-23

|Emdadul Haque Juton |2044-04-25–present |}

== Education ==
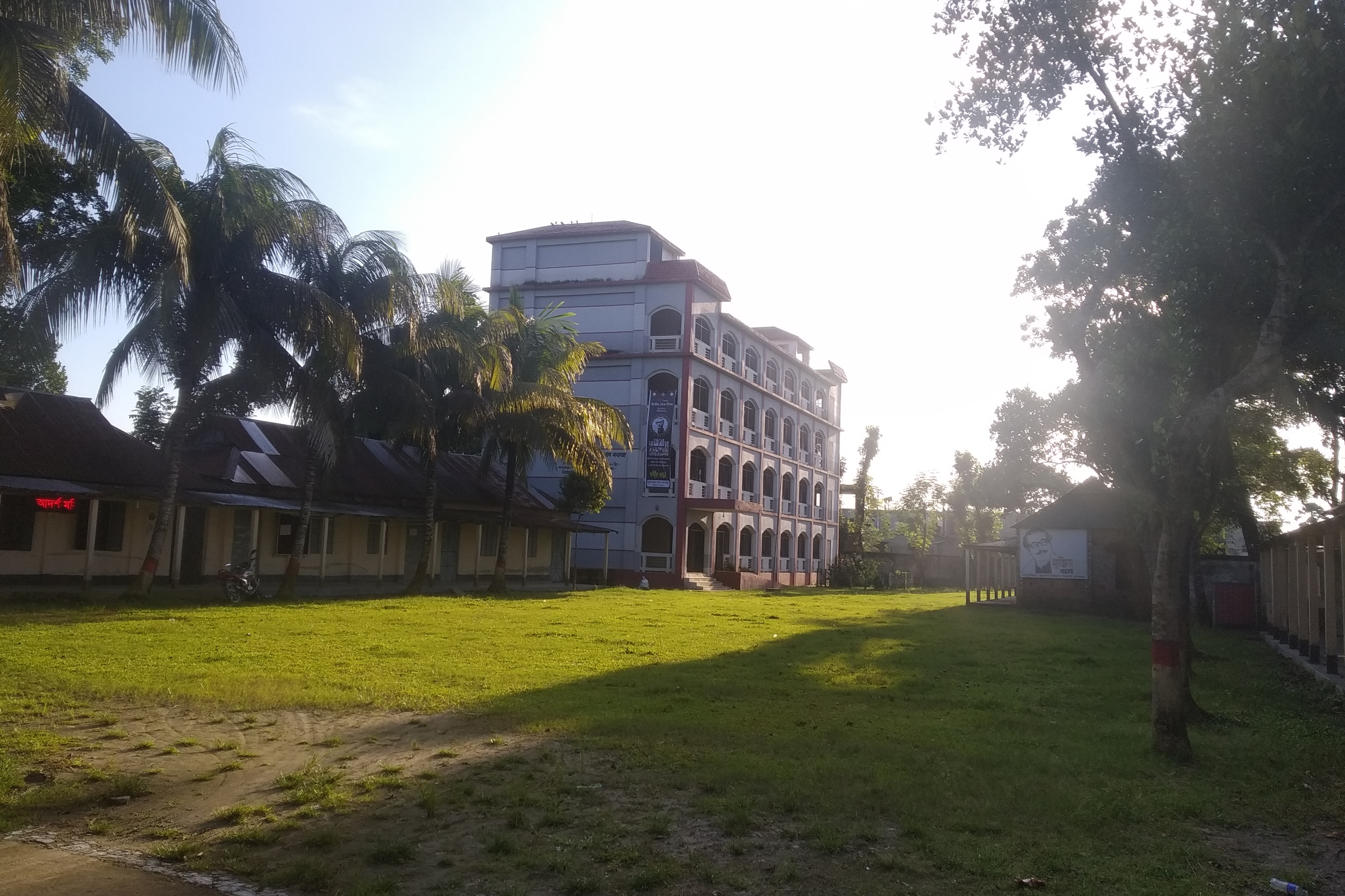
Pakundia Adarsha Mohila College

There are many educational facilities in Pakundia including:

- Mangalbaria Kamil Madrasa
- Mirdi Fazil Madrasa
- Tarakandi Fazil Madrasa
- Kaghachar Women's Madrasa
- Motkhola High School
- Asia Bari Adarsa School
- Hazi Zafor Ali College
- Pakundia Adarsha Mohila College
- Pakundia Government College

== Notable people ==
- ABM Zahidul Haq, politician, former Deputy Minister of Shipping and founder of Pakundia Adarsha Mohila College
- Abul Kashem Fazlul Haq, columnist and activist
- Farid Uddin Masood, Islamic scholar
- Jibon Rahman, film director
- Gias Uddin Ahmed, was a public servant from Narandi Pakundia Kishoreganj District

== See also ==
- List of upazilas in Bangladesh
