= Electoral history of Mohammad Abdul Hamid =

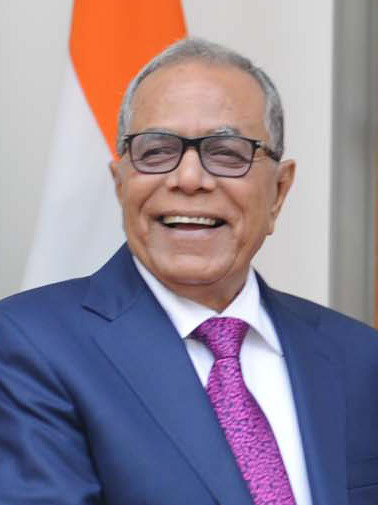
Mohammad Abdul Hamid

This is a summary of the electoral history of Mohammad Abdul Hamid, a Bangladeshi politician who served as the president of Bangladesh from 2013 to 2023.

== Summery ==
=== Presidential elections ===
Year	Party	Votes	%	Result
2013	Awami League	Unopposed		Won
2018	Awami League	Unopposed		Won

=== Jatiya Sangsad elections ===
Year	Constituency	Party	Votes	%	Result
1973	Mymensingh-30	Awami League			Won
1986	Kishoreganj-5	Awami League	59,061		Won
1991	Kishoreganj-5	Awami League	62,792	54.9	Won
June 1996	Kishoreganj-5	Awami League	54,073	37.0	Won
2001	Kishoreganj-5	Awami League	93,915	51.4	Won
2008	Kishoreganj-4	Awami League	1,15,093	55.2	Won

== Detailed results ==
=== Parliamentary elections ===
==== Kishoreganj-5 ====
General Election 1991: Kishoreganj-5
Party	Candidate	Votes	%	±%
AL	Mohammad Abdul Hamid	62,792	54.9	
BNP	Habibur Rahman Bhuiyan	26,540	23.2	
Bangladesh Muslim League (Aian Uddin)	A. H. M. Kamruzzaman Khan	16,205	14.2	
Jamaat	Abdus Salam Khan Pathan	4,058	3.5	
JP(E)	Md. Shafiqul Islam	2,301	2.0	
Zaker Party	Md. Ahmed Karim Mollah	887	0.8	
WPB	Kazi Salah Uddin	520	0.5	
Jatiya Samajtantrik Dal-JSD	Ali Ahmed Milki	451	0.4	
Ganatantri Party	Md. Hasmat Uddin Thakur	338	0.3	
Independent	Golam Rabbani	294	0.3	
Majority		36,252	31.7	
Turnout		114,386	51.3	
AL gain from				

==== Kishoreganj-5 ====
General Election June 1996: Kishoreganj-5
Party	Candidate	Votes	%	±%
AL	Mohammad Abdul Hamid	54,073	37.0	−17.9
Independent	Md. Fazlur Rahman	52,024	35.6	N/A
BNP	Emdadul Haque	27,251	18.6	−4.6
JP(E)	Ershad Uddin Ahmed Khan Milki	8,045	5.5	+3.5
Jamaat	Abdus Salam Khan Pathan	2,211	1.5	−2.0
Gano Forum	Borhanuddin Chowdhury	2,100	1.4	N/A
Islamic Sashantantrik Andolan	K. M. Aminul Haque	568	0.4	N/A
Majority		2,049	1.4	−30.3
Turnout		146,272	75.3	+24.0
AL hold				

==== Kishoreganj-5 ====
General Election 2001: Kishoreganj-5
Party	Candidate	Votes	%	±%
AL	Mohammad Abdul Hamid	93,915	51.4	+14.4
KSJL	Md. Fazlur Rahman	63,656	34.9	N/A
BNP	Jahir Uddin Bhuiyan	25,064	13.7	−4.9
Majority		30,259	16.6	+15.2
Turnout		182,635	72.3	−3.0
AL hold				

==== Kishoreganj-4 ====
General Election 2008: Kishoreganj-4
Party	Candidate	Votes	%	±%
AL	Mohammad Abdul Hamid	115,093	55.2	+22.0
BNP	Fazlur Rahman	92,440	44.3	+10.5
Bangladesh Khelafat Majlish	Hedayetulla Hadi	1,025	0.5	N/A
Majority		22,653	10.9	+10.3
Turnout		208,558	86.6	+12.0
AL gain from BNP				
