= 2018 Bangladeshi presidential election =

- 18 February 2018
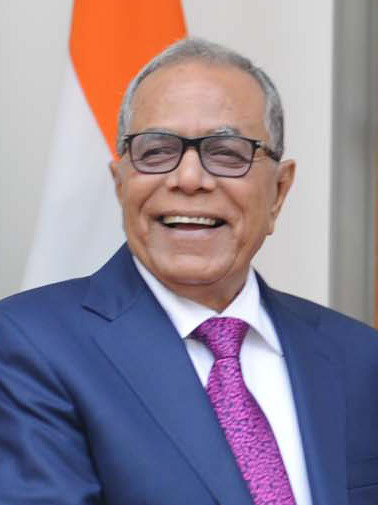
Nominee	Mohammad Abdul Hamid
Party	AL
Electoral vote	306
President before election
Mohammad Abdul Hamid
AL
Elected President
Mohammad Abdul Hamid
AL

The 2018 Bangladeshi presidential election was held on 18 February 2018. It was the seventh presidential election held since the Twelfth Amendment changed how the president gets elected. The tenure of the incumbent president was set to end on April 23, 2018. Earlier, on January 25, 2018, the Election Commission announced the election schedule. Incumbent president Mohammad Abdul Hamid was nominated for the second time as the candidate to run for election by the ruling party. Hamid was declared president by the Election Commission as no other candidate submitted nomination papers to the commission. He was sworn in by the Speaker of the Jatiya Sangsad Shirin Chaudhury on April 24, 2018. With the result of the election, Hamid became the first incumbent president to win re-election.

== Candidates ==
Candidate	Born	Nominator party	Positions held	Home district	Date announced	Ref.
Mohammad Abdul Hamid	1 January 1944 (aged 74); Kamalpur, Mithamain, Greater Mymensingh	Bangladesh Awami League	President of Bangladesh (2013–2018); Speaker of the Jatiya Sangsad (2001, 2009–2013); Deputy Speaker of the Jatiya Sangsad (1996–2001); Deputy Leader of the Opposition (Jatiya Sangsad) (2001–2006); Member of Parliament representing Kishoreganj-4 (2009–2013), Kishoreganj-5 (1986–1987, 1991–1996, 1996–2006), and Mymensingh-30 (1973–1975); Member of the Constituent Assembly representing Mymensingh-18 in the Pakistan National Assembly (1972)	Kishoreganj	31 January 2018	

== See also ==
- 2018 elections in Bangladesh
