= 2013 Bangladeshi presidential election =

- 22 April 2013
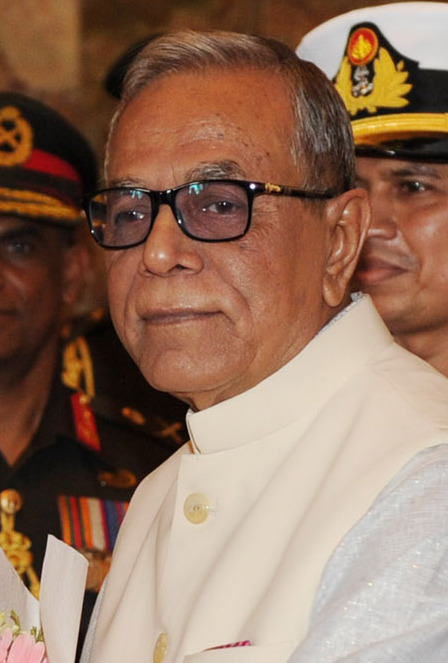
Nominee	Abdul Hamid
Party	AL
Electoral vote	Unopposed
President before election
Abdul Hamid (acting)
AL
Elected President
Abdul Hamid
AL

The 2013 Bangladeshi presidential election were held in Bangladesh on 22 April 2013 following the death of Zillur Rahman on 20 March 2013.

== Background ==
President Zillur Rahman died on 20 March in Singapore after being flown there with an illness. Parliamentary speaker Abdul Hamid took over in an interim capacity.

At that time, Social protests had turned deadly in Bangladesh as a result of delayed prosecutions and convictions for war crimes committed during the Bangladesh War of Independence. The 2014 general election was also going to be on the new president's agenda. The opposition Bangladesh Nationalist Party and its allies said they would boycott the election if it was not held under a neutral interim government. However, the ruling Awami League's leader Sheikh Hasina said her government would preside over the electoral process.

== Candidates ==
Candidate	Born	Nominator party	Positions held	Home district	Date announced	Ref.
Mohammad Abdul Hamid	1 January 1944 (aged 69); Kamalpur, Mithamain, Greater Mymensingh	Bangladesh Awami League	Acting President of Bangladesh (2013); Speaker of the Jatiya Sangsad (2001, 2009–2013); Deputy Speaker of the Jatiya Sangsad (1996–2000); Deputy Leader of the Opposition (Jatiya Sangsad) (2001–2006); Member of Parliament representing Kishoreganj-4 (2009–2013), Kishoreganj-5 (1986–1987, 1991–1996, 1996–2006), and Mymensingh-30 (1973–1975); Member of the Constituent Assembly representing Mymensingh-18 in the Pakistan National Assembly (1972)	Kishoreganj	21 April 2013	

== Election ==
Hamid won the election unopposed through a parliamentary vote. S.M. Asaduzzman, a director of the election commission, said: "Abdul Hamid has won the election uncontested. The chief election commissioner declared him as the winner today."
