= List of international presidential trips made by Mohammed Shahabuddin =

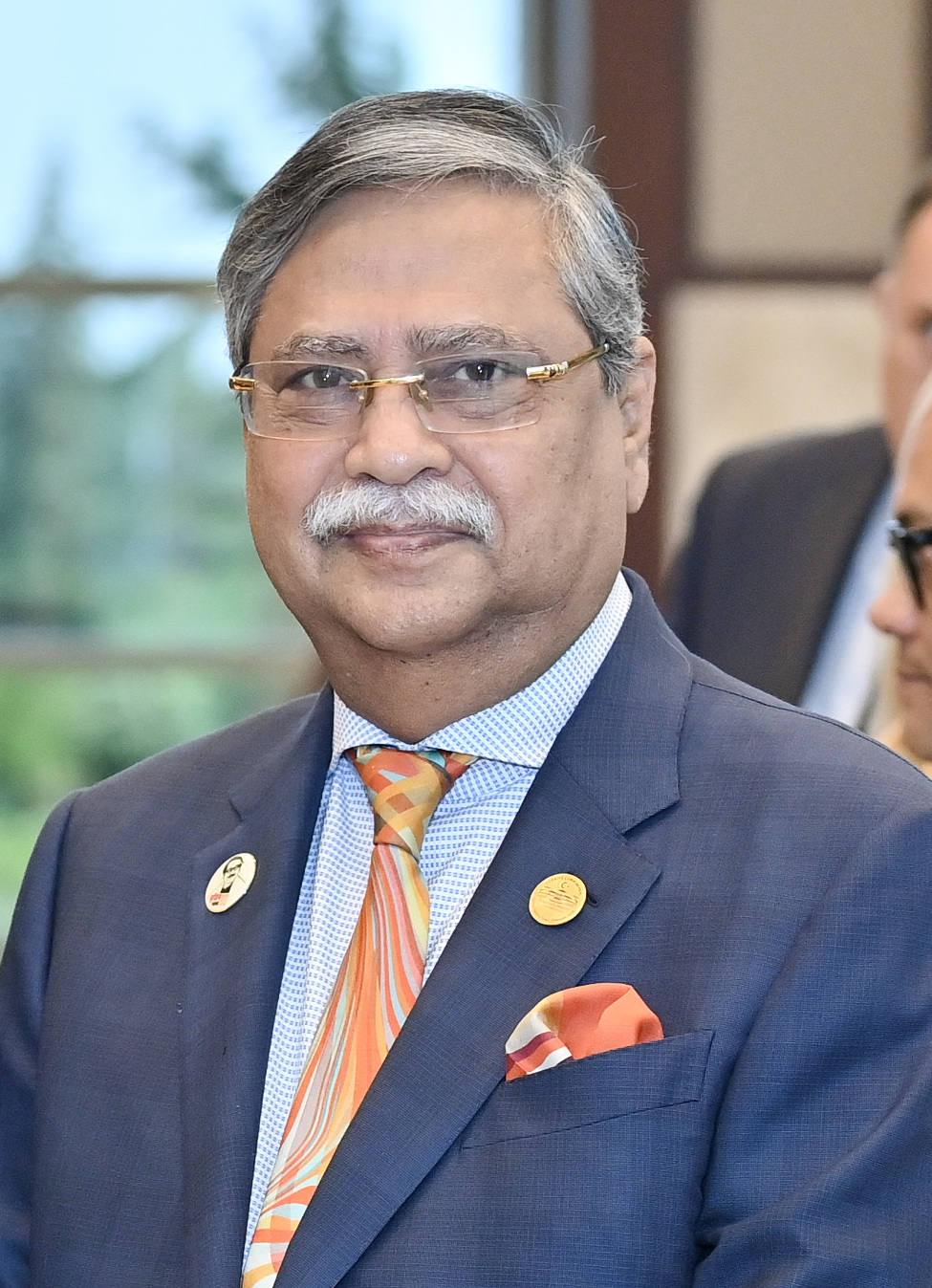
Mohammed Shahabuddin Chuppu in Ankara, 2023

This is a list of international presidential trips made by Mohammed Shahabuddin Chuppu, the 16th and current president of Bangladesh. Mohammed Shahabuddin has made 5 international trips to 6 different countries, 2 of them solely for medical checkups, since his inauguration as president on 24 April 2023 following his election in February of the same year.

== Summary ==
President Mohammed Shahabuddin's visits by country
Number of visits	Country
1 (5)	Turkey, Saudi Arabia, Indonesia, United Arab Emirates, United Kingdom
2 (1)	Singapore

== 2023 ==
#	Country	Areas visited	Date(s)	Purpose(s)	Notes	Image(s)
1	Turkey	Ankara	1–6 June	Inauguration of the 3rd term of Recep Tayyip Erdoğan as president	See also: Bangladesh–Turkey relations Details	
2	Saudi Arabia	Jeddah, Mecca, Medina	23 June–2 July	Hajj (Islamic Pilgrimage)	See also: Bangladesh–Saudi Arabia relations Details	
3	Indonesia					
3	Singapore					
4	Singapore					

== 2024 ==
#	Country	Areas visited	Date(s)	Purpose(s)	Notes	Image(s)
5	United Arab Emirates	Dubai	3–5 March		See also: Bangladesh–United Arab Emirates relations Details	
5	United Kingdom	London, Cambridge	5–13 March		See also: Bangladesh–United Kingdom relations Details	

== See also ==
- Mohammad Abdul Hamid
- List of international prime ministerial trips made by Sheikh Hasina
