= Mizanul Haque =

Bangladesh politician (died 2021)

- ড. মিজানুল হক

Member of Bangladesh Parliament
- In office 1991 – February 1996
- Preceded by: Mujibul Haque
- Succeeded by: Kabira Uuddina Ahmed
- In office June 1996 – October 2001
- Preceded by: Kabira Uuddina Ahmed
- Succeeded by: Osman Faruk

Personal details
- Born: British Raj
- Died: 27 August 2021
- Party: Bangladesh Awami League

Mizanul Haque (died 27 August 2021) was a Bangladesh Awami League politician who served as member of parliament for Kishoreganj-4.

== Career ==
Mizanul Haque was elected to parliament from Kishoreganj-4 as a Bangladesh Awami League candidate in 1991 and June 1996. In 2005, he appeared in court wearing a funeral shroud.

== Death ==
Mizanul Haque died on 27 August 2021 at Shahid Syed Nazrul Islam Medical College in Kishoreganj, Bangladesh.
