= Mithamain Cantonment =

Bangladesh military cantonment

Mithamain Cantonment is a Bangladeshi military cantonment in Mithamain, Kishoreganj.

== History ==
This cantonment was initially named after the former President of Bangladesh Mohammad Abdul Hamid. On 28 February 2023, Prime Minister Sheikh Hasina inaugurated the newly built cantonment. The Cantonment is built on 275 acres of land beside the Ghorauta River.

After the fall of Sheikh Hasina's regime following the a mass uprising in July-August 2024, the cantonment was renamed to "Mithamain Cantonment".

== See also ==
- List of formations of the Bangladesh Army
