= 2018 elections in Bangladesh. =

Overview of the 2018 elections in Bangladesh

Elections in Bangladesh
← 2017	2018	2019 →

Elections in Bangladesh in 2018 include election to the office of the President of Bangladesh, 11th Jatiya Sangsad election, by-elections to the 10th Jatiya Sangsad, elections to several city corporations, municipalities and local bodies.

== Presidential election ==
Presidential election was held on 7 February 2018. Incumbent President Mohammad Abdul Hamid was nominated for the second time as the candidate to run for election by the ruling party. Hamid was declared president by the Election Commission as no other candidate submitted nomination papers to the commission.

Date	President before election	Party before election	Elected President	Party after election	Ref.
7 February 2018 (Note: It was scheduled for 18 February, but Hamid was declared to be elected unopposed on 13 February 2023)	Mohammad Abdul Hamid	Bangladesh Awami League	Mohammad Abdul Hamid	Bangladesh Awami League	

== General election ==

General elections were held in Bangladesh on 30 December 2018 to elect 300 directly elected members of the Jatiya Sangsad. The result was another landslide victory for the Awami League-led Grand Alliance led by Sheikh Hasina.

=== Results ===
Party	Votes	%	Seats	+/–
Awami League (Note: The voting figures of the Awami League does not include the votes for 14 candidates of allied parties who contested on the Awami League 'boat' symbol)	63,523,066	74.63	302	+29
Jatiya Party	4,443,351	5.22	26	–8
Bangladesh Nationalist Party (Note: The voting figures of BNP includes all votes cast for candidates on the BNP 'sheaf of paddy' election symbol, including candidates belonging to allied parties)	11,113,253	13.06	7	+7
Islami Andolan Bangladesh	1,255,373	1.47	0	–
Workers Party of Bangladesh (Note: WPB fielded three candidates on its 'hammer' election symbol, who received 1,729 votes, and five candidates on the Awami League 'boat' symbol, who received 644,335 votes.)	646,064	0.76	4	–2
Jatiya Samajtantrik Dal (Note: JASAD fielded nine candidates on its 'torch' election symbol, who received39,104 votes, and three candidates on the Awami League 'boat' symbol, who received 570940 votes.)	610,044	0.72	2	–3
Bikalpa Dhara Bangladesh (Note: Bikalpdhara Bangladesh fielded 23 candidates on its 'winnowing fan' election symbol, who received 18,183 votes, and three candidates on the Awami League 'boat' symbol, who received 547,757 votes.)	565,940	0.66	2	+2
Nationalist Democratic Movement	496,427	0.58	0	–
Bangladesh Tarikat Federation (Note: Bangladesh Tarikat Federation fielded 16 candidates on its 'winnowing fan' election symbol, who received 6,087 votes, and two candidates on the Awami League 'boat' symbol, who received 423,868 votes.)	429,955	0.51	1	–1
Bangladesh Jatiya Samajtantrik Dal (Note: One Bangladesh JASAD candidate ran on the Awami League 'boat' symbol.)	282,313	0.33	1	+1
Bangladesh Congress	184,823	0.22	0	–
Jatiya Party (Manju)	182,611	0.21	1	–1
Zaker Party	109,440	0.13	0	–
Gano Forum	103,535	0.12	2	+2
Bangladesh Islami Front	60,372	0.07	0	–
Communist Party of Bangladesh	55,421	0.07	0	–
National People's Party	36,611	0.04	0	–
Islamic Front Bangladesh	31,468	0.04	0	–
Liberal Democratic Party	25,152	0.03	0	–
Revolutionary Workers Party of Bangladesh	18,043	0.02	0	–
Socialist Party of Bangladesh	17,591	0.02	0	–
Bangladesh Muslim League	15,116	0.02	0	–
Bangladesh Nationalist Front	13,289	0.02	0	–1
Islami Oikya Jote	11,328	0.01	0	–
Khelafat Majlish	11,203	0.01	0	–
Bangladesh Khilafat Andolan	9,796	0.01	0	–
Bangladesh National Awami Party	8,367	0.01	0	–
Progressive Democratic Party	6,113	0.01	0	–
Gano Front	5,277	0.01	0	–
Bangladesh National Awami Party-Bangladesh NAP	5,176	0.01	0	–
Bangladesh Jatiya Party	4,606	0.01	0	–
Jatiya Ganotantrik Party	3,798	0.00	0	–
Jatiya Samajtantrik Dal (Rab)	3,119	0.00	0	–
Bangladesh Khelafat Majlish	2,899	0.00	0	–
Jamiat Ulema-e-Islam Bangladesh	2,351	0.00	0	–
Ganatantri Party	1,641	0.00	0	–
Bangladesh Cultural Liberation Front (Muktijote)	1,219	0.00	0	–
Krishak Sramik Janata League	597	0.00	0	–
Communist Party of Bangladesh (M-L)	387	0.00	0	–
Bangladesh Muslim League-BML	228	0.00	0	–
Bangladesh Jatiya Party	111	0.00	0	–
Bangladesh Kalyan Party	55	0.00	0	–
Independents	816,902	0.96	2	–12
Total	85,114,431	100.00	350	+50
Registered voters/turnout	104,142,381	80.20		
Source: ECS, ECS, ECS, Daily Star, Financial Express, Dhaka Tribune, Daily Star, Daily Star, parliament.gov.bd, IFES

== See also ==
- 2023 elections in Bangladesh
