= First Lady of Bangladesh =

Title of the spouse of the president of Bangladesh

- Incumbent; Rahat Ara Begum since 21 August 2026
- Style: Begum; Madam First Lady
- Residence: Bangabhaban
- Appointer: President of Bangladesh
- Term length: Five years, renewable once
- Inaugural holder: Sheikh Fazilatunnesa Mujib
- Formation: 26 March 1971; 55 years ago

First Lady of Bangladesh (Bengali: বাংলাদেশের ফার্স্ট লেডি, romanized: Bānlādēśēra phārsṭa lēḍi) is the unofficial title attributed to the spouse of the president of Bangladesh. Prominent former first ladies include Bangamata Sheikh Fazilatunnesa Mujib, former prime minister Khaleda Zia and former opposition leader Rowshan Ershad.

The title should not be confused with the husband or wife of the prime minister of Bangladesh. Rashida Hamid was the longest serving first lady of Bangladesh.

== Duties ==
Duties of the first lady are receiving foreign leaders along with the president, conversing with the spouse of the foreign leader, being a role model for the people of the nation, promoting of policies by the government urging public support of policies, and advocating for socio-economic change. An example of this is Rowshan Ershad who called for improvements in women's rights.

=== Appointment ===
The first lady takes up her role and office after the inauguration of the president of Bangladesh who is appointed by the Jatiya Sangsad. After the inauguration she resides with her husband at Bangabhaban.

== List of officeholders ==
Political parties

Awami League
Bangladesh Krishak Sramik Awami League (BaKSAL)
Bangladesh Nationalist Party (BNP)
Jatiya Party

Other affiliations

Independent

Status

Acting

No.	Portrait	Name	President	Term as First Lady			Political party
No.	Portrait	Name	President	Start of term	End of term	Tenure	Political party
1		Sheikh Fazilatunnesa Mujib	Sheikh Mujibur Rahman	17 April 1971	12 January 1972	270 days	Awami League
—		Syeda Nafisa Islam	Syed Nazrul Islam	17 April 1971	12 January 1972	270 days	Awami League
2		Begum Khurshid Chowdhury	Abu Sayeed Chowdhury	12 January 1972	24 December 1973	1 year, 346 days	Awami League
3		Name Unavailable	Mohammad Mohammadullah	24 December 1973	25 January 1975	1 year, 32 days	Awami League
(1)		Sheikh Fazilatunnesa Mujib	Sheikh Mujibur Rahman	25 January 1975	15 August 1975	202 days	BaKSAL
4		Name Unavailable	Khondaker Mostaq Ahmad	15 August 1975	6 November 1975	83 days	Awami League
5		Khodeza Begum	Abu Sadat Mohammad Sayem	6 November 1975	21 April 1977	1 year, 166 days	Awami League
6		Khaleda Zia	Ziaur Rahman	21 April 1977	30 May 1981	4 years, 39 days	BNP
7		Name Unavailable	Abdus Sattar	30 May 1981	24 March 1982	298 days	BNP
—		Vacant	N/A	24 March 1982	27 March 1982	1 year, 3 days	N/A
8		Name Unavailable	A. F. M. Ahsanuddin Chowdhury	27 March 1982	10 December 1983	1 year, 258 days	Independent
9		Rowshan Ershad	Hussain Muhammad Ershad	11 December 1983	6 December 1990	6 years, 360 days	Jatiya Party
—		Anowara Begum	Shahabuddin Ahmed	6 December 1990	10 October 1991	308 days	Independent
10		Hosne Ara Rahman	Abdur Rahman Biswas	10 October 1991	9 October 1996	4 years, 365 days	BNP
11		Anowara Begum	Shahabuddin Ahmed	9 October 1996	14 November 2001	5 years, 36 days	Independent
12		Hasina Warda Chowdhury	A. Q. M. Badruddoza Chowdhury	14 November 2001	21 June 2002	219 days	BNP
—		Nur Akhtar	Muhammad Jamiruddin Sircar	21 June 2002	6 September 2002	77 days	BNP
13		Anwara Begum	Iajuddin Ahmed	6 September 2002	12 February 2009	6 years, 159 days	Independent
—		Vacant	Zillur Rahman (Widower)	12 February 2009	20 March 2013	4 years, 36 days	Awami League
14		Rashida Hamid	Mohammad Abdul Hamid	14 March 2013	24 April 2023	10 years, 41 days	Awami League
15		Rebecca Sultana	Mohammed Shahabuddin	24 April 2023	24 July 2026	3 years, 91 days	Awami League
—		Vacant	Hafizuddin Ahmed (Widower)	24 July 2026	21 August 2026	28 days	BNP
16		Rahat Ara Begum	Mirza Fakhrul Islam Alamgir	21 August 2026		17 days	BNP
