= Gurudayal Government College =

College in Kishoreganj, Bangladesh

- গুরুদয়াল সরকারি কলেজ
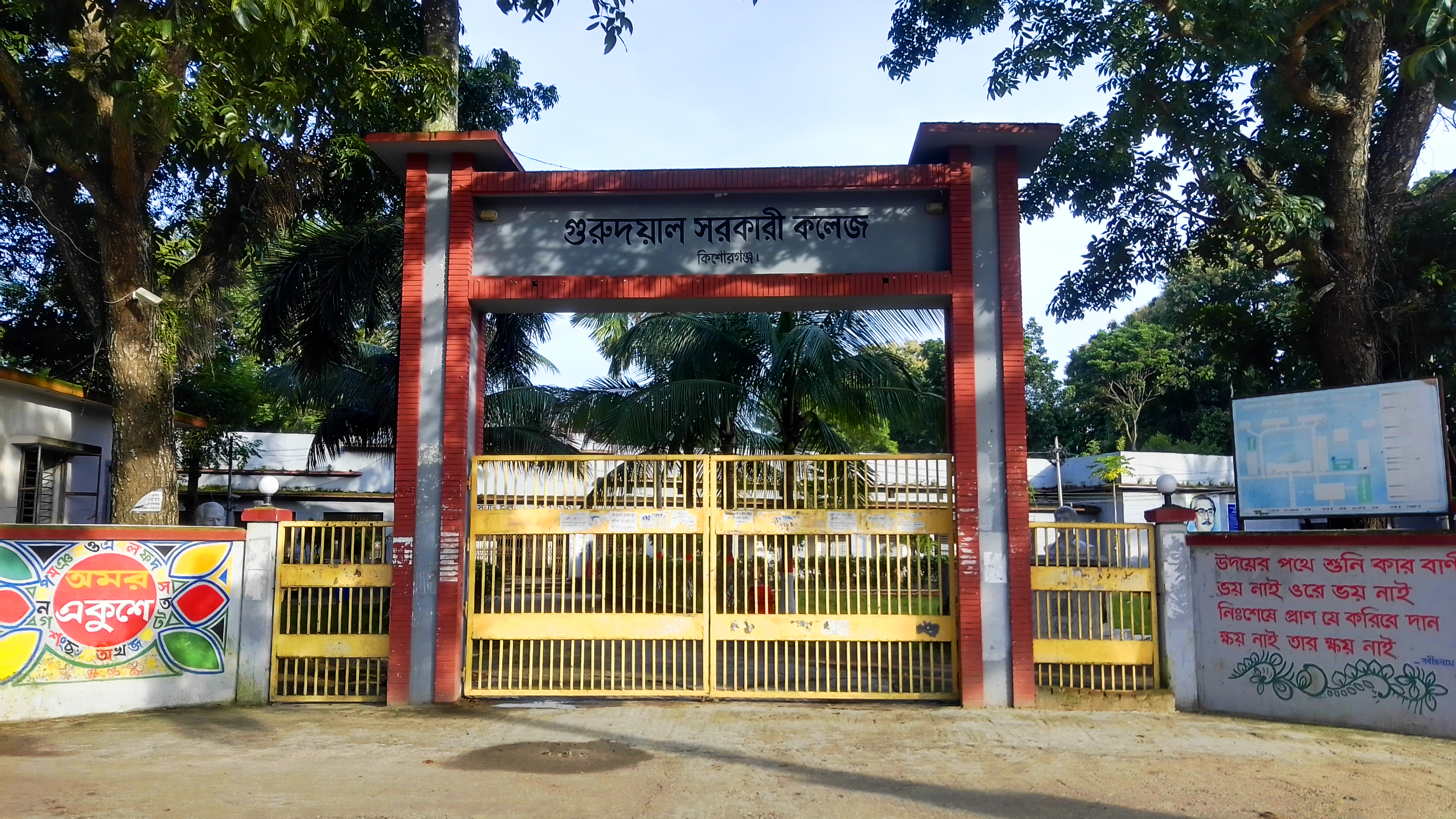
- Established: 1943; 83 years ago
- Affiliations: National University, Bangladesh
- Principal: Jamalur Rahman
- Location: Kishoreganj, Bangladesh; 24.4409°N 90.7744°E
- Campus: Urban
- Website: gdc.gov.bd

Gurudayal Government College (Bengali: গুরুদয়াল সরকারি কলেজ) is a public tertiary higher education institution in Kishoreganj, Bangladesh. It is affiliated with the National University in Bangladesh. The college is located in Kishoreganj, Bangladesh. The college was founded in 1943.

The college has its campus on 22.72 acres of land. As of 2021, it had 22,000 students. The college offers higher secondary education, undergraduate (three-year bachelor pass and four-year bachelor's honours), and graduate (master's) level education to students. Undergraduate and graduate level education is imparted in four key areas: arts, commerce, science, and social science. Undergraduate honour's level education is offered in sixteen disciplines: Bangla; English; history; Islamic history and culture; philosophy; political science; economics; accounting; management; physics; chemistry; botany; zoology; geography and environment; and mathematics.

== Academics ==
As of June 2022, the college had a total of 163 academic positions: 16 professors, 32 associate professors, 47 assistant professors, and 66 lecturer positions. The academics are selected by the Bangladesh Public Service Commission and appointed by the government of Bangladesh (Ministry of Public Administration) as a member of Bangladesh Civil Service (General Education) Cadre Service. The conditions of the service and related other matters are managed by the Directorate of Secondary and Higher Education (DSHE), and the Secondary and Higher Education Division (SHED).

== Faculties & Departments ==
Faculty of Science

Department of Physics

Department of Chemistry

Department of Mathematics

Faculty of Life & Earth Science

Department of Botany

Department of Zoology

Department of Geography & Environmental Science

Faculty of Arts

Department of Bengali language & Literature

Department of English Language & Literature

Department of Philosophy

Department of History

Department of Islamic History & Culture

Department of Islamic Studies

Faculty of Social Science

Department of Sociology

Department of Economics

Department of Social Work

Department of Political Science

Faculty of Business Administration

Department of Accounting

Department of Management

== Notable alumni ==
- Justice Shahabuddin Ahmed, Former President of Bangladesh, 1996-2001
- Abdul Hamid, 16th President of Bangladesh
- Amir Hossain, justice of the Supreme Court of Bangladesh
- Rashida Hamid, Bangladeshi teacher, former First Lady of Bangladesh
- Md. Muzammel Hossain, judge
- Alauddin Ahammad, academic

== See also ==
- Pakundia Adarsha Mohila College
- Shahid Syed Nazrul Islam Medical College
