= Faruk Quazi =

Canadian-Bangladeshi legal journalist (1949–2020)

- ফারুক কাজী
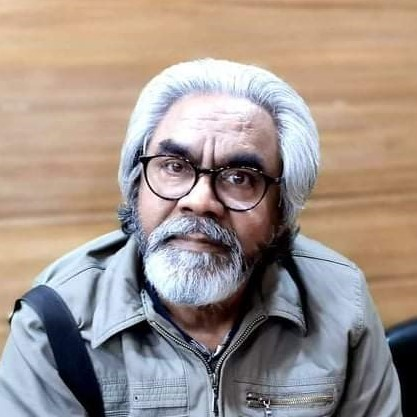
- Bangladeshi Legal Journalist Faruk Quazi on Feb 13, 2020 at Dhaka Reporters Unity (DRU)
- Born: January 17, 1949; Thanapara, Kushtia, Bangladesh
- Died: July 3, 2020 (aged 71); New Elephant Road, Dhaka, Bangladesh
- Education: University of Dhaka
- Occupations: Legal journalist, Law, Justice and Parliamentary Affairs as well as Politics
- Years active: 1972–2020
- Known for: Pioneer of Legal Journalism in Bangladesh and Founding President of Law Reporters' Forum The proceedings of the Bangabandhu Murder Case, Jail Killing Case and cases with the special trial courts at Parliament Building Complex filed against Honorable Prime Minister Sheikh Hasina by the past Caretaker Government; Also covered the cases pending with the higher courts filed against the Honorable Prime Minister Guest Lecturer of Legal Journalism of University of Dhaka
- Spouse: Rashida Quazi
- Children: Arshi Quazi
- Parents: Late Quazi Kafil Uddin Ahmed; Late Quazi Aklima Ahmed

Faruk Quazi (Bengali: ফারুক কাজী; January 17, 1949 - July 3, 2020) was a Bangladeshi journalist and law reporter. He served Bangladesh Prime Minister as Deputy Press Secretary and Bangladesh High Commission in New Delhi as Press Minister. He was also one of the founders and President of the Law Reporters' Forum of Bangladesh. He was a pioneer law reporter and introduced law reporting by journalists in Bangladesh. He covered the Supreme Court's proceedings since 1972. He covered parliament also.

After returning from Bangladesh Liberation War, 1971, Faruk Quazi joined now-defunct Daily Banglar Bani in 1972. In 1997 he joined Bangladesh Sangbad Songstha and then he was appointed as Deputy Press Secretary of Prime Minister and later on he joined Bangladesh High Commission in New Delhi as Press Minister. Returning from New Delhi he joined UNB as Chief Correspondents of News and he established with his fellow friends Law Reporters' Forum and became the first President of the forum.

== Early life and family ==
Born in a respected family of Kushtia on Jan 17, 1949. His father Late Quazi Kafil Uddin Ahmed was a prominent lawyer of that time and Founder President of the Kushtia District Awami League. His father was elected MLA in the 1954 election in East Bengal, the first election since Pakistan was created. His elder brother Quazi Rashidul Huq Pasha is a prominent journalist, writer, director, and actor of Bangladesh.

== Student politics ==
1968 movement in Pakistan took the form of a mass uprising of students and workers, attracting people from every profession. The uprising took place from early November 1968 to the end of March 1969, around 10 to 15 million people were involved. The movement resulted in the regime of Ayub Khan (President of Pakistan) being brought down. Faruk Quazi was a very active organizer of that student movement against Ayub Khan. His written posters were very popular at that time. He was arrested along with 10 more movement leaders and taken to jail. On the arrest of these 11 leaders, the protest became stronger in Kushtia.

== Career ==
Started career as a Reporter in now-defunct “Banglar Bani”, a national daily, 1972.

Joined as a Senior Reporter at BSS in 1997 and was terminated in 2002 by the BNP Alliance Government.

Deputy Press Secretary-1 to Honorable Prime Minister Sheikh Hasina, 1999.

Minister (Press), Bangladesh High Commission in New Delhi in 2000 and was terminated by the BNP Alliance Government in 2001

Served as a Chief of Correspondents at the UNB.

== Establishing Law Reporters' Forum, 2004 ==
When the BNP-led alliance government came to power in 2001, many journalists in Bangladesh reported facing increased challenges covering political developments and government actions. In response to these conditions, Faruk Quazi and a group of legal journalists established the Law Reporters’ Forum in 2004 to support balanced legal and judicial reporting. Quazi became the first president of the forum, serving from 2004 to 2009, and the organization has since become an active professional body for journalists covering law and the judiciary.

== Death ==
Senior journalist Faruk Quazi died in his sleep at his flat on New Elephant Road in Dhaka on Friday morning. He was 71. His daughter Arshi Quazi said that her father was diagnosed with kidney failure on Thursday and he was kept sedated for pain. She said that after 58-hours of a deep sleep, 'my dad died at about 8:00 am on Friday,’. He was buried at Rayerbazar Intellectual Graveyard in Mohammadpur at 2:30 pm. Earlier, journalists, family members, and well-wishers paid their last respects to Faruk Quazi at his namaz-e-janaza held at the Kataban mosque after Jumma prayer.

He left behind his wife and a daughter.
