= Rashida Hamid =

Bangladeshi politician

- রাশিদা হামিদ
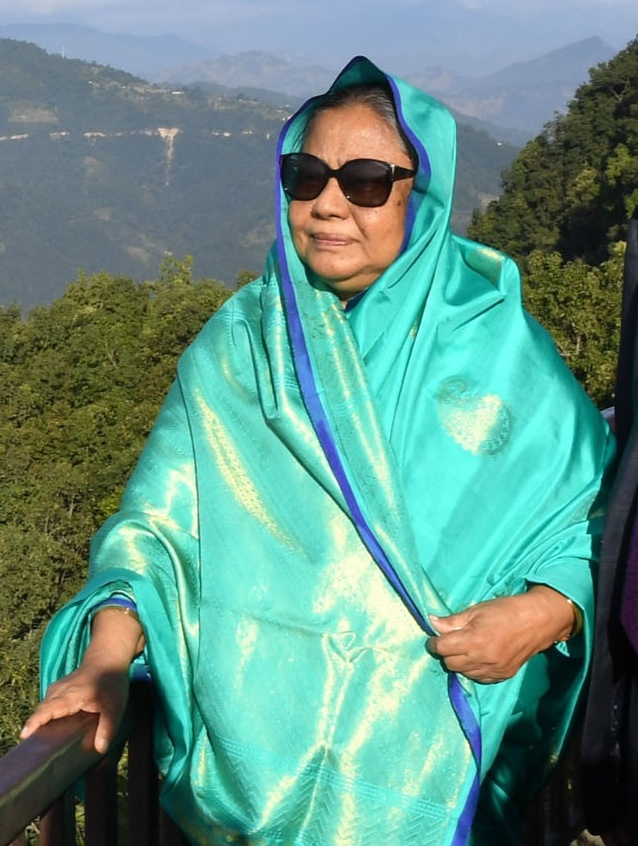
- Rashida in 2019

14th First Lady of Bangladesh
- In role 14 March 2013 – 24 April 2023
- President: Mohammad Abdul Hamid
- Preceded by: Anwara Begum
- Succeeded by: Rebecca Sultana

Personal details
- Born: Rashida Khanam Karimganj, Kishoreganj, Bangladesh
- Spouse: Mohammad Abdul Hamid (m. 1964)
- Children: 4, including Rejwan Ahammad Taufiq
- Education: Gurudayal Government College

Rashida Hamid (Bengali: রাশিদা হামিদ) is a Bangladeshi teacher, public figure and former First Lady of Bangladesh. She is the wife of the former President Mohammad Abdul Hamid, and served as the country's first lady from 2013 to 2023. She was the longest serving First Lady of Bangladesh.

== Early life ==
Rashida Hamid was born in Jaffarabad, Karimganj, Kishoreganj. She is the wife of former President Mohammad Abdul Hamid and mother of Rejwan Ahammad Taufiq, MP.

== Education ==
Hamid passed SSC from SV Government High School in 1963 and HSC from Gurudayal Government College. She graduated from Gurudayal Government College in 1972.

== Work ==
Rashida Hamid worked as headteacher in a kindergarten in Dhaka. She is the chairperson of President Abdul Hamid Medical College and Hospital's governing body.
