= Anwara Begum (academic) =

First Lady of Bangladesh from 2002 to 2009

- আনোয়ারা বেগম

13th First Lady of Bangladesh
- In role 6 September 2002 – 15 February 2009
- President: Iajuddin Ahmed
- Preceded by: Nur Akhtar (acting)
- Succeeded by: Rashida Hamid

Vice-Chancellor of Atish Dipankar University of Science and Technology
- In office 2004–2011
- Preceded by: Position established
- Succeeded by: Abul Hossain Sikder

Personal details
- Born: 1934/1935
- Died: 21 April 2018 (aged 83) Dhaka, Bangladesh
- Spouse: Iajuddin Ahmed
- Children: Imtiaz Ahmed Babu
- Occupation: Academic
- Awards: Ekushey Padak

Anwara Begum (1934/1935 – 21 April 2018) was a Bangladeshi academic. In 2006, she was awarded the Ekushey Padak by the government of Bangladesh for her contribution to education. She was married to the 14th President of Bangladesh, Iajuddin Ahmed, and served as the First Lady of Bangladesh from 2002 until 2009.

== Career ==
Begum was a professor at the Department of Zoology, University of Dhaka. She later served as the chairman of the Department of Zoology and the provost of the Shamsun Nahar Hall.

She was the first chairman of the board of trustees and the founding vice-chancellor of Atish Dipankar University of Science and Technology, a private university in Dhaka.

== Personal life ==
Begum and her husband, Iajuddin Ahmed, had a son, Imtiaz Ahmed Babu.
