= Osman Faruk =

Bangladeshi politician

- ওসমান ফারুক
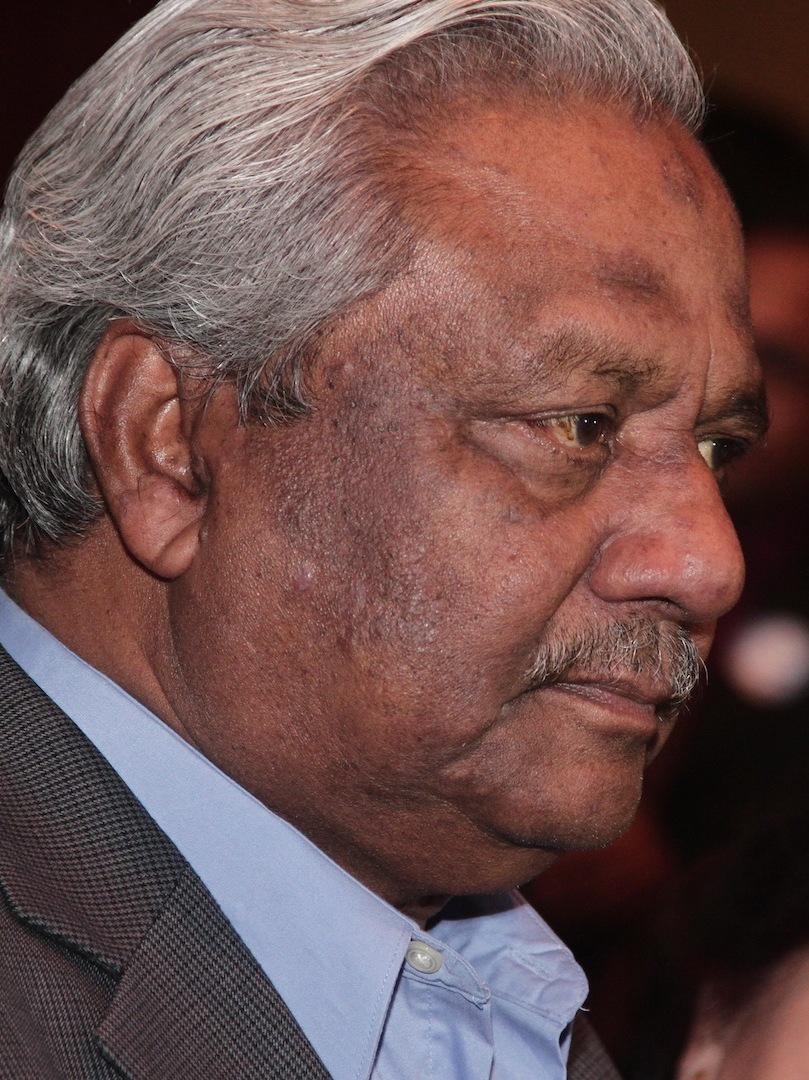
- Faruk in 2012

Minister of Education
- In office 10 October 2001 – 29 October 2006
- Prime Minister: Khaleda Zia
- Preceded by: ASHK Sadek
- Succeeded by: Nurul Islam Nahid

Member of Parliament for Kishoreganj-3
- In office 17 February – 14 November 2026
- Preceded by: Mujibul Haque

Member of Parliament for Kishoreganj-3
- In office 28 October 2001 – 27 October 2006
- Preceded by: Mizanul Haque
- Succeeded by: Abdul Hamid

Personal details
- Born: 18 July 1940 (age 86) Kishoreganj, Bengal Province, British Raj
- Party: Bangladesh Nationalist Party
- Relations: M Osman Ghani (Father) M. Osman Siddique (Brother)

Osman Faruk is a Bangladesh Nationalist Party (BNP) politician and a former minister of education of Bangladesh. He served as a BNP member representing the Kishoreganj-3 and Kishoreganj-4 constituencies.

== Early life ==
Faruk was born in Kishoreganj on 18 July 1940. He studied at the University of Dhaka before pursuing higher education at the University of Texas and Cornell University in the United States.

== Career ==
In 2001, after winning the Kishoreganj-4 constituency during the 2008 Bangladeshi general election, he was elected as a member of parliament and subsequently served as education minister in the BNP-led government.

In 2016, he was investigated for war crimes during the Bangladesh Liberation War. He has denied involvement in war crimes. He is an adviser to the former prime minister of Bangladesh, Khaleda Zia.

Faruk resigned from parliament after submitting a resignation letter expressing his intention to step down. His seat was declared vacant effective from 15 November 2026.
