= Mujibul Haque =

Bangladeshi politician

- মুজিবুল হক
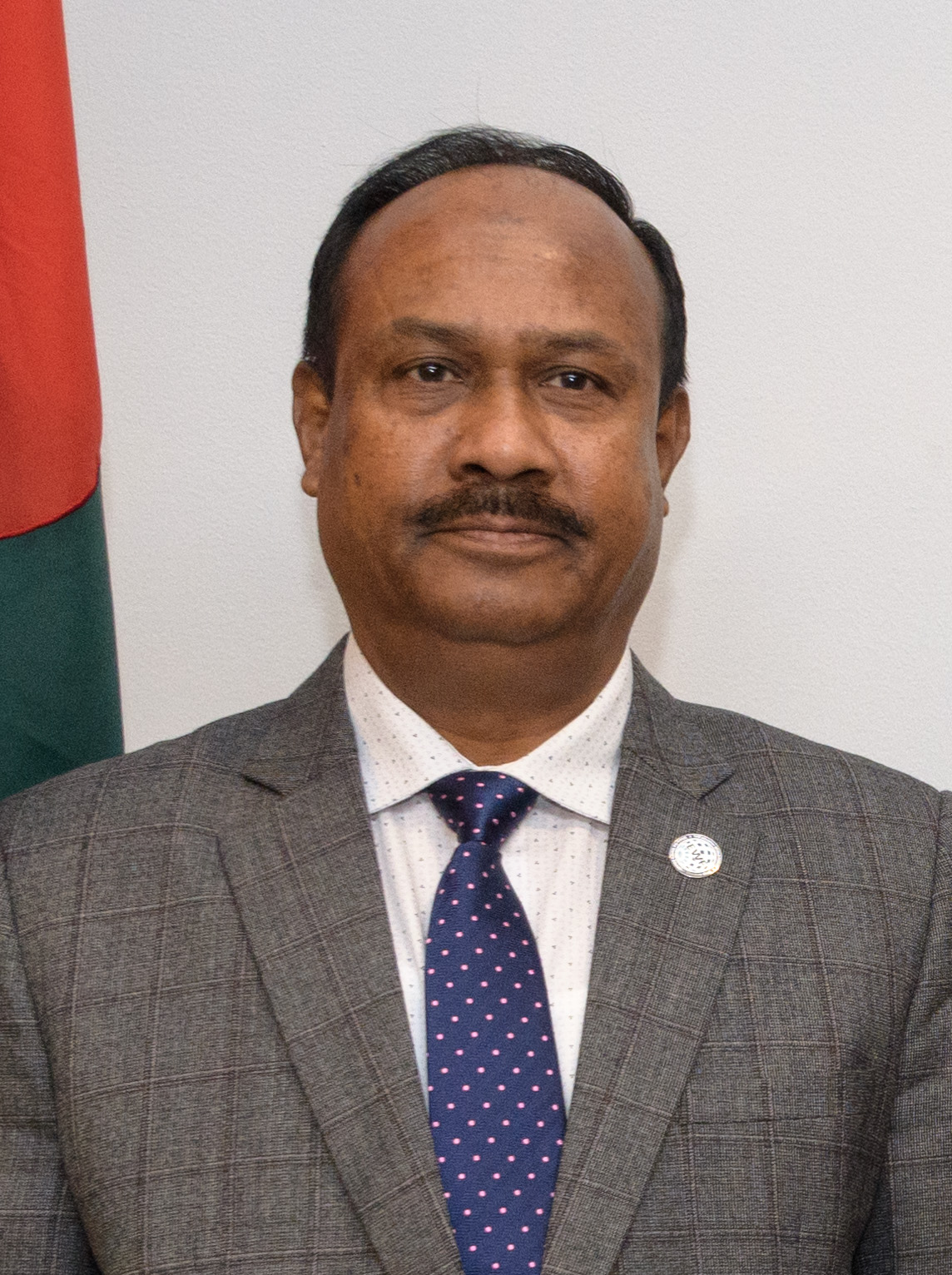
- Haque at the European Union in Brussels (2018)

Secretary General of Jatiya Party
- Incumbent
- Assumed office 9 October 2021- 7 July 2025
- Preceded by: Ziauddin Ahmed Bablu
- Succeeded by: Shamim Haider Patwary

Member of Parliament for Kishoreganj-3
- In office 25 January 2009 – 6 August 2024
- Preceded by: Sayed Ashraful Islam
- Succeeded by: Osman Faruk

Member of Parliament for Kishoreganj-4
- In office 10 July 1986 – 6 December 1990
- Preceded by: Position created
- Succeeded by: Mizanul Haque

Minister of State for Labour and Employment
- In office 14 January 2014 – 7 January 2019
- Preceded by: Monnujan Sufian
- Succeeded by: Monnujan Sufian

Minister of State for Youth and Sports
- In office 21 November 2013 – 12 January 2014
- Preceded by: Ahad Ali Sarker
- Succeeded by: Biren Sikder

Personal details
- Born: 1 September 1953 (age 73) Kishoreganj District, East Bengal, Dominion of Pakistan
- Party: Jatiya Party
- Education: University of Dhaka

Md Mujibul Haque Chunnu (born 1 September 1953) is a Jatiya Party politician and the former secretary general of the party. He is a former Jatiya Sangsad member representing the Kishoreganj-3 constituency during 2009–2024. He served as the state minister of labour and employment during 2014–2019.

== Early life ==
Mujibul Haque was born on 1 September 1953 to Abdul Malek and Harunnessa in Kajala Madhyapara, Tarail Upazila, Kishoreganj District, East Bengal, Pakistan. He completed his SSC in 1970 and HSC in 1972. He was a member of the Mukti Bahini and fought in the Bangladesh Liberation war in Sector-11. In 1980, he graduated from the University of Dhaka with a law degree and a master's degree in 1981.

== Career ==
Mujibul Haque was elected president of the Kishoreganj District unit of the Jatiya Party. He was elected to parliament as a candidate of the Jatiya Party from Kishoreganj-4 in 1986. He was re-elected in 1988. From August 1987 to 1988, he served as the deputy minister of land. He was elected to parliament again in 2008, 2014 and 2018. From 21 November 2013 to 12 January 2014, he was the state minister of youth and sports. Then he served as the state minister of labor and employment from 2014 to 2019.

Upon the death of Ziauddin Ahmed Bablu, Mujibul Haque was appointed as the secretary general of the Jatiya Party in October 2021.

== Personal life ==
Mujibul Haque is married to Rokhsana Kader. Together they have two sons, Ziaul Haque and Israrul Haque.
