= K. M. Aminul Haque =

Bangladeshi war criminal

- কে এম আমিনুল হক
- Born: Austagram Upazila, Kishoreganj District, Bangladesh
- Other name: Rajab Ali
- Known for: Convicted war criminal
- Criminal charge: Crimes against humanity
- Criminal penalty: Death sentence
- Criminal status: Incarcerated

K. M. Aminul Haque (also known as Rajab Ali) is a Bangladeshi national who was convicted of crimes against humanity committed during the Bangladesh Liberation War in 1971. He was sentenced to death by the International Crimes Tribunal on 5 November 2018.

== Early life ==
Haque was born in Austagram Upazila, Kishoreganj District. He was a student of the Gurudayal Government College. He was an activist of East Pakistan Islami Chhatra Sangha, the student wing of Jamaat-e-Islami.

== Career ==
During the Bangladesh Liberation War, Haque was a local commander of the paramilitary group Al-Badr in the then Kishoreganj sub-division (now district). According to tribunal findings, he was involved in murder, looting, arson, torture, and kidnapping in various areas, including Kishoreganj, Bhairab, Brahmanbaria, and Habiganj.

Haque reportedly received arms training at a Pakistan Army camp in Bhairab in 1971, after which he led a local unit of Al-Badr. He and his associates were found responsible for the killing of numerous civilians, including members of the Hindu community and Muslims. According to the prosecutors, 43 Hindus were killed in a raid on Krishnapur village in which he commanded along with Liakat.

After the Independence of Bangladesh, Haque surrendered to the Joint Forces on 18 December 1971. He was initially charged under the Bangladesh Collaborators Act in 1972 and sentenced to 40 years of imprisonment. In 1981, he was released through a clemency by President Ziaur Rahman and later moved abroad, reportedly to a Middle Eastern country and Pakistan. He wrote Al-Badr Bolchhi (I am Al-Badr speaking) about his work in the Al-Badr paramilitary. He also wrote Dui Polashi, Dui Mir Jafa. Both books spoke against the Bangladesh Liberation War and Sheikh Mujibur Rahman. He opened a medicine shop in Elephant Road, Dhaka.

Haque contested the General Election June 1996 as a candidate of the Islamic Sashantantrik Andolan from Kishoreganj-5. He finished 7th with 568 votes and lost to Mohammad Abdul Hamid of the Awami League who received 54,073. He returned to Dhaka in 1997. He last visited Pakistan in 2000.

In 2014, the International Crimes Tribunal began investigating Haque's activities during the war. He went into hiding in Dhanmondi and Kalabagan with his wife. They were financed by their daughters living outside of Bangladesh. He was indicted in 2015 and sentenced to death in 2018. He evaded arrest and remained a fugitive until 2 July 2022, when the Rapid Action Battalion arrested him in the Kalabagan area of Dhaka.

== Personal life ==
Haque is married and has two daughters. His daughters live in Singapore and Australia.
