= Amir Hossain =

Bangladeshi judge (1957–2021)

The Honourable Justice Amir Hossain
- আমির হোসেন
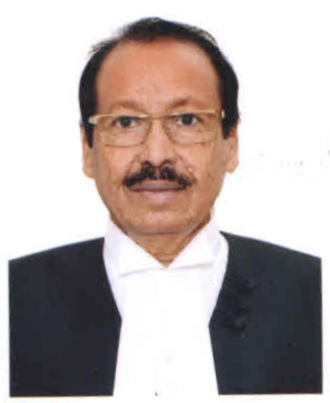
- Hossain in 2021

Justice at the High Court Division, Supreme Court of Bangladesh
- In office 12 February 2015 – 24 August 2021

Prosecutor at the International Crimes Tribunal
- In office 11 October 2017 – 24 August 2021

Personal details
- Born: 30 November 1957 Kishoreganj, Mymensingh District East Pakistan
- Died: 24 August 2021 (aged 63) Dhaka, Bangladesh
- Spouse: Shahima Chowdhury (m. 1982)
- Children: 3
- Education: University of Dhaka, National University
- Profession: Judge

Amir Hossain (Bengali: আমির হোসেন; 30 November 1957 - 24 August 2021) was a Bangladeshi judge at the High Court Division of the Supreme Court of Bangladesh. He also served as a prosecutor at the International Crimes Tribunal.

== Early life and education ==
Hossain was born on 30 November 1957 in Nilkli, Kishoreganj District, to Abdus Samad and Syedunnesa. He obtained a Secondary School Certificate from Nikli GC Pilot High School in 1973, and a Higher Secondary School Certificate from Gurudayal Government College in 1975. He obtained his LL.B and LL.M degree from the Department of Law, University of Dhaka.

== Career ==
Hossain participated in the Bangladesh Liberation War in 1971. He was trained in guerrilla warfare in the Mukti Bahini camps in the free territories. As a freedom fighter, he directly engaged in several battles within Sunamganj, Netrokona, and Kishoreganj sub-division under Sector 3.

Hossain joined the Judiciary of Bangladesh as Munsif (assistant judge) on 22 February 1984 and was promoted to District and Sessions Judge on 6 May 2009. He was elevated as an Additional Judge of the Supreme Court of Bangladesh, High Court Division, on 12 February 2015 and was appointed as a Judge of the same division on 12 February 2017.

On 11 October 2017, Hossain was appointed as a member of the International Crimes Tribunal (Bangladesh)-1. As a member of the tribunal, he passed several judgements against several perpetrators in the Liberation War of Bangladesh 1971 for their transgressions against humanity.

== Death ==
Hossain died on 24 August 2021 at the Combined Military Hospital, Dhaka, Bangladesh. He was buried in Nilkli, Kishoreganj.
