= Rebecca Sultana =

First Lady of Bangladesh

- রেবেকা সুলতানা
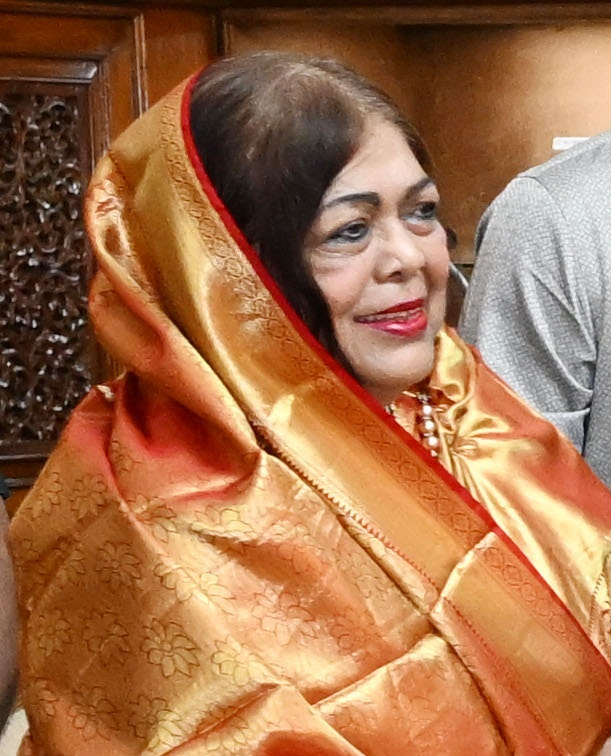
- Sultana in 2024

15th First Lady of Bangladesh
- In office 24 April 2023 – 24 July 2026
- President: Mohammed Shahabuddin
- Preceded by: Rashida Hamid
- Succeeded by: Rahat Ara Begum

Personal details
- Born: Dilalpur, Pabna
- Spouse: Mohammed Shahabuddin (m. 1972)
- Children: Arshad Adnan
- Parent: Ali Akter (father)

Rebecca Sultana (Bengali: রেবেকা সুলতানা) is a Bangladeshi academic and former civil servant who served as the first lady of Bangladesh from 2023 to 2026 as the wife of President Mohammed Shahabuddin. She is the first former bureaucrat to become first lady, and has held roles in both government and education, including as a university professor and advisor in higher education institutions.

== Career ==
Rebecca Sultana joined BCS administration cadre as Assistant Commissioner and retired in 2009 as Joint Secretary. She was a professor in the Department of Human Resources Program at Primeasia University and also Chief Advisor of Primeasia University and is serving as the Founder Chairman of Friends for Children Organization.

== Personal life ==
On 16 November 1972, Rebecca Sultana married Mohammed Shahabuddin. They have a son named Arshad Adnan, who produced several Bangladeshi films, including the highest grossing Bangladeshi film Priyotoma (2023).
