= Sheikh Mujibur Rahman Iqbal =

Bangladeshi politician (born 1963)

- শেখ মজিবুর রহমান ইকবাল

Member of the Bangladesh Parliament for Kishoreganj-5
- Incumbent
- Assumed office 17 February 2026
- Preceded by: Afzal Hossain

Personal details
- Born: 12 October 1963 (age 62) Bajitpur Upazila, Kishoreganj District
- Party: Bangladesh Nationalist Party

Sheikh Mujibur Rahman Iqbal is a Bangladeshi politician. As of March 2026, he is a member of parliament from Kishoreganj-5.

== Early life ==
Iqbal was born on 12 October 1963 at Bajitpur Upazila under Kishoreganj District.
