= Imdadul Haque =

Bangladeshi politician

Member of Bangladesh Parliament
- In office February 1996 – June 1996
- Preceded by: Abdul Hamid
- Succeeded by: Abdul Hamid

Personal details
- Political party: Bangladesh Nationalist Party

Imdadul Haque is a Bangladesh Nationalist Party politician and a former member of parliament for Kishoreganj-5.

== Career ==
Haque was elected to parliament from Kishoreganj-5 as a Bangladesh Nationalist Party candidate in February 1996.
