= Kabira Uddina Ahmed =

Bangladeshi politician (died 2025)

Member of Bangladesh Parliament
- In office February 1996 – June 1996
- Preceded by: Mizanul Haque
- Succeeded by: Mizanul Haque

Personal details
- Died: 2 January 2025
- Political party: Bangladesh Nationalist Party

Kabira Uddina Ahmed (died 2 January 2025) was a Bangladesh Nationalist Party politician who was a Member of Parliament from Kishoreganj-4.

== Life and career ==
Ahmed was elected to parliament from Kishoreganj-4 as a Bangladesh Nationalist Party candidate in February 1996. He died on 2 January 2025.
