= 2023 Bangladeshi presidential election =

- 13 February 2023 (Note: It was at first scheduled for 19 February, but Chuppu was declared elected unopposed on 13 February 2023)
- Registered: 349 Members of Parliament in the Jatiya Sangsad
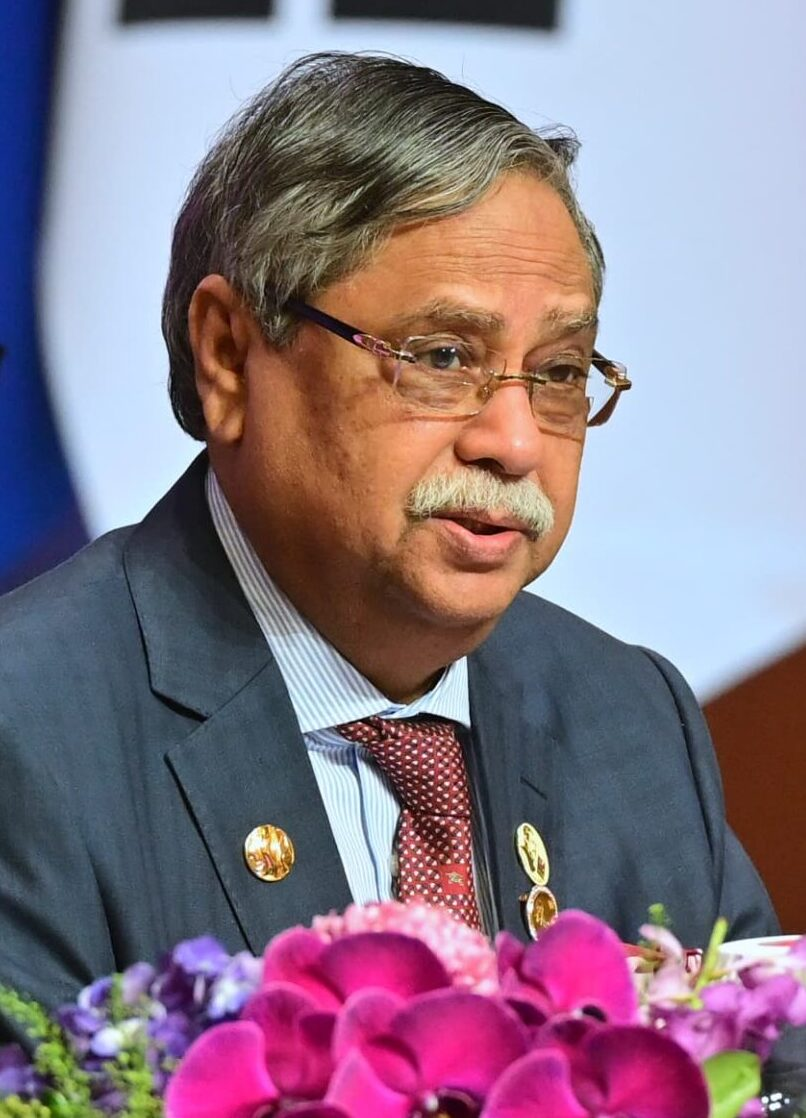
Nominee	Mohammed Shahabuddin
Party	AL
Electoral vote	325
Home district	Pabna
President before election
Mohammad Abdul Hamid
AL
Elected President
Mohammed Shahabuddin
AL

The 2023 Bangladeshi presidential election was scheduled for Sunday, 19 February 2023 to elect the 22nd president of Bangladesh. However, nominations closed at noon on 12 February and the Awami League politician Mohammed Shahabuddin, who had been nominated in accordance with the provisions of the Constitution, was the only candidate nominated. On 13 February 2023, Shahabuddin was thus officially elected as the country's 22nd president as he was unopposed.

Mohammed Shahabuddin was inaugurated for a five-year term on Monday, 24 April 2023.

== Background ==
As the ruling party Bangladesh Awami League has the majority of seats in the Jatiya Sangsad, and the constitution restricts cross-voting, the candidate nominated by the party is supposed to win the election. Besides, opposition parties had already declared that they won't nominate any candidate. Thus AL-nominated candidate Mohammed Shahabuddin won the election unopposed.

== Electoral system ==
The president is elected by an indirect election by the members of parliament as per Article 48 of the Constitution. However, since 1991, when parliamentary government system was restored in Bangladesh, all of government party candidates have been elected uncontestedly.

== Election schedule ==
The election schedule was announced by the Chief Election Commissioner Kazi Habibul Awal on 25 January 2023, after meeting with the Speaker of the Jatiya Sangsad Shirin Sharmin Chaudhury the day before.

Schedule for the 2023 Bangladesh presidential election
Event	Date	Day
Election Date Announcement	25.01.2023	Wednesday
Last Date for Filling Nomination	12.02.2023	Sunday
Nomination Scrutiny	13.02.2023	Monday
Last Date for Nomination Withdrawal	14.02.2023	Tuesday
Polling and Results	19.02.2023	Sunday

== Electoral college ==
On 6 December 2022, seven Members of Parliament (MP) affiliated with the Bangladesh Nationalist Party (BNP) resigned as part of their anti-government protests. Before the declaration of presidential election schedule, the Election Commission of Bangladesh published the voter list which listed 343 members, as seven seats were vacant. On 1 February 2023, by-elections were held among the six directly elected seats. Although the Election Commission at first indicated that the by-election winners will not be included in the electoral college, the commission eventually published a revised gazette on 9 February which was composed of 349 members, after the six MPs took their oath on 8 February.

2023 Bangladeshi presidential election Electoral College
Party	Electorate(s)
Bangladesh Awami League	305
Jatiya Party-JaPa (Ershad)	27
Workers Party of Bangladesh	4
Jatiya Samajtantrik Dal-JaSaD (Inu)	3
Bikalpa Dhara Bangladesh	2
Gano Forum	2
Jatiya Party-JP (Manju)	1
Bangladesh Tarikat Federation	1
Independents	4
Total	349

== Candidates ==
Candidate	Born	Nominator party	Positions held	Home district	Date announced	Ref.
Mohammed Shahabuddin Chuppu	10 December 1949 (aged 73); Shivrampur, Pabna	Bangladesh Awami League	Commissioner of the Anti-Corruption Commission (2011–2016); Member of the Bangladesh Judicial Service Association (1982–2006); General Secretary (1995–1997)	Pabna	12 February 2023	

== Aftermath ==
=== Responses ===
==== National ====
===== Political parties =====
Bangladesh Nationalist Party-BNP had already expressed their disinterest in the election, as they were already protesting for the resignation of the Hasina-led government.

Before the election, parliamentary main opposition party Jatiya Party-JaPa (Ershad) had said that they won't nominate any candidate for the election.

As Mohammed Shahabuddin was nominated for the election, JaPa's chairman Ghulam Muhammed Quader welcomed him and hoped that "he would discharge the duty with sincerity for betterment of the country and the nation". About the responses by others, he said, "The parties which are raising questions about the election, have they not seen the constitution? It is clearly said in the constitution that the party with majority can elect the president. Awami League has majority in the Parliament. They can constitutionally elect the President".

There were mixed reactions form leftist political parties.

==== International ====
===== Organizations =====
- United Nations: The national chapter of the UN congratulated Mohammed Shahabuddin for being appointed for the post of President of the republic in a press release on 14 February. On the statement the organization also hoped that "the UN will extend its partnership with Bangladesh under his leadership to achieve Bangladesh's commitments towards implementing the SDGs and the UN charter".

===== Nations =====
- China: The President of China Xi Jinping congratulated President Shahabuddin by sending a later on 24 April 2023 and said that he would be willing to work with him to enhance traditional friendship between China and Bangladesh
- India: Indian prime minister Narendra Modi has extended his congratulations to President-elect of Bangladesh Md Shahabuddin on 5 March 2023.
- Oman: Sultan Haitham bin Tariq has sent a cable of congratulations to President Shahabuddin.
- Russia: Russian president Vladimir Putin's congratulation message to Shahabuddin was released by the Russian Embassy in Dhaka on 28 February.
- Saudi Arabia: The King of Saudi Arabia and Mohammad bin Salman bin Abdulaziz Al Saud, the Crown Prince and Prime Minister of Saudi Arabia, has sent a cable of congratulation to Shahabuddin on his election as President
- United Arab Emirates: UAE president Sheikh Mohamed bin Zayed Al Nahyan has sent a message of congratulations to Mohammed Shahabuddin and UAE vice president, Prime Minister and Ruler of Dubai Sheikh Mohammed bin Rashid Al Maktoum also dispatched similar messages on 24 April 2024
- The heads of the state and government of Kuwait, Qatar, Bahrain and other countries also congratulated him.
- Pakistan: The President of Islamic Republic of Pakistan Dr. Arif Alvi also wished Mohammed Shahabuddin. Taking to his Twitter handle, the president wrote: "I am confident that during your tenure our brotherly ties would be further strengthened. I wish you a very successful term in office and look forward to working closely with you for the mutual benefit of our countries."

=== Inauguration ===
The inauguration of the president of Bangladesh is a ceremony to mark the commencement of a new five-year term of the president of Bangladesh. The inauguration takes place on the day following the expiry of the term of office of the preceding president. No location is specified in the constitution, but all inaugurations have taken place in Darbar Hall in Bangabhaban palace. The ceremony is transmitted live by national broadcaster BTV on its principal television and radio channels, typically from around 11 am. To highlight the significance of the event, all key figures in the executive (the government of Bangladesh), the legislature (Sangsad) and the judiciary attend, as do members of the diplomatic corps and other invited guests.
