= Daily Banglar Bani =

Bangladeshi national newspaper

- Type: Daily newspaper
- Format: Broadsheet
- Founder(s): Hafiz Hafizur Rahman and Sheikh Fazlul Haque Mani
- Founded: 1969
- Language: Bengali

Daily Banglar Bani was a Bangladeshi national newspaper published in the Bengali language. Banglar Bani had a secular ideology and was pro Bangladesh Awami League. It has closed down.

== History ==
The Daily Banglar Bani started publication in 1969 by Hafiz Hafizur Rahman and Sheikh Fazlul Haque Mani as a weekly backed by Sheikh Mujibur Rahman. Sheikh Fazlul Haque Mani, a politician of Bangladesh Awami League and the nephew of President Sheikh Mujibur Rahman. Journalist Anwarul Islam Bobby supported Mani in founding the newspaper.

During the Bangladesh Liberation war in 1971, the Daily Banglar Bani was published from Kolkata. During the war, the office of newspaper in Dhaka was damaged by Pakistan Army shells which targeted opposition newspapers The Daily Ittefaq, and The People. After the independence of Bangladesh, Banglar Bani started daily publication in Dhaka from 21 February 1972. The pro-Mujib paper received more in payments for government advertising than any other paper when the Awami League government was in power.

Shahabuddin Chuppu, future president of Bangladesh, worked at the Daily Banglar Bani from 1980 to 1982. Obaidul Quader is a former assistant editor of Banglar Bani. Falguni Hamid previously worked as a reporter at Daily Banglar Bani.

Sheikh Moni was a rival of Tajuddin Ahmed and would write editorials against him in the paper in 1974. The newspaper was banned in February 1987 by the government of General Hussain Mohammad Ershad for accusing the government of supplying weapons to militias. In the 1990s, Islamic fundamentalist called for the newspaper to be closed.

According to a 2007 extortion case by businessman Azam J Chowdhury against former Prime Minister Sheikh Hasina, five million BDT of a 29.9 million BDT bribe was deposited in an account of Banglar Bani.
