= Md. Afzal Hossain =

Bangladeshi politician

- আফজাল হোসেন

Member of the Bangladesh Parliament for Kishoreganj-5
- In office 29 December 2008 – 6 August 2024

Personal details
- Born: 9 January 1964 (age 62) Dhaka, East Pakistan, Pakistan
- Party: Bangladesh Awami League
- Children: 5

Md. Afzal Hossain (born 9 January 1964) is a Bangladeshi businessman and politician. He is a former Jatiya Sangsad member who represented the Kishoreganj-5 constituency.

== Early life ==
Hossain was born on 9 January 1964 in the village of Noapara Saserdighi in Bajitpur, Dhaka, Bangladesh. His father's name was Md. Abu Bakkar Siddique and his mother's name was Mosha: Rezia Khatun. He is married and has four daughters and one son.

== Career ==
Hossain is the General Secretary of Dhaka Trade Center Shop Owners Association of Gulistan. He has been serving as the organizing secretary of the central committee of the Awami League since 26 December 2019.

Hossain was elected member of parliament from Kishoreganj-5 constituency on the nomination of Awami League in the ninth parliamentary election of 2008. He was elected to parliament on 5 January 2014 from Kishoreganj-5 as an Awami League candidate. He was re-elected as a member of parliament from the same constituency in the eleventh parliamentary election of 2018.

Hossain was elected to parliament from Kishoreganj-5 as an Awami League candidate on 7 January 2024. Following the fall of the Sheikh Hasina led Awami League government, he was detained from Meherpur in March 2025.
