= Mohammed Shahabuddin =

President of Bangladesh from 2023 to 2026

- মোহাম্মদ সাহাবুদ্দিন
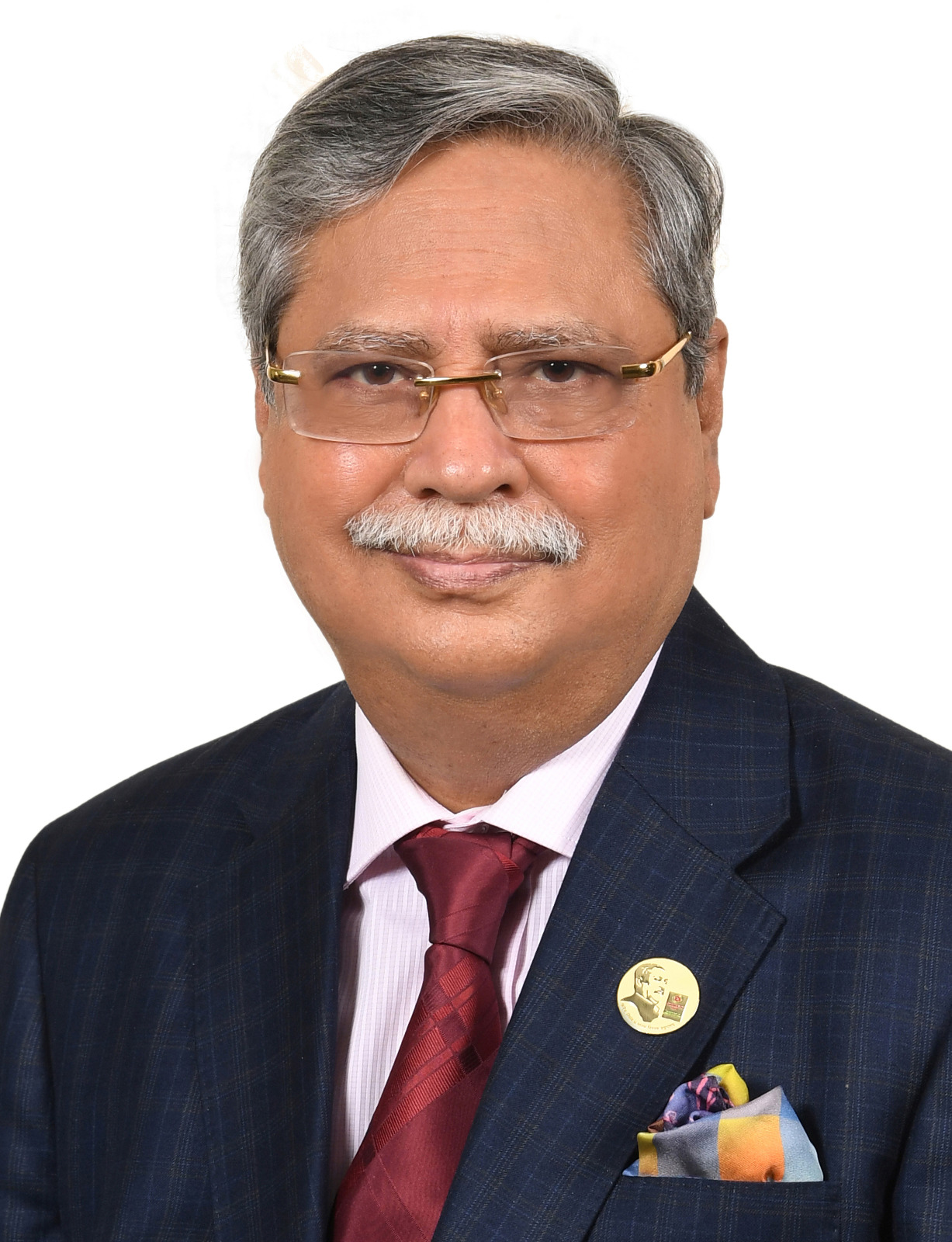
- Official portrait, 2023

President of Bangladesh
- In office 24 April 2023 – 24 July 2026
- Prime Minister: Sheikh Hasina; Muhammad Yunus (as Chief Adviser); Tarique Rahman
- Preceded by: Mohammad Abdul Hamid
- Succeeded by: Mirza Fakhrul Islam Alamgir

Personal details
- Born: 10 December 1949 (age 76) Pabna, East Bengal, Dominion of Pakistan
- Party: Independent
- Other political affiliations: Awami League (1971–2024); East Pakistan Awami League (1967–1971)
- Spouse: Rebecca Sultana (m. 1972)
- Children: Arshad Adnan
- Education: Shahid Aminuddin Law College
- Nickname: Chuppu

Military service
- Allegiance: Bangladesh
- Branch/service: Mujib Bahini
- Battles/wars: Bangladesh Liberation War

Mohammed Shahabuddin (Note: Bengali: মোহাম্মদ সাহাবুদ্দিন, romanized: Môhammod śahabuddin, pronounced [ˈmoɦɑmmod ˈʃɑɦɑbudːin]. (Note: His name is mentioned as মোঃ সাহাবুদ্দিন in the government gazette (see here), and Bangabhaban website.)) (born 10 December 1949), also known as Chuppu, is a Bangladeshi politician, former jurist and journalist who served as the president of Bangladesh from 2023 to 2026. He was elected unopposed in the 2023 presidential election as the nominee of the then-ruling Awami League. He is the first and only president of Bangladesh to administer the oath of three different governments. Prior to his presidency, Shahabuddin served as a district and sessions judge and a commissioner of the Anti-Corruption Commission from 2011 to 2016.

Shahabuddin was involved in Awami League politics during his student years but never formally joined politics afterward. During the regime of Sheikh Hasina, he publicly expressed support for the Awami League on various occasions. Following Hasina's resignation, Shahabuddin has since become the target of criticism and debate amongst several political parties, with some questioning his political neutrality as president. On July 24, 2026 he stepped down citing ill health.

== Early life and education ==
Shahabuddin was born on 10 December 1949 in the Jubilee Tank area in Shivrampur of Pabna District in erstwhile East Bengal, Dominion of Pakistan (present-day Pabna, Bangladesh). His parents were Sharfuddin Ansari and Khairunnessa.

Shahabuddin went to Pabna's Purbatan Gandhi School and later was admitted to Radhanagar Majumdar Academy at fourth grade where he passed SSC examination in 1966. He then passed HSC and bachelor's from Govt. Edward College, Pabna in 1968 and 1972 respectively. He then obtained master's in psychology from the University of Rajshahi in 1974, and then LLB from Shahid Aminuddin Law College in 1975.

== Career ==
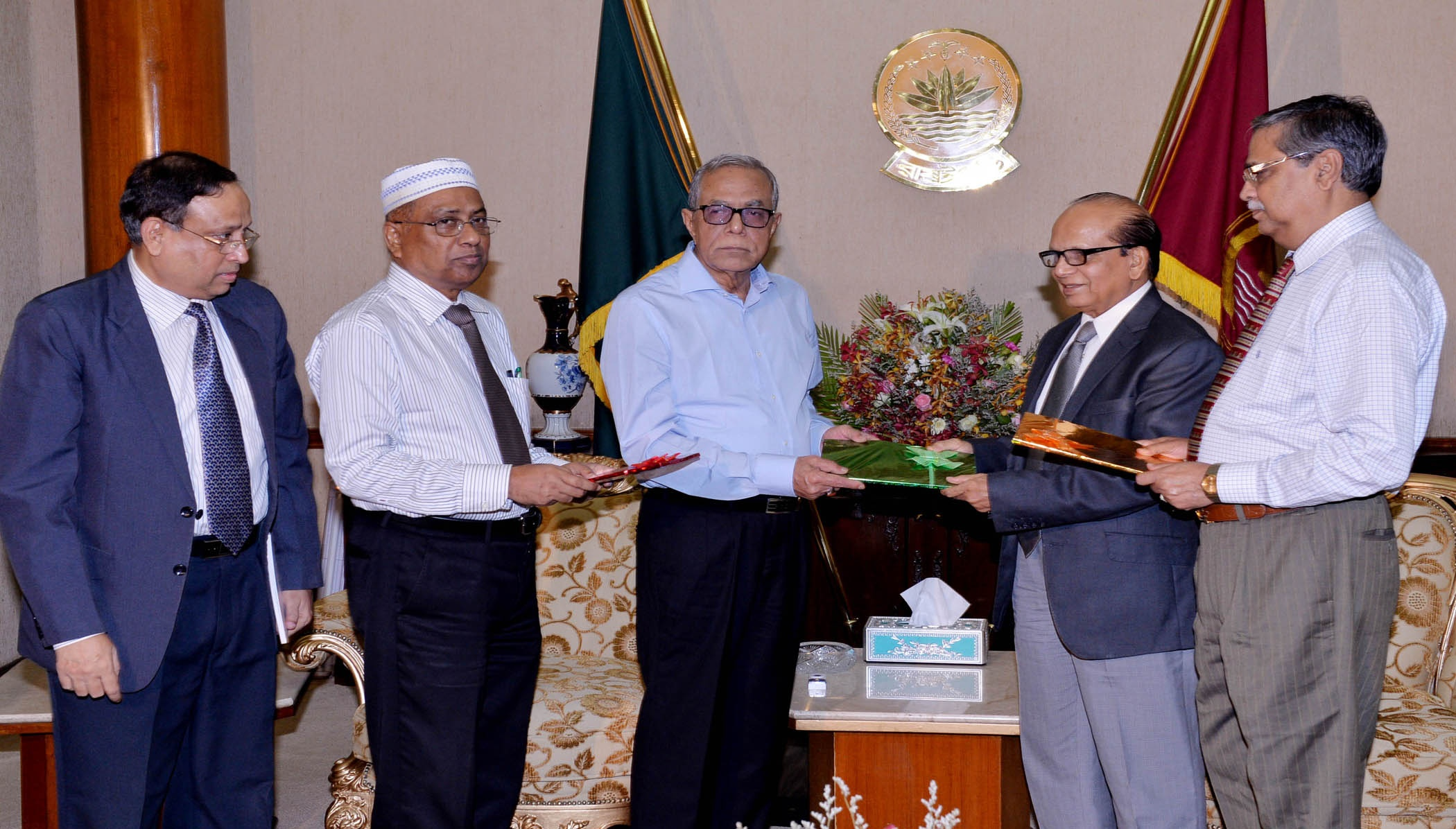
Shahabuddin (on the right) as a commissioner of Anti-Corruption Commission along with the chairman M Badiuzzaman and other members submitting annual report of the commission to President Abdul Hamid in 2015.

=== Political ===
Shahabuddin was a student leader of the Awami League during the late 1960s and early 1970s. He was the general secretary of the Pabna Edward College unit of the Chhatra League, and president of the Pabna District Chhatra League and Jubo League. He was the Pabna District convenor of the Shadhin Bangla Chhatra Shongram Parishad. He participated in the Liberation War as a freedom fighter. He was the joint secretary of the Bangladesh Krishak Sramik Awami League (BAKSAL) of the district unit and publicity secretary of the Awami League district unit. He was imprisoned after the assassination of Sheikh Mujibur Rahman in 1975 for three years.

=== Legal career ===
Mohammed Shahabuddin worked as a journalist for Daily Banglar Bani from 1980–1982. In 1982, Shahabuddin joined as a Munsef (Civil Judge) of the Judicial cadre in the Bangladesh Civil Service (BCS). He was finally promoted to the post of District and Sessions Judge, the highest position of the Bangladesh Judicial Service. He was elected to serve as General Secretary of the Bangladesh Judicial Service Association in 1995 and 1996. Following the 2001 general election, he chaired the judicial inquiry commission investigating crimes—including murder, rape, and looting—allegedly committed by leaders and activists of the BNP-Jamaat alliance.

In 2011, he was appointed as a commissioner of Anti-Corruption Commission from 2011, which he served until 2016.

Shahabuddin was appointed by the Ministry of Law, Justice and Parliamentary Affairs to serve as a coordinator in the trial to prosecute the assassins of Sheikh Mujibur Rahman. He served as Election Commissioner in the 2022 National Council of Bangladesh Awami League.

In 2017, Shahabuddin was appointed an independent director of Islami Bank Bangladesh Limited. In February 2023, Shahabuddin resigned from the board of directors of Islami Bank Bangladesh Limited after being elected president of Bangladesh.

== Presidency (2023–2026) ==
=== Election ===
Gazette published by Cabinet Division

Shahabuddin was nominated by the Awami League Parliamentary Party as their candidate for President of Bangladesh. On 12 February 2023, he submitted his application to the Chief Election Commissioner and the Presidential Election Officer at the Election Commission for the presidential election, the only candidate to do so. Shahabuddin then held a tête-à-tête with Prime Minister Sheikh Hasina at Ganabhaban. His nomination was welcomed by the opposition Jatiya Party, while the Bangladesh Nationalist Party expressed their disinterest. On 13 February 2023, he was officially elected as the country's 22nd president as he was unopposed. The result was declared by the Chief Election Commissioner Kazi Habibul Awal.

=== Inauguration ===
Shahabuddin was sworn in as the 22nd President of Bangladesh in a ceremony at the Bangabhaban on 24 April 2023. Jatiya Sangsad Speaker Shirin Sharmin Chaudhury administered the oath. Prime Minister Sheikh Hasina, Chief Justice Hasan Foez Siddique, Sheikh Rehana, cabinet members, and other guests attended the state ceremony. After the swearing-in ceremony, Shahabuddin and outgoing president Mohammad Abdul Hamid officially switched their seats as part of the ceremony of changing the charge of the office. Shahabuddin and Speaker Shirin Sharmin Chaudhury signed the oath documents of the office.

=== Tenure ===
In December 2023, Shahabuddin vetoed the Labour Bill 2023 which was passed by the Parliament and sent it for reconsideration.

=== Incidents following July Uprising ===
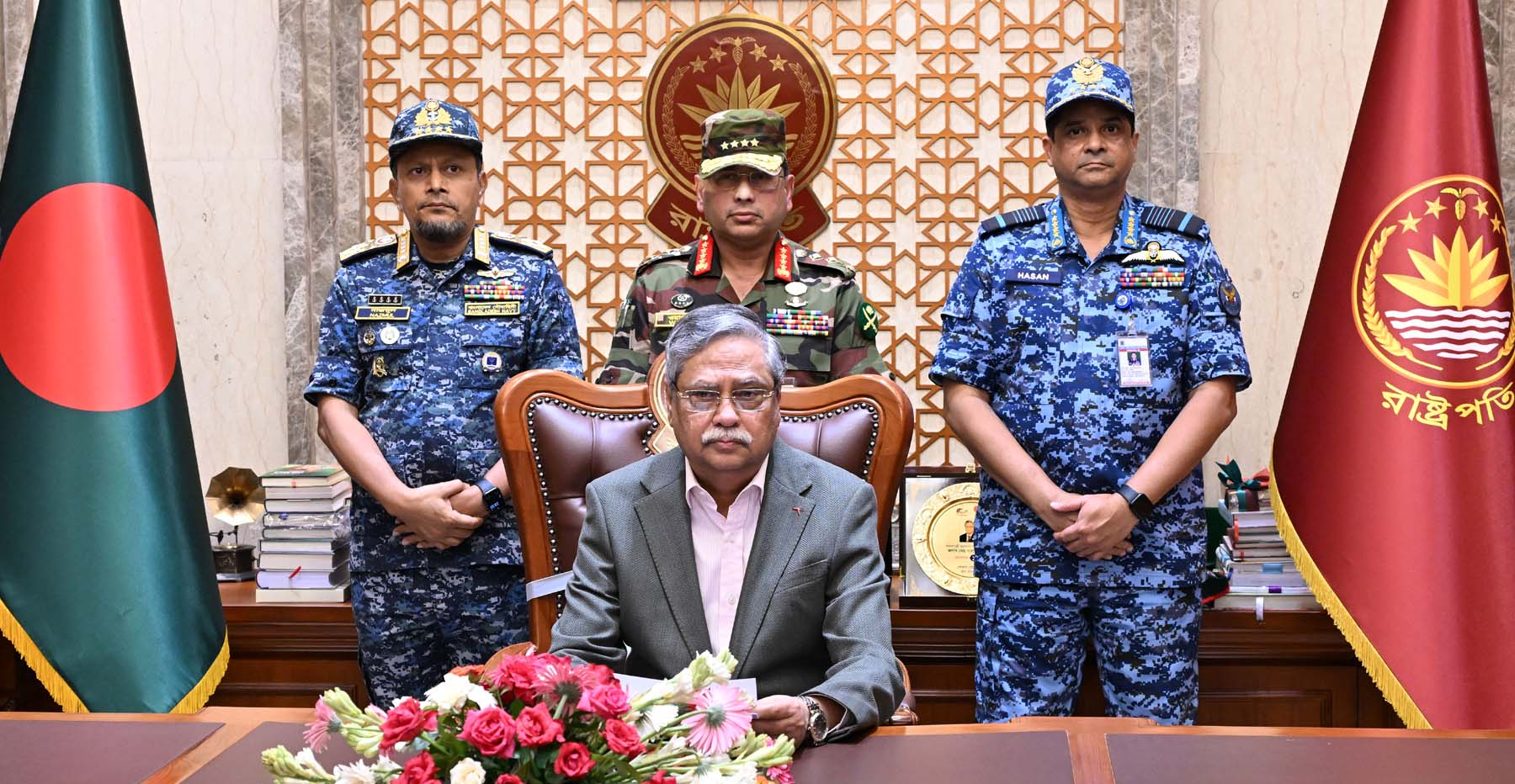
President Shahabuddin with armed forces chiefs on 6 August 2024, in the aftermath of resignation of Sheikh Hasina

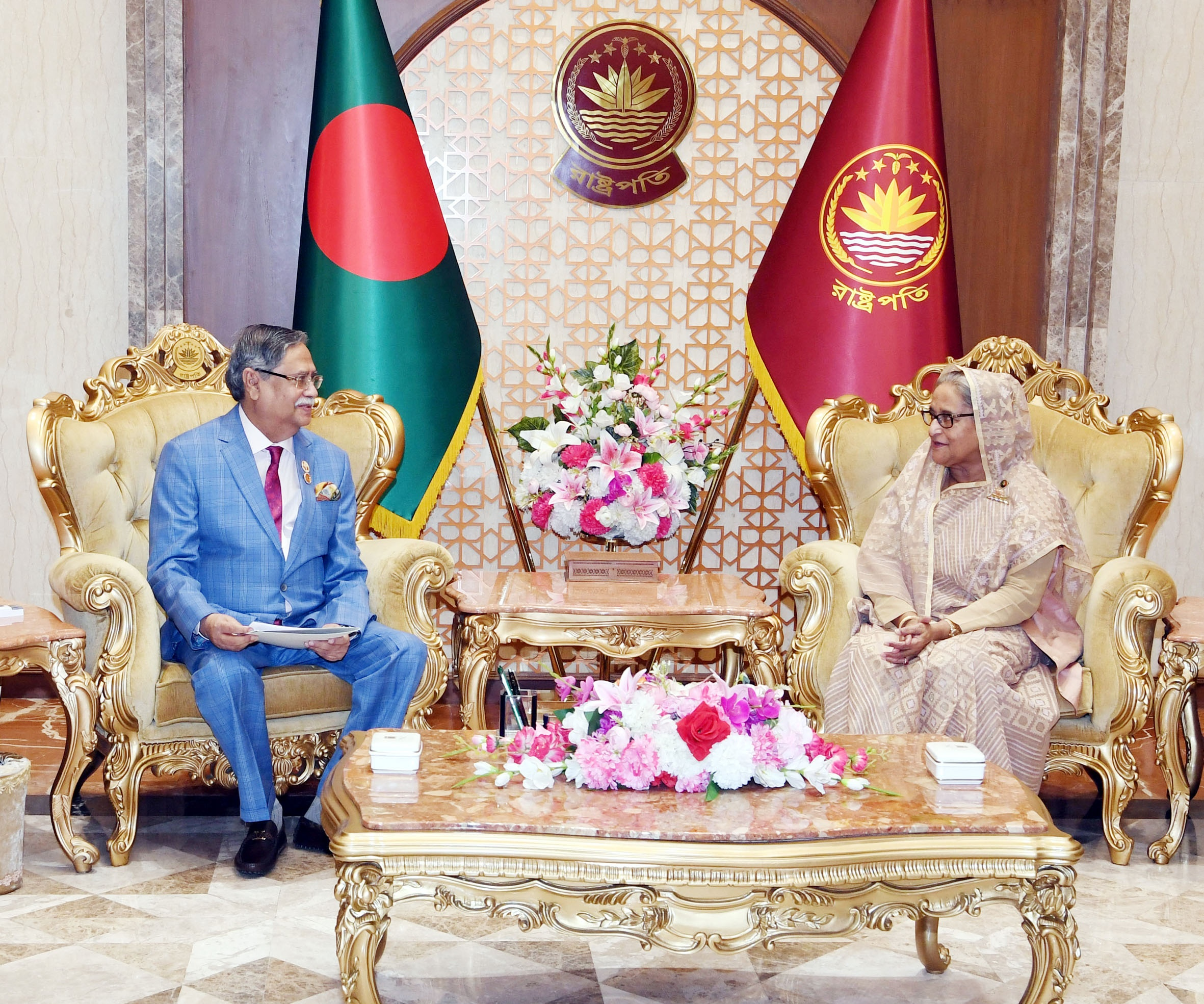
Shahabuddin with Sheikh Hasina as the Prime Minister in January 2024

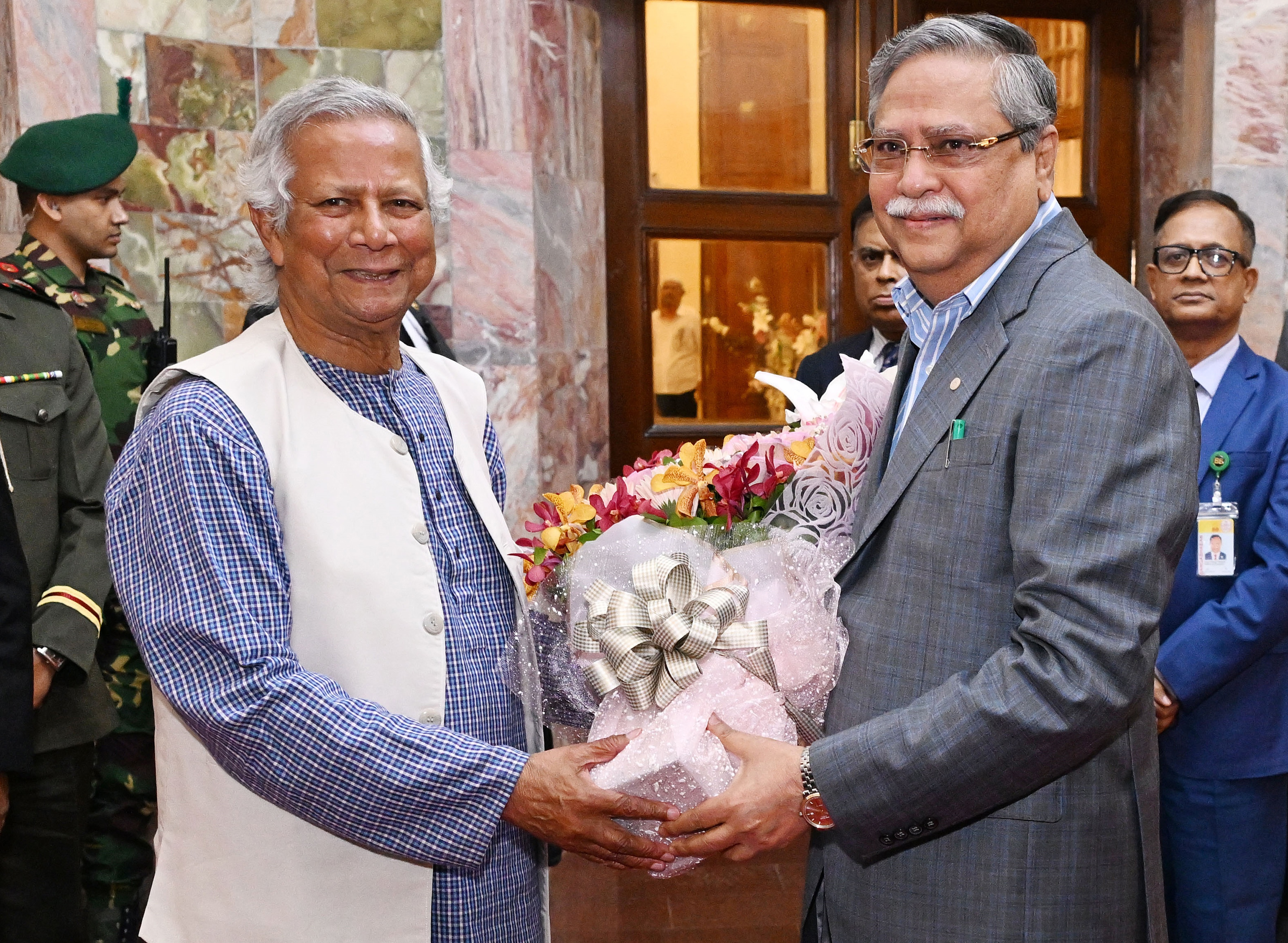
Shahabuddin with Muhammad Yunus as the Chief Adviser in August 2024

On 5 August 2024, the Chief of the Army Staff, General Waker-uz-Zaman announced the resignation of Prime Minister Sheikh Hasina following the Non-cooperation movement (2024). President Shahabuddin addressed the nation on 5 August 2024 and stated that Hasina had resigned. However he later stated that "he had heard Sheikh Hasina resigned from the post of prime minister, but he had no documentary evidence to support this".

He immediately started the process of meeting with political leaders from around the country to discuss the formation of an interim government. He also dissolved the parliament and ordered the release of former Prime Minister Khaleda Zia from house arrest.

On 6 August 2024, Shahabuddin, as Commander-in-Chief of the Bangladesh Armed Forces, issued a major reshuffle of the Bangladesh Army, which included the demotion or discharging of several Awami League-aligned officers, including Major General Ziaul Ahsan. Nasimul Gani was appointed Secretary of the Public Department of the President's Office.

On 8 August 2024, Shahabuddin swore in Nobel laureate Muhammad Yunus as Chief Adviser along with members of his interim government at the Bangabhaban. The interim government was dissolved on 17 February 2026 following the swearing-in of the Tarique ministry. During its tenure, as the parliament was in dissolved state, the interim administration promulgated a total of 133 ordinances which were approved and signed by the president. Of these, 17 were issued in 2024, 80 in 2025, and 36 between January and February 2026. One notable order titled the "July National Charter (Constitution Reform) Implementation Order, 2025" was also issued following consensus among the political parties in Bangladesh.

On 10 August 2024, following the resignation of Chief Justice Obaidul Hassan, President Shahabuddin appointed Syed Refaat Ahmed as Chief Justice. After the interim government's tenure, Sahabuddin criticized Muhammad Yunus for repeatedly failing to follow constitutional provisions and praised the Bangladesh Nationalist Party for their support. During the interim government, Shahabuddin claimed he was largely isolated and reportedly faced attempts to remove him.

=== 13th general election and subsequent incidents ===
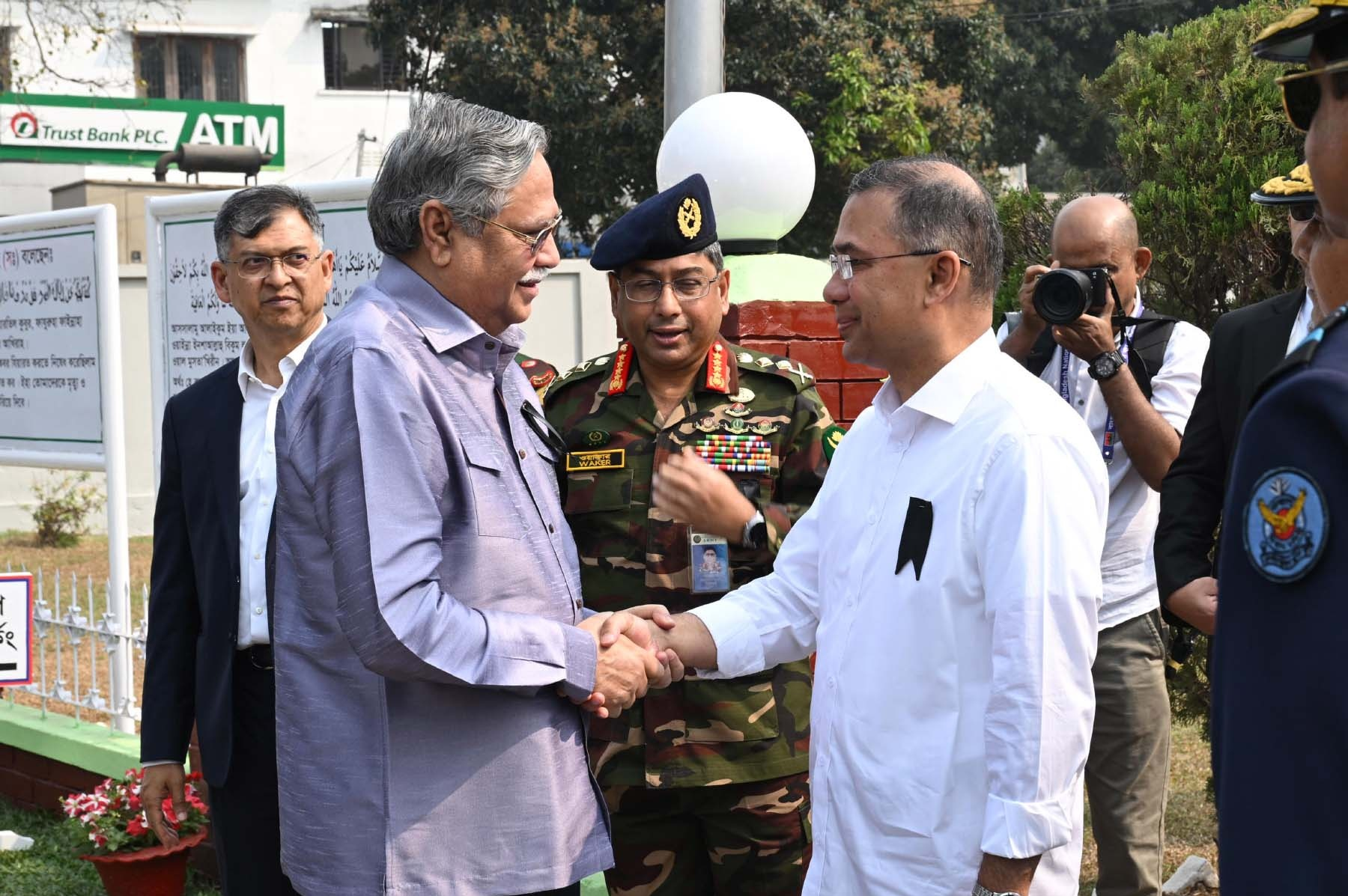
Shahabuddin greeting with Prime Minister Tarique Rahman in February 2026.

The 13th general election and a constitutional referendum were held on 12 February 2026 in Bangladesh, in which the Bangladesh Nationalist Party, led by Tarique Rahman, won a landslide victory. Tarique Rahman was elected Prime Minister by the confidence of the majority of Members of Parliament and subsequently formed the government.

Mohammed Shahabuddin administered the oath of office to the cabinet, led by Prime Minister Tarique Rahman, on 17 February 2026. Nahid Islam, Member of Parliament from Dhaka-11 and Chief Whip of the opposition demanded impeachment and arrest of Shahabuddin, calling him as an associate of the July massacre.

Opposition leader of the parliament Shafiqur Rahman criticised Mohammed Shahabuddin, stating that he had neither protested nor acted against the killings during the tenure of Sheikh Hasina and had lost credibility by providing misleading statements to the nation, including contradicting his 5 August 2024 claim regarding the resignation of Sheikh Hasina as the Prime Minister. At the first session of the 13th National Parliament, opposition members staged a walkout in protest against President Mohammed Shahabuddin as soon as he began his address.

=== Resignation ===
In July 2026, Bangladeshi intelligence agencies (including the NTMC, DGFI, and NSI) reported that Shahabuddin had conducted backchannel communications with ousted Prime Minister Sheikh Hasina and met exiled Awami League officials during a May 2026 medical trip to London. Shahabuddin rejected the reports as "false".

On 24 July 2026, following mounting political pressure, he stepped down from his position citing incapacitation from autonomic neuropathy, heart disease, and diabetes. Speaker Hafiz Uddin Ahmad subsequently assumed duties as acting President pursuant to Article 54 of the Bangladeshi Constitution.

== Controversies ==
=== Dispute over former Prime Minister Sheikh Hasina's resignation ===
Following the resignation of Sheikh Hasina, Shahabuddin, in a video statement, stated that Hasina had resigned. Later in October 2024, during a conversation with Manab Zamin's chief editor, he stated that

I tried [to collect the resignation letter] many times but failed. Maybe she did not get the time. When things came under control, one day the cabinet secretary came to collect the copy of the resignation letter. I told him that I too am looking for it,

This triggered a demand for his resignation. However, Shahabuddin later issued an official statement where he stated that resignation of Sheikh Hasina is a settled matter and urged all not to create any controversy regarding this.

=== Walkout of opposition MPs during presidential speech ===
On 12 March 2026, during the first session of the 13th Jatiya Sangsad, Speaker Hafizuddin Ahmed announced that Shahabuddin would be delivering a speech, soon MPs of the 11 Party Alliance began displaying cards and chanting slogans. Speaker Hafizuddin Ahmed then requested the MPs to take their seats and maintain order. Shortly after Shahabuddin begin his speech the Opposition MPs walked out.

=== Shift in political stance ===
Shahabuddin was a member of the Awami League and admirer of Sheikh Hasina and Sheikh Mujibur Rahman. He was a critic of the Bangladesh Nationalist Party but following the 2026 General Election and Tarique Rahman's takeover as the Prime Minister Shahabuddin criticised Sheikh Hasina's government for the July massacre and described the regime as fascist. He praised former Prime Minister Khaleda Zia and former President and Chief of Army Staff Ziaur Rahman.

== Personal life ==
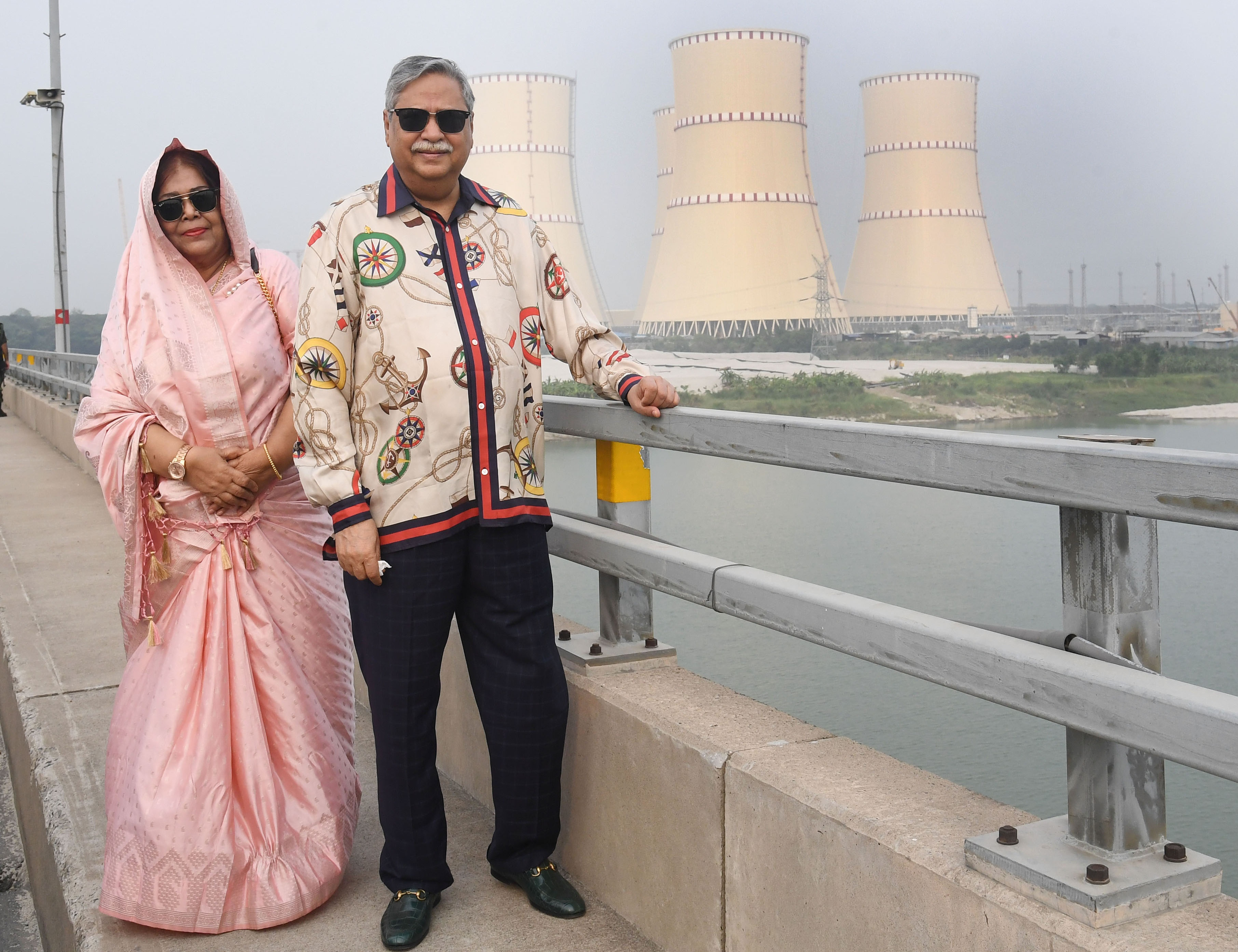
Shahabuddin with First Lady Rebecca Sultana visiting Rooppur Nuclear Power Plant in June 2024.

Since November 1972, Shahabuddin has been married to Rebecca Sultana, a former joint secretary to the government of Bangladesh. She also served as the faculty member of Primeasia University and the founding chairperson of Friends for Children Organization. Together they have a son, Arshad Adnan, who produced several Bangladeshi films. Adnan was a member of Awami League's subcommittee for cultural affairs in 2023.

== Honours ==
In his honour, a park built by the Pabna Municipality in 2020 was named "Bir Muktijoddha Mohammad Sahabuddin Chuppu Amusement Park".

== See also ==
- List of international presidential trips made by Mohammed Shahabuddin

Political offices
| Preceded by Mohammad Abdul Hamid | President of Bangladesh; 2023–2026 | Succeeded by |
Order of precedence
| Preceded by Mohammad Abdul Hamid as former President | Order of precedence of Bangladesh as former President | Followed by Mirza Abbas as Cabinet minister |
