= Shahid Syed Nazrul Islam Medical College =

Government medical college located in Kishoreganj District, Bangladesh

Shaheed Syed Nazrul Islam Medical College
- শহীদ সৈয়দ নজরুল ইসলাম মেডিকেল কলেজ
- Logo of Shahid Syed Nazrul Islam Medical College
- Type: Public medical school
- Established: 2011
- Academic affiliations: University of Dhaka
- Principal: Dr. Ashutosh Shaha Roy
- Academic staff: 20
- Students: About 450
- Location: Kishoreganj, Bangladesh; 24.7617°N 90.3993°E
- Campus: Urban
- Language: English
- Website: www.ssnimc.gov.bd

Shahid Syed Nazrul Islam Medical College (Bengali: শহীদ সৈয়দ নজরুল ইসলাম মেডিকেল কলেজ) is a government medical school in Bangladesh, established in 2011. It is located at Kishoreganj. The college is affiliated with University of Dhaka as a constituent college.

It offers 5 years MBBS degree programme and used to admit 65 students every year till 2023. But in 2024, from its 13th batch, 100 student can be admitted.

== History ==
Shahid Syed Nazrul Islam Medical College was established in 2011. It was named after Syed Nazrul Islam, the first acting President of Bangladesh.

In the year 2010–2011, Bangladesh government approved a measure to establish 4 medical colleges at Jessore, Satkhira, Kishoreganj and Kushtia with a view to improve the healthcare services in the country. The Executive Committee of the National Economic Council (ECNEC) endorsed the project. An estimated cost of Tk 5.45 billion was approved as budget to establish Shahid Syed Nazrul Islam Medical College. The project encompassed the construction of a six-story hospital building, a five-story academic building for the college, a nurses training center, student hostel, internee doctors' hostel, doctors' dormitory, staff nurses' dormitory, mosque, auditorium, principal and directors' residential buildings. Additionally, it involved the installation of a gymnasium, procurement of equipment, acquisition of one micro-bus and two ambulances, and provision of furniture—all funded for the comprehensive development of the facilities.

== See also ==
- Gurudayal Government College
- List of medical colleges in Bangladesh
- Pakundia Adarsha Mohila College
