= Mithamain Upazila =

Mithamoin মিঠামইন
- Upazila
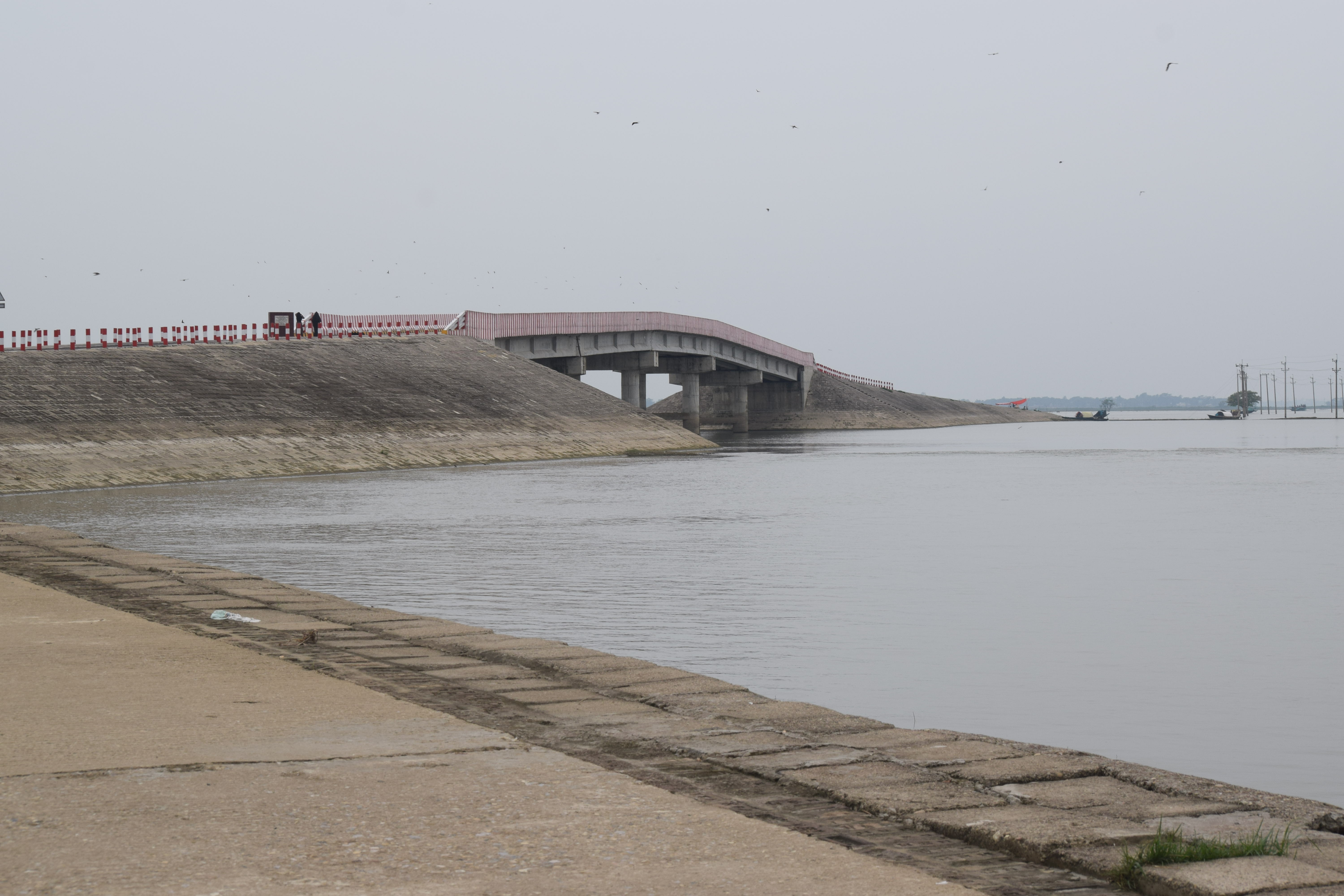
- A bridge in Mithamoin upazila

- Coordinates: 24°25.5′N 91°2.7′E
- Country: Bangladesh
- Division: Dhaka
- District: Kishoreganj
- Upazila: 7 November 1983
- Headquarters: Mithamain

Government
  - Upazila Chairman: Asiya Alam
  - MP (Kishoreganj-4): Rejwan Ahammad Taufiq

Area
  - Total: 222.91 km^{2} (86.07 sq mi)

Population (2022)
  - Total: 125,157
  - Density: 561.47/km^{2} (1,454.2/sq mi)
- Time zone: UTC+6 (BST)
- Postal code: 2370
- Area code: 09435
- Website: mithamoin.kishoreganj.gov.bd

Mithamain Upazila mauza geocode map

Mithamoin (Bengali: মিঠামইন, romanized: Mithamoin) is an upazila (subdistrict) of Kishoreganj District in northern Bangladesh, located in Dhaka Division. It is best known as the home upazila of Abdul Hamid, the former President of Bangladesh.

== Geography ==
Mithamoin is located at 24.4250°N 91.0458°E. Mithamoin has a total land area of 222.91 km^{2}.

== History ==
The area has been inhabited for centuries. The name of Mithamain can be found in James Rennell's 1781 map of Bengal. The upazila was named after the village of Mithamain. Its etymology is rumored to be that at one time there was a large reed forest in the vicinity of the area. The reed was sweet, and the name of the village came to Mithabon (মিঠাবন, sweet forest) which was corrupted to Mithamon and later Mithamain/Mithamoin in the local dialect.

During the Bangladesh War of Independence of 1971, 28 Bengalis were murdered in the village of Dhubajura and 3 in Telikhai on 1 November. Boira was a site of mass killing. On 7 November 1983, Mithamain Thana was upgraded to an upazila.

== Demographics ==
Religions in Mithamain Upazila (2022)
Religion	Percent
Islam	94.05%
Hinduism	5.94%
Other or not stated	0.01%

According to the 2022 Bangladeshi census, Mithamain Upazila had 26,859 households and a population of 125,157. 12.70% of the population were under 5 years of age. Mithamain had a literacy rate (age 7 and over) of 60.52%: 61.96% for males and 59.17% for females, and a sex ratio of 95.96 males for every 100 females. 25,582 (20.44%) lived in urban areas.

According to the 2011 Census of Bangladesh, Mithamain Upazila had 23,850 households and a population of 122,026. 39,236 (32.15%) were under 10 years of age. Mithamain had a literacy rate (age 7 and over) of 30.92%, compared to the national average of 51.8%, and a sex ratio of 974 females per 1000 males. 12,600 (10.33%) lived in urban areas.

As of the 1991 Bangladesh census, Mithamoin's population is 108,204. The population's male to female ratio is 51.79% to 48.21%. 49,034 of Upazila's population is aged 18 or above. Mithamoin has an average literacy rate of 15.6% (7+ years). The literary rate nationally is 32.4%.

== Administration ==
Mithamoin Upazila is divided into Mithamoin Municipality and seven union parishads: Bairati, Dhaki, Ghagra, Gopedighi, Khatkhal, Keorjori, and Mithamain. The union parishads are subdivided into 59 mauzas and 135 villages.

=== Chairmen ===
List of chairmen
Name	Term	Notes
Muhammad Zillur Rahman	25/5/1985-23/11/1991	Advocate
Qamrul Ahsan Shahjahan	1/1/2009-6/3/2014	Advocate
Asiya Alam	Present	

== Infrastructure ==
Land acquisition for a new cantonment was underway by 2016. The Bangladesh Army planned to form a riverine engineer battalion there. Mithamain Cantonment, built on 275 acres of land along the Ghorauta River, was inaugurated in February 2023.

== Notable people ==
- Abdul Hamid, longest serving President of Bangladesh
- Rejwan Ahammad Taufiq, politician

== See also ==
- Upazilas of Bangladesh
- Districts of Bangladesh
- Divisions of Bangladesh
- Administrative geography of Bangladesh
