= Rejwan Ahammad Taufiq =

Bangladeshi politician

- রেজওয়ান আহাম্মদ তৌফিক
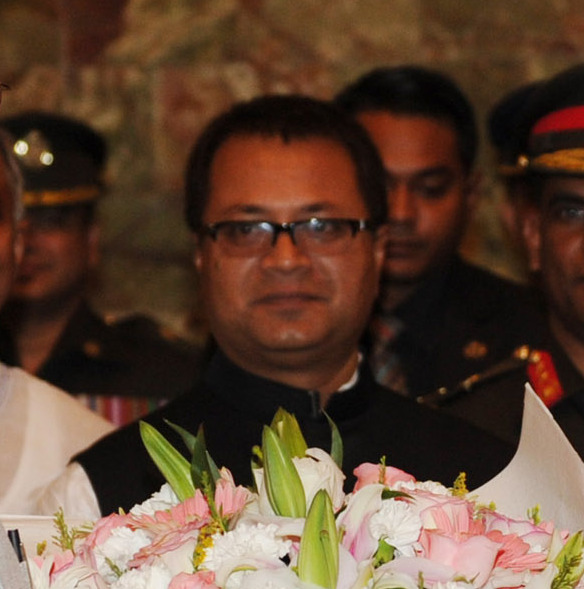
- Taufiq in 2015

Member of Parliament
- In office 8 July 2013 – 6 August 2024
- Preceded by: Abdul Hamid
- Succeeded by: Fazlur Rahman
- Constituency: Kishoreganj-4

Personal details
- Born: 27 October 1969 (age 56) Kishoreganj, East Pakistan, Pakistan
- Party: Bangladesh Awami League
- Parents: Abdul Hamid (father); Rashida Hamid (mother)

Rejwan Ahammad Taufiq (born 27 October 1969) is a Bangladesh Awami League politician and a former Jatiya Sangsad member representing the Kishoreganj-4 constituency.

== Early life ==
Taufiq was born on 27 October 1969. He has a B.S.S. degree. He is the son of former President of Bangladesh Abdul Hamid.

== Career ==
Taufiq was elected to Parliament on 5 January 2014 from Kishoreganj-4 as a Bangladesh Awami League candidate.
