= Kishoreganj-5 =

Constituency of Bangladesh's Jatiya Sangsad

Coordinates: 24.21°N 90.94°E

- Constituency for the Jatiya Sangsad
- District: Kishoreganj District
- Division: Dhaka Division
- Electorate: 278,708 (2018)

Current constituency
- Created: 1984
- Member of Parliament: Sheikh Mujibur Rahman Iqbal
- ← 165 Kishoreganj-4 167 Kishoreganj-6 →

Kishoreganj-5 is a constituency represented in the Jatiya Sangsad (National Parliament) of Bangladesh.

== Boundaries ==
The constituency encompasses Bajitpur and Nikli upazilas.

== History ==
The constituency was created in 1984 from a Mymensingh constituency when the former Mymensingh District was split into four districts: Mymensingh, Sherpur, Netrokona, and Kishoreganj.

== Members of Parliament ==
Election	Member	Party
1986	Mohammad Abdul Hamid	Awami League
1988	Abdul Latif Bhuiyan	Jatiya Party
1991	Mohammad Abdul Hamid	Awami League
Feb 1996	Imdadul Haque	BNP
Jun 1996	Mohammad Abdul Hamid	Awami League
2008	Afzal Hossain	Awami League
2026	Sheikh Mujibur Rahman Iqbal	Independent

== Elections ==
=== Elections in the 2010s ===
Afzal Hossain was re-elected unopposed in the 2014 general election after opposition parties withdrew their candidacies in a boycott of the election.

=== Elections in the 2000s ===
General Election 2008: Kishoreganj-5
Party	Candidate	Votes	%	±%
AL	Afzal Hossain	123,474	64.8	+13.4
BNP	Mojibur Rahman Monju	65,054	34.2	+20.5
BDB	Md. Abdur Rahim	1,732	0.9	N/A
Bangladesh Kalyan Party	Md. Aminul Ahasan	200	0.1	N/A
Majority		58,420	30.7	+14.1
Turnout		190,460	88.5	+16.2
AL hold				

General Election 2001: Kishoreganj-5
Party	Candidate	Votes	%	±%
AL	Mohammad Abdul Hamid	93,915	51.4	+14.4
KSJL	Md. Fazlur Rahman	63,656	34.9	N/A
BNP	Jahir Uddin Bhuiyan	25,064	13.7	−4.9
Majority		30,259	16.6	+15.2
Turnout		182,635	72.3	−3.0
AL hold				

=== Elections in the 1990s ===
General Election June 1996: Kishoreganj-5
Party	Candidate	Votes	%	±%
AL	Mohammad Abdul Hamid	54,073	37.0	−17.9
Independent	Md. Fazlur Rahman	52,024	35.6	N/A
BNP	Emdadul Haque	27,251	18.6	−4.6
JP(E)	Ershad Uddin Ahmed Khan Milki	8,045	5.5	+3.5
Jamaat	Abdus Salam Khan Pathan	2,211	1.5	−2.0
Gano Forum	Borhanuddin Chowdhury	2,100	1.4	N/A
Islamic Sashantantrik Andolan	K. M. Aminul Haque	568	0.4	N/A
Majority		2,049	1.4	−30.3
Turnout		146,272	75.3	+24.0
AL hold				

General Election 1991: Kishoreganj-5
Party	Candidate	Votes	%	±%
AL	Mohammad Abdul Hamid	62,792	54.9	
BNP	Habibur Rahman Bhuiyan	26,540	23.2	
Bangladesh Muslim League (Aian Uddin)	A. H. M. Kamruzzaman Khan	16,205	14.2	
Jamaat	Abdus Salam Khan Pathan	4,058	3.5	
JP(E)	Md. Shafiqul Islam	2,301	2.0	
Zaker Party	Md. Ahmed Karim Mollah	887	0.8	
WPB	Kazi Salah Uddin	520	0.5	
Jatiya Samajtantrik Dal-JSD	Ali Ahmed Milki	451	0.4	
Ganatantri Party	Md. Hasmat Uddin Thakur	338	0.3	
Independent	Golam Rabbani	294	0.3	
Majority		36,252	31.7	
Turnout		114,386	51.3	
AL gain from				
