= Kishoreganj-4 =

Constituency of Bangladesh's Jatiya Sangsad

Coordinates: 24.53°N 91.10°E

- Constituency for the Jatiya Sangsad
- District: Kishoreganj District
- Division: Dhaka Division
- Electorate: 320,246 (2018)

Current constituency
- Created: 1984
- Member of Parliament: Md Fazlur Rahman
- ← 164 Kishoreganj-3 166 Kishoreganj-5 →

Kishoreganj-4 is a constituency represented in the Jatiya Sangsad (National Parliament) of Bangladesh.

== Boundaries ==
The constituency encompasses Austagram, Itna, and Mithamain upazilas.

== History ==
The constituency was created in 1984 from a Mymensingh constituency when the former Mymensingh District was split into four districts: Mymensingh, Sherpur, Netrokona, and Kishoreganj.

== Members of Parliament ==
Election	Member	Party
1986	Mujibul Haque	Jatiya Party
1991	Mizanul Haque	Awami League
Feb 1996	Kabira Uddina Ahmed	BNP
June 1996	Mizanul Haque	Awami League
2001	Osman Faruk	BNP
2008	Mohammad Abdul Hamid	Awami League
2013 by-election	Rejwan Ahmed Toufiq	Awami League
2026	Md Fazlur Rahman	BNP

== Elections ==
=== Elections in the 2010s ===
Rejwan Ahmed Toufiq was re-elected unopposed in the 2014 general election after opposition parties withdrew their candidacies in a boycott of the election.

In April 2013, Abdul Hamid became President of Bangladesh, vacating his parliamentary seat. Rejwan Ahmed Toufiq, his son, stood as an Awami League candidate in the resulting July 2013 by-election, and was elected.

Kishoreganj-4 by-election, 2013
Party	Candidate	Votes	%	±%
AL	Rejwan Ahmed Toufiq	99,933	62.8	+7.6
Independent	Syed Mohitul Islam Asheem	59,224	37.2	N/A
Majority		40,709	25.6	+14.7
Turnout		159,157	57.4	−29.2
AL hold				

=== Elections in the 2000s ===
General Election 2008: Kishoreganj-4
Party	Candidate	Votes	%	±%
AL	Mohammad Abdul Hamid	115,093	55.2	+22.0
BNP	Fazlur Rahman	92,440	44.3	+10.5
Bangladesh Khelafat Majlish	Hedayetulla Hadi	1,025	0.5	N/A
Majority		22,653	10.9	+10.3
Turnout		208,558	86.6	+12.0
AL gain from BNP				

General Election 2001: Kishoreganj-4
Party	Candidate	Votes	%	±%
BNP	Osman Faruk	65,447	33.8	+11.3
AL	Mizanul Haque	64,232	33.2	−4.0
IJOF	Mujibul Haque	62,533	32.3	N/A
KSJL	Fazlur Rahman	686	0.4	N/A
CPB	Enamul Haq	611	0.3	N/A
Jatiya Party (M)	Anowara Khan Chowdhury	162	0.1	N/A
Majority		1,215	0.6	−0.7
Turnout		193,671	74.6	+2.7
BNP gain from AL				

=== Elections in the 1990s ===
General Election June 1996: Kishoreganj-4
Party	Candidate	Votes	%	±%
AL	Mizanul Haque	52,220	37.2	−5.3
JP(E)	Mujibul Haque	50,393	35.9	+19.2
BNP	Kabir Uddin Ahmed	31,588	22.5	−14.4
Jamaat	Md. A. Hai	5,649	4.0	N/A
Independent	Asit Kumar Sarker	256	0.2	N/A
Independent	Md. Jinnatul Islam	208	0.1	N/A
Majority		1,827	1.3	−4.3
Turnout		140,314	71.9	+22.5
AL hold				

General Election 1991: Kishoreganj-4
Party	Candidate	Votes	%	±%
AL	Mizanul Haque	45,608	42.5	
BNP	Kabir Uddin Ahmed	39,554	36.9	
JP(E)	Mujibul Haque	17,952	16.7	
Independent	Asadul Haq	3,262	3.0	
Zaker Party	A. Latif Khandakar	482	0.5	
CPB	Md. Aamirul Islam	446	0.4	
Majority		6,054	5.6	
Turnout		107,304	49.4	
AL hold				
