= Mohammad Abdul Hamid =

President of Bangladesh from 2013 to 2023

Mohammad Abdul Hamid Kawsar
- মোহাম্মদ আবদুল হামিদ
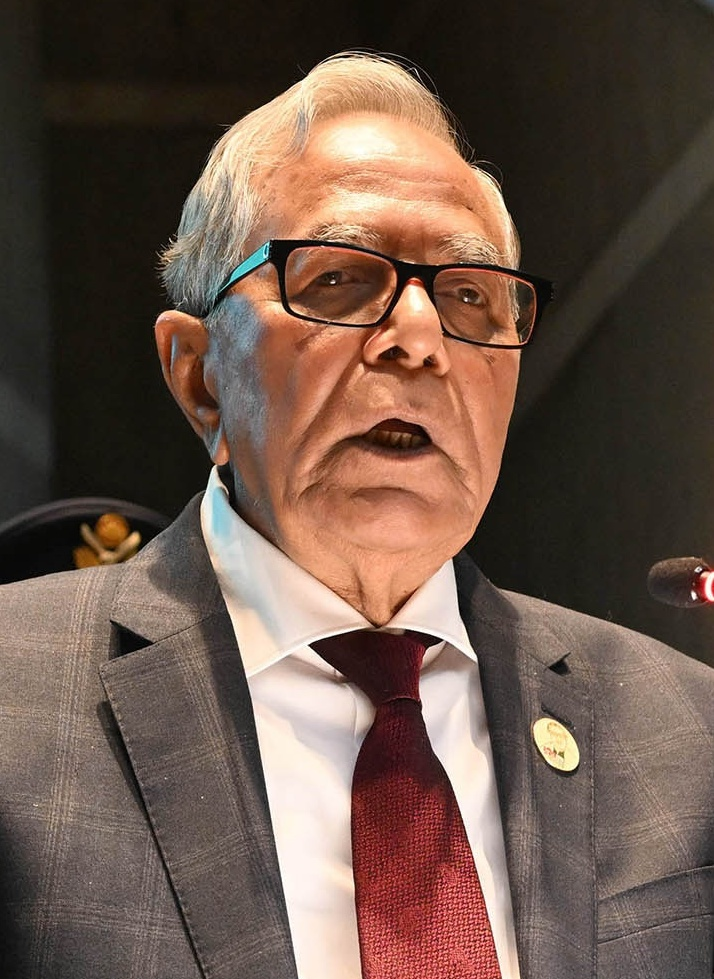
- Hamid in 2023

President of Bangladesh
- In office 14 March 2013 – 24 April 2023
- Prime Minister: Sheikh Hasina
- Preceded by: Zillur Rahman
- Succeeded by: Mohammed Shahabuddin

11th Speaker of the Jatiya Sangsad
- In office 25 January 2009 – 24 April 2013
- Deputy: Shawkat Ali
- Preceded by: Muhammad Jamiruddin Sircar
- Succeeded by: Shawkat Ali (acting)
- In office 12 July 2001 – 28 October 2001
- Deputy: Ali Ashraf
- Preceded by: Humayun Rashid Chowdhury
- Succeeded by: Muhammad Jamiruddin Sircar

8th Deputy Speaker of the Jatiya Sangsad
- In office 14 July 1996 – 10 July 2001
- Speaker: Humayun Rashid Chowdhury
- Preceded by: L. K. Siddiqi
- Succeeded by: Ali Ashraf

Member of Parliament
- In office 25 January 2009 – 24 April 2013
- Preceded by: Osman Faruk
- Succeeded by: Rejwan Ahammad Taufiq
- Constituency: Kishoreganj-4
- In office 14 July 1996 – 27 October 2006
- Preceded by: Imdadul Haque
- Succeeded by: Md. Afzal Hossain
- Constituency: Kishoreganj-5
- In office 5 March 1991 – 24 November 1995
- Preceded by: Abdul Latif Bhuiyan
- Succeeded by: Imdadul Haque
- Constituency: Kishoreganj-5
- In office 7 May 1986 – 3 March 1988
- Succeeded by: Abdul Latif Bhuiyan
- Constituency: Kishoreganj-5

Deputy Leader Of Opposition
- In office 10 October 2001 – 29 October 2006
- Preceded by: Muhammad Jamiruddin Sircar
- Succeeded by: Muhammad Jamiruddin Sircar

Personal details
- Born: 1 January 1944 (age 82) Kamalpur, Bengal, British India
- Party: Bangladesh Awami League
- Spouse: Rashida Hamid (m. 1964)
- Children: 4, including Rejwan
- Education: Gurudayal Government College
- Awards: Independence Award (2013)

Mohammad Abdul Hamid (Note: Bengali: মোহাম্মদ আবদুল হামিদ, romanized: Môhammod Abdul Hamid, Bangla Pronunciation: [ˈmoɦɑmmod ˈabdul ˈɦamid]) (born 1 January 1944) is a Bangladeshi retired politician and lawyer who served as president of Bangladesh from 2013 to 2023, making him the longest-serving president in the country's history. Born in the Haor-prone area of Kishoreganj and a political career spanning more than six decades, he was a lifelong affiliate of the Awami League, and was elected a member of parliament (MP) in Pakistan and independent Bangladesh for seven terms. He previously served as the speaker of the Jatiya Sangsad in 2001 and from 2009 to 2013, deputy speaker from 1996 to 2001, and deputy leader of the opposition from 2001 to 2006.

He is noted for leading a simplistic lifestyle, even during his time in Bangabhaban. He is also known for his witty, humorous approach, with his speeches as president, mainly as chancellor of universities in Bangladesh, becoming widely popular. Some of his remarks, however, were deemed sexist by some. As president, he oversaw the controversial 2014 and 2018 parliamentary elections, and signed many criticised bills and decisions passed by the AL-led parliaments and the Hasina government, and controversially commuted some serious convicts from their sentences. However, he remained comparatively accepted across the political spectrum.

== Early life and education ==
Hamid was born in Kamalpur village, Mithamain Upazila, under Kishoreganj District, to Mohammad Tayebuddin and Tomiza Khatun. He started his early education in the village primary school. After finishing primary education, he went to his relative's house in Bhairabpur and joined Bhairab K.B. Pilot High School for secondary education. Abdul Hamid passed an I.A. and B.A. from Gurudayal Government College in Kishoreganj. He obtained the degree of LL.B. from Central Law College, which is now affiliated with the University of Dhaka. He then joined Kishoreganj Bar as an advocate. He was president of the Kishoreganj District Bar Association five times during 1990–96.

== Political career ==
Hamid joined student politics in the wake of Bengali nationalism against Pakistan via the East Pakistan Chhatra League in 1959. He joined the Awami League (AL) a decade later and was elected as the youngest member of the National Assembly in the 1970 Pakistani general election. After President Yahya Khan postponed the assembly, Hamid spearheaded the March non-cooperation movement in Kishoreganj, and actively participated in and organised the Bangladesh Liberation War. After the independence of Bangladesh, he was elected as an MP in 1973, but was imprisoned after the 15 August coup and the assassination of Sheikh Mujibur Rahman. After his release in 1978, he remained active in AL politics, elected as an MP in 1986, 1991, 1996, 2001, and 2008; and was appointed to various senior posts in the parliament and within the party, mainly by the choice of Sheikh Hasina. As speaker, he served as the acting president during and after the illness and death of Zillur Rahman in 2013. He was then elected unopposed in the 2013 presidential election.

Hamid served as the vice-president of Gurudayal Government College. He was also elected the vice-president of the Chhatra League of the Mymensingh District unit in 1966–67. At the end of 1969, he joined the Awami League. In the 1970 Pakistan general election, Abdul Hamid was elected as the member of parliament for the Mymensingh-18 constituency; he was the youngest person elected. In the general elections of 1973, 1986, 1991, 1996, 2001, and 2009, he was elected as a member of parliament for the Kishoreganj-5 constituency as a nominee of the Awami League. He was the deputy speaker of the National Parliament of Bangladesh when an Awami League government was in office from 1996 to 2001. On 25 January 2009, he became the speaker of parliament. For his contribution to the Bangladesh Liberation War in 1971, he received the Independence Award in 2013.

== Presidency ==
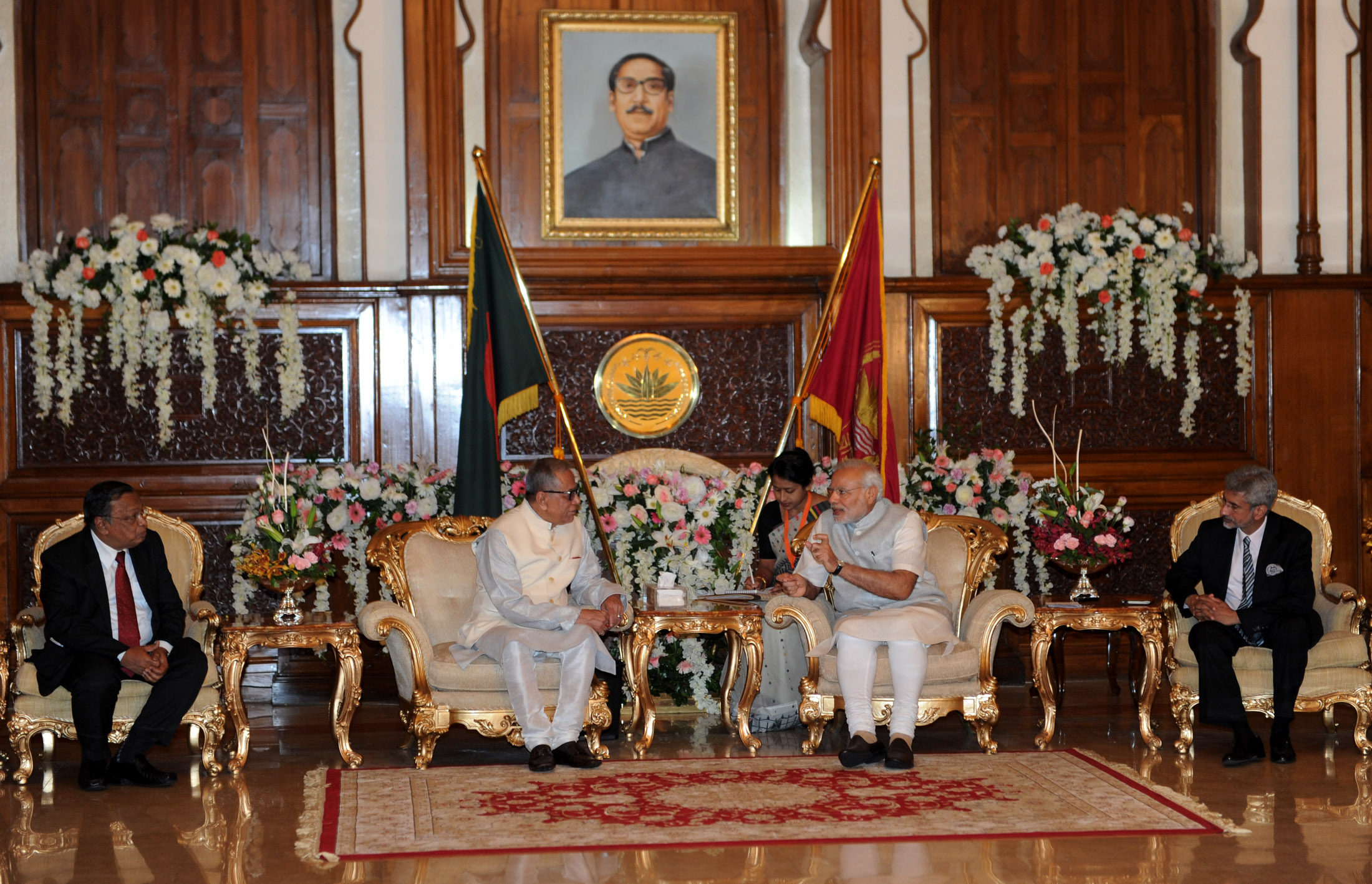
Mohammad Abdul Hamid meeting with Prime Minister Modi at Bangabhaban on 7 June 2015

Hamid was appointed acting president of Bangladesh on 14 March 2013, while President Zillur Rahman was in hospital in Singapore. Zillur Rahman died six days later. Later, Abdul Hamid was elected unopposed as president on 22 April 2013. He was sworn into office on 24 April. He was requested by then opposition leader Khaleda Zia, among others, to resolve the political crisis in 2013, but Hamid expressed his inability due to his constitutional role. He was re-elected in 2018, making him the country's first president to be re-elected. After serving for a total of 10 years and 41 days, his tenure ended in 2023, and he was succeeded by Mohammed Shahabuddin. On his last day of presidency, he told journalists that he will retire from active politics, and taking any more positions would be "humiliating the people of this country"..

Gazette published by Cabinet Division

Hamid suggested that a United Nations-administered humanitarian corridor be established in Myanmar for the Rohingya Muslims.

== Controversies ==
Following the July Revolution in August 2024, he was charged in January 2025 with assaulting protesters, although he was not shown arrested in that case. In February, Abdul Hamid's house was vandalized during the Bulldozer Program.

Abdul Hamid's departure for Thailand on 8 May 2025, officially described as a medical trip, sparked widespread controversy, with critics alleging that he was allowed to leave to avoid facing trial. Media reports claimed that several government figures facilitated his smooth exit through the VIP terminal, prompting public protests and the suspension or dismissal of several officials. Political leaders and student groups demanded accountability, leading to heightened tensions and calls for action against those responsible. He returned to Bangladesh on 9 June 2025 after a month long treatment.

Hamid was often described as a potential new leader for the AL, though it was never confirmed by any side. As part of the cases filed en-masse against AL and previous government affiliates, his name was also included in a murder case. On 8 May 2025, news emerged of his sudden departure to Thailand at midnight "for medical treatment" after months of silence, triggering a large hue and cry from the National Citizen Party (NCP) and other pro-July socio-political platforms. Home Adviser of the interim government Jahangir Alam Chowdhury announced drastic measures, including attempts to issue an Interpol notice for Hamid. Selina Hayat Ivy, former mayor of Narayanganj, who was one of the few AL leaders to stay in their homes after the uprising and was considered to be of "clean image" like Hamid, was arrested despite the protests of hundreds of locals against it. As tensions grew, Adviser Asif Mahmud announced plans to ban AL-affiliated Jubo League and Swechchhasebak League. On the midnight of 9 May, demonstrations demanding a complete ban on AL started in the leadership of NCP in front of Jamuna, the residence of Chief Adviser Muhammad Yunus, and then a blockade of Shahbag, where Jamaat-e-Islami joined the protests in a symbolic retaliation to the 2013 Shahbag movement. On 10 May, the government eventually announced a total ban on all activities of Awami League and all its related organisations, even restricting "expression of support". Hamid eventually returned to Bangladesh a month later, trashing all allegations of fleeing, and the government took a U-turn, not arresting him, saying, "no innocent will should be prosecuted".

== Personal life ==
Hamid has been married to Rashida Hamid since 1964. Together they have three sons and one daughter. His son Rejwan Ahammad Taufiq was an MP from Kishoreganj-4.

Political offices
Preceded by Zillur Rahman	President of Bangladesh; 2013–2023	Succeeded by Mohammed Shahabuddin
Order of precedence
Preceded by Zubayer Rahman Chowdhury as Chief Justice	Order of precedence of Bangladesh as former President	Followed by Mohammed Shahabuddin as former President
