= Shams (name) =

Unisex given name

- Gender: Unisex

Origin
- Origin: Arabic
- Meaning: Shams is an Arabic surname, meaning 'sun'. It is most common in the Muslim World.
- Region of origin: Middle East

Other names
- Related names: Shams ul Alam; Shams ud Duha; Shams al-Din; Shams ul Haq; Shamsul Huda; Shamsul Islam; Shamsunnahar; Shamsur Rahman; Shamsuzzaman

Shams (Persian: شمس, Arabic: شمس) is an Arabic origin word which is used as a unisex given name and a surname. Notable people with the name include:

== Given name ==
=== Female ===
- Shams (singer) (born 1980), a Saudi-Kuwaiti singer
- Shams Abbasi (1924–2011), Pakistani scholar
- Shams Aghahuseynova (born 2010), Azerbaijani rhythmic gymnast
- Shams al-Baroudi (born 1945), Egyptian actress
- Shams C. Inati, American scholar
- Shams un Nisa Memon, Pakistani politician
- Shams ol-Moluk Mosahab (1913–1997), Iranian educator and politician
- Shams Pahlavi (1917–1996), member of the Iranian royal family

=== Male ===
- Shams Aalam (born 1986), Indian para swimmer
- Shams Badran (1929–2020), Egyptian military officer
- Shams Buneri (1946–2023), Pakistani poet
- Shams Chak, Kashmiri Commander from the Chak dynasty
- Shams Charania (born 1994), American television presenter
- Shams Chowdhury (born 1966), Bangladeshi army general
- Shams al-Dawla (died 1021), Buyid ruler of Hamadan
- Shams al-Muluk Duqaq (died 1104), Seljuq ruler of Damascus
- Shams-i Fakhri, Iranian lexicographer and philologist
- Shams al-Mulk Isma'il (1113–1135), Seljuk ruler of the Emirate of Damascus
- Shams-i-Jahan (died 1408), Khan of Mughlistan
- Shams Langeroodi (born 1950), Iranian poet
- Shams al-Muluk Muhammad (died 1317), Baduspanid ruler of Rustamdar
- Shams Mulani (born 1997), Indian cricketer
- Shams al-Mulk Nasr (died 1080), Karakhanid ruler in Transoxiana
- Shams Ali Qalandar (1874–1966), Pakistani Sufi faqir and qalandar
- Shams Rahman, Bangladeshi academic
- Shams Sumon (1967–2026), Bangladeshi actor
- Shams Tabraiz (missionary) (died 1356), Indian Ismaili saint
- Shams Tabrizi (1185–1248), Iranian Sufi mystic
- Shams Naved Usmani (1931–1993), Indian Muslim scholar
- Shams ibn Uthman (594–625), companion of the Islamic prophet Muhammad

== Surname ==
- Ajmal Shams (born 1972), Afghan politician and engineer
- Fatemeh Shams (born 1983), Iranian poet and literary scholar
- Hossein Shams (born 1961), Iranian futsal coach and football player
- Ibrahim Shams (1917–2001), Egyptian Olympic weightlifter
- Kalimuddin Shams (1939–2013), Indian politician
- Ladan Shams, American psychologist
- Mohammad Shams (born 1954), Iranian musical artist
- Noorena Shams (born 1997), Pakistani sportsperson
- Randy J. Shams, American musical artist
- Siavash Shams (born 1963), Iranian musical artist
- Sumera Shams (born 1991), Pakistani politician
- Wahid Shams Kolahi (born 1965), Iranian German engineer

== Arabic-based compound names with Shams as an element ==
- Shamsul Alam, meaning Sun of the world
- Shams al-Din, meaning Sun of the religion/faith
- Shams ul Huda, meaning Sun of the guidance
- Shams ul Haq, meaning Sun of Al Haqq
- Shamsul Islam, meaning Sun of Islam
- Shamsuzzaman, meaning Sun of the era
- Shams ud Duha, meaning Sun of the dawn
- Shamsunnahar, meaning Sun of the morning
- Shamsur Rahman, meaning Sun of the Most Merciful
- Shamsi (name), meaning Sunny
