= Stoning in Islam =

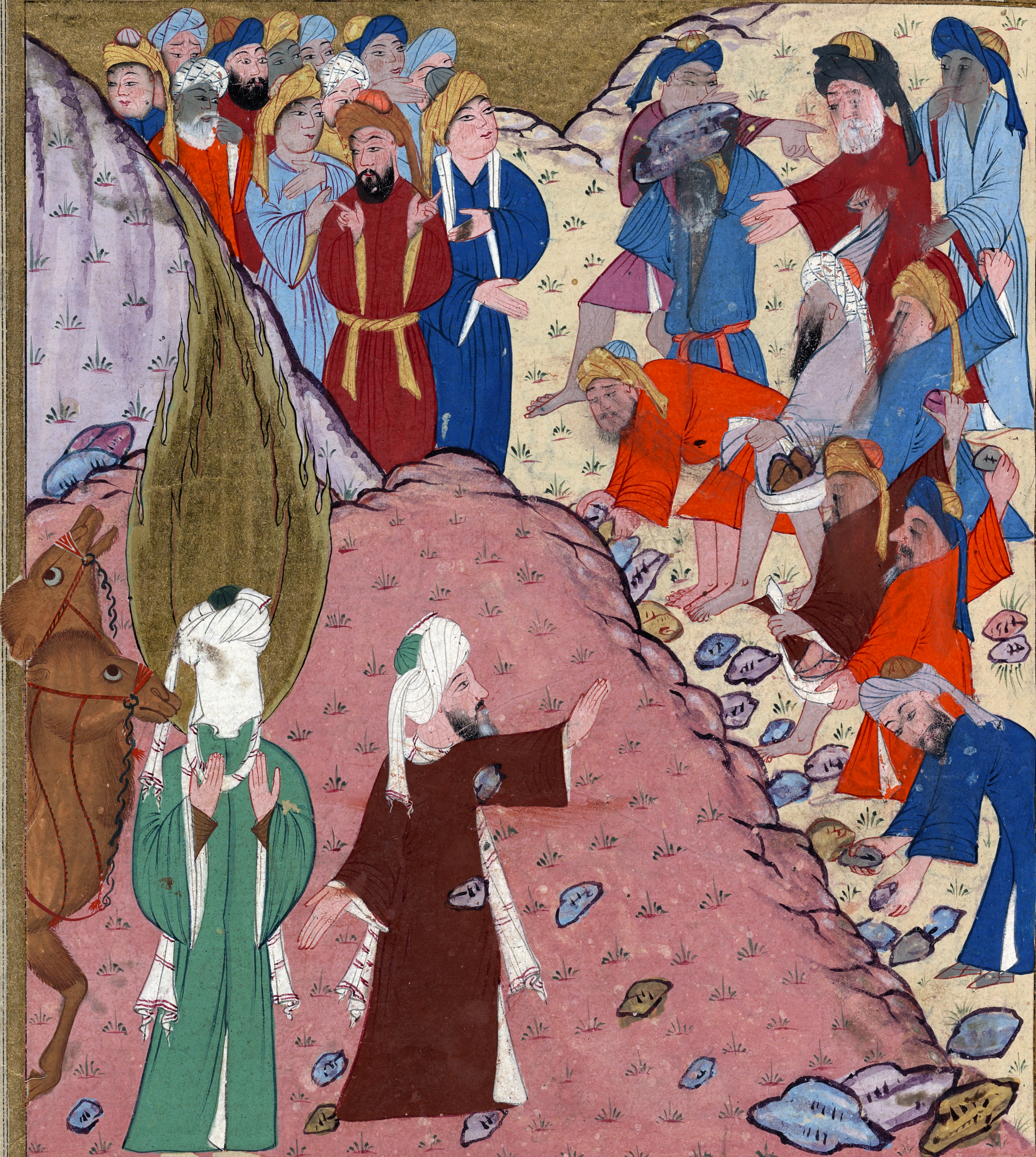
Islamic miniature depicting Meccan Mobs led by Abu Lahab trying to stone Muhammad and Abu Bakr at the Souk of Okaz

A map showing countries where public stoning is a judicial or extrajudicial form of punishment, as of 2013.

In Islam, stoning (Arabic: رجم, romanized: rajm) is the Hudud punishment wherein an organized group throws stones at a convicted individual until that person dies. Under some versions of Islamic law (Sharia), it is the prescribed punishment in cases of Zina committed by a married person which requires either a confession from either the adulterer or adulteress, or producing four witnesses of sexual penetration.

The punishment of stoning as a capital punishment for adultery is unique in Islamic law in that it conflicts with the Qur'anic prescription for premarital and extramarital sex (zina) found in Surah An-Nur, 2: "The woman and the man guilty of adultery or fornication - flog each of them with a hundred stripes". For this reason some minority Muslim sects such as the former Kharijites, and Islamic modernists such as the Quranists disagree with the legality of stoning.

However, stoning is mentioned in multiple hadiths (reports claiming to quote what Muhammad said verbatim on various matters, which most Muslims and Islamic scholars consider an authoritative source second only to Quran as a source of religious law and rulings), and therefore most schools of Islamic jurisprudence accept it as a prescribed punishment for adultery. The punishment has been rarely applied in the history of Islam owing to the very strict evidential requirements stipulated by Islamic law.

== Practice ==
Legal imposition of the stoning punishment was very rare in Islamic history. During the 623-year history of the Ottoman Empire, for which there are voluminous court records, there is only one recorded example of a judge sentencing a convict to death by stoning, and the ruling contravened Islamic law on at least two grounds (sufficient evidence was not produced, and a Jewish man was sentenced to death despite the law stating clearly that the death penalty for illegal sex should only be applied to Muslims). No sentences of stoning have been recorded in Syria during Muslim rule. In Ottoman Istanbul, only one instance of stoning ever took place, according to Ottoman records. Muslim jurists used a number of techniques to avoid application of the stoning penalty. They interpreted the evidentiary requirements so strictly that it was effectively impossible to prove the offense. They actively encouraged witnesses to withhold testimony, and argued that it was morally better to do so. They defined the offense narrowly to exclude many types of sexual activity. And they developed the legal concept of shubha (doubt), which held that when an illegal sexual act resembled legal sex in some way, the stoning penalty should not be applied. Techniques used to argue that the pregnancy of a single woman should not be considered evidence of zināʿ included fantastic presumptions about the length of the human gestation period. Classical Hanafite jurists ruled that it could last for up to two years, Shafi'ites four, and Malikites as long as five years.

According to journalist Max Rodenbeck,

In almost all cases where it has been applied in recent years, stoning has taken place in tribal or rebel areas beyond the control of central governments—the Taliban in Afghanistan, ISIS in Iraq, and Boko Haram in Nigeria being cases in point. Out of the world’s forty-nine Muslim-majority states, six retain the punishment in deference to Islamic legal tradition, ... Of these countries only Iran, which officially placed a moratorium on stoning in 2002 but still gives leeway to individual judges, has actually carried it out.

Saudi Arabia sentenced four people by stoning between the 1980 and 1992. As of 2005, stoning punishments have been considered or handed down in Nigeria and Somalia for the crimes of adultery and sodomy (homosexuality). Since the Sharia legal system was introduced in northern Nigeria in 2000, more than a dozen Muslims have been sentenced to death by stoning. In one case, an appellate court in the state of Sokoto overturned a stoning sentence on the basis that divorced defendant might not have conceived her child in zina (fornication) because she may have been carrying her baby for as long as five years. Another Nigerian state court of appeal assessed the upper limit of gestation at seven years.

In Pakistan "more than three decades of official Islamization have so far failed to produce a single actual stoning..." Iran officially placed a moratorium on stoning in 2002 but still gives leeway to individual judges to sentence stoning. Sentences of stoning have generated heavy backlash by human rights groups, which consider stoning a form of execution by torture.

From July 2014 to February 2015, at least 16 people of whom nine were executed (not all by rajm) by Islamic State of Iraq and the Levant (ISIL) in Syria for the crimes of adultery or homosexuality, according to the Syrian Observatory for Human Rights.

== Scriptural basis ==
=== Quran ===
Stoning is not mentioned as a form of capital punishment in the canonical text of the Quran.

=== Hadith ===
Numerous Sahih hadiths describe stoning. According to Sunni scholars, sahih hadiths are reliable. The early Islamic text Musannaf of Abd al-Razzaq, in the chapter on Rajm, lists 70 hadith reports of stoning linked to Muhammad, and 100 to his companions and other authorities.

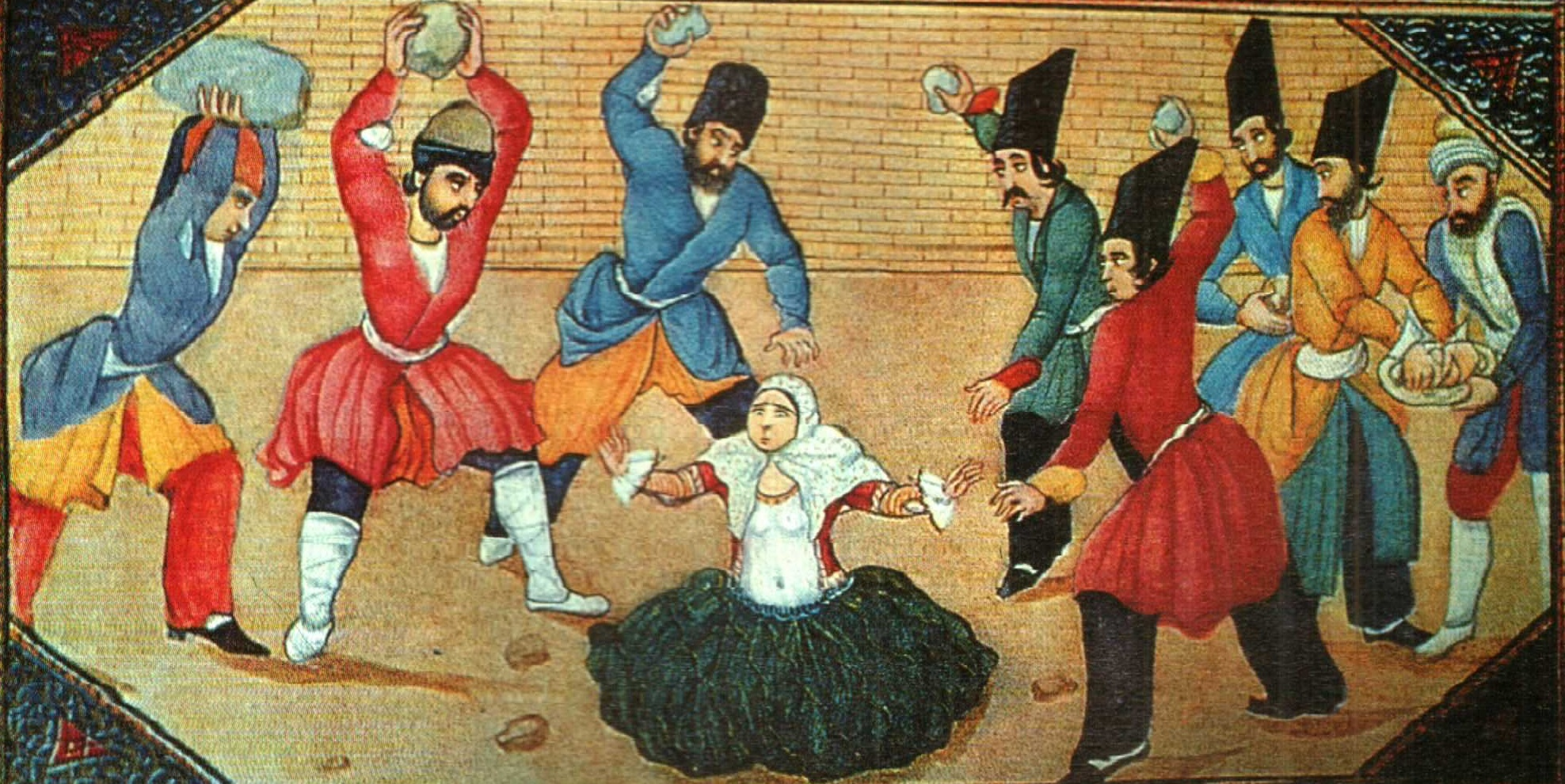
The Stoning of an Adulteress, illustration to a manuscript of 1001 Nights by Abu'l Hasan Ghaffari or his atelier. Tehran, 1853–1857.

The hadith Sahih Bukhari, the book most trusted after Quran by most Muslims, has several sunnah regarding stoning. For example,

Narrated Ibn 'Abbas: 'Umar said, "I am afraid that after a long time has passed, people may say, "We do not find the Verses of the Rajam (stoning to death) in the Holy Book," and consequently they may go astray by leaving an obligation that Allah has revealed. Lo! I confirm that the penalty of Rajam be inflicted on him who commits illegal sexual intercourse, if he is already married and the crime is proved by witnesses or pregnancy or confession." Sufyan added, "I have memorized this narration in this way." 'Umar added, "Surely Allah's Apostle carried out the penalty of Rajam, and so did we after him."

— Sahih al-Bukhari, 8:82:816 see also Sahih Muslim, 17:4194

Narrated Abu Huraira: A man from Bani Aslam came to Allah's Apostle while he was in the mosque and called (the Prophet) saying, "O Allah's Apostle! I have committed illegal sexual intercourse." On that the Prophet turned his face from him to the other side, whereupon the man moved to the side towards which the Prophet had turned his face, and said, "O Allah's Apostle! I have committed illegal sexual intercourse." The Prophet turned his face (from him) to the other side whereupon the man moved to the side towards which the Prophet had turned his face, and repeated his statement. The Prophet turned his face (from him) to the other side again. The man moved again (and repeated his statement) for the fourth time. So when the man had given witness four times against himself, the Prophet called him and said, "Are you insane?" He replied, "No." The Prophet then said (to his companions), "Go and stone him to death." The man was a married one. Jabir bin 'Abdullah Al-Ansari said: I was one of those who stoned him. We stoned him at the Musalla ('Id praying place) in Medina. When the stones hit him with their sharp edges, he fled, but we caught him at Al-Harra and stoned him till he died.

— Sahih al-Bukhari, 7:63:196

See also other hadiths from Sahih Bukhari: Sahih al-Bukhari, 2:23:413 Sahih al-Bukhari, 3:34:421 Sahih al-Bukhari, 3:49:860 Sahih al-Bukhari, 3:50:885 Sahih al-Bukhari, 4:56:829 Sahih al-Bukhari, 6:60:79 Sahih al-Bukhari, 7:63:195.

Narrated Ash Shaibani:

I asked `Abdullah bin Abi `Aufa, 'Did Allah's Messenger (SAWS) carry out the Rajam penalty ( i.e., stoning to death)?' He said, "Yes." I said, "Before the revelation of Surat-an-Nur or after it?" He replied, "I don't Know."

Bukhari Book 86 hadith 42.

Sahih Muslim Book 17 has several hadith regarding Stoning specifically (17:4191-4209, and 17:4914). For example,

Abu Huraira reported that a person from amongst the Muslims came to Allah's Messenger while he was in the mosque. He called him saying: Allah's Messenger. I have committed adultery. He (the Holy Prophet) turned away from him, He (again) came round facing him and said to him: Allah's Messenger, I have committed adultery. He (the Holy Prophet) turned away until he did that four times, and as he testified four times against his own self, Allah's Messenger called him and said: Are you mad? He said: No. He (again) said: Are you married? He said: Yes. Thereupon Allah's Messenger said: Take him and stone him. Ibn Shihab (one of the narrators) said: One who had heard Jabir b. 'Abdullah saying this informed me thus: I was one of those who stoned him. We stoned him at the place of prayer (either that of 'Id or a funeral). When the stones hurt him, he ran away. We caught him in the Harra and stoned him (to death). This hadith has been narrated through another chain of transmitters.

— Sahih Muslim, 17:4196

See also other hadiths from the Sahih Muslim book: Sahih Muslim, 17:4191, 17:4198, 17:4199.

Other hadiths also mention stoning as the punishment for adultery.

Narrated Jabir ibn Abdullah: A man committed fornication with a woman. So the Apostle of Allah ordered regarding him and the prescribed punishment of flogging was inflicted on him. He was then informed that he was married. So he commanded regarding him and he was stoned to death.

— Sunan Abu Dawood, 38:4424

See also other hadiths from the Abu Dawud book: Sunan Abu Dawood, 38:4421, 38:4426, 38:4429, 38:4433.

== In jurisprudence (fiqh) ==
Rajm, sometimes spelled as Rajam, has been extensively discussed in the texts of early, medieval and modern era Islamic jurisprudence (fiqhs).

Persons who accuse a woman of adultery but are not able to bring four witnesses—a crime known as Qadhf, القذف—are liable to a punishment of 80 lashes and to be unacceptable as witnesses unless they repent and reform. The testimony of a man who accuses his own spouse without any other witnesses may be accepted if they swear by God four times that they are telling the truth with a fifth oath to incur God's condemnation if they be lying. In this case, if his spouse counterswears, no punishment will be enforced.

One of the widely followed Islamic legal commentaries, Al-Muwatta by Malik ibn Anas, state that contested pregnancy is sufficient proof of adultery and the woman must be stoned to death.

=== Hanafi ===
Hanafi jurists have held that the accused must be a muhsan at the time of religiously disallowed sex to be punished by Rajm (stoning). A Muhsan is an adult, free, Muslim who has previously enjoyed legitimate sexual relations in matrimony, regardless of whether the marriage still exists. In other words, stoning does not apply to someone who was never married in his or her life (only lashing in public is the mandatory punishment in such cases).

For evidence, Hanafi fiqh accepts the following: self-confession, or testimony of four male witnesses (female witnesses are not acceptable). Hanafi Islamic law literature specifies two types of stoning. One, when the punishment is based on bayyina, or concrete evidence (four male witnesses). In this case the person is bound, a pit dug, the bound person placed and partially buried inside the pit so that he or she may not escape, thereafter the public stoning punishment is executed. A woman sentenced to stoning must be partially buried up to her chest. The first stones are thrown by the witnesses and the accuser, thereafter the Muslim community present, stated Abū Ḥanīfa and other Hanafi scholars. In second type of stoning, when the punishment is based on self-confession, the stoning is to be performed without digging a pit or partially burying the person. In this case, the qadi (judge) should throw the first stone before other Muslims join in. Further, if the person flees, the person is allowed to leave.

Hanafi scholars specify the stone size to be used for stoning, to be the size of one's hand. It should not be too large to cause death too quickly, nor too small to extend only pain.

Hanafites have traditionally held that the witnesses should throw the first stones in case the conviction was brought about by witnesses, and the qadi must throw the first stones in case the conviction was brought about by a confession.

=== Shafi'i ===
The Shafii school literature has the same Islamic law analysis as the Hanafi. However, it recommends, that the first stone be thrown by the Imam or his deputy in all cases, followed by the Muslim community witnessing the stoning punishment.

=== Hanbali ===
Hanbali jurist Ibn Qudama states, "Muslim jurists are unanimous on the fact that stoning to death is a specified punishment for the married adulterer and adulteress. The punishment is recorded in number of traditions and the practice of Muhammad stands as an authentic source supporting it. This is the view held by all Companions, Successors and other Muslim scholars with the exception of Kharijites."

Hanbali Islamic law sentences all forms of consensual but religiously illegal sex as punishable with stoning. However, Hanbali scholars insist that homosexuality among men must be punished by beheading, instead of stoning as recommended by the Maliki madhab of Islam.

=== Maliki ===
Maliki school of jurisprudence (fiqh) holds that stoning is the required punishment for illegal sex by a married or widowed person, as well as for any form of homosexual relations among men. Malik ibn Anas, founded of Maliki fiqh, considered pregnancy in an unmarried woman as a conclusive proof of zina. He also stated that contested pregnancy is also sufficient proof of adultery and any Muslim woman who is pregnant by a man who she is not married to, at the time of getting pregnant, must be stoned to death. Later Maliki Muslim scholars admitted the concept of "sleeping embryo", where a divorced woman could escape the stoning punishment, if she remained unmarried and became pregnant anytime within five years of her divorce, and it was assumed that she was impregnated by her previous husband but the embryo remained dormant for five years.

=== Others ===
All Sunni schools of fiqh, as well as Volume 7 of the Shi'ite hadith, The Book of Legal Penalties in Kitab al-Kafi, declare stoning as the required punishment for sex that is not allowed under Sharia.

In contrast to Sunni schools, Shia fiqh, in Rajm cases, allows some of the witnesses to be women but considers the witness of a woman as half as valid as a man's. Thus, before an accused is sentenced to stoning in the Shia system, the witnesses may be four men, three men and two women, two men and four women, one man and six women, but witnesses must include at least one man. Furthermore, Shi'i jurists grant discretionary powers to the judge in cases of homosexuality, to sentence the accused to death by sword, stoning, death by throwing from a high wall, or burning the accused to death.

== Views ==
There is disagreement among modern Islamic thinkers as to the applicability of stoning for adultery. While religious texts often give examples both with and without stoning, the Quran does not prescribe stoning as a punishment for any crime, mentioning only lashing as punishment for adultery. However most scholars maintain that there is sufficient evidence from hadiths to derive a ruling. The vast majority of Muslims consider hadiths, which describe the words, conduct and example set by Muhammad during his life, as a source of law and religious authority second only to the Quran. They consider sahih hadiths to be a valid source of Sharia, justifying their belief on Quranic verse 33.21, and other verses.

The reliability of Hadith is disputed by Quranist Muslims who reject all hadith, and as a consequence the stoning punishment as well.

Syed Abdullah Tariq argues that stoning is not the punishment of the fornication, as generally been understood, and it is not among the Hudood either. His book Haqiqat-i Rajm was widely criticized by the ulama as he had tried to clear doubts against the punishments prescribed by Islam for different crimes. The Islamic modernist Javed Ahmad Ghamidi postulates that Quranic verses prescribe stoning only for those who habitually commit fornication as prostitutes do, which then constitute "mischief in the land" that is punishable by death according to Quranic verses 5:33-34. This view is not popular and does not enjoy acceptance by most ulema.

== See also ==
- Repentance in Islam
- Sharia
- Hirabah
- Stoning
- Stoning of the Devil
- The Stoning of Soraya M. (Soraya Manutchehri)

== Sources ==
- Kadri, Sadakat (2012). Heaven on Earth: A Journey Through Shari'a Law from the Deserts of Ancient Arabia to the Streets of the Modern Muslim World. Macmillan. ISBN 9780099523277.
