= Shams ul Haq =

Shams ul Haq (transliterations vary), an Arabic phrase meaning "Sun of the Truth", is a male Muslim given name. Notable bearers of the name include;

- Muhammad Shams-ul-Haq Azimabadi (1857–1911), Indian Hadith scholar
- Shamsul Haque Faridpuri (1896–1969), Bengali Islamic scholar and founder of Jamia Qurania Arabia Lalbagh
- Shamsul Haq Afghani (1901–1983), president of Wifaq ul Madaris Al-Arabia, Pakistan
- Muhammad Shamsul Huq (1912–2006), Bangladeshi Minister of Foreign Affairs
- Shamsul Huq (1918–1965), inaugural general-secretary of the Awami League
- Shamsul Haq (1927–1998), Bangladeshi minister
- Syed Shamsul Haque (1935–2016), Bangladeshi author
- AKM Samsul Haque Khan (died 1971), civil servant
- Shamsul Haque Chowdhury (Rangpur politician) (1936–2008), freedom fighter and parliamentarian
- Shamsul Hoque Tuku (born 1948), deputy speaker of the Jatiya Sangsad
- Mohammed Shamsul Hoque Bhuiyan (born 1948), former Member of Parliament of Chandpur-4
- Shamsul Hoque, Meghalaya politician
- Shamsul Haque Chowdhury (born 1957), MP for Chittagong-12 and general secretary of Chittagong Abahani
- Shamsul Haq Lone (born 1976), member of the Gilgit-Baltistan Assembly
- Shamsul Haque (general), Bangladesh Army general
- Shamsul Haque (Chandpur politician), former Member of Parliament of Chandpur-2
- Shamsul Haque Dhakawi, former Member of Parliament of Dhaka-11
- Shamsul Haque (Satkhira politician), author, lawyer and parliamentarian
- Shamsul Haque (Mymensingh politician), former Member of Parliament for Mymensingh-10
- Shamsul Haque Talukder, former Member of Parliament for Tangail-2
- M. Shamshul Haque, 19th vice-chancellor of the University of Dhaka
- Md. Shamsul Haque, former Member of Parliament for Mymensingh-2
- Mohammad Shamsul Haque, Bengali police officer
- Mohammad Shamsul Haque (Dhaka politician), politician
- Shams Ul Haq (journalist), German-Pakistani journalist and author

== See also ==
- Shams ud Duha (disambiguation)
