= Early Muslims =

List of early converts to the religion of Islam

From 613 to 619 CE, the Islamic prophet Muhammad gathered in his hometown of Mecca a small following of those who embraced his message of Islam and thus became Muslims. The first person who professed Islam was his wife, Khadija. The identity of the first male Muslim, after Muhammad himself, is disputed between the Shia and Sunni branches. Shia and some Sunni sources identify Ali as the first male Muslim, Muhammad's cousin and son-in-law, who was a child at the time. Other sources report that the first male Muslim was Abu Bakr, Muhammad's father-in-law, or Muhammad's foster son, Zayd ibn Haritha. While it is difficult to establish the chronological order, the identities of early Muslims are known with some certainty.

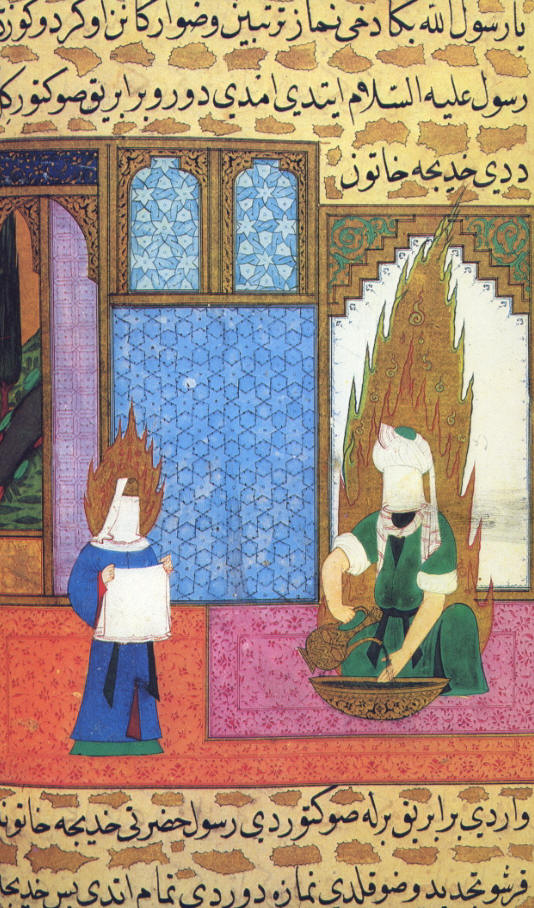
Depiction of Muhammad and his wife Khadija performing the first ritual ablution wudu, from the Siyer-i Nebi

== First female Muslim ==
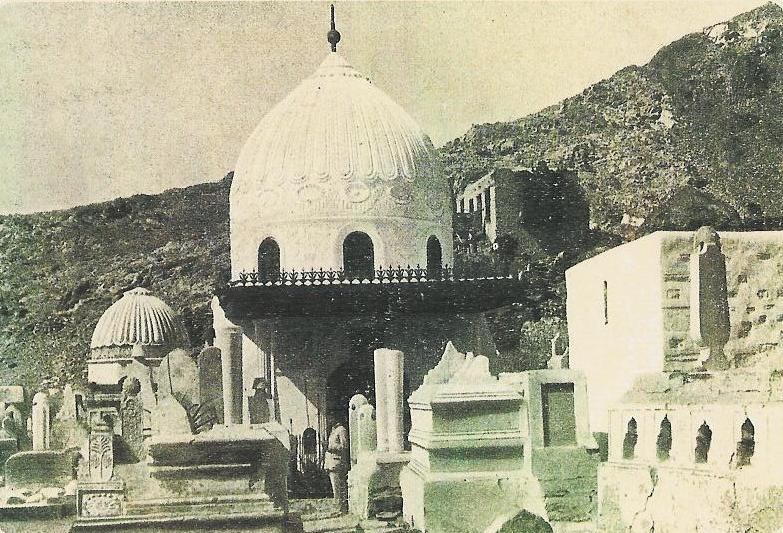
The mausoleum of Khadija in Mecca, before its demolition by the House of Saud in the 1920s

Muhammad first claimed to have received his first revelations around 610 CE, which he initially shared only with his wife, Khadija bint Khuwaylid. Over time, in his hometown of Mecca, Muhammad gathered a small following of those who embraced his message of Islam (lit. 'submission' to God) and became Muslims. This increasingly drew the ire of the Meccan elite, who persecuted the early converts, especially the slaves and social outcasts. While Khadija is universally recognized as the first female convert to Islam, the identity of the second male Muslim, after Muhammad himself, is disputed.

== Second male Muslim ==
An ongoing dispute concerns the identity of the second male Muslim, that is, the first male who accepted the teachings of Muhammad. Shia and some Sunni sources identify him as Muhammad's cousin, Ali ibn Abi Talib, aged between nine and eleven at the time. For instance, this is reported by the Sunni historian Ibn Hisham (d. 833) in his recension of al-Sira al-Nabawiya, the biographical work of the Shia-leaning historian Ibn Ishaq (d. 767). Similar reports appear in the works of the Sunni authors Ibn Sa'd (d. 845) and al-Suyuti (d. 1505). Ali himself claimed to be the second male Muslim in al-Qasi'a, a sermon attributed to him in Nahj al-Balagha. Among contemporary authors, this is also the view of Hassan Abbas, John Esposito, Clément Huart, Betty Kelen, John McHugo, Moojan Momen, Hossein Nasr and Asma Afsaruddin, and Reza Shah-Kazemi, while W. Montgomery Watt (d. 2006) regards the aforementioned list of early Muslims in al-Sira al-Nabawiya as "roughly accurate."

Other Sunni sources specify the first male convert to Islam to be either the first Sunni caliph, Abu Bakr, or else Muhammad's foster son, Zayd ibn Haritha. In particular, the Sunni historian al-Tabari (d. 923) lists several contradictory Sunni traditions as to the relative priority of Ali, Abu Bakr, and Zayd, but—himself refraining from judgment on the matter—leaves the reader to decide which of the narratives is to be preferred. The earliest extant records seem to place Ali before Abu Bakr, according to the Islamicist Robert Gleave; nevertheless, the Sunni–Shia disagreement over this matter has an obvious polemical dimension, and Abu Bakr's later high status might have been reflected back into the early Islamic records.

Sunni sources often describe Ali as the first child to embrace Islam, though the significance of his conversion has been questioned by Watt and by Sunni historian al-Jahiz (d. 869). Alternatively, the Shia jurist Ibn Shahrashub (d. 1192) counters that Ali's youth—far from impeding his ability to grasp the message of Muhammad—in fact only increases his merit in so doing; Shahrashub further argues that Jesus and John the Baptist were similarly bestowed with divine wisdom in childhood, according to the Quran. In Shia sources, Ali is credited not only as being the first male convert, but also with—since he had been raised by Muhammad from a young age—having never practiced idolatry. This places him—in Shi'ism—above Abu Bakr, who was a middle-aged man at the time of his conversion.

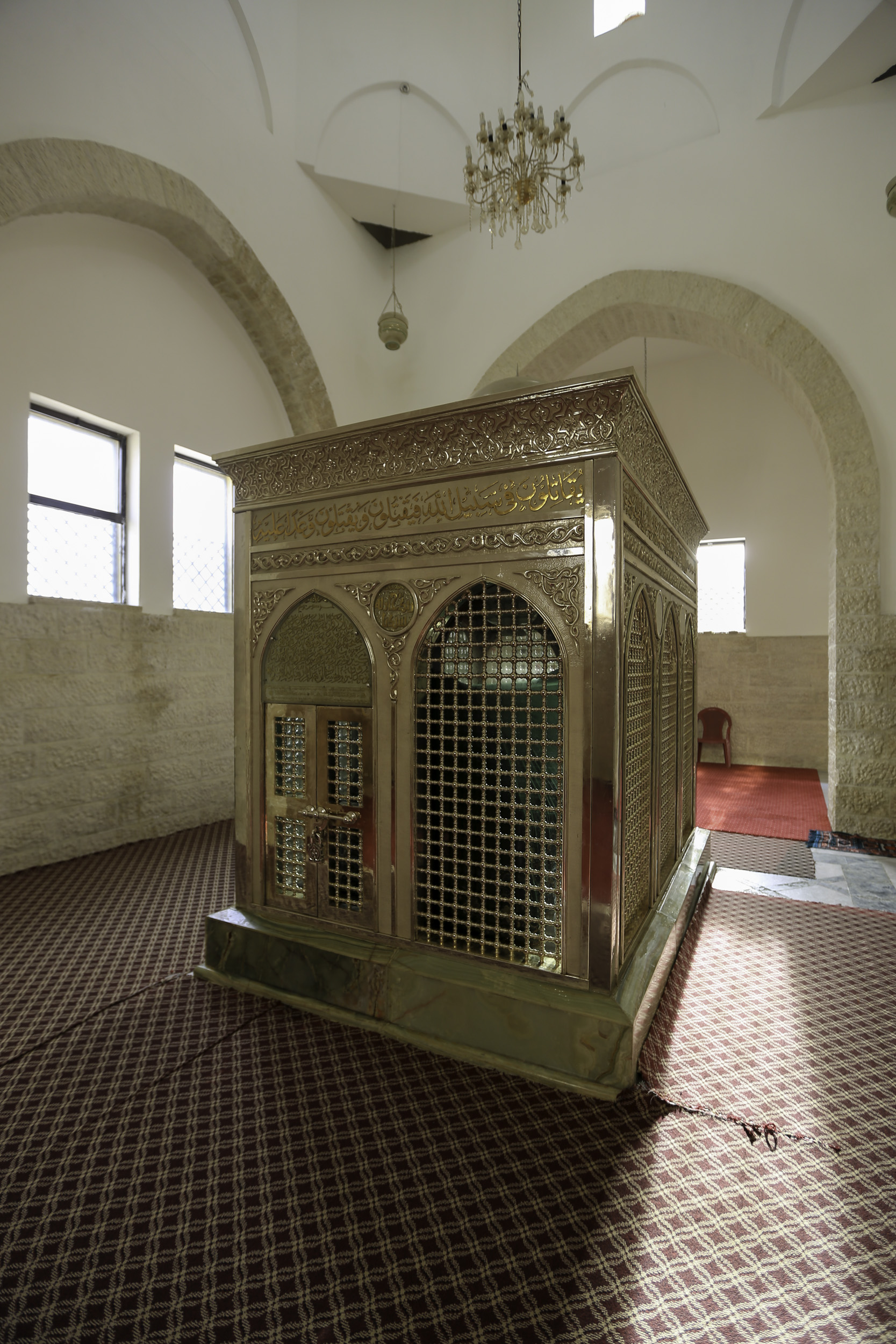
The shrine of Zayd ibn Haritha—foster son of Muhammad and an early Muslim—located in present-day Jordan

== Other early Muslims ==
Since social status in Islam depended on Islamic precedence, historical reports about the order in which his followers joined Muhammad are often not reliable. Nevertheless, an approximate list of early Muslims may be compiled with reasonable certainty, and one such list is given by Ibn Ishaq. Many of them were young and middle-class men, surmises Watt, some of whom did not enjoy any clan protection and were thus susceptible to harassment by Meccan pagans.

Among the Banu Hashim, Muhammad's clan, Ja'far ibn Abi Talib and Hamza ibn Abd al-Muttalib were two early Muslims. Ubyda ibn al-Harith, some years senior to Muhammad, was another relative of him who embraced Islam early on. Besides Abu Bakr, a young Talha ibn Ubayd Allah was another early convert from the Banu Taym clan in Mecca. Among the Banu Zuhra, another Meccan clan, Abd al-Rahman ibn Awf, Sa'd ibn Abi Waqqas and his brothers, Abd Allah ibn Mas'ud, al-Muttalib ibn Azhar and his brother, and Khabbab ibn al-Aratt were all early Muslims, though the last figure was a poor confederate with little protection, and probably suffered persecution in Mecca. Miqdad ibn Aswad and Mas'ud bin Rabi'a, both early Muslims, were two other confederates of this clan. The early converts among the Meccan Banu Adi clan included Sa'id ibn Zayd, Nu'aym ibn Abd Allah, and Umar ibn al-Khattab, who later succeeded Abu Bakr to the caliphate. Abu Ubayda ibn al-Jarrah and Suhayl ibn Bayda' became Muslims from among the ranks of the Banu al-Harith, another Meccan clan. Early Muslims from the Meccan clan of Banu Amir included Ibn Umm Makhtum, Suhayl ibn Amr, and his brothers. Zubayr ibn al-Awwam is perhaps the only named early convert from the Banu Asad, another Meccan clan. Among the influential Abd Shams clan in Mecca, Uthman ibn Affan, Abu Hudhayfa ibn Utba, Khalid ibn Sa'id, and the family of the confederate Jahsh professed Islam early on. The Banu Makhzum, evidently the politically dominant clan in Mecca, also had some early Muslims, including Abu Salama, al-Arqam, Shams ibn Uthman, and the confederate Ammar ibn Yasir. Khunays ibn Hudhafa is the only named early convert from the Banu Sahm, another Meccan clan. Among the Banu Juma, Uthman ibn Maz'un and some of his close relatives are listed among the early converts.

== See also ==
- Conversion to Islam
- Timeline of early Islamic history
- Hadith of the warning
- Companions of the Prophet
- Early social changes under Islam
