= Dhobaura Upazila =

Dhobaura ধোবাউড়া
- Upazila
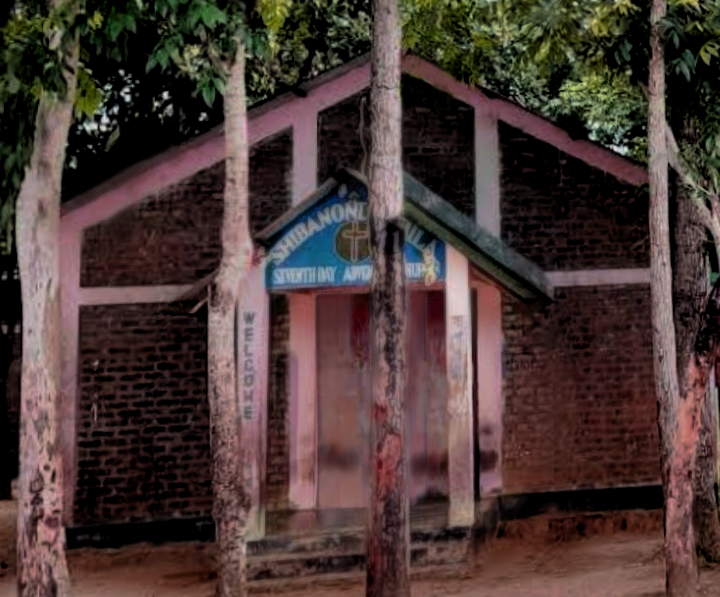
- A church in Dhobaura Upazila

- Coordinates: 25°5.5′N 90°32′E
- Country: Bangladesh
- Division: Mymensingh
- District: Mymensingh

Government
  - Upazila Chairman: David Rana Chisim
  - Vice Chairman: Md. Abul Fazal

Area
  - Total: 252.23 km^{2} (97.39 sq mi)

Population (2022)
  - Total: 217,467
  - Density: 862.18/km^{2} (2,233.0/sq mi)
- Time zone: UTC+6 (BST)
- Postal code: 2416
- Website: dhobaura.mymensingh.gov.bd

Dhobaura Upazila mauza geocode map

Dhobaura (Bengali: ধোবাউড়া) is an upazila of the Mymensingh District in Bangladesh.

== History ==
Since ancient times, Dhobaura has been inhabited by the Garo people. During the Mughal period, a mosque was built in the village of Darsha which is now in ruins.

Dhobaura was formerly known as Jikkowa Bazar. In the mid-18th century, the area was home to Babu Gauriballabh Sen, a prominent agriculturalist. At that time several dhobis led by a dhobi named Sita lived on the bank of a pond (today known as Sita Dighi) that was part of Sen's agricultural land. One day, Sita went missing and could not be found. Her body was found a few days later, floating in the pond. Thinking it was a ghostly incident, Sita's dhobis left the bank and migrated to an unknown place without informing anyone. The village then came to be known as Dhobaura, meaning floating dhoba in the Bengali language. A mouza centered in Dhobaura was later established and not long after it became a union parishad. In 1976, Dhobaura became a thana and in 1983 it was upgraded to an upazila.

From 1937 to 1949, Moni Singh's tanka movement spread to Dhobaura. During the Bangladesh Liberation War of 1971, a confrontation took place between the freedom fighters and the Pakistan Army on 19 July 1971. 11 people were killed, including two freedom fighters. On 3 October at midnight, the Pakistani army's surprise attacke on the Mukti Bahini camp at Guatala Bazar, led to the death of four freedom fighters. A mass killing was conducted the next day in the same place as well as in Taraikandi Ferry Ghat leading to 120 deaths. 7 mass graves were discovered in Guatala, Taraikandi, Zigatala, Defulia Para, Digalbagh, Milagara, and Goborchena.

== Geography ==
Dhobaura Upazila (Mymensingh district) with an area of 252.23 km^{2}, is bounded by the Indian state of Meghalaya on the north, Phulpur and Purbadhala upazilas on the south, Durgapur upazila on the east and Haluaghat upazila on the west. The main rivers are Nitai and Kangsa. There are many hillocks in the northern region of the upazila.

Dhobaura is located at 25.0917°N 90.5333°E. It has 44,007 households and a total area of 252.23 km^{2}.

== Demographics ==
Historical population
Year	Pop.	±%
1981	131,313	—
1991	157,027	+19.6%
2001	172,152	+9.6%
2011	196,284	+14.0%
2022	217,467	+10.8%
Source: Bangladesh Bureau of Statistics

Religions in Dhobaura Upazila (2022)
Religion	Percent
Islam	92.13%
Christianity	4.68%
Hinduism	3.16%
Other or not stated	0.03%

According to the 2022 Bangladeshi census, Dhobaura Upazila had 52,798 households and a population of 217,467. 11.61% of the population were under 5 years of age. Dhobaura had a literacy rate (age 7 and over) of 66.93%: 68.27% for males and 65.67% for females, and a sex ratio of 94.83 males for 100 females. 29,886 (13.74%) lived in urban areas. The ethnic population is 9,838 (4.52%), nearly all Garo and a small number are Hajong.

Population of Dhobaura upazila by ethnicity (2022)
1. Bengali (95.5%)
2. Garo (3.98%)
3. Others (0.54%)

== Economy and tourism ==
A porcelain mine was discovered in the village of Vedikura in Dakshin Maijpara union. Several Dhobaura's residents are employed abroad in countries such as Malaysia, Saudi Arabia, Bahrain, Kuwait, Singapore and the United Arab Emirates.

There are a number of tourist attractions in Dhobaura Upazila. The historic village of Darsha has a very old 3.3-acre pond known as Patharkata as well as ruins of a mosque dating back to the Mughal era. The 7.4-acre Dharam Shah reservoir in Langaljora, Gamaritala is also quite popular. Dhobaura is also home to the practice of bullfighting.

== Administration ==
Dhobaura thana, now an upazila, was established in 1976.

Porakandulia. The union parishads are subdivided into 99 mouzas and 164 villages.

The area of the town is 3.82 km^{2}. The town has one dak bungalow.

== Education ==
The average literacy rate of Dhubaura Upazila is 65%, with male literacy at 68% and female literacy at 62%. There are several educational institutions in the upazila, including 3 colleges, 1 technical school and college, 20 high schools, 3 junior high schools, and 6 madrasas. Primary education is supported by 43 government primary schools, 44 non-government primary schools, and 6 kindergartens.

== Notable people ==
- Debinash Sangma, footballer
- Tohura Khatun, footballer
- Maria Manda, footballer
- Sheuli Azim, footballer
- Sanjida Akhter, footballer
- Shamsunnahar, footballer

== See also ==
- Upazilas of Bangladesh
- Districts of Bangladesh
- Divisions of Bangladesh
