= Karimganj Upazila =

Karimganj করিমগঞ্জ
- Upazila
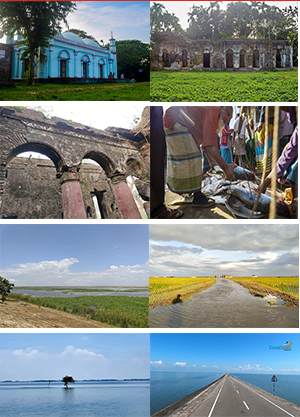
- Clockwise from Top Left: Jangalbari Fort Mosque, Ruins of Jangalbari Fort, Balikhola Fish Market, Jug Khaora Beel at Joyka Union, Karimganj-Nikli Beribadh, a Haor in Karimganj, Balikhola Beribadh, Ruined Arches of Jangalbari Fort

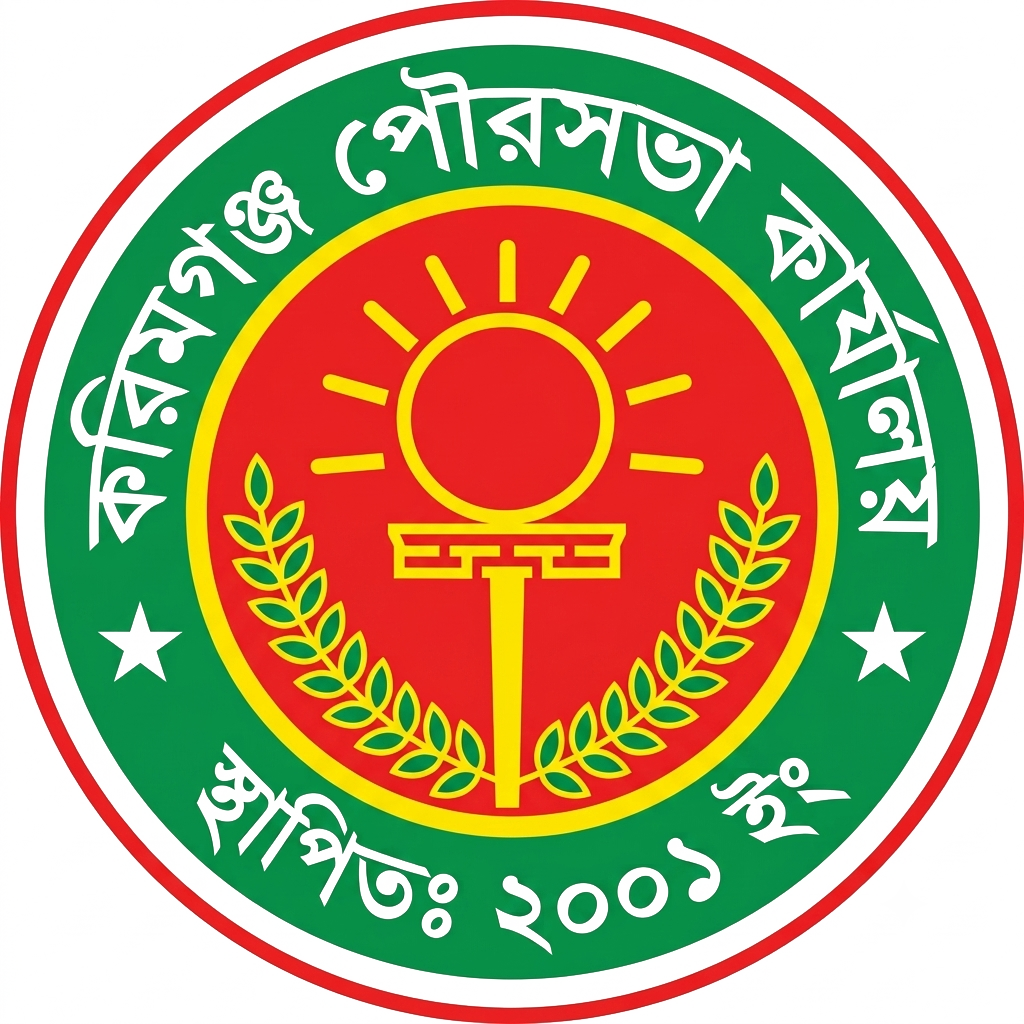
- Crest

- Coordinates: 24°27.5′N 90°53′E
- Country: Bangladesh
- Division: Dhaka
- District: Kishoreganj
- Union Councils: Joyka, Baragharia, Dehunda, Gundhar, Gujadia, Jafarabad, Kadirjangal, Kiratan, Niamatpur, Noabad, Sutarpara
- Established: 1909
- Headquarters: Karimganj

Government
  - MP (Member of Parliament): Osman Faruk(Kishoreganj-3)
  - UNO (Upazila Executive Officer): Umme Muslimah
  - Upazila Chairman: Umme Muslimah (Acting)
  - OC (Officer-in-Charge): Md. Shuhaib Khan

Area
  - Total: 200.50 km^{2} (77.41 sq mi)
- Elevation: 11 m (36 ft)

Population (2022)
  - Total: 328,288
  - Density: 1,637.3/km^{2} (4,240.7/sq mi)
- Time zone: UTC+6 (BST)
- Postal code: 2310
- Website: karimgonj.kishoreganj.gov.bd

Karimganj Upazila mauza geocode map

Karimganj (Bengali: করিমগঞ্জ (কিশোরগঞ্জ)) is an upazila of Kishoreganj District in the Division of Dhaka, Bangladesh.

== Geography ==
Karimganj is an upazila (sub-district) of Kishoreganj, located at 24.4583°N 90.8833°E. It has 62,774 households and total area 200.50 km^{2}. The area is full of greenery with water bodies surrounding the land.

== Demographics ==
Religions in Karimganj Upazila (2022)
Religion	Percent
Islam	98.37%
Hinduism	1.62%
Other or not stated	0.01%

According to the 2022 Bangladeshi census, Karimganj Upazila had 76,438 households and a population of 328,288. 11.69% of the population were under 5 years of age. Karimganj had a literacy rate (age 7 and over) of 62.19%: 62.22% for males and 62.15% for females, and a sex ratio of 92.54 males for every 100 females. 73,289 (22.32%) lived in urban areas.

According to the 2011 Census of Bangladesh, Karimganj Upazila had 62,774 households and a population of 287,807. 81,057 (28.16%) were under 10 years of age. Karimganj had a literacy rate (age 7 and over) of 38.58%, compared to the national average of 51.8%, and a sex ratio of 1034 females per 1000 males. 26,844 (9.33%) lived in urban areas.

As of the 1991 Bangladesh census, Karimganj has a population of 287807(2014). Males constitute 49.75% of the population, and females 50.25%. This Upazila's eighteen up population is 109240. Karimganj has an average literacy rate of 20.3% (7+ years), and the national average of 32.4% literate. This town is famous for fried fish (chapa shutki, or Shidol). From the nation's capital, Dhaka, it is nearly 140 km away towards the north-eastern corner. Karimganj is also famous for lakes and ponds. Karimganj town is the gateway to the largest inland water body (Haors) of the country.

== Administration ==
Karimganj Upazila is divided into Karimganj Municipality and 11 union parishads: Baragharia, Dehunda, Gundhar, Gujadia, Jafarabad, Joyka, Kadirjangal, Kiratan, Niamatpur, Noabad, and Sutarpara. The union parishads are subdivided into 85 mauzas and 186 villages.

Karimganj Municipality is subdivided into 9 wards and 17 mahallas.

Like other administrative units of Bangladesh, Karimganj also has a police station in the town. There is a health complex and a veterinary clinic in the municipality as well. The upazila complex is the center of all kinds of administrative activities mainly headed by the UNO (Upazila Executive Officer). There also lies a well equipped agricultural office, Fisheries Office, Live Stock Office, Social Welfare office. But, the most important of all is the office of the Local Government Engineering Division (LGED) which is responsible for facilitating infrastructural development in the upazila.

Mayor: Hazi abdul kaium, (Second period) from Awami League

Chairman: Saiful Islam Sumon

Vice Chairman:

Woman Vice Chairman: Roopon Raani Shorkar, from Awami League

Upazila Nirbahi Officer (UNO): Sharmin Sultana

== Infrastructure ==
The municipal water supply is yet to be introduced in the town though all the households have their private water supply system through UNICEF-6 Hand Tube well network. Good quality water supply is available in the town. One can have 24 hours internet and 24 hours electricity facilities (in urban area), Sporting ground facilities and Boating facilities in the town. There is no private hotel to stay in the town, but, a very well furnished rest house is available in the town that can be availed by tourists and others.

=== Transport ===
The location and topography of this town has made it very accessible from any corner of Bangladesh. To come from Dhaka, there are mainly two ways. Firstly, take a BUS directly to Karimganj and Secondly, take a bus or train to come, first to Kishoreganj (the district) and then to Karimganj. Journey from Dhaka to Kishoreganj generally takes 4 hrs and it takes another only 20 minutes to reach Karimganj. Buses that leave for Kishoreganj are available form the very morning until 7 o'clock in the evening in every half an hour. But, direct buses from Dhaka to Karimganj run in every 1.5 hours. So, the latter is preferable. There are two bus stands in the capital, Dhaka, where you will find buses leaving for Kishoreganj. The distance is around 140 km (4 hours).

== Education ==
Among educational institutes, the Shamsunnahar-Osman Ghani Shikkha Niketon is the best. There is a Boy's & Girls' High School and a Madrasa in the municipality. Karimganj Government College is also famous for its quality education. There is no university in this small town, but, it is the only Upazila (sub-district) of the country which has a large Poly-Technique Institute কিশোরগঞ্জ পলিটেকনিক ইন্সটিটিউট in the municipality offering Diploma in Engineering including Computer Science and Engineering, Electronics Engineering and two others Subjects. For the nearest university you have to travel only 7 kilometers by BUS or by Electricity Driven Cars (approximately 20 minutes journey).

== Notable residents ==
- Azimuddin Hanafi (1838–1922), Islamic scholar, orator, author and poet
- M Osman Ghani, vice chancellor of Dhaka University, was born in Karimganj in 1912 and was elected member of parliament for constituency Mymensingh-21 in 1979.

== See also ==
- Upazilas of Bangladesh
- Districts of Bangladesh
- Divisions of Bangladesh
