= Shamsul Islam =

Shamsul Islam (Bengali: শামসুল ইসলাম, lit. 'Sun of Islam') is a Bengali masculine given name of Arabic origin and may refer to:

- Ahmad Shamsul Islam (1924–2025), Bangladeshi scientist and educator
- Shamsul Islam Khan (1930–2006), Bangladeshi Minister of Industries
- Shamsul Islam (Munshiganj politician) (1932–2018), Bangladesh Nationalist Party politician and a minister of information, food, commerce and land
- Shamsul Islam (Chittagong politician) (born 1957), Bangladesh Jamaat-e-Islami leader.
- A. N. M. Shamsul Islam, Bangladeshi politician
- Shamsul Islam (Jamalpur politician), Bangladeshi politician
- Shamsul Islam (cricketer) (born 1994), Bangladeshi cricketer
- Shamsul Islam (author) (born 1947), Indian author, academic and activist

== See also ==
- Shams (name)
- Islam (name)
