= Shams al-Din =

Shams al-Din (IPA: /ʃamsaddiːn/) (Arabic: شمس الدين, lit. "sun of the faith") is an Arabic personal name or title.

Notable persons with this name are:

== 10th–13th century ==
- Shams al-Din Altınapa, Seljuk atabeg
- Muhammad ibn Ahmad Shams al-Din al-Maqdisi (c. 945–1000), Arab geographer
- Shams al-Din Ibn Fallus (1194–1240), Arab Egyptian mathematician
- Shams al-Din Muhammad bin Ali, or Suzani Samarqandi (died 1166), Persian poet
- Shams al-Din Ildeniz (died c. 1175), atabeg of Azerbaijan
- Shams al-Din Muhammad ibn al-Muqaddam (died 1188), Zengid governor of Damascus and Ayyubid emir of Baalbek
- Shams-ud-din Iltutmish (1192–1236), Muslim Turkic sultan of Delhi
- Shamsuddin Sabzwari (died 1247), Sufi missionary in southern Punjab
- Shams al-Din Muhammad, or Shams Tabrizi (1185–1248), Persian Sufi mystic
- Shams al-Din Lu'lu' al-Amini (died 1251), regent of Aleppo
- Shams al-Din 'Ali ibn Mas'ud (died 1255), Mihrabanid malik of Sistan
- Ajall Shams al-Din Omar (1211–1279), provincial governor of Yunnan
- Shams al-Dīn Abū Al-ʿAbbās Aḥmad Ibn Muḥammad Ibn Khallikān (1211–1282), Iraqi Shafi'i Islamic scholar
- Shams al-Din Juvayni (died 1285) vizier and sahib-divan under three Mongol Ilkhans
- Shams al-Din Muhammad ibn Mahmud al-Shahrazuri (died c. 1290), Kurdish physician and historian
- Shams al-Din Muhammad ibn Abi Talib al-Sufi al-Ansari al-Dimashqi (1256–1327), Arab geographer

== 14th–17th century ==
- Shams al-Din Muhammad (1257–1310), imam of the Nizari Isma'ili community
- Shams al-Din al-Samarqandi (c. 1250 – c. 1310), astronomer and mathematician from Samarkand
- Shamsuddin Firuz Shah (died 1322), sultan of the Bengali kingdom of Lakhnauti
- Shams al-Din al-Ansari al-Dimashqi (1256–1327), Arab geographer
- Shams al-Din Abu’Abdallah Muhammad ibn’Abdallah ibn Muhammad ibn Ibrahim ibn Muhammad ibn Yusuf Lawati al-Tanji Ibn Battuta (1304–1368), explorer
- Shams-ud-Din Shah Mir (1300–1342), ruler of Kashmir
- Ali Shams al-Din I (died 1348), leader of the Tayyibi Isma'ili community
- Shams al-Din ibn Fazl Allah (died c. 1348), leader of the Sarbadars of Sabzewar
- Khwaja Shams al-Din 'Ali (died c. 1352), leader of the Sarbadars of Sabzewar
- Shams ud din, or Shams Tabraiz (missionary) (died 1356), Ismaili saint in India
- Shamsuddin Ilyas Shah (died 1358), sultan of Bengal
- Shams al-Din Ibn Muflih (1308–1361), authority on Hanbali Law
- Shams ud-Din Amir Kulal (1278–1370), tribal head, scholar and religious figure in Turkistan
- Shams al-Din Abu Abd Allah al-Khalili (1320–1380), Syrian astronomer
- Shams al-Din al-Kirmani (1317–1384), Sunni scholar
- Khwaja Shams al-Din Muhammad Hafez-e Shirazi (1315–1390), Persian lyric poet
- Ali Shams al-Din II (died 1428), leader of the Tayyibi Isma'ili community
- Shams al-Din al-Fanari (1350–1431), Turkish logician, Islamic theologian, and Islamic legal academic
- Shamsuddin Ahmad Shah (1419–1436), ruler of Bengal
- Shams al-Din 'Ali ibn Qutb al-Din (c. 1387 – c. 1438), Mihrabanid malik of Sistan
- Shamsuddin Yusuf Shah (died 1481), ruler of Bengal
- Shamsuddin Muhammad Shah III (died 1482), sultan of Bahmani
- Shams ad-Din ibn Muhammad (died 1487), sultan of Adal
- Shamsuddin Muzaffar Shah (died 1494), Abyssinian sultan of Bengal
- Shams al-Din Muhammad (died c. 1494), Mihrabanid malik of Sistan
- Shams al-Din Muhammad ibn `Abd al-Rahman al-Sakhawi (1428–1497), Egyptian Islamic scholar
- Mir Shams-ud-Din Araqi (1440–1515), Sufi Shi'a missionary in Kashmir
- Ali Shams al-Din III (died 1527), leader of the Tayyibi Isma'ili community
- Shamsuddin Muhammad Khan Sur Shah Ghazi (died 1555), Sultan of Bengal
- Shamsuddin Muhammad Ataga Khan (died 1562), minister in Mughal court
- Shams al-Din al-Ramli (1513–1596), Egyptian Shafi'i scholar
- Khawaja Shamsuddin Khawafi (died 1600), minister to Emperor Akbar

== 18th century–present ==
- Shamseddin Amir-Alaei (1900–1994), Iranian politician and diplomat
- Muhammad Shamsuddeen III (1879–1935), Sultan of the Maldives
- Şemsettin Günaltay (1883–1961) prime minister of Turkey
- Şemsettin Mardin, Turkish diplomat
- Abul Kalam Shamsuddin (1897–1978), Bangladeshi journalist and politician
- Abu Jafar Shamsuddin (1911–1989), Bangladeshi author and novelist
- Shamsuddin Ahmed (1920–1971), Bangladeshi surgeon
- Khwaja Shams-ud-Din (1922–1999), Prime Minister of Jammu and Kashmir
- Shamsuddin Abul Kalam (1926–1997), Bangladeshi author and novelist
- Shamsuddin Qasemi (1935–1996), Bangladeshi Islamic scholar and politician
- Nasri Shamseddine (1927–1983), Lebanese singer and actor
- A. T. M. Shamsuddin (1927–2009), Bangladeshi author
- Khawaja Shamsuddin Azeemi (1927–2025), patriarch of the Sufi Order of Azeemia
- Mohammad Mehdi Shamseddine (1936–2001), Lebanese Twelver Shia Islamic scholar
- Shamsodin Vaezi (born 1936), Iraqi Twelver Shi'a Marja
- Abdul Aziz Shamsuddin (1938–2020), Malaysian politician
- Samsuddin Ahmed (1945–2020), Bangladeshi politician
- Shamsuddeen Usman (born 1949), Nigerian politician
- Semezdin Mehmedinović (born 1960), Bosnian writer
- Chettithody Shamshuddin (born 1970), Indian cricket umpire
- Mohammad Shamsuddin (born 1983), Bangladeshi sprinter
- Shamsuddin Amiri (born 1985), Afghan footballer
- Şemseddin Sami Efendi, pen-name of Sami Frashëri (1850–1904), Albanian writer, philosopher and playwright
- Ashari Samsudin (born 1985), Malaysian footballer
- Shamsuddin Ahmed (died 2020), Bangladeshi engineer and former MP
- AHM Shamsuddin Chowdhury Manik, Bangladeshi Supreme Court judge
- Shamsuddin Ahmed, Bangladeshi politician
- Ali Chamseddine (born 1953), Lebanese physicist
- Muhammad Ali Chamseddine (1942–2022), Lebanese poet and writer
- Chems-Eddine Hafiz (born 1954), Franco-Algerian lawyer
- Chems-Eddine Chitour (born 1944), Algerian scholar
- Chamseddine Rahmani (born 1990), Algerian footballer
- Chamseddine Harrag (born 1992), Algerian footballer
- Chamseddine Dhaouadi (born 1987), Tunisian retired footballer
- Chemseddine Chtibi (born 1982), Moroccan footballer
- Chemseddine Nessakh (born 1988), Algerian footballer
