= Shamsul Alam =

Shamsul Alam (Bengali: শমসুল আলম, lit. 'Sun of the World') is a Bengali masculine given name of Arabic origin and notable bearers of the name include;

- Shamsul Alam (Bir Uttam) (1947–2022), war veteran
- Shamsul Alam (economist) (born 1951), economist
- Shamsul Alam Manju (born 1955), footballer and coach
- Shamsul Alam Dudu (born 1957), Awami League politician
- Shamsul Alam Khan Milon (1957–1990), physician and political activist
- Shamsul Alam (cricketer), cricketer
- Shamsul Alam Pramanik (c. 1952–2023), Bangladesh Nationalist Party politician
- Shamsul Alam (Siraganj politician), Bangladesh Nationalist Party politician
- Shamsul Alam (civil servant) (born 1966), Bangladeshi democracy and human rights activist
- Khan Samsul Alam, Congress politician
- Shamsul Alam (Army officer)

== See also ==
- Shams (name)
- Alam
