= Jangalbari Fort =

Coordinates: 24.4503°N 90.8421°E

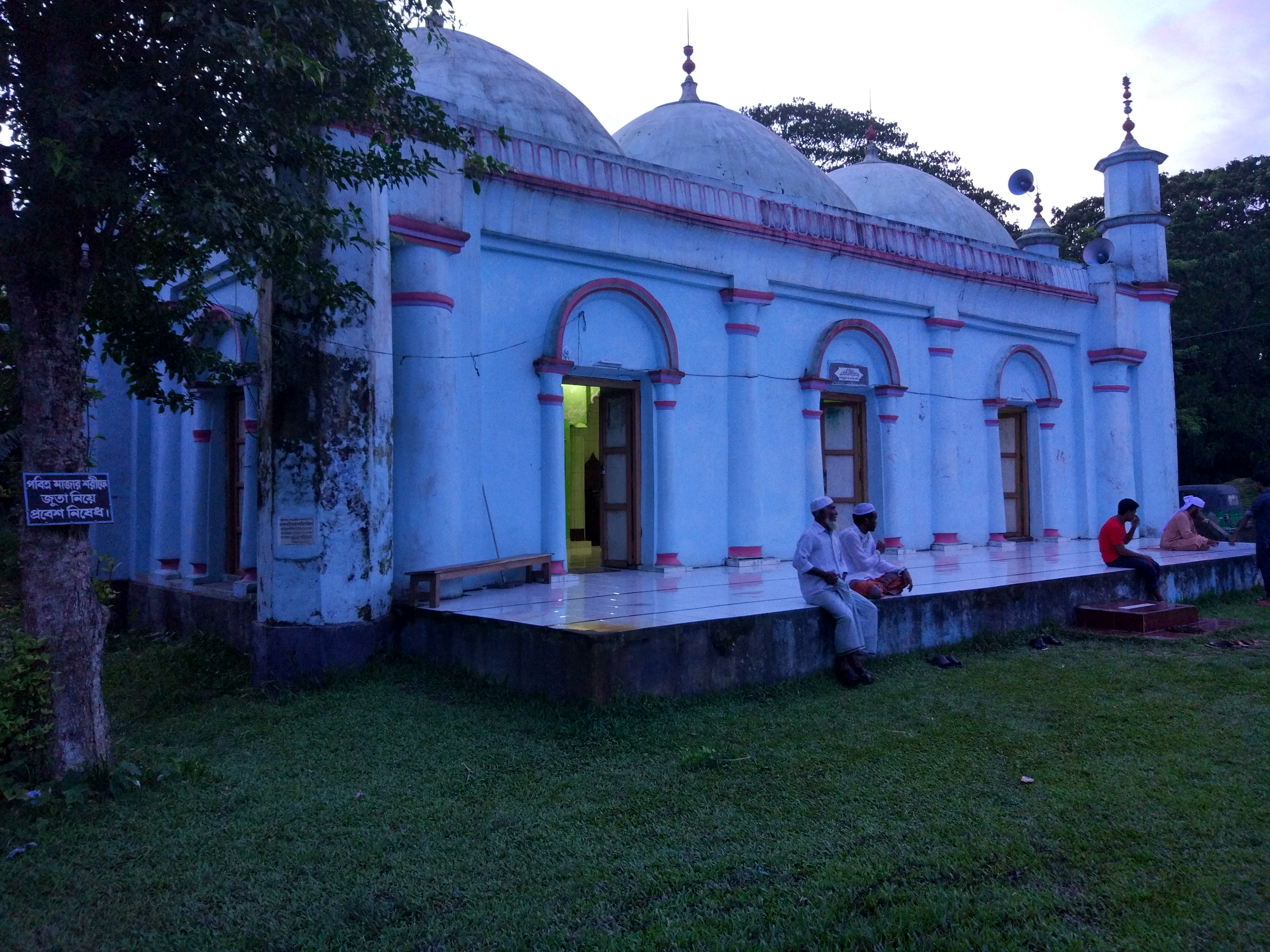
Jangalbari Fort Mosque

Jangalbari Fort (Bengali: জঙ্গলবাড়ি দুর্গ) is a fort situated in Jangalbari village under Karimganj Upazila of Kishoreganj District.

== History ==
After the Battle of Egarasindhur in 1597 AD, Isa Khan took over the Jangalbari Fort from Laksman Singh Hajra. After Musa Khan became loyal to Mughal force, the descendants of Isa Khan transferred their families from Sonargaon to Jangalbari Fort. Baro-Bhuyans conquered 12 parganas leading from this fort. The fort covers an area of 40 acres (16 ha).

== Gallery ==
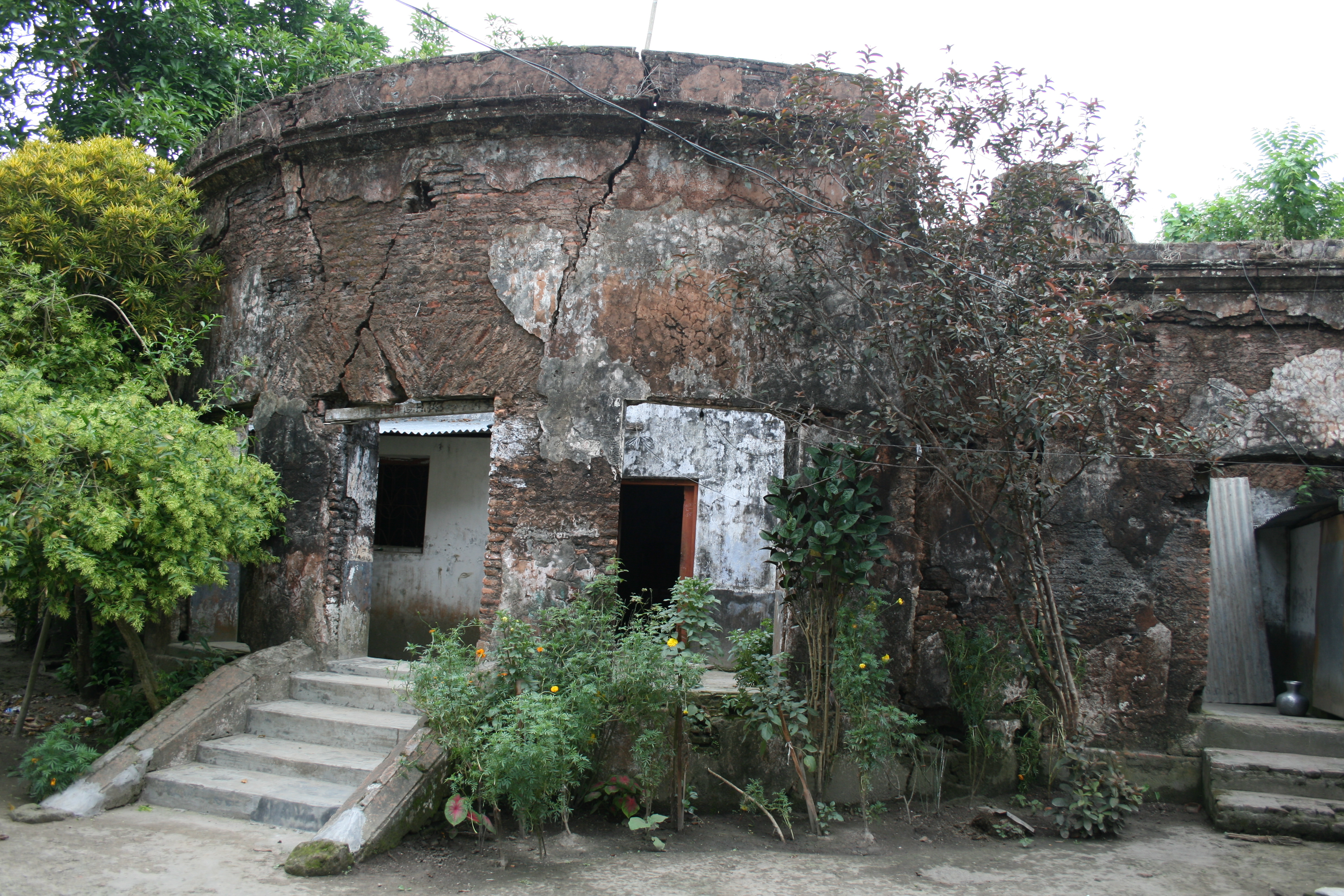
Front view of the ruined structure

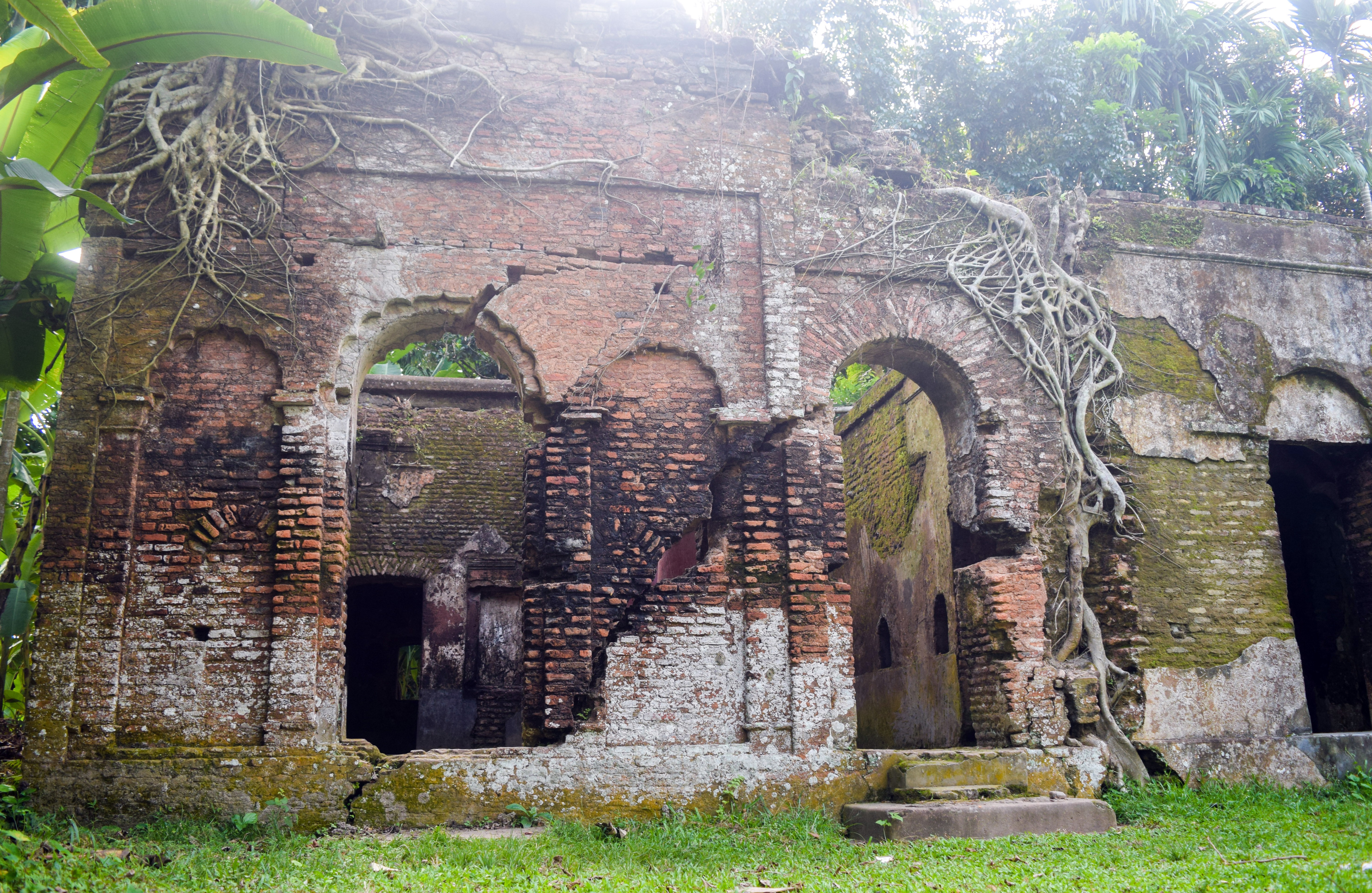
Entrance of the fort

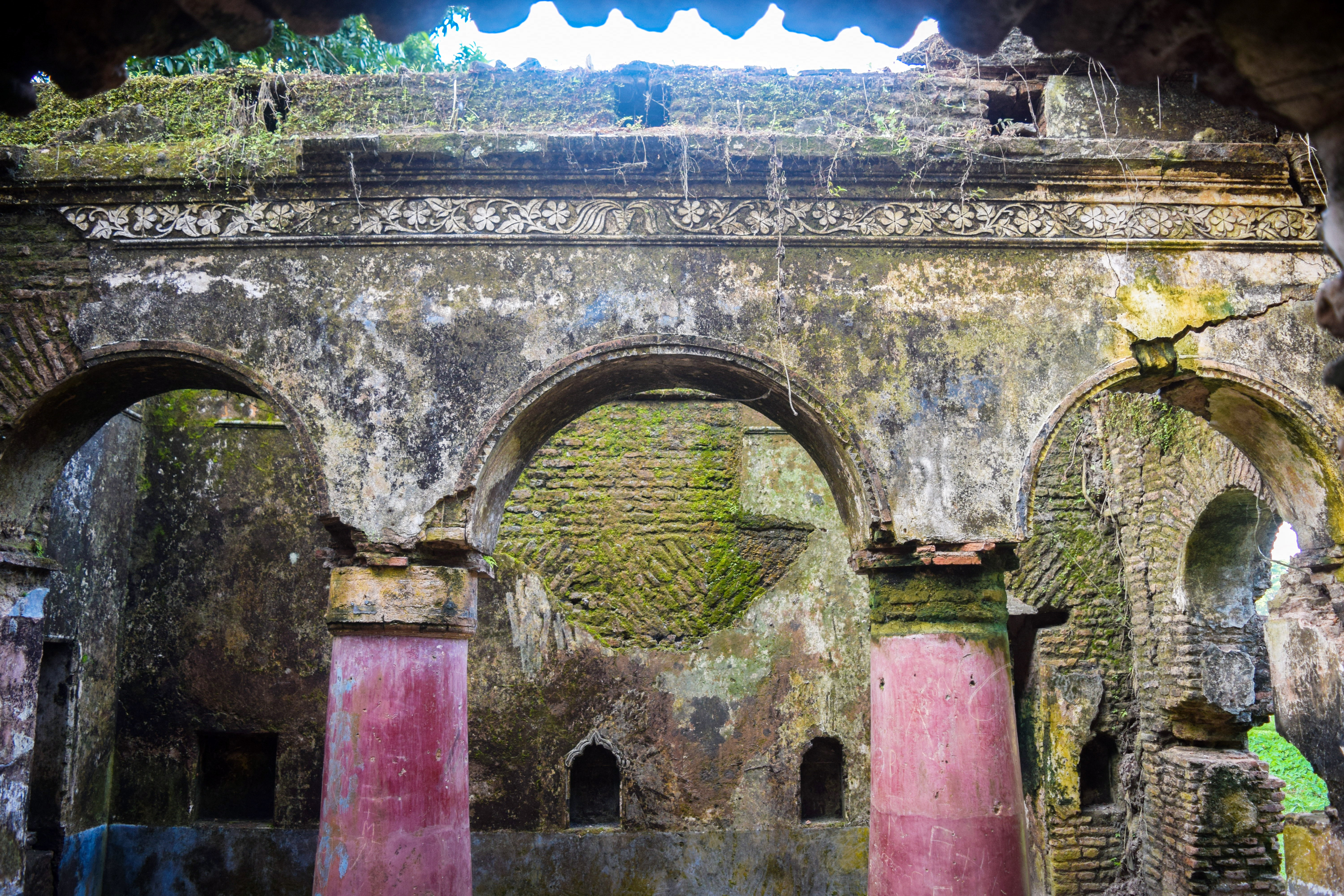
Interior of the fort

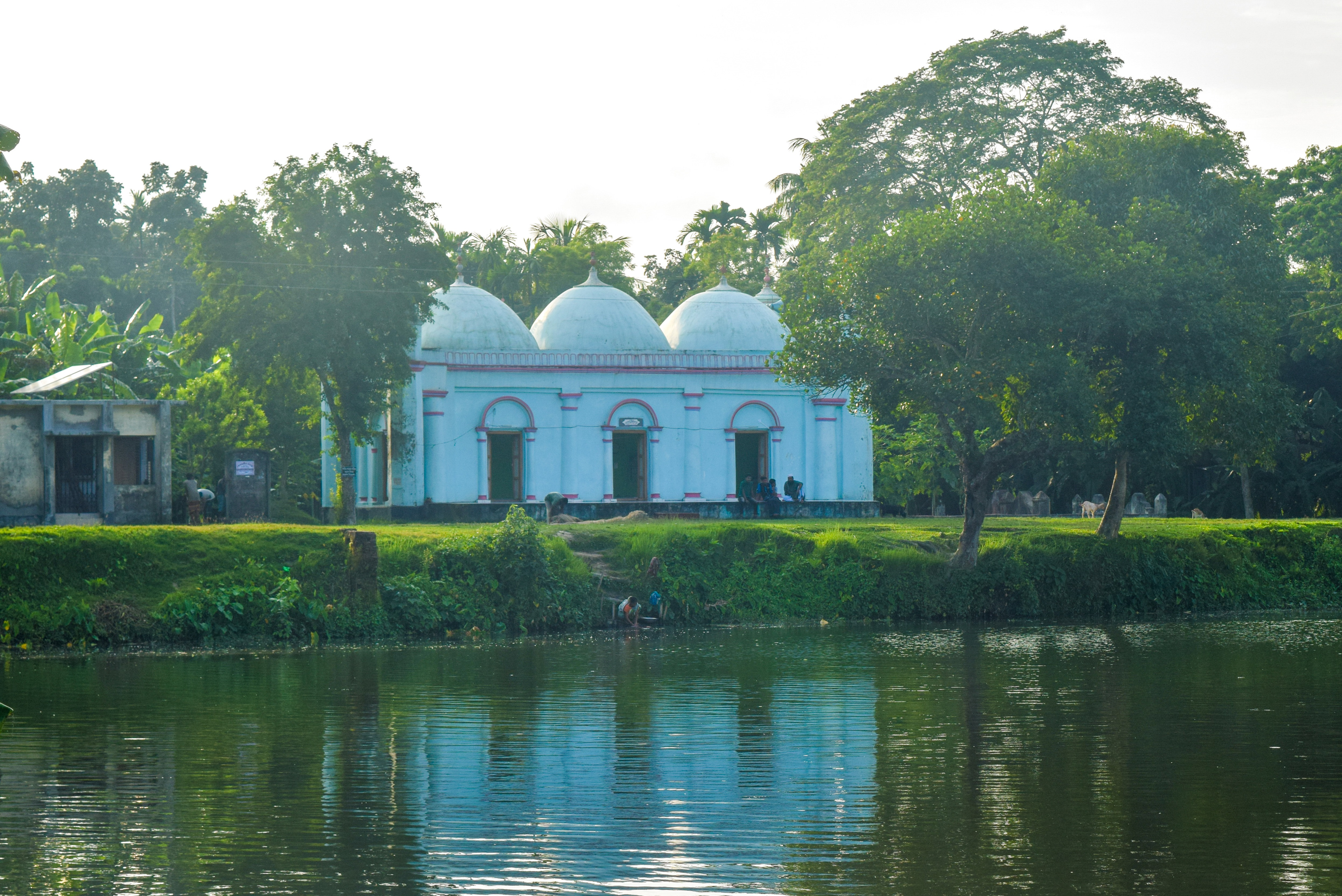
Pond and mosque of the fort

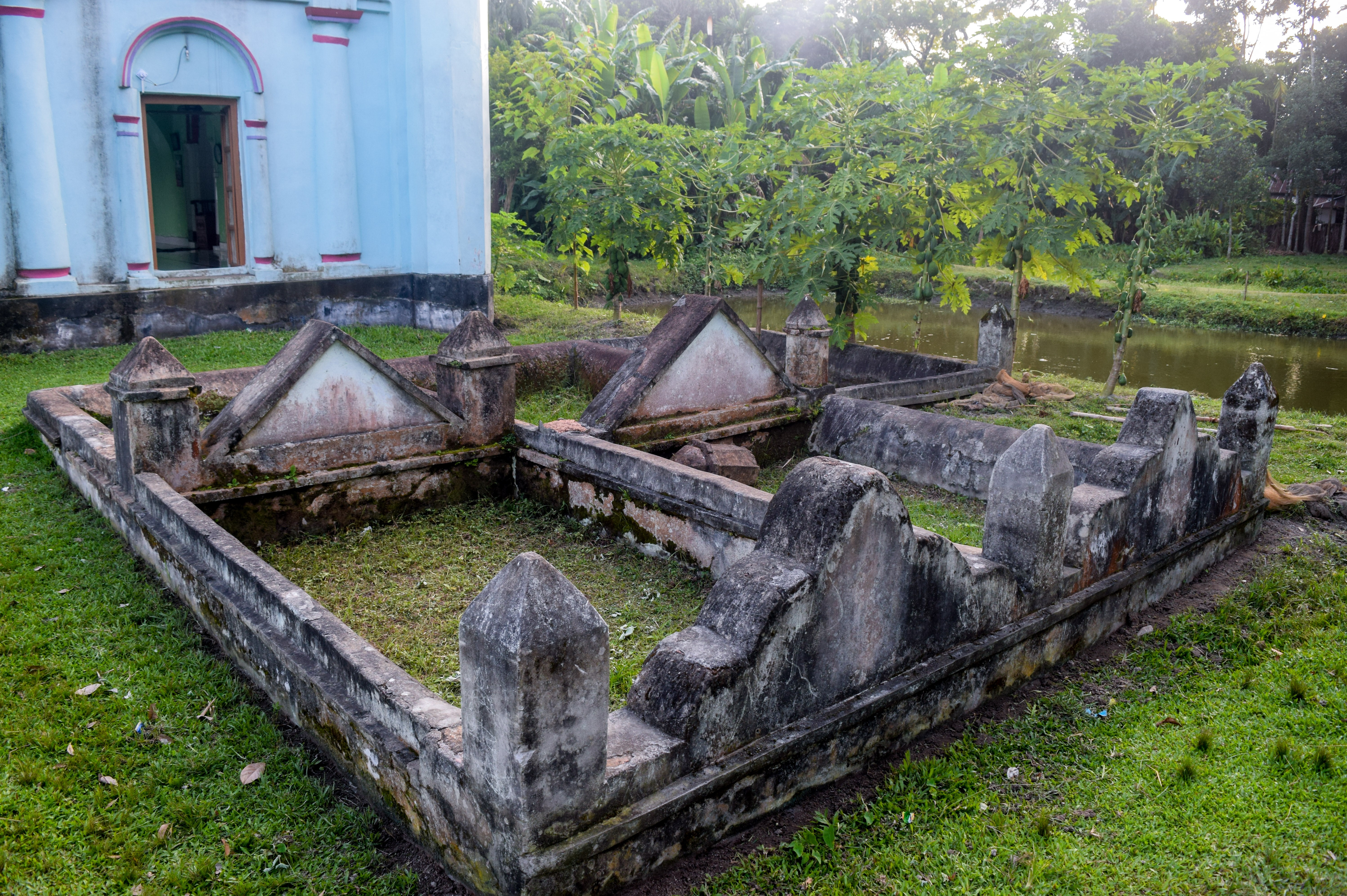
Tombs beside the mosque
