= Shamsuzzoha (name) =

Shamsuzzoha (Bengali: শমসুজ্জোহা, lit. 'Sun of the Dawn'), and variant spellings, is a Bengali masculine given name and surname of Arabic origin. Notable people with the name include:

== Given Name ==
- Shamsuddoha Khan Majlish (fl. 1986), former MP of Dhaka-12
- Shamsuzzoha Khan (fl. 1996), former MP of Naogaon-2

== Surname ==
- AKM Samsuzzoha (1924–1987), former MP from Narayanganj
- A R Shamsud Doha (1929–2012), former Foreign Minister of Bangladesh
- Luna Shamsuddoha (1953–2021), chairman of Janata Bank
- Md. Shamsuddoha (fl. 1991), Bangladeshi communist
- Mohammad Shamsuzzoha (1934–1969), writer and professor at the University of Rajshahi

== See also ==
- Shams (name)
- Badrudduja (disambiguation)
