= Syed Abdullah Tariq =

Indian Islamic author and philanthropist (born 1953)

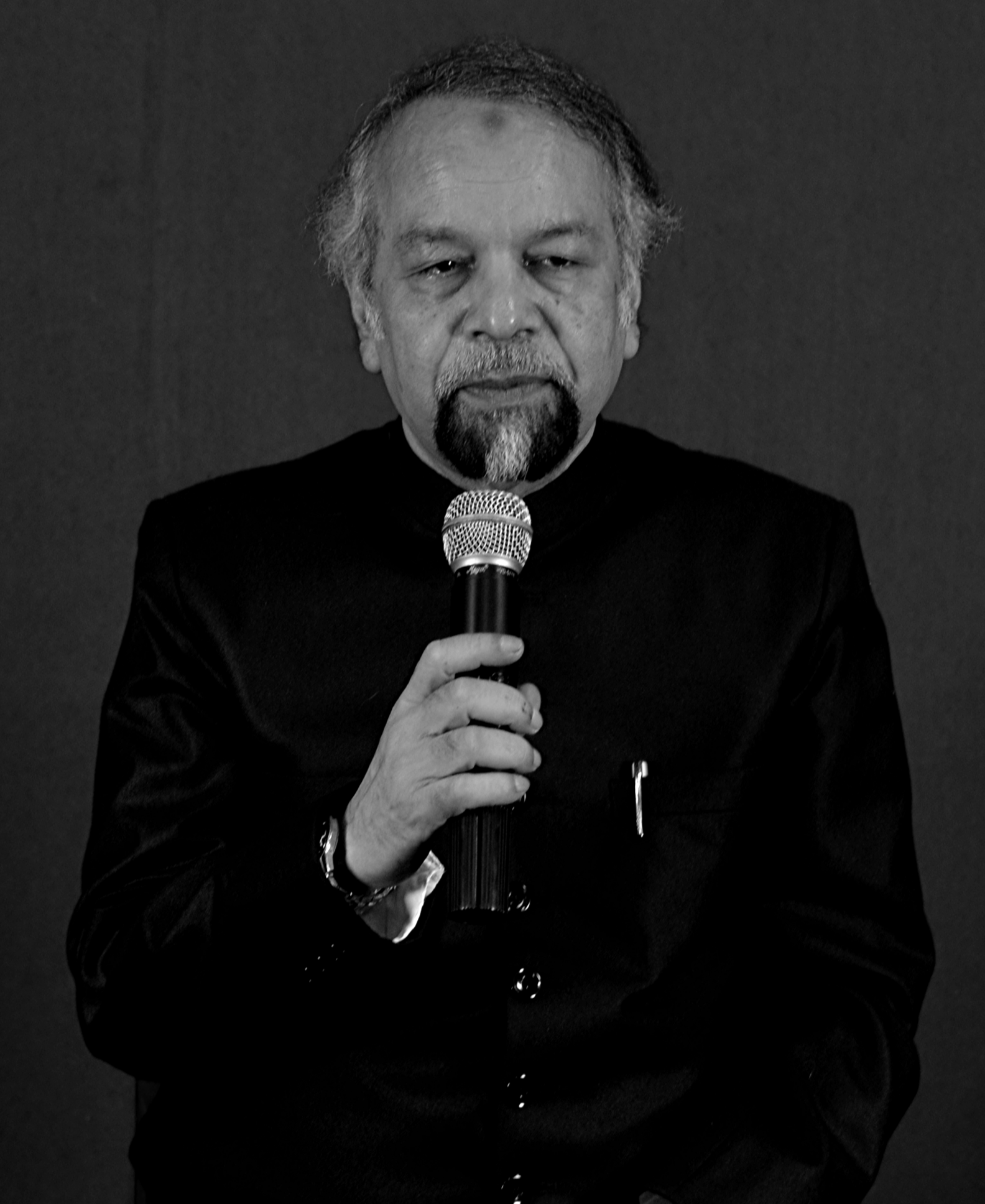
- Born: 1953 (age 72–73); Rampur, Uttar Pradesh, India
- Education: B.Sc. Electrical Engineering
- Years active: 1987–present
- Notable work: Agar Ab Bhi Na Jaage Toh

YouTube information
- Channel: Allama Syed Abdullah Tariq
- Subscribers: 126 thousand
- Website: allamasyedabdullahtariq.com

Syed Abdullah Tariq (born 1953) is an Indian Islamic scholar, author and philanthropist who established the World Organization of Religions and Knowledge (WORK), an international interfaith organization based in India.

== Early life and education ==
Abdullah Tariq was born in 1953 in a Syed family in the city of Rampur, Uttar Pradesh. He received a B.Sc. in Electrical Engineering from the Aligarh Muslim University in 1974. He was significantly influenced by Indian Muslim scholar Shams Naved Usmani, and was Usmani's chief disciple for six years (until Usmani's death in 1993).

== Career ==
In 1987, Tariq formed the World Organisation of Religions and Knowledge (WORK) under the guidance of Usmani, with Tariq appointed its president. WORK promotes unity through a message of peace and harmony. WORK has arranged relief programs such as offering first aid, food, and evacuation services irrespective of communal affiliations.

WORK was actively involved in relief activities for the 2001 Gujarat and 2005 Kashmir earthquakes. It also assisted people during the 2002 riots of Gujarat. In 2020, WORK volunteers undertook social work to help the economically challenged during the COVID-19 lockdown. They co-organized a peace procession with Heavenly Culture, World Peace, Restoration of Light (HWPL) in Rampur in 2018. WORK also commemorates Mawlid as Compassion Day every year. An annual medical camp is organized by the NGO in partnership with Hind Bhaichara Samiti, with the presidents of both organisations encouraging social welfare work on that day.

Tariq created a platform for interfaith dialogue which, in 2020, condemned attacks on a Gurudwara in Nankana Sahab. He has spoken in various Islamic and interfaith conferences and seminars in India and abroad. He has also been invited as the chief guest to an exhibition held in the Durbar Hall of Rampur Raza Library.

== Views ==
=== India ===
Abdullah suggests that India is the land of the origin of Islam, believing that the first prophet Adam descended there. He refers to the country as Punya Bhoomi which translates to 'Holy Land'. He also maintains that interfaith dialogue between Hindus and Muslims is crucial to uphold peace in India.

=== Babri Masjid dispute ===
In 1988, Tariq wrote an article for Urdu weekly Akhbar-e-Nau that discouraged the Muslim community from aggravating the Ayodhya dispute. He used the Quran and Sunnah to outline principles that instructed the community to refrain from taking the issue to the level of a clash. He maintains that the issue has worsened because of the stance of the Muslim leadership. In 2018, he publicly supported Salman Hussain Nadvi’s stance on the dispute.

== Publications ==
Tariq's works include:

- Agar Ab Bhi Na Jaage Toh (Now or Never) – a collection of the ideas of Shams Naved Usmani with a commentary by Tariq. It encourages Muslims to view Sanatan Dharma in a different light and asserts that Hindus are the descendants of the people of Noah.
- Ekta Ka Aadhar
- Gujarat Ke Baad Haalat Aur Hal and Yug Parivartan – Islamic Drishtikon.

== Accolades and criticisms ==
Allama Syed Abdullha Tariq was conferred with the Ramkinkar Award in 1992 by Ramayanam Trust Ayodhya. In 2020, The Delhi Minorities Commission announced an award for him, for his contributions toward promoting communal harmony.

In 2012, Islamic scholar Syed Shahid Ali Rizvi demanded that Tariq be arrested for belittling the Quran. Tariq dismissed the allegations by clarifying his stance and faith in the Quran.
