= Shams Ul Haq (journalist) =

German-Pakistani journalist

Shams Ul Haq Qudoos
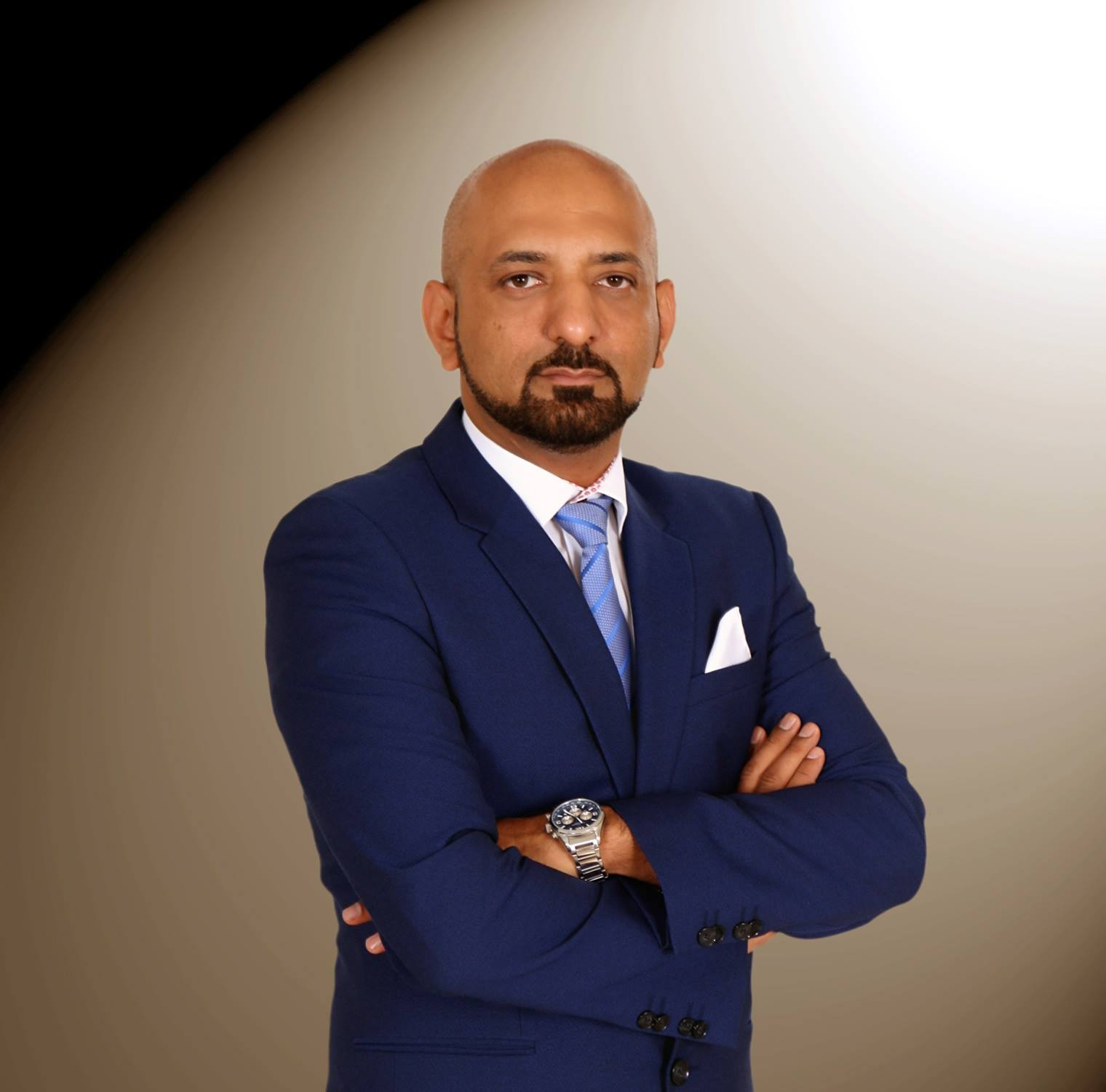
- Born: Jhang, Punjab in Pakistan
- Citizenship: German
- Occupation(s): Journalist and author
- Years active: 2007–present

Shams Ul Haq Qudoos (born 1985) is a German-Pakistani journalist and author. He currently works as an Asia correspondent for N24 (WELT).

== Early life ==
Ul Haq was born in Jhang District in Punjab, Pakistan to a Kashmiri street vendor and watermelon seller. In 1990, at the age of 15, he came to Germany as an unaccompanied minor asylum seeker and with the help of a scholarship he moved to Bad Marienberg. After training as a welder, he worked for various companies. He was granted German citizenship in 2001, moved to Offenbach and ran a cell phone shop with a postal agency in Frankfurt-Nordend.

== Career ==
Ul Haq started his career in 2007 at Die Weltt where he interviewed Benazir Bhutto. His main area of journalism is Islamic radicalization and terrorism with a focus on the middle east.

In 2016, he spent several months living in 35 refugee camps in Germany, Austria, and Switzerland to investigate the conditions of these camps. In his book, "Die Brutstätte des Terrors", he detailed his findings and experiences and claimed that inadequate living conditions and lack of opportunities to indulge in religious practices, and long waits for asylum decisions were leading to the radicalization of refugees by Islamists. He also claimed that refugees were also being forced into prostitution. In an interview with the Berliner Morgenpost, Ul-Haq said that refugee shelters in Germany were becoming "a breeding ground for Salafists and terrorists", and that the country was not just importing terrorists, but also breeding them itself.

Haq also conducted undercover reporting work in European mosques investigating Islamic radicalization. He published his findings in his book "Eure Gesetze interessieren uns nicht!" which was published in October 2018.

In 2020, Haq and his colleague Susana Santina produced a behind the scenes documentary about deradicalization centres in Pakistan and the former militants who were kept at these camps.

He reported from Afghanistan in the aftermath of the NATO and US forces evacuation from Afghanistan.
