= Shamsunnahar-Osman Ghani Shikkha Niketon =

Coordinates: 24.503°N 90.843°E

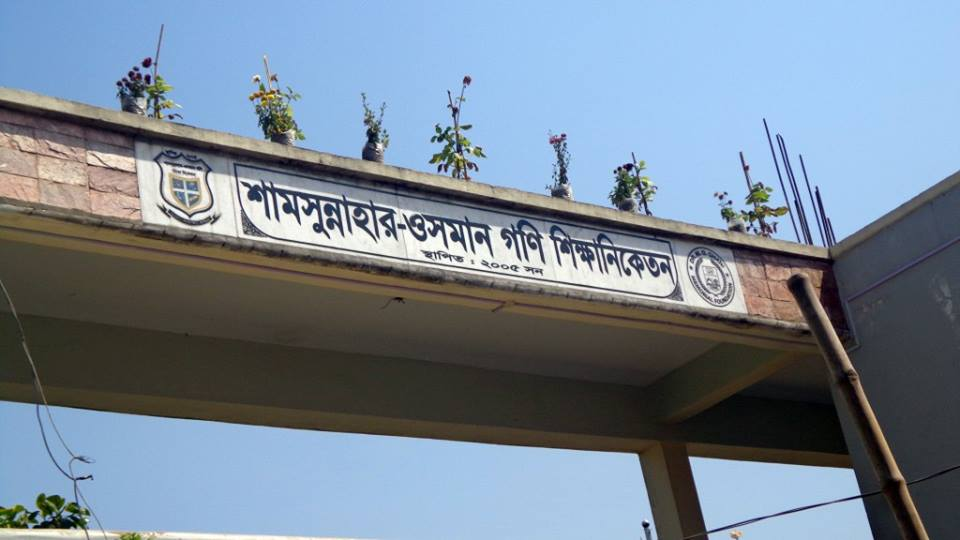
Shamsunnahar-Osman Ghani Shikkha Niketon

Location
- Gujadia Union, Karimgonj Upazila, Kishoreganj; Karimganj Upazila; Bangladesh

Information
- Type: Private secondary school
- Established: 2005
- Enrollment: 1,200
- Accreditation: Board of Intermediate and Secondary Education, Dhaka
- Website: https://sogsn.edu.bd

Shamsunnahar-Osman Ghani Shikkha Niketon (SOGSN) is a private higher secondary school in Karimganj Upazila, Kishoreganj District, Dhaka Division, Bangladesh. It was established in 2005 by Dr. Osman Faruk and (former Education Minister of Bangladesh, 2001- 2006) and his family member.

== History ==
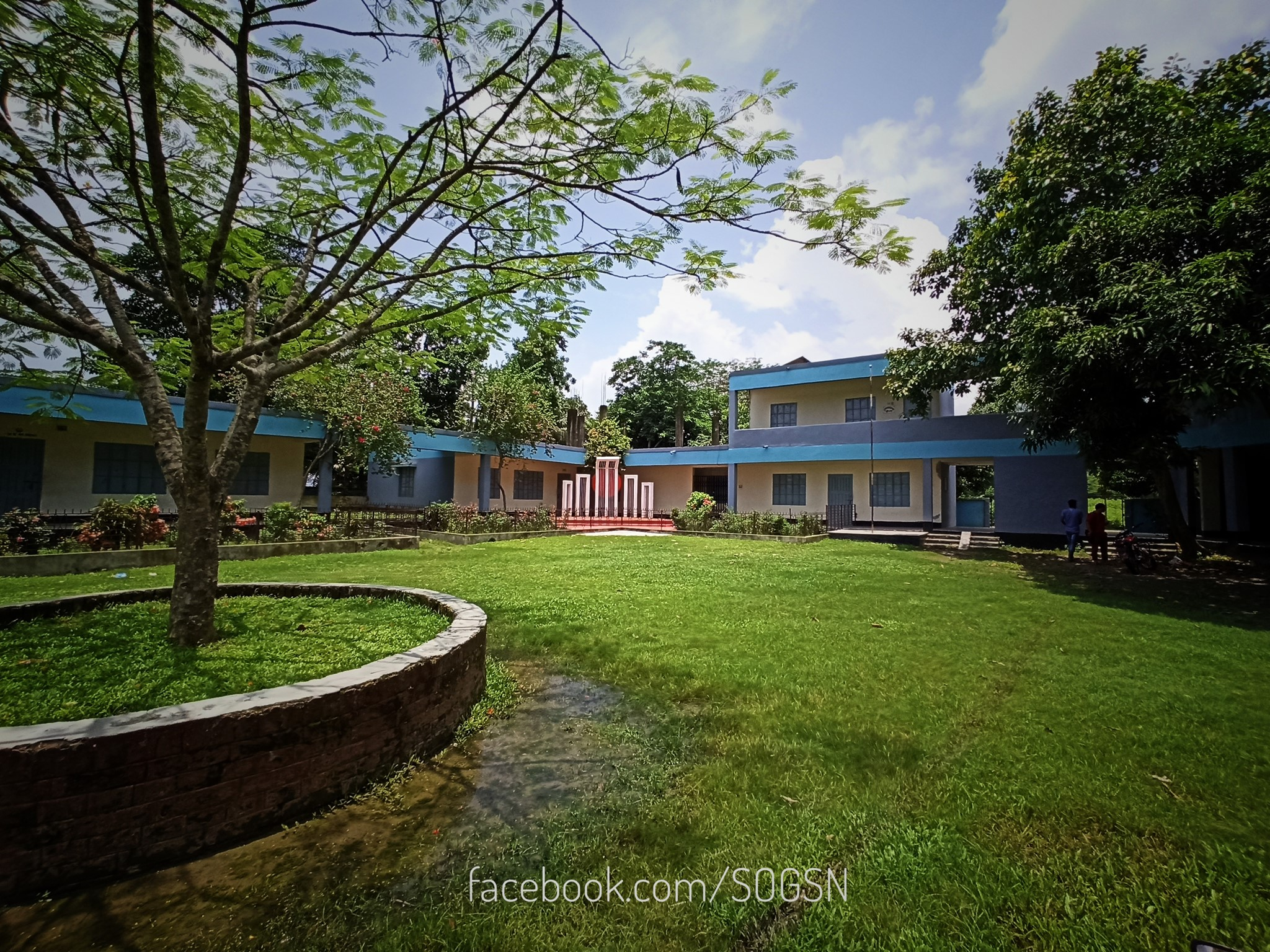
School Sahid Minar

=== Beginning ===
Below is a list of the first teachers at the school, upon its opening.

- Titul Islam (Headmaster)
- Abdul Haque (Assistant Headmaster)

Present

- Rafiqul Alam (Headmaster)
- Habibur Rahman (Assistant Headmaster)

== Admission ==
Usually students are admitted in class 6 and 9. Admission can be considered in other classes if a vacancy is created. The admission test is taken usually in the first week of January.

== Class and section system ==
Each class is divided into two sections — A and B — each containing 50 students.

== Uniform ==
The uniform is a sky blue shirt with full-length navy blue pants for boys.

== Co-curricular activities ==
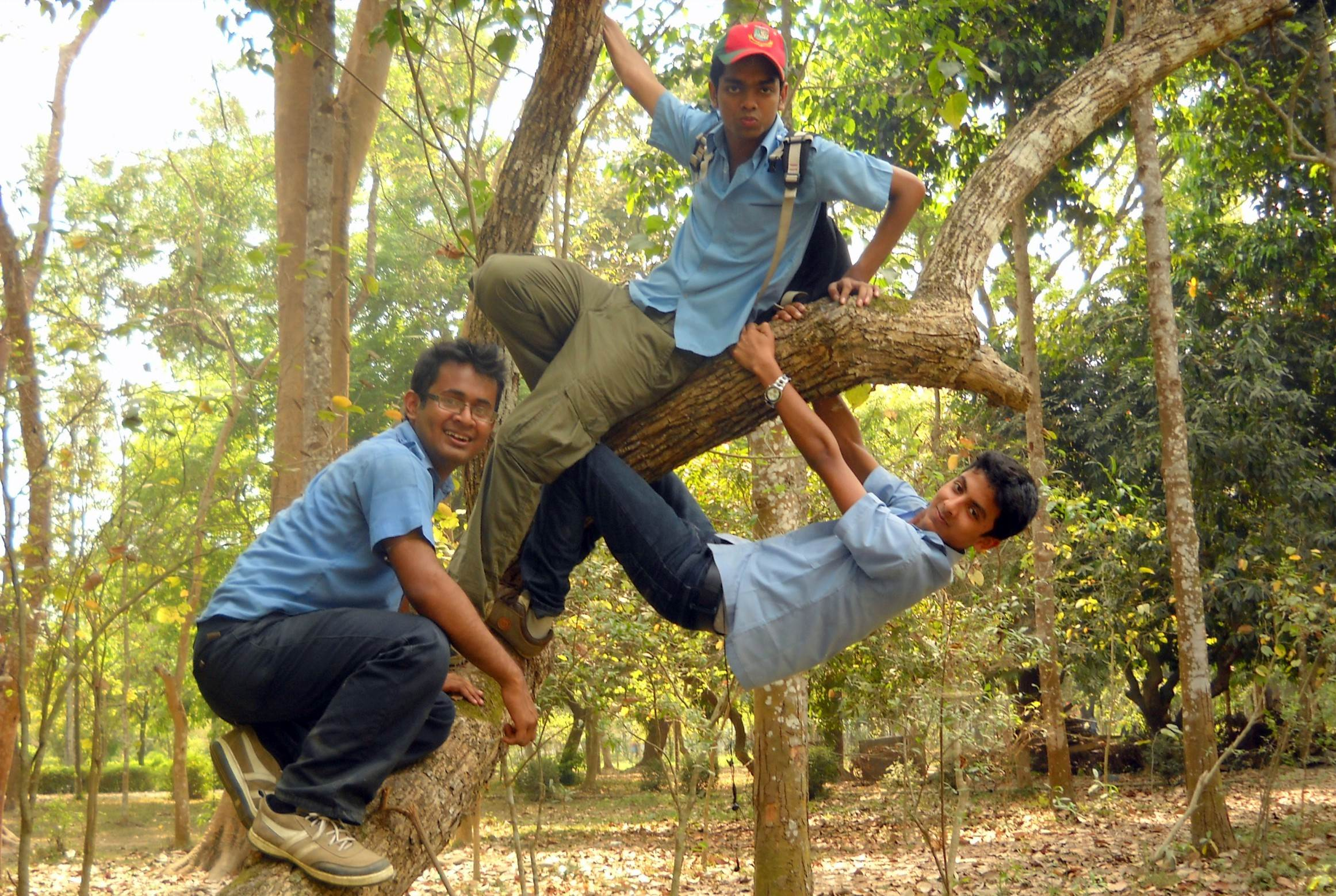
A moment from SOGSN students study tour 2012.

There are some clubs and organizations to help co-curricular activities. There is scouting for the school students.

== Library ==
The library has approximately 2,500 books.

== Awards ==
- 1. 2013 Best school award in Kishoreganj District for SSC result
- 2. 2014 Best upazila school award (1 lakh taka by Bangladesh govt) in Karimganj Upazila

== Documentary ==
A Documentary Film named 'Remembering School' by Farhan Alvee (Batch2012) published in 2020. The film is made to recall the memories of School days.
