= Shamsul Huda (disambiguation) =

Shams ul Huda (Arabic: شمس الهدى; transliterations vary), an Arabic phrase meaning "Sun of the Guidance", is a male Muslim given name. Notable bearers of the name include;

- Syed Shamsul Huda (1862–1922), Bengali nawab and politician
- Shamsul Huda Panchbagi (1897–1988), Bangladeshi Islamic scholar and politician
- Shamsul Huda Chaudhury (1920–2000), former speaker of Bangladeshi parliament
- Shamsul Huda (born 1932), Bangladeshi civil servant and activist
- Shams-ul-Huda Shams (1938–2005), Afghan politician and journalist
- Samsul Huda Bachchu (1943–2018), Bangladeshi army major and politician
- A. T. M. Shamsul Huda (1943–2025), Bangladeshi commissioner
- Shamsul Huda Khan (died 2006), Bangladeshi politician
- Samsul Huda (born 1971), Indian politician from Assam
- Md Shamsul Huda (died 2025), Bangladeshi Supreme Court judge

== See also ==
- Shamsul Huda Stadium, Jessore, Bangladesh
- S. H. Bihari (Shamsul Huda Bihari), Indian lyricist
- Mohammad Shamsul Huda, Bangladeshi politician
