= Shamsunnahar =

Shams un Nahar (Arabic: شمس النهار, Bengali: শামসুন্নাহার; transliterations vary), an Arabic phrase meaning "Sun of the morning", is a female Bengali Muslim given name. Notable bearers of the name include;

- Shamsunnahar Mahmud (1908–1964), Bengali writer, politician and educator
- Shamsunnahar Khwaja Ahsanullah (1934-2025), Bangladeshi aristocrat and former MP
- Shamsun Nahar Iffat Ara (born 1939), Bangladeshi writer and social activist
- Shamsun Nahar (born 1957), Bangladeshi politician
- Shamsun Nahar Ahmed (died 2017), Bangladeshi politician
- Shamsun Nahar Begum, Bangladeshi lawyer and politician
- Shamsun Nahar Shelley, Bangladeshi politician
- Shamsunnahar (footballer, born 2003), Bangladeshi footballer
- Shamsunnahar Jr. (born 2004), Bangladeshi footballer

== See also ==
- Shamsunnahar-Osman Ghani Shikkha Niketon, a private secondary school in Kishoreganj District, Bangladesh
