= Shams Naved Usmani =

Indian Muslim scholar

Maulana, Acharya Shams Naved Usmāni

Personal life
- Born: 1931 Deoband, British India
- Died: 26 August 1993 (aged 61–62)
- Education: University of Lucknow
- Relatives: Usmani family of Deoband

Religious life
- Religion: Islam

Shams Naved Usmani (1931 – 26 August 1993) was an Indian Muslim scholar. He belonged to the Usmani family of Deoband and was an alumnus of the University of Lucknow. He held the titles of Acharya and Maulana together. He was known for his inter-faith dialogues.

== Birth and education ==
Shams Naved Usmani was born in Deoband into the Usmani family in 1931. Islamic scholar Shabbir Ahmad Usmani was one of his uncles.

Usmani received his primary Islamic education at home. He learnt Sanskrit on his own and did his post-graduation from the University of Lucknow.

== Academic studies and literary works ==
Usmani studied Hindu scriptures and identified Noah as Manu. He stated that Vedas are divine, but corrupted books, as the Islamic traditions hold belief about Injil and Torah. He has accused Hindus of attributing wrong beliefs to Manu.

According to Tabish Mehdi, "the results that came out of his studies created an atmosphere of restlessness in the academic world". His studies received a wide criticism from the academics of India. Usmani held the titles of Acharya and Maulana altogether.

Usmani himself did not write any books. However, his anecdotes were collected and compiled by Syed Abdullah Tariq. These works include Agar Abh Bhi Na Jāge To (transl. Now or Never).

== Death and legacy ==
Usmani died on 26 August 1993. He was survived by his wife Khadeja Naved Usmani.

== Bibliography ==
- Sikand, Yoginder (31 July 2004). "NOW or NEVER: The inter-faith dialogue project of Acharya Maulana Shams Naved 'Usmani". Muslims in India Since 1947: Islamic Perspectives on Inter-Faith Relations (2004 ed.). Routledge. pp. 133–150. ISBN 9781134378258.
