= Shamsur Rahman =

Shamsur Rahman (Arabic: شمس الرحمن) is a male Muslim given name, meaning sun of the Most Gracious. Notable bearers of the name include

- Shamsur Rahman (politician) (1915–2008), Bangladeshi politician, Member of 3rd Pakistan National Assembly
- Gazi Shamsur Rahman (1921–1998), Bangladeshi judge, writer and television personality
- Shamsur Rahman (poet) (1929–2006), Bangladeshi poet, columnist and journalist
- Shamsur Rahman Kallu (1932–1994), intelligence officer and a general in the Pakistan Army
- Shamsur Rahman Khan Shahjahan (1933–2012), Bangladeshi politician
- Shamsur Rahman Faruqi (born 1935), Indian poet, Urdu critic and theorist
- M. Shamsur Rahman (1940–2020), Bangladeshi academic
- Shamsur Rahman Sherif (1941–2020), Bangladeshi former minister
- Shamsur Rahman (cricketer) (born 1988), Bangladeshi cricketer
- Shams Ur Rehman Alavi, Indian journalist
