= Shams ibn Uthman =

Arab Muslim military commander (594–625)

- Arabic: شمس بن عثمان
- Born: c. 594; Mecca, Hejaz, Arabia
- Died: 625 CE (3 AH); Mount Uhud, near Medina, Hejaz
- Burial place: Mount Uhud, near Medina
- Spouse: Umm Habib Na’am bint Sa’id
- Children: Abdullah
- Relatives: Uthman ibn al-Sharid (father); Safiyya bint Rabi’a ibn Abd Shams (mother)
- Military career
- Allegiance: Islam
- Branch: Rashidun army
- Service years: 613–625
- Rank: Companion (Sahabi)
- Commands: Defender of Muhammad at Battle of Uhud
- Conflicts: Battle of Badr; Battle of Uhud †

Shams ibn Uthman (Arabic: شمس بن عثمان; died 625 CE) was an early companion (sahabi) of the Islamic prophet Muhammad. He was among the first converts to Islam from the Quraysh tribe and participated in both the first migration to Abyssinia and the Hijra to Medina. He fought in the battles of Badr and Uhud, where he was martyred while defending Muhammad.

== Biography ==
Shams ibn Uthman ibn al-Sharid ibn Harmi ibn Amir ibn Makhzum was known for his radiant appearance, earning him the nickname "Shams" (sun), which became more widely used than his given name, Uthman. His mother, Safiyya bint Rabi’a ibn Abd Shams ibn Abd Manaf, was the sister of Utbah and Shaiba, prominent leaders of pre-Islamic Quraysh.

Shams migrated to Abyssinia during the early persecution of Muslims, returning later to Mecca before joining Muhammad in Medina. In Medina, he was paired in brotherhood with Hanzala ibn Abi Amir. Shams was present at the battles of Badr and Uhud, where he displayed exceptional courage defending Muhammad.

During the Battle of Uhud, Shams fought fiercely, reportedly moving left and right to shield Muhammad from attacks. He was severely wounded and was carried to the house of his cousin, Umm Salamah. Shams died there after a day and a night, at approximately 34 years of age. Muhammad ordered that Shams be buried at Mount Uhud in the same clothes he wore during the battle, without washing or performing the funeral prayer (Salat al-Janazah).

He left behind a son, Abdullah, whose mother was Umm Habib Na’am bint Sa’id bin Yarbu’ bin Ankasha bin Aamer bin Makhzum.

== Legacy ==
The poet Hassan ibn Thabit mourned Shams ibn Uthman, addressing his sister with lines honoring his bravery and service to Islam. His wife, Umm Habib, also lamented his death, remembering his courage and status among the companions.

Shams ibn Uthman is remembered as a courageous Sahabi who gave his life defending Muhammad, exemplifying loyalty and sacrifice in the early Muslim community.

== See also ==
- Sahaba
- Battle of Uhud
- Migration to Abyssinia
