= Shams Tabraiz (missionary) =

Shams Tabraiz (died 1356), also known as Shams ud din, was an Ismaili saint in India who preached Islam in the Sindh and Gujarat region of India. He is buried in Kutch.
