= Union councils of Narail District =

Union councils of Narail District (Bengali: নড়াইল জেলার ইউনিয়ন পরিষদসমূহ) are the smallest rural administrative and local government units in Narail District of Bangladesh. The district consists of 1 municipalities, 3 upazilas, 39 union porishods and 651 villages.

== Narail Sadar Upazila ==
Narail Sadar Upazila is divided into Narail Municipality and 13 union parishads, The union parishads are subdivided into 180 mauzas and 231 villages, 9 wards and 24 mahallas.

- Maijpara Union
- Hobkhali Union
- Chandiborpur Union
- Auria Union
- Shahabad Union
- Tularampur Union
- Sheikhati Union
- Kalora Union
- Singasholpur Union
- Bhadrabila Union
- Banshgram Union
- Bisali Union
- Mulia Union

== Lohagara Upazila ==
Lohagara Upazila has 12 union parishads, 154 mauzas and 217 villages, 9 wards and 24 mahallas.

- Naldi Union
- Lahuria Union
- Shalnagar Union
- Noagram Union
- Lakshmipasha Union
- Joypur Union
- Lohagara Union
- Dighalia Union
- Mallikpur Union
- Kotakol Union
- Itna Union
- Kashipur Union

== Kalia Upazila ==
Kalia Upazila has 14 union parishads, 111 mauzas, 187 villages, 9 wards and 19 mahallas.

- Babra Hasla Union
- Purulia Union
- Hamidpur Union
- Mauli Union
- Salamabad Union
- Khasial Union
- Joynagar Union
- Kalabaria Union
- Baioshona Union
- Pahardanga Union
- Perali Union
- Chanchuri Union
- Boronal Eliasabad Union
- Panchgram Union
