= Panchuria =

Coordinates: 23°08′50″N 89°39′02″E

Panchuria is a small village in rural Bangladesh under Lohagara Upazila of Narail District. It is situated at the banks of the Nabaganga River.

This village has a primary school and a secondary school. Besides a madrasa (religious school), there is a market and seven mosques. The population is 100% Muslim, which is unique as surrounding villages are mixed with Hindu-Muslim population.

Panchuria is a rural settlement in Mallikpur Union, Lohagara Upazila, Narail District, Bangladesh. It is recorded as a mouza, an administrative unit used for land and cadastral records in Bangladesh. The village is served by local educational facilities, including Panchuria Secondary School, which is listed in education directories as a secondary-level institution.
