= Narail-1 =

Constituency of Bangladesh's Jatiya Sangsad

Coordinates: 23.04°N 89.63°E

- Constituency for the Jatiya Sangsad
- District: Narail District
- Division: Khulna Division
- Electorate: 238,174 (2018)

Current constituency
- Created: 1984
- Parliamentary Party: Bangladesh Nationalist Party
- Member of Parliament: Biswas Jahangir Alam
- ← 92 Magura-2 94 Narail-2 →

Narail-1 is a constituency represented in the National Parliament of Bangladesh since 1984. From 13 February 2026, this constituency is represented by the Bangladesh Nationalist Party member Biswas Jahangir Alam.

== Boundaries ==
The constituency encompasses Kalia Upazila and five union parishads of Narail Sadar Upazila: Bhadrabila, Bichhali, Kalora, Shaikhati, and Singasolpur.

== History ==
The constituency was created in 1984 from a Jessore constituency when the former Jessore District was split into four districts: Jhenaidah, Jessore, Magura, and Narail.

== Members of Parliament ==
Election	Member	Party	Term	Notes
1986	SM Abu Sayeed	Jatiya Party	1986–1990	
1991	Dhirendra Nath Saha	Awami League	1991–1996	
Feb 1996	Monirul Islam Tipu	BNP	Feb–Jun 1996	
Jun 1996	Dhirendra Nath Saha	Awami League	1996–2001	
2002 by-election	Dhirendra Nath Saha	BNP	2002–2006	
2008	Kabirul Haque Mukti	Independent	2009–2014	
2014	Kabirul Haque Mukti	Awami League	2014–2018	
2018	Kabirul Haque Mukti	Awami League	2019–2024	
2026	Biswas Jahangir Alam	BNP	2026–present	

== Elections ==
=== Elections in the 2020s ===
General election 2026: Narail-1
Party	Candidate	Votes	%	±%
BNP	Biswas Jahangir Alam	99,975		
Jamaat	Md Obaidullah	75,225		
Independent	B M Nagib Hosen			
IAB	Abdul Aziz			
National Party (Bangladesh)	Md Milton Mollah			
Independent	Sukesh Saha Ananda			
Independent	Md Ujjal Molla			
Independent	S M Sazzad Hossain			
Majority		24,750		
Turnout				

=== Elections in the 2010s ===
Kabirul Haque Mukti was re-elected unopposed in the 2014 general election after opposition parties withdrew their candidacies in a boycott of the election.

=== Elections in the 2000s ===
General Election 2008: Narail-1
Party	Candidate	Votes	%	±%
Independent	Kabirul Haque Mukti	63,826	39.5	N/A
BNP	Biswas Jahangir Alam	50,777	31.4	−42.6
AL	Bimal Biswas	43,295	26.8	N/A
IAB	Md. Ayub Hossain Mina	3,822	2.4	N/A
Independent	Dhirendra Nath Shah	63	0.0	N/A
Majority		13,049	8.1	−41.0
Turnout		161,783	88.4	+41.8
Independent gain from BNP				

Sheikh Hasina stood for five seats in the October 2001 general election: Rangpur-6, Narail-1, Narail-2, Barguna-3, and Gopalganj-3. After winning all but Rangpur-6, she chose to represent Gopalganj-3 and quit the other three, triggering by-elections in them. Dhirendra Nath Shah of the BNP was elected in a January 2002 by-election.

Narail-1 by-election, January 2002
Party	Candidate	Votes	%	±%
BNP	Dhirendra Nath Shah	63,896	74.0	+19.4
AL	M. Azizul Haque	21,530	24.9	−29.7
JP(E)	AKM Quamruzzaman	917	1.1	N/A
Majority		42,366	49.1	+37.4
Turnout		86,343	46.6	−27.1
BNP gain from AL				

General Election 2001: Narail-1
Party	Candidate	Votes	%	±%
AL	Sheikh Hasina	78,216	54.6	+8.5
BNP	Dhirendra Nath Saha	61,413	42.9	+18.6
IJOF	Sharif Munir Hossain	2,741	1.9	N/A
WPB	Md. Nazrul Islam	401	0.3	N/A
BKA	A. Quddus Sheikh	237	0.2	N/A
Independent	Md. Lutfar Rahman Sarder	78	0.1	N/A
Jatiya Party (M)	Ishtiaq Hossain Shikder	38	0.0	N/A
Majority		16,803	11.7	−10.1
Turnout		143,124	76.2	+1.5
AL hold				

=== Elections in the 1990s ===
General Election June 1996: Narail-1
Party	Candidate	Votes	%	±%
AL	Dhirendra Nath Saha	51,167	46.1	+0.2
BNP	Biswash Jahangir Alam	26,948	24.3	−0.6
JP(E)	Gazi Asraf Ul Alam	18,622	16.8	+16.0
Jamaat	M. H. Bahauddin	7,389	6.7	+0.9
IOJ	Siraj Khan	5,094	4.6	+0.1
JSD	Sharif Nurul Ambia	1,228	1.1	−0.4
Gano Forum	Tariqul Islam	394	0.4	N/A
Independent	Munshi Ruhul Kuddus	141	0.1	N/A
Jatiya Janata Party (Asad)	Md. Ashiqul Alam	41	0.0	N/A
Majority		24,219	21.8	+0.8
Turnout		111,024	74.7	+19.5
AL hold				

General Election 1991: Narail-1
Party	Candidate	Votes	%	±%
AL	Dhirendra Nath Saha	47,158	45.9	
BNP	Gautam Mitra	25,604	24.9	
Independent	Gazi Asraf Ul Alam	13,533	13.2	
Jamaat	S. Md. Faruk Ahmmad	5,913	5.8	
IOJ	Maulana Shahadat	4,664	4.5	
Independent	Shahdat	2,398	2.3	
JSD	Sharif Nurul Ambia	1,503	1.5	
JP(E)	SM Abu Sayeed	824	0.8	
Bangladesh Hindu League	Gobinda	384	0.4	
Jatiya Samajtantrik Dal-JSD	Zamir Hossain	382	0.4	
Zaker Party	Md. Delwar Hossain	213	0.2	
Independent	Tofiqur Rahman	182	0.2	
Majority		21,554	21.0	
Turnout		102,758	55.2	
AL gain from JP(E)				
