= Joynagar =

Joynagar may refer to:

- Joynagar Mojilpur, a city of the South 24 Parganas district in the Indian state of West Bengal
- Joynagar Mojilpur Municipality, a municipal corporation of the South 24 Parganas district in the Indian state of West Bengal
- Joynagar Mojilpur railway station, a railway station of the South 24 Parganas district in the Indian state of West Bengal
- Joynagar I, a community development block of the South 24 Parganas district in the Indian state of West Bengal
- Joynagar II, a community development block of the South 24 Parganas district in the Indian state of West Bengal
- Joynagar (Vidhan Sabha constituency), a legislative assembly constituency of the South 24 Parganas district in the Indian state of West Bengal
- Joynagar (Lok Sabha constituency), a parliamentary constituency of the South 24 Parganas district in the Indian state of West Bengal
- Joynagar Institution, a government-sponsored high school of the South 24 Parganas district in the Indian state of West Bengal
- Joynagarer moa, a very famous confectionery of the South 24 Parganas district in the Indian state of West Bengal
- Joynagar, Agartala, a neighbourhood of the Agartala district in the Indian state of Tripura
- Joynagar, West Tripura, a town of the West Tripura district in the Indian state of Tripura
- Joynagar Union, a town of the Satkhira district in the Bangladesh
- Joynagar Union, Kalia, a town of the Narail district in the Bangladesh
