= Narail Zamindar Bari =

Historic residence in Narail District, Bangladesh

Narail Zamindar Bari নড়াইল জমিদার বাড়ি
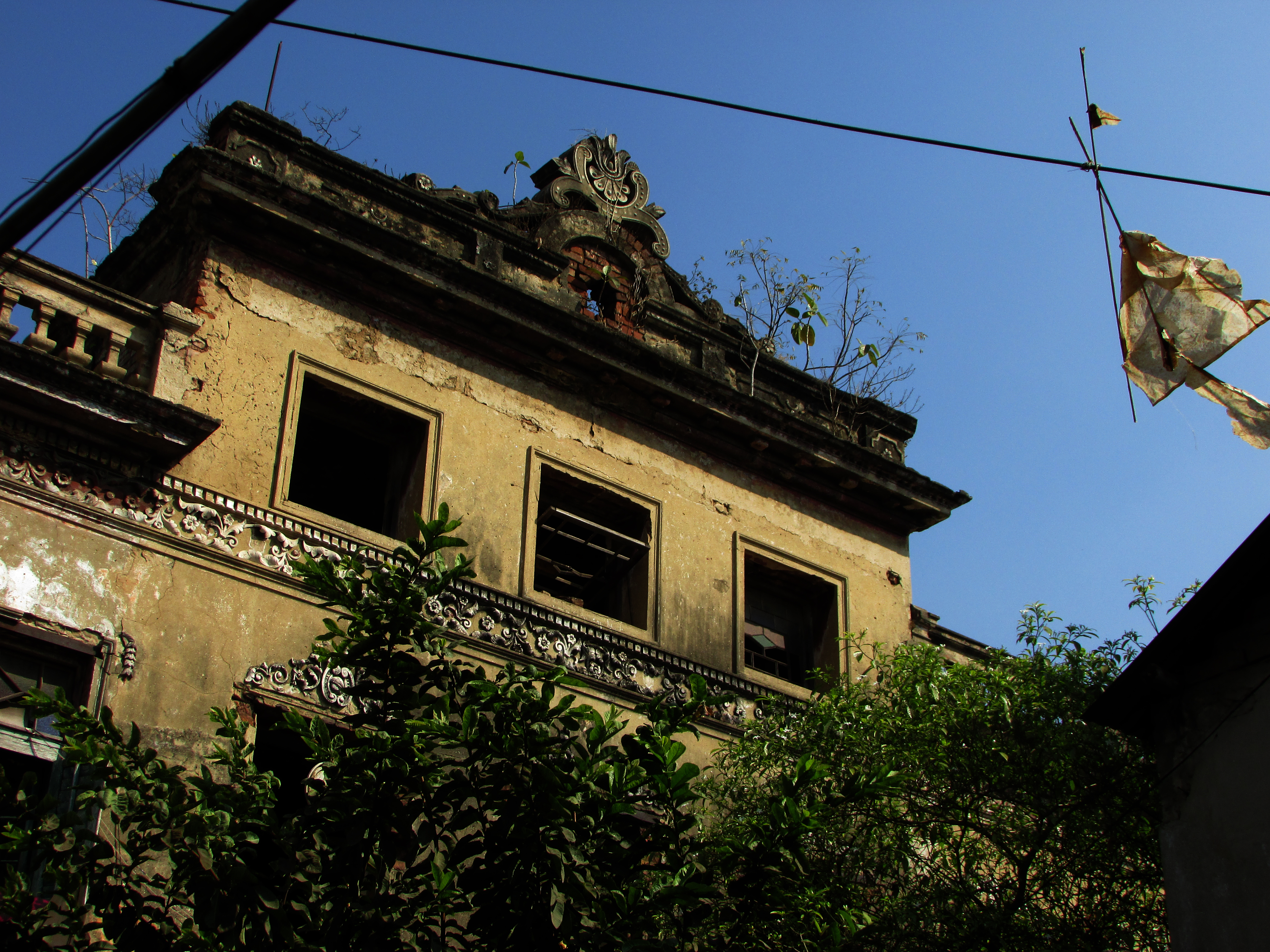
- Narail House, Cossipore branch, Calcutta
- Country: Bangladesh
- Founder: Babu Kali Shankar Ray (Roy)

Narail Zamindar Bari is a historic zamindari residence located in the Narail of Narail Sadar Upazila, in the Narail District of Bangladesh.

== History ==
The Narail Zamindar lineage began in 1791 under the leadership of Rupram Ray. At that time, the estate functioned as a taluqdari (a subordinate landholding) under the zamindari of Rani Bhabani of Natore. However, it was Rupram Ray’s son, Kali Shankar Ray, who transitioned the family from taluqdars to independent zamindars. As a result, Kali Shankar Ray is widely regarded as the principal founder of the Narail Zamindar dynasty. Both Kali Shankar Ray and his father served as officials under the royal estate of Natore. In 1793, when British Governor Lord Cornwallis introduced the Permanent Settlement system in Bengal, many of Rani Bhabani's lands, burdened with unpaid revenue, were auctioned off — paving the way for independent zamindaris like Narail to emerge. Taking advantage of the situation, Kali Shankar Ray, the official under Rani Bhabani of Natore, began purchasing auctioned zamindari lands. Thus, he established his independent estate with Narail as its administrative headquarters. Later, the granddaughters of Zamindar Kali Shankar became wealthy by engaging in the indigo trade. Over time, the descendants of this zamindar family played a significant role in education and regional development. The final chapter of the Narail Zamindari came with the Partition of India in 1947, after which the family relocated to Calcutta. A few members of the family returned briefly in 1950 and 1952, just before the abolition of the zamindari system, but eventually left again. Since then, the estate was abandoned, marking the end of the zamindar lineage in Narail. The Narail Zamindar estate spanned a vast area and included numerous residential buildings, a theatre stage for entertainment, a temple and Durga Puja pavilion for religious worship, a revenue office (kachharibari) for tax collection, several ponds and large tanks, as well as fruit orchards and gardens.

== Current condition ==
Due to prolonged neglect and lack of preservation efforts, the majority of the original structures of the zamindar estate have deteriorated significantly or collapsed. While a few remnants of the architecture still stand, they too are in a dilapidated condition and face the threat of imminent ruin.
