= SM Abu Sayeed =

Bangladeshi politician

Member of Parliament from Narail-1
- In office 1986–1990
- Preceded by: Seats start
- Succeeded by: Dhirendra Nath Saha

Personal details
- Born: 1 January 1937 Narail District
- Died: 28 August 2017 (aged 80) Narail Sadar Hospital, Narail
- Party: Jatiya Party (Ershad)
- Other political affiliations: Bangladesh Awami League

SM Abu Sayeed (1 January 1937 – 28 August 2017) is a Jatiya Party (Ershad) politician and the former member of parliament for Narail-1. He was the organizer of the Liberation War of Bangladesh.

== Early life ==
SM Abu Sayeed was born on 1 January 1937 in Narail District.

== Career ==
Sayeed was the principal of Khulna Daulatpur Diba Nishi College and Shaheed Abdus Salam Degree College. He left the Awami League in 1984 and joined the Jatiya Party. He was the chairman of Kalia Upazila Parishad. He was the chairman of Narail district council. He was elected to parliament from Narail-1 as a Jatiya Party candidate in 1986 and 1988. In 1996, he rejoined the Awami League and was elected president of the Narail District Krishak League.

== Death ==
SM Abu Sayeed died on 28 August 2017.
