= Babra Hasla Union =

Babra Hasla Union বাবরা হাচলা ইউনিয়ন
- Union
- Babra Hasla Union
- Country: Bangladesh
- Division: Khulna
- District: Narail
- Upazila: Kalia Upazila

Area
  - Total: 46.62 km^{2} (18.00 sq mi)

Population (2011)
  - Total: 24,193
  - Density: 518.9/km^{2} (1,344/sq mi)
- Time zone: UTC+6 (BST)
- Website: babrahaslaup.narail.gov.bd

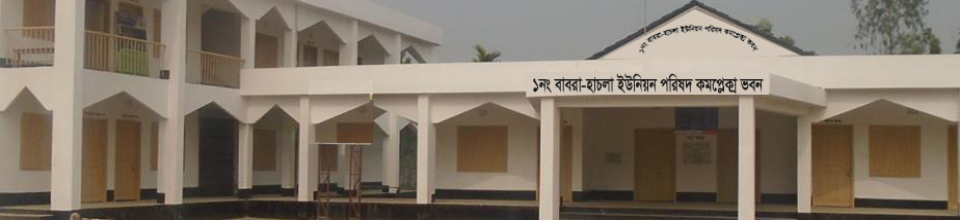

Babra Hasla Union (Bengali: বাবরা হাচলা ইউনিয়ন) is a Union Parishad under Lohagara Upazila of Narail District in Khulna Division, Bangladesh. It has an area of 46.62 km2 (18.00 sq mi) and a population of 24,193.
