= Purulia Union =

Purulia Union পুরুলিয়া ইউনিয়ন
- Union
- Purulia Union
- Country: Bangladesh
- Division: Khulna
- District: Bagerhat
- Upazila: Kalia Upazila

Area
  - Total: 70.39 km^{2} (27.18 sq mi)

Population (2011)
  - Total: 23,593
  - Density: 335.2/km^{2} (868.1/sq mi)
- Time zone: UTC+6 (BST)
- Website: puruliaup.narail.gov.bd

Purulia Union (Bengali: পুরুলিয়া ইউনিয়ন) is a Union Parishad under Lohagara Upazila of Narail District in Khulna Division, Bangladesh. It has an area of 70.39 km2 (27.18 sq mi) and a population of 23,593 (2011).
