= Chanchuri Union =

Chanchuri Union চাঁচুড়ী ইউনিয়ন
- Union
- Chanchuri Union
- Country: Bangladesh
- Division: Khulna
- District: Bagerhat
- Upazila: Kalia Upazila

Area
  - Total: 58.59 km^{2} (22.62 sq mi)

Population (2011)
  - Total: 15,285
  - Density: 260.9/km^{2} (675.7/sq mi)
- Time zone: UTC+6 (BST)
- Website: chacuriup.narail.gov.bd

Chanchuri Union (Bengali: চাঁচুড়ী ইউনিয়ন) is a Union Parishad under Lohagara Upazila of Narail District, in Khulna Division, Bangladesh. It has an area of 46.62 km2 (18.00 sq mi) and a population of 15,285.
