= Perali Union =

Perali Union পেড়লী ইউনিয়ন
- Union
- Perali Union
- Country: Bangladesh
- Division: Khulna
- District: Bagerhat
- Upazila: Kalia Upazila

Area
  - Total: 56.67 km^{2} (21.88 sq mi)

Population (2011)
  - Total: 32,112
  - Density: 566.6/km^{2} (1,468/sq mi)
- Time zone: UTC+6 (BST)
- Website: peroliup.narail.gov.bd

Perali Union (Bengali: পেড়লী ইউনিয়ন) is a Union Parishad in Lohagara Upazila of Narail District, Khulna Division, Bangladesh. It has an area of 56.67 km2 (21.88 sq mi) and a population of 32,112 (2011).
