= Khasial Union =

Khasial Union খাশিয়াল ইউনিয়ন
- Union
- Khasial Union
- Country: Bangladesh
- Division: Khulna
- District: Bagerhat
- Upazila: Kalia Upazila

Area
  - Total: 88.87 km^{2} (34.31 sq mi)

Population (2011)
  - Total: 19,211
  - Density: 216.2/km^{2} (559.9/sq mi)
- Time zone: UTC+6 (BST)
- Website: khashialup.narail.gov.bd

Khasial Union (Bengali: খাশিয়াল ইউনিয়ন) is a Union Parishad under Lohagara Upazila of Narail District in the division of Khulna, Bangladesh. It has an area of 88.87 km2 (34.31 sq mi) and a population of 19,211.
