= Monirul Islam Tipu =

Bangladeshi politician

- মনিরুল ইসলাম টিপু

Member of Parliament for Narail-1
- In office 15 February 1996 – 12 June 1996
- Preceded by: Dhirendra Nath Saha
- Succeeded by: Dhirendra Nath Saha

Personal details
- Born: SM Monirul Islam Tipu c. 1956 Narail District
- Died: 26 March 2021
- Party: Bangladesh Nationalist Party
- Education: Sir Salimullah Medical College

Monirul Islam Tipu (c. 1956 - 26 March 2021) Politician of Narail District of Bangladesh and former member of Parliament for Narail-1 constituency in February 1996.

== Career ==
Monirul Islam Tipu is the general secretary of Narail district BNP. He was elected to parliament from Narail-1 as a Bangladesh Nationalist Party candidate in 15 February 1996 Bangladeshi general election.
