= Jalalabad Union, Gopalganj Sadar =

Jalalabad জালালাবাদ ইউনিয়ন
- Union Council
- Jalalabad Union Council
- Country: Bangladesh
- Division: Dhaka Division
- District: Gopalganj District
- Upazila: Gopalganj Sadar Upazila
- Named for: Mollah Jalaluddin Ahmed

Government
  - Chairman: F. Mohammad Maruf Reza
  - MP (Gopalganj-2): K Muhammad Babar

Area
  - Total: 17.05 km^{2} (6.58 sq mi)

Population
  - Total: 15,257
  - Density: 894.8/km^{2} (2,318/sq mi)
- Demonym: Jalalabadi
- Time zone: UTC+6 (BST)
- Website: jalalabadup.gopalganj.gov.bd

Jalalabad Union (Bengali: জালালাবাদ ইউনিয়ন) is a Union Parishad under Gopalganj Sadar Upazila of Gopalganj District in the Dhaka Division of Bangladesh. It has an area of 17.05 square kilometres and a population of 15,257.

== Geography ==
Jalalabad Union borders Itna Union (Lohagara Upazila) in the north, Shuktail Union and Gopinathpur Union in the east and Gorai-Madhumati River to its west and south. It has an area of 17.05 square kilometres.

== History ==
It was named to Jalalabad in honor of the Mollah Jalaluddin Ahmed from Barfa village.

== Demography ==
Jalalabad has a population of 15,257.

== Administration ==
Jalalabad Union contains 16 villages contained into ten mouzas and nine wards. The villages are:

1. Dhubashi
2. Char Dhalaitala
3. Ghaga Dhalaitala
4. Isakhali
5. Chhotafa
6. Barafa
7. Char Barafa
8. Khalia
9. West Shuktail
10. Ghenashur
11. Durgapur
12. Tetulia
13. Bara Panchuria
14. Chhota Panchuria
15. Matla
16. Mirarchar

== Chairmen ==
Number	Name	Term
০১।	Muhammad Ishaq Mina	23-10-1973 হতে 28-02-1977
০২।	Mollah Nazir Ahmad	28-02-1977 হতে 09-02-1984
০৩।	Sheikh Belayet Hossain	04-02-1984 হতে 22-06-1989
০৪।	Mina Mujibur Rahman	22-06-1989 হতে 29-11-1992
০৫।	Mollah Moslem Uddin	29-11-1992 হতে 19-02-1998
০৬।	Mina Mujibur Rahman	19-02-198 হতে 29-03-2003
০৭।	Mollah Hemayet Uddin	29-03-2003 হতে 02-08-2011
০৮।	Muhammad Suparul Alam Tike	02-08-2011 হতে 03-08-2016
০৯।	Muhammad Suparul Alam Tike	03-08-2016 হতে 07-02-2022
১০।	F. Muhammad Maruf Reza	07-02-2022 হতে Present
