= Mauli Union =

Mauli Union মাউলী ইউনিয়ন
- Union
- Mauli Union
- Country: Bangladesh
- Division: Khulna
- District: Bagerhat
- Upazila: Kalia Upazila

Area
  - Total: 103.6 km^{2} (40.0 sq mi)

Population (1991)
  - Total: 15,888
  - Density: 153.4/km^{2} (397.2/sq mi)
- Time zone: UTC+6 (BST)
- Website: mauliup.narail.gov.bd

Mauli Union (Bengali: মাউলী ইউনিয়ন) is a Union Parishad in Lohagara Upazila of Narail District, Khulna Division, Bangladesh. It has an area of 103.6 km2 (40.0 sq mi) and a population of 15,888.
