= Naldi =

Naldi is an Italian surname. Notable people with the surname include:

- Giuseppe Naldi (1770–1821), Italian operatic tenor
- Léo Naldi (born 2001), Brazilian footballer
- Neda Naldi (1913–1993), Italian theatrical
- Nita Naldi (1894–1961), American silent film actress
- Ronald Naldi, American lyric tenor

== See also ==
- Naldi Union, place in Bangladesh
