= Panchgram Union =

Panchgram Union পাঁচগ্রাম ইউনিয়ন
- Union
- Panchgram Union
- Country: Bangladesh
- Division: Khulna
- District: Bagerhat
- Upazila: Kalia Upazila

Area
  - Total: 51.80 km^{2} (20.00 sq mi)

Population (2011)
  - Total: 18,315
  - Density: 353.6/km^{2} (915.7/sq mi)
- Time zone: UTC+6 (BST)
- Website: panchgramup.narail.gov.bd

Panchgram Union (Bengali: পাঁচগ্রাম ইউনিয়ন) is a Union Parishad under Lohagara Upazila of Narail District in the division of Khulna, Bangladesh. It has an area of 51.80 km2 (20.00 sq mi) and a population of 18,315 (2011).
