= Afra River =

River in southwest Bangladesh

Coordinates: 23.1635°N 89.4096°E

- Native name: আফ্রা নদী (Bengali)

Location
- Country: Bangladesh
- Bangladesh: Narail; Jessore

Physical characteristics
- Source
  - location: Chitra River
- Mouth
  - location: Bhairab River in Jashore District
- Length: 30 km (19 mi)
- Width
  - maximum: 50 m (160 ft)

Basin features
- River system: Ganges Delta

Afra River is a river of south-western Bangladesh. The river is 30 km long and its average width is 50 meter. The river flows from the Chitra River to the Bhairab River. The identification number of the Afra River given by the Bangladesh Water Development Board or "PWDB" is the River No. 5 in the Southwest Region.
