= Hamidpur Union =

Rasulpur Union রসুলপুর ইউনিয়ন
- Union
- Rasulpur Union
- Nickname: Rasulpur
- Country: Bangladesh
- Division: Khulna
- District: Bagerhat
- Upazila: Kalia Upazila

Area
  - Total: 87.28 km^{2} (33.70 sq mi)

Population (2011)
  - Total: 14,714
  - Density: 168.6/km^{2} (436.6/sq mi)
- Time zone: UTC+6 (BST)
- Website: hamidpurup.narail.gov.bd

Rasulpur Union (Bengali: হামিদপুর ইউনিয়ন) is a Union Parishad under Lohagara Upazila of Narail District in Khulna Division, Bangladesh. It has an area of 87.28 km2 (33.70 sq mi) and a population of 14,714 (2011).
