= Baioshona Union =

Baioshona Union বাঐসোনা ইউনিয়ন
- Union
- Baioshona Union
- Country: Bangladesh
- Division: Khulna
- District: Bagerhat
- Upazila: Kalia Upazila

Area
  - Total: 69.93 km^{2} (27.00 sq mi)

Population (2011)
  - Total: 20,414
  - Density: 291.9/km^{2} (756.1/sq mi)
- Time zone: UTC+6 (BST)
- Website: baioshonaup.narail.gov.bd

Baioshona Union (Bengali: বাঐসোনা ইউনিয়ন) is a Union Parishad under Lohagara Upazila of Narail District in the division of Khulna, Bangladesh. It has an area of 69.93 km2 (27.00 sq mi and a population of 20,414 (2011).
