= Pahardanga Union =

Pahardanga Union পহরডাঙ্গা ইউনিয়ন
- Union
- Pahardanga Union
- Country: Bangladesh
- Division: Khulna
- District: Narail
- Upazila: Kalia Upazila

Area
  - Total: 49.05 km^{2} (18.94 sq mi)

Population (2011)
  - Total: 12,653
  - Density: 258.0/km^{2} (668.1/sq mi)
- Time zone: UTC+6 (BST)
- Website: pahordangaup.narail.gov.bd

Pahardanga Union (Bengali: পহরডাঙ্গা ইউনিয়ন) is a Union Parishad under Kalia Upazila of Narail District in Khulna Division, Bangladesh. It has an area of 49.05 km2 (18.94 sq mi) and a population of 12,653.
