= Nihar Ranjan Gupta's house =

Historic house in Bangladesh

Coordinates: 23°09′23″N 89°41′29″E

Nihar Ranjan Gupta's House
- নীহাররঞ্জন গুপ্তের বাড়ি (Bengali)
- Interactive map of Nihar Ranjan Gupta's House
- Location: Lohagara Upazila

History
- Built for: Residence
- Rebuilt: 2003

Site notes
- Area: Narail District
- Architectural style: British
- Owner: Department of Archaeology

Nihar Ranjan Gupta's house, located in Narail district, Bangladesh, is an archaeological monument of Bangladesh. It is the ancestral home of Bengali novelist, Nihar Ranjan Gupta. The house is 10 kilometers from Lohagara Upazila. In 2003, the BNP—Jamaat government declared the residence as a preserved antiquity.

== Location ==
It is situated in Itna village, 5.5 kilometers southeast of Lohagara, west of Itna Bazaar, an earthen road leads towards Itna Girls' School, turning half a kilometer eastward. Following this road 200 meters north, the house is located in front of an unpaved road.

== History ==
Nihar Ranjan Gupta was born on June 6, 1911, in Kolkata, India, where his father was employed. But his ancestral home was in Itna village of Lohagara Upazila in Narail district of Bangladesh. He died in Kolkata on January 20, 1986, due to a heart attack.

Until 1990, Itna Government Primary School operated in this house. On November 24, 1993, Itna artist Ali Azgar Raja and teacher Narayan Chandra Biswas established "Shishu Swarga-2" in this house. The initiative was inaugurated by Bengali artist S. M. Sultan.

== Infrastructure ==
The house is situated on approximately seventy shatak of land. It consists of a two-story building, a pond, and various trees. The northern section of the house is two-storied, while the southern section is single-storied. There are two entrances on either side of the house.

The ground floor of the building has seven rooms and a narrow veranda in the front. Multiple entrances lead from the veranda into the interior rooms. In front of the veranda, there are decorative segmental arch-supported columns. The only staircase to the second floor is located at the northeastern corner of the building.

The northern two-story section contains three rooms arranged from east to west, along with a long veranda. In front of this veranda, there are segmental arch-supported columns. Almost every room on both floors features multiple niches and built-in wall cabinets. The doors and window shutters are adorned with floral and vine motifs, and the wall cabinets are made of wood.

The name "Ananda Kutir" is inscribed in Bengali on the wall of the ground floor veranda. To the left of the entrance to the second floor, there is a temple.

Built during the British colonial period, the house follows a simple architectural style. The construction materials include bricks and lime mortar, with wooden beams used in the roof. Along the roofline, there is a cornice decorated with intricate geometric patterns.
