= Narail Sadar Upazila =

Narail Sadar নড়াইল সদর
- Upazila
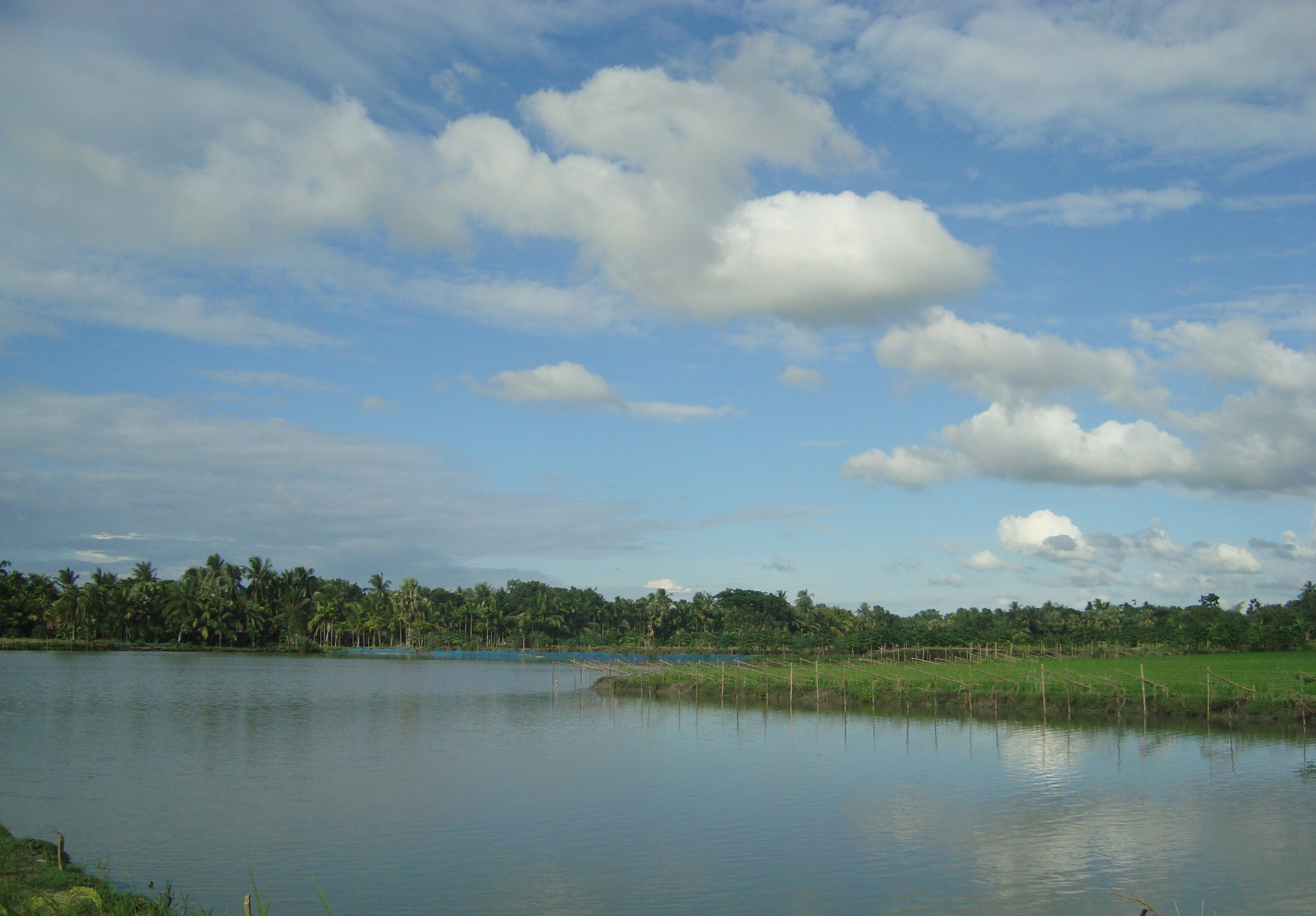
- Pond in village Sheikhati

- Coordinates: 23°10′N 89°30′E
- Country: Bangladesh
- Division: Khulna
- District: Narail
- Headquarters: Narail

Area
  - Total: 381.75 km^{2} (147.39 sq mi)

Population (2022)
  - Total: 297,068
  - Density: 778.17/km^{2} (2,015.5/sq mi)
- Time zone: UTC+6 (BST)
- Postal code: 7500
- Area code: 0481
- Website: narailsadar.narail.gov.bd(in Bengali)

Narail Sadar Upazila mauza geocode map

Narail Sadar (Bengali: নড়াইল সদর) is an upazila of Narail District in the Division of Khulna, Bangladesh. Narail Thana was established in 1861 and was converted into an upazila (a sub-district) in 1984. The upazila takes its name from the district and the Bengali word sadar (headquarters). It is the subdistrict where the district headquarters, Narail town, is located.

== Geography ==
Narail Sadar Upazila has a total area of 381.75 square kilometres (147.39 sq mi). It borders Magura District to the north, Lohagara Upazila to the north and east, Kalia Upazila to the southeast, and Jessore District to the south and west. The Chitra River flows south through the upazila.

== Demographics ==
Historical population
Year	Pop. (000)	±%
1981	220	—
1991	251	+14.1%
2001	269	+7.2%
2011	273	+1.5%
2022	297	+8.8%
Source: Bangladesh Bureau of Statistics

According to the 2022 Bangladeshi census, Narail Sadar Upazila had 74,564 households and a population of 297,068. 8.78% were under 5 years of age. Narail Sadar had a literacy rate of 75.95%: 78.13% for males and 73.89% for females, with a sex ratio of 95.53 males per 100 females. 78,592 (26.46%) lived in urban areas. Ethnic population is 3,936 (1.32%).

Religions in Narail Sadar Upazila (2022)
Religion	Percent
Islam	76.56%
Hinduism	23.37%
Other or not stated	0.07%

Population by religion in Union/Paurashava
Union/Paurashava	Muslim	Hindu	Others
Narail Paurashava	41,240	11,697	37
Auria Union	22,552	3,080	0
Banshgram Union	16,433	2,335	0
Bhadrabila Union	17,124	2,252	1
Bisali Union	16,413	4,496	2
Chandiborpur Union	16,356	2,539	19
Habokhali Union	18,236	1,527	3
Kalora Union	10,943	8,976	19
Maijpara Union	17,300	5,344	10
Mulia Union	723	8,454	44
Shahabad Union	12,689	1,978	1
Sheikhati Union	13,800	7,132	39
Singasholpur Union	11,216	4,601	1
Tularampur Union	12,398	5,025	9

🟩 Muslim majority 🟧 Hindu majority

As of the 2011 Census of Bangladesh, Narail Sadar upazila had 62,795 households and a population of 272,872. 57,133 (20.94%) inhabitants were under 10 years of age. Narail Sadar had an average literacy rate of 65.52%, compared to the national average of 51.8%, and a sex ratio of 1021 females per 1000 males. 51,318 (18.81%) of the population lived in urban areas.

== Arts and culture ==
A weeklong festival is held in Narail town in memory of artist SM Sultan every year in January or February. Past events have included an art competition, art exhibition, music, bull fight, horse race, lathi khela, and wrestling. Shorter commemorations are held in August and October, around the anniversaries of his birth and death.

=== Museums ===
The SM Sultan Memorial Museum has 13 original Sultan artworks and digital prints of 28 others.

== Administration ==
Narail Sadar Upazila is divided into Narail Municipality and 13 union parishads: Auria, Banshgram, Bhadrabila, Bisali, Chandiborpur, Habokhali, Kalora, Maijpara, Mulia, Shahabad, Sheikhati, Singasholpur, and Tularampur. The union parishads are subdivided into 180 mauzas and 231 villages.

Narail Municipality is subdivided into 9 wards and 24 mahallas.

== Transport ==
The town of Narail is the road transport hub of the district. From Madhumati Bridge at the east to west it is connected by National highway N806 to Jessore, about 56 kilometres (35 mi) highway pass through the district. R720 runs north 50 kilometres (31 mi) to Magura. Within the district.

== Education ==
There are 16 colleges in the upazila. They include Abdul Hye City College, Maij Para College, and Mirzapur United College. Narail Government Victoria College, founded in 1886, is the only honors level one.

According to Banglapedia, Narail Government High School, founded in 1903, is a notable secondary school.

The madrasa education system includes one fazil and one kamil madrasa.

== Notable residents ==
- Saroj Dutta, communist activist and writer, was born in Narail in 1914 and attended Victoria Collegiate School there.
- Mashrafe Mortaza, cricketer and current captain of the Bangladesh national cricket team was born in Narail in 1983.
- Suvra Mukherjee, First Lady of India, was born in Bhadrabila village and attended primary school in Narail.
- Bijoy Sarkar, poet, baul singer, lyricist, and composer, was born in Dumdi village in 1903.
- SM Sultan, artist, was born in Machimdia village in 1923 and lived most of his life in Narail.

== See also ==
- Upazilas of Bangladesh
- Districts of Bangladesh
- Divisions of Bangladesh
