= Boronal Eliasabad Union =

Boronal Eliasabad Union বড়নাল ইলিয়াছাবাদ ইউনিয়ন
- Union
- Boronal Eliasabad Union
- Country: Bangladesh
- Division: Khulna
- District: Bagerhat
- Upazila: Kalia Upazila

Area
  - Total: 36.99 km^{2} (14.28 sq mi)

Population (2011)
  - Total: 8,835
  - Density: 238.8/km^{2} (618.6/sq mi)
- Time zone: UTC+6 (BST)
- Website: boronaleliasabadup.narail.gov.bd

Boronal Eliasabad Union (Bengali: বড়নাল ইলিয়াছাবাদ ইউনিয়ন) is a Union Parishad under Lohagara Upazila of Narail District in the division of Khulna, Bangladesh. It has an area of 36.99 km2 (14.28 sq mi) and a population of 8,835.
