= Durvazury =

Coordinates: 23.1615°N 89.4569°E

Durvazury is a village in Narail Sadar Upazila, Narail District, Khulna Division, in south-west Bangladesh.
