= Itna =

Itna may refer to:

- Itna Union, Bangladesh
- Itna Upazila, Bangladesh
