= Shalnagar Union =

Shalnagar Union শালনগর ইউনিয়ন
- Union
- Shalnagar Union
- Country: Bangladesh
- Division: Khulna
- District: Bagerhat
- Upazila: Lohagara Upazila
- Time zone: UTC+6 (BST)
- Website: salnagarup.narail.gov.bd

Shalnagar Union (Bengali: শালনগর ইউনিয়ন) is a Union Parishad under Lohagara Upazila of Narail District in Khulna Division, Bangladesh.
