= Sheikh Abdus Salam =

Sheikh Abdus Salam was a Bangla educationist who was killed in the Bangladesh Liberation War and is considered a martyr in Bangladesh.

== Early life ==
Salam was born in Bilbaoch, Kalia Union, Narail District on 12 July 1940. He graduated from Kalia High School in 1956. He graduated from Narail Victoria College in 1958 and from Brajalal College in 1960. In 1969, he started his M.A. from Dhaka University English Department. He was supposed to have completed the course in 1971 but it was postponed. He completed his Bachelor Legum Of Law from Khulna Law College and Bachelor in Education from Govt. Teachers Training College, Dhaka.

== Career ==
Salam started his career in 1960 at the Nawagram United Academy as the headmaster. He then joined the Benda Union Institution as the headmaster and in 1967 he became the headmaster of Kalia Multilateral High School. He helped organized the 1969 uprising in Narail, East Pakistan. He was the general secretary of the Kalia Union unit of Bangladesh Awami League. He led the raising of the first flag of Bangladesh in Narail for the first time. When Bangladesh Liberation war started he helped organize the Mukti Bahini in the area and he was the convener of Freedom Fighters Sangram Parishad in Kalia Union.

== Death and legacy ==
According to one source, Salam was arrested by Pakistan Army in the early May 1971. The same states that he was tortured in custody and executed on 13 May 1971. After the Independence of Bangladesh Kalia college was renamed to Shaheed Abdus Salam Degree College. On 14 December 1998, Bangladesh Post issued postal stamps with his image on the occasion of Martyred Intellectuals Day.
