= Lohagara Union =

Lohagara Union লোহাগড়া ইউনিয়ন
- Union
- Lohagara Union
- Country: Bangladesh
- Division: Khulna
- District: Narail
- Upazila: Lohagara Upazila

Area
  - Total: 25.90 km^{2} (10.00 sq mi)

Population (2011)
  - Total: 9,700
  - Density: 370/km^{2} (970/sq mi)
- Time zone: UTC+6 (BST)
- Website: lohagoraup.narail.gov.bd

Lohagara Union (Bengali: লোহাগড়া ইউনিয়ন) is a Union Parishad under Lohagara Upazila of Narail District, Khulna Division, Bangladesh. It has an area of 25.90 km2 (10.00 sq mi) and a population of 9,700.
