= Dighalia Union =

Dighalia Union may refer to:

- Dighalia Union, Khulna, a union in Dighalia Upazila
- Dighalia Union, Lohagara, a union in Lohagara Upazila
