= Kotakol Union =

Kotakol Union কোটাকোল ইউনিয়ন
- Union
- Kotakol Union
- Country: Bangladesh
- Division: Khulna
- District: Bagerhat
- Upazila: Lohagara Upazila

Area
  - Total: 28.10 km^{2} (10.85 sq mi)

Population (2011)
  - Total: 12,839
  - Density: 456.9/km^{2} (1,183/sq mi)
- Time zone: UTC+6 (BST)
- Website: kotakolup.narail.gov.bd

Kotakol Union (Bengali: কোটাকোল ইউনিয়ন) is a Union Parishad under Lohagara Upazila of Narail District in Khulna Division, Bangladesh. It has an area of 28.10 km2 (10.85 sq mi) and a population of 12,839.
