= Kashipur Union =

Kashipur Union may refer to:

- Kashipur Union, Lohagara, a union in Lohagara Upazila
- Kashipur Union, Narayanganj Sadar, a union in Narayanganj Sadar Upazila
