= Joypur Union, Lohagara =

Joypur Union জয়পুর ইউনিয়ন
- Union
- Joypur Union
- Country: Bangladesh
- Division: Khulna
- District: Bagerhat
- Upazila: Lohagara Upazila
- Time zone: UTC+6 (BST)
- Website: joypurup.narail.gov.bd

Joypur Union (Bengali: জয়পুর ইউনিয়ন) is a Union Parishad under Lohagara Upazila of Narail District in the Khulna Division, Bangladesh.
