= Joynagar Union =

Joynagar Union may refer to:

- Joynagar Union, Kalia, a union in Kalia Upazila
- Joynagar Union, Satkhira, a union in Kalaroa Upazila of Satkhira District
