= Jalalabad Union (disambiguation) =

Jalalabad Union may refer to:

- Jalalabad Union, Sylhet Sadar, a union in Sylhet Sadar Upazila
- Jalalabad Union, Gopalganj Sadar, a union in Gopalganj Sadar Upazila
- Jalalabad Union, Eidgaon, a union in Eidgaon Upazila
- Jalalabad Union, Kalaroa, a union in Kalaroa Upazila
