= Biswas Jahangir Alam =

Bangladeshi politician

- বিশ্বাস জাহাঙ্গীর আলম

Member of Parliament
- Incumbent
- Assumed office 13 February 2026
- Preceded by: Md. Kabirul Haque
- Constituency: Narail-1

President, Narail District Bangladesh Nationalist Party
- Incumbent
- Assumed office 17 February 2025

Personal details
- Profession: Politician

Biswas Jahangir Alam (Bengali: বিশ্বাস জাহাঙ্গীর আলম) is a Bangladeshi politician who serves as Member of Parliament for Narail-1 constituency and as President of Narail District unit of Bangladesh Nationalist Party. He was elected to the Jatiya Sangsad in 13th national parliamentary election held on 13 February 2026.

== Political career ==
Alam is a veteran leader of Bangladesh Nationalist Party (BNP). At the party's biennial conference held in February 2025, he was elected president of the Narail District BNP, winning a majority of votes in a district‑wide election of party delegates.

In the election held on 13 February 2026, he won the Narail‑1 seat, receiving 99,975 votes, defeating his closest rival, candidate nominated by Bangladesh Jamaat‑e‑Islami.

== Office responsibilities ==
As President of the Narail District BNP, Jahangir Alam has overseen grassroots party activities, mobilized members for political campaigns, and represented the district party unit at national events and organizational meetings. His role includes coordinating with the party's central leadership and addressing local political concerns.

== See also ==
- Narail-1
- Bangladesh Nationalist Party
