= Salamabad Union =

Salamabad Union সালামাবাদ ইউনিয়ন
- Union
- Salamabad Union
- Country: Bangladesh
- Division: Khulna
- District: Narail
- Upazila: Kalia Upazila
- Established: 1977

Government
  - Upazila Chairman: Mullah Mahbubur Rahman

Area
  - Total: 59.23 km^{2} (22.87 sq mi)

Population (2011)
  - Total: 12,468
  - Density: 210.5/km^{2} (545.2/sq mi)
- Demonym: Salamabadi
- Time zone: UTC+6 (BST)
- Website: salamabadup.narail.gov.bd

Salamabad Union (Bengali: সালামাবাদ ইউনিয়ন) is a union parishad under Kalia Upazila of Narail District in Khulna Division, Bangladesh. It has an area of 59.23 km2 (22.87 sq mi) and a population of 12,468 (2011).

== Geography ==
Salamabad Union is located in the Kalia Upazila. It has an area of 59.23 km2 (22.87 sq mi).

== Demography ==
Salamabad has a population of 12,468.

== Administration ==
Salamabad constitutes the no. 5 union council of Kalia Upazila. It consists of four mouzas: Brihachla, Great Kalia, Devipur and Dhusahati. In total, it has 17 villages which are divided by 9 wards: Salamabad (Baka), Jaipur, Munshinagar, Bahirdanga, Haridanga, Boladanga, Naldanga, Dashnaora, Bilbyaoch, Devipur, Joka, Jokarchar, Vaidyavati, Bhaurirchar, Dhusahati, Raipur and Harishpur.

=== List of chairmen ===
List of chairmen
Name	Notes
MM Najmul Haq Prince	Previous
Mullah Mahbubur Rahman	Present

== Education and economy ==
The union has a literacy rate of 60%. It has 13 primary schools and 1 middle school. There are several madrasas: Bahirdanga Madrasa (Ward 1), Haridanga Women's Madrasa (Ward 3) and Ashraful Uloom Qawmia Madrasa & Orphanage, Baka.

== Language and culture ==
The native population converse in their native dialect but can also converse in Standard Bengali. Languages such as Arabic and English are also taught in schools. The union contains 20 mosques and several eidgahs: They are as follows:

=== List of mosques ===
List of mosques
Name	Imam
Char Jaipur Bayt al-Mamur Jame Mosque	Muhammad Ubaydul Sardar
Muhammadpur Jame Mosque, Jaipur	Muhammad Anisur Rahman
Jaipur Jame Mosque	Muhammad Musharraf Husayn
East Jokarchar Jame Mosque	Abu Talib Khan
West Jokarchar Jame Mosque	Muhammad Moinul Islam Mullah
Dhusahati Jame Mosque	Muhammad Nasrullah
East Dhusahati Jame Mosque	Muhammad Sirajul Islam
South Naldanga Jame Mosque	Muhammad Shariful Islam
West Baka Jame Mosque	Masrurul Haq Shiqdar
Middle Baka Jame Mosque	Muhammad Badshah Mia
Baka Madrasa Mosque	Muhammad Riyazul Islam
Bayt al-Nur Jame Mosque	Muhammad Mafizur Rahman
Bahirdanga Jame Mosque	Muhammad Hadiur Rahman
South Bahirdanga Jame Mosque	Muhammad Ghulam Kibriya Sharif
Middle Bilbyaoch Jame Mosque	Shoriful Islam
Bhaurirchar Jame Mosque	Muhammad Matiyar Rahman
Raipur-Ghazipara Jame Mosque	Muhammad Khwaja Mia
