= Lahuria Union =

Lahuria Union লাহুড়িয়া ইউনিয়ন
- Union
- Lahuria Union
- Country: Bangladesh
- Division: Khulna
- District: Bagerhat
- Upazila: Lohagara Upazila

Area
  - Total: 46.62 km^{2} (18.00 sq mi)

Population (2011)
  - Total: 24,193
  - Density: 518.9/km^{2} (1,344/sq mi)
- Time zone: UTC+6 (BST)
- Website: lahuriaup.narail.gov.bd

Lahuria Union (Bengali: লাহুড়িয়া ইউনিয়ন) is a Union Parishad in Lohagara Upazila of Narail District, Khulna Division, Bangladesh. It has an area of 46.62 km2 (18.00 sq mi) and a population of 24,193 (2011).
