= Noagram Union =

Noagram Union নোয়াগ্রাম ইউনিয়ন
- Union
- Noagram Union
- Country: Bangladesh
- Division: Khulna
- District: Bagerhat
- Upazila: Lohagara Upazila
- Established: 2016

Area
  - Total: 30.26 km^{2} (11.68 sq mi)

Population (2011)
  - Total: 16,563
  - Density: 547.4/km^{2} (1,418/sq mi)
- Time zone: UTC+6 (BST)
- Website: noagramup.narail.gov.bd

Noagram Union (Bengali: নোয়াগ্রাম ইউনিয়ন) is a Union Parishad under Lohagara Upazila of Narail District in the division of Khulna, Bangladesh. It has an area of 30.26 km2 (11.68 sq mi) and a population of 16,563 (2011).
