= Kumar River =

River in Bangladesh

Coordinates: 23.7278°N 89.1195°E

The Kumar (Bengali: কুমার নদী) is a river in south-western Bangladesh.

== Course ==
The Kumar River takes off from the Mathabhanga River at Hatboalia and follows a circuitous course to the east and south-east, for a long distance forming the boundary between Kushtia District to the north and Alamdanga Upazila of Chuadanga District and Harinakunda Upazila of Jhenaidah District to the south. Finally it joins the Nabaganga River near Magura town.

The other two branch rivers which take off from the Mathabhanga and are among the principal water courses both for communication and natural irrigation, are the Nabaganga River and the Chitra River. The remains of old flourishing villages and Indigo Planters' Kathibary (factory house) on the silted up course still mark their past importance. The dry beds of these two channels, like that of the course of the Bhairab, are still shown in the survey maps of Bangladesh.
