= Kalabaria Union =

Kalabaria Union কলাবাড়ীয়া ইউনিয়ন
- Union
- Kalabaria Union
- Country: Bangladesh
- Division: Khulna
- District: Narail
- Upazila: Kalia Upazila

Area
  - Total: 64.33 km^{2} (24.84 sq mi)

Population (2011)
  - Total: 31,747
  - Density: 493.5/km^{2} (1,278/sq mi)
- Time zone: UTC+6 (BST)
- Website: kalabariaup.narail.gov.bd

Kalabaria Union (Bengali: কলাবাড়ীয়া ইউনিয়ন) is a Union Parishad under Kalia Upazila of Narail District in Khulna Division, Bangladesh. It has an area of 64.33 km2 (24.84 sq mi) and a population of 31,747.
