= Tularampur Union =

Tularampur Union তুলারামপুর ইউনিয়ন
- Union
- Tularampur Union
- Country: Bangladesh
- Division: Khulna
- District: Narail
- Upazila: Narail Sadar
- Established: 1946

Area
  - Total: 48.48 km^{2} (18.72 sq mi)

Population (2011)
  - Total: 16,510
  - Density: 340.6/km^{2} (882.0/sq mi)
- Time zone: UTC+6 (BST)
- Website: tularampurup.narail.gov.bd

Tularampur Union (Bengali: তুলারামপুর ইউনিয়ন) is a Union parishad of Narail Sadar Upazila, Narail District in Khulna Division of Bangladesh. It has an area of 48.48 km2 (18.72 sq mi) and a population of 16,510.
