= Shahabad Union =

Shahabad Union মাইজপাড়া ইউনিয়ন
- Union
- Shahabad Union
- Location within Bangladesh
- Coordinates: 23.2014°N 89.4808°E
- Country: Bangladesh
- Division: Khulna
- District: Narail
- Upazila: Narail Sadar
- Established: 1974

Area
  - Total: 48.69 km^{2} (18.80 sq mi)

Population (2011)
  - Total: 12,572
  - Density: 258.2/km^{2} (668.7/sq mi)
- Time zone: UTC+6 (BST)
- Website: shahabadup.narail.gov.bd

Shahabad Union (Bengali: শাহাবাদ ইউনিয়ন) is a union parishad of Narail Sadar Upazila, Narail District in Khulna Division of Bangladesh. It has an area of 48.69 km2 (18.80 sq mi) and a population of 12,572.
