= Bijoy Sarkar =

Bengali poet, baul singer, lyricist and composer(1903–1985)

- বিজয় সরকার
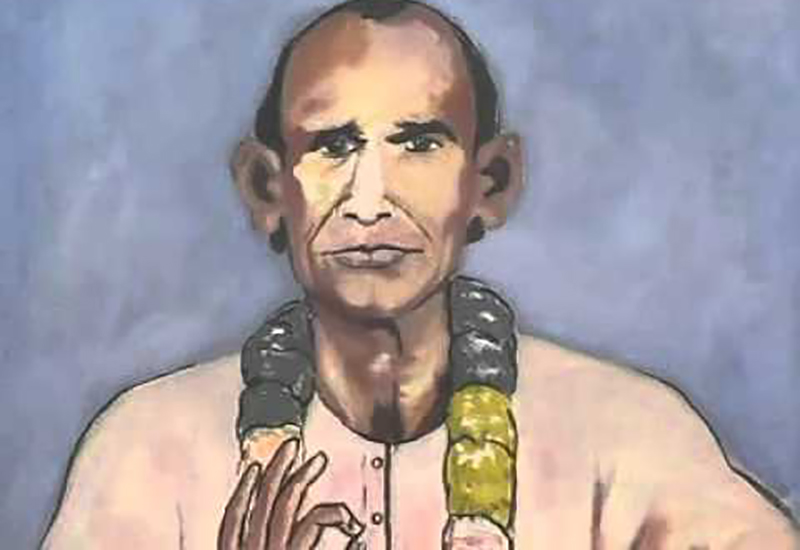
- Born: Bijay Krishna Adhikari; 20 February 1903; Narail, Presidency Division, British India
- Died: 4 December 1985 (aged 82); Belur, Howrah, West Bengal, India
- Known for: poetry, songs

Bijoy Sarkar (born Bijay Krishna Adhikari; 20 February 1903 – 4 December 1985) was a Bengali poet, baul singer, lyricist, and composer.

== Biography ==
Sarkar was born in Dumdi village, Jessore District, British India (now Narail District, Bangladesh).

He studied at Tabra Primary School, taught there briefly, later worked as a rent collector, and participated in stage performances and folk songs. In 1925, he joined Manohar Sarkar from Gopalganj and Rajendranath Sarkar.

== Recordings ==
- Bengali folk songs, Bijoy Sarkarer gaan (2004)

== Awards ==
Sarkar was awarded the Ekushey Padak, Bangladesh's highest civilian award for contribution in the field of arts, posthumously in 2013.
