= Dighalia Union, Lohagara =

Dighalia Union দিঘলিয়া ইউনিয়ন
- Union
- Dighalia Union
- Country: Bangladesh
- Division: Khulna
- District: Narail
- Upazila: Lohagara Upazila

Area
  - Total: 30.33 km^{2} (11.71 sq mi)

Population (2011)
  - Total: 27,444
  - Density: 904.8/km^{2} (2,344/sq mi)
- Time zone: UTC+6 (BST)
- Website: digholiaup1.narail.gov.bd

Dighalia Union (Bengali: দিঘলিয়া ইউনিয়ন) is a Union Parishad under Lohagara Upazila of Narail District in Khulna Division, Bangladesh. It has an area of 30.33 km^{2} (11.71 sq mi) and a population of 27,444.
