= Mulia Union =

Mulia Union মুলিয়া ইউনিয়ন
- Union
- Mulia Union
- Country: Bangladesh
- Division: Khulna
- District: Narail
- Upazila: Narail Sadar

Area
  - Total: 30.46 km^{2} (11.76 sq mi)

Population (2011)
  - Total: 9,201
  - Density: 302.1/km^{2} (782.4/sq mi)
- Time zone: UTC+6 (BST)
- Postal code: 7500
- Website: muliaup.narail.gov.bd

Mulia Union (Bengali: মুলিয়া ইউনিয়ন) is a Union parishad of Narail Sadar Upazila, Narail District in Khulna Division of Bangladesh. The Union has an area of 0.46 km2 (11.76 sq mi) and a population of 9,201.

== Demography ==
Religions in Mulia Union (2022)
Religion	Percent
Hinduism	91.68%
Islam	7.84%
Other or not stated	0.48%
