= Mallikpur Union =

Mallikpur Union মল্লিকপুর ইউনিয়ন
- Union
- Mallikpur Union
- Country: Bangladesh
- Division: Khulna
- District: Bagerhat
- Upazila: Lohagara Upazila

Area
  - Total: 32.22 km^{2} (12.44 sq mi)

Population (2011)
  - Total: 22,195
  - Density: 688.9/km^{2} (1,784/sq mi)
- Time zone: UTC+6 (BST)
- Website: mallikpurup.narail.gov.bd

Mallikpur Union (Bengali: মল্লিকপুর ইউনিয়ন) is a Union Parishad under Lohagara Upazila of Narail District in the division of Khulna, Bangladesh. It has an area of 32.22 km2 (12.44 sq mi) and a population of 22,195 (2011).
