= Bhadrabila Union =

Bhadrabila Union ভদ্রবিলা ইউনিয়ন
- Union
- Bhadrabila Union
- Country: Bangladesh
- Division: Khulna
- District: Narail
- Upazila: Narail Sadar

Area
  - Total: 33.67 km^{2} (13.00 sq mi)

Population (2011)
  - Total: 21,716
  - Density: 645.0/km^{2} (1,670/sq mi)
- Time zone: UTC+6 (BST)
- Website: bhadrabilaup.narail.gov.bd

Bhadrabila Union (Bengali: মাইজপাড়া ইউনিয়ন) is a Union parishad of Narail Sadar Upazila, in Narail District in Bangladesh's Khulna Division. It has an area of 33.67 km2 (13.00 sq mi) and a population of 21,716.
