= Banshgram Union =

Banshgram Union বাঁশগ্রাম ইউনিয়ন
- Union
- Banshgram Union
- Country: Bangladesh
- Division: Khulna
- District: Narail
- Upazila: Narail Sadar
- Established: 1976

Area
  - Total: 48.69 km^{2} (18.80 sq mi)

Population (2011)
  - Total: 12,481
  - Density: 256.3/km^{2} (663.9/sq mi)
- Time zone: UTC+6 (BST)
- Postal Code: 7500
- Website: bashgramup.narail.gov.bd

Banshgram Union (Bengali: বাঁশগ্রাম ইউনিয়ন) is au Union parishad of Narail Sadar Upazila, Narail District in Khulna Division of Bangladesh. It has an area of 46.62 km2 48.69 km2 (18.80 sq mi) and a population of 12,481.
