= Auria Union =

Auria Union আউড়িয়া ইউনিয়ন
- Union
- Auria Union
- Country: Bangladesh
- Division: Khulna
- District: Narail
- Upazila: Narail Sadar
- Established: 1929

Area
  - Total: 51.88 km^{2} (20.03 sq mi)

Population (2011)
  - Total: 22,897
  - Density: 441.3/km^{2} (1,143/sq mi)
- Time zone: UTC+6 (BST)
- Website: auriaup.narail.gov.bd

Auria Union (Bengali: আউড়িয়া ইউনিয়ন) is a Union parishad of Narail Sadar Upazila, Narail District in Khulna Division of Bangladesh. It has an area of 51.88 km2 (20.03 sq mi) and a population of 22,897.
