= Sheikhati Union =

Sheikhati Union শেখহাটী ইউনিয়ন
- Union
- Sheikhati Union
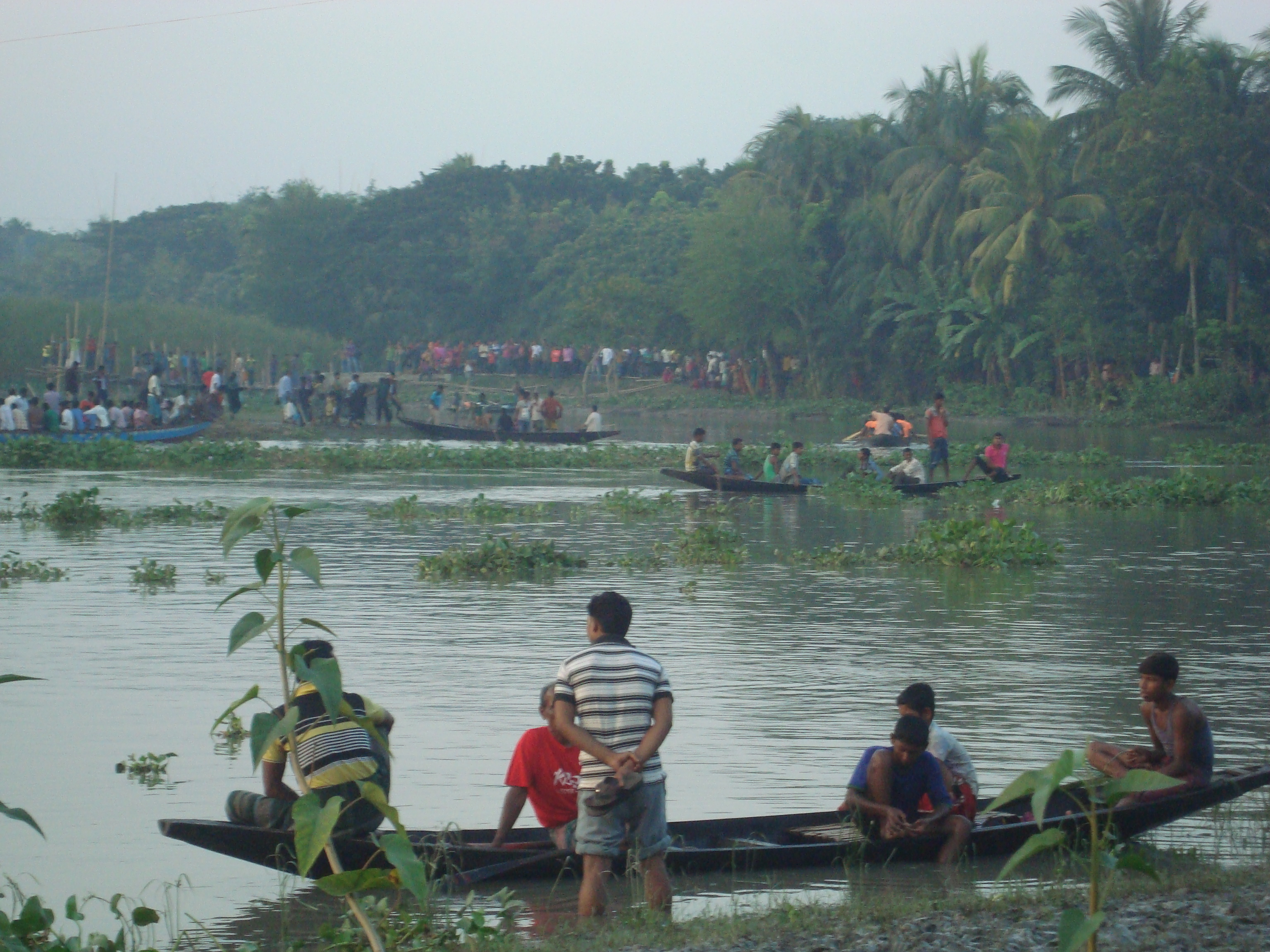
- Skyline of Narail Sadar Upazila
- Country: Bangladesh
- Division: Khulna
- District: Narail
- Upazila: Narail Sadar
- Established: 1921

Area
  - Total: 23.45 km^{2} (9.05 sq mi)

Population (2011)
  - Total: 21,927
  - Density: 935.1/km^{2} (2,422/sq mi)
- Time zone: UTC+6 (BST)
- Website: sheikhatiup.narail.gov.bd

Sheikhati Union (Bengali: শেখহাটী ইউনিয়ন) is a union parishad of Narail Sadar Upazila, Narail District in Khulna Division of Bangladesh. It has an area of 23.45 km2 (9.05 sq mi) and a population of 21,927.
