= Singasholpur Union =

Singasholpur Union সিঙ্গাশোলপুর ইউনিয়ন
- Union
- Singasholpur Union
- Country: Bangladesh
- Division: Khulna
- District: Narail
- Upazila: Narail Sadar

Area
  - Total: 39.63 km^{2} (15.30 sq mi)

Population (2011)
  - Total: 16,034
  - Density: 404.6/km^{2} (1,048/sq mi)
- Time zone: UTC+6 (BST)
- Website: singasholpurup.narail.gov.bd

Singasholpur Union (Bengali: সিঙ্গাশোলপুর ইউনিয়ন) is a Union parishad of Narail Sadar Upazila, Narail District in Khulna Division of Bangladesh. It has an area of 39.63 km2 (15.30 sq mi) and a population of 16,034.
