= Naldi Union =

Naldi Union নলদী ইউনিয়ন
- Union
- Naldi Union
- Country: Bangladesh
- Division: Khulna
- District: Bagerhat
- Upazila: Lohagara Upazila

Area
  - Total: 36.26 km^{2} (14.00 sq mi)

Population (2011)
  - Total: 25,195
  - Density: 694.8/km^{2} (1,800/sq mi)
- Time zone: UTC+6 (BST)
- Website: naldiup.narail.gov.bd

Naldi Union (Bengali: নলদী ইউনিয়ন) is a Union Parishad in Lohagara Upazila of Narail District, Khulna Division, Bangladesh. It has an area of 36.26 km2 (14.00 sq mi) and a population of 25,195.
