= Habokhali Union =

Habokhali Union হবখালি ইউনিয়ন
- Union
- Habokhali Union
- Location within Bangladesh
- Country: Bangladesh
- Division: Khulna
- District: Narail
- Upazila: Narail Sadar

Area
  - Total: 46.62 km^{2} (18.00 sq mi)

Population (2011)
  - Total: 17,942
  - Density: 384.9/km^{2} (996.8/sq mi)
- Time zone: UTC+6 (BST)
- Website: habokhaliup.narail.gov.bd

Habokhali Union (Bengali: হবখালি ইউনিয়ন) is a Union parishad of Narail Sadar Upazila, Narail District in Khulna Division of Bangladesh. It has an area of 46.62 km2 (18.00 sq mi) and a population of 17,942.
