= Md. Kabirul Haque =

Bangladeshi politician

- মোঃ কবিরুল হক

Member of Parliament for Narail-1
- In office 25 January 2009 – 6 August 2024
- Preceded by: Dhirendra Nath Saha
- Succeeded by: Biswas Jahangir Alam

Personal details
- Party: Bangladesh Awami League

Md. Kabirul Haque is a Bangladesh Awami League politician and a former member of Jatiya Sangsad representing the Narail-1 constituency.

== Early life ==
Haque was born on 30 June 1971. He has a M.A. degree.

== Career ==
Haque was elected to parliament from Narail-1 in 2008 and re-elected on 5 January 2014 as a Bangladesh Awami League candidate. 11th general election on 30 December 2018, he was elected member of parliament for 3rd time & for 4th time in 2024.

Following the fall of the Sheikh Hasina led Awami League government, Haque's house was burned down in February 2025. His house along with more than 50 houses and businesses owned by Awami League supporters were burned down on 21 November 2026.
