= Madhumati Bridge =

Bridge in Bangladesh

Madhumati Bridge মধুমতি সেতু
- Coordinates: 23°11′38″N 89°41′28″E
- Carries: Motor vehicles
- Crosses: Madhumati River
- Other name: Kalna Bridge
- Named for: Madhumati River
- Owner: Bangladesh Bridge Authority

Characteristics
- Design: Network arch bridge
- Total length: 690 m (2,260 ft)
- Width: 27 m (89 ft)
- No. of lanes: 6

History
- Construction start: 24 January 2015
- Construction cost: ৳9.6 billion
- Opened: 11 October 2022; 3 years ago
- Inaugurated: 10 October 2022

Statistics
- Toll: Yes

The Madhumati Bridge (Bengali: মধুমতি সেতু), also called the Kalna Bridge (Bengali: কালনা সেতু), is a 690-metre-long, 6-lane bridge across the Madhumati River in Bangladesh. The bridge connects the districts of Narail, Khulna, Magura, Satkhira, Chuadanga, Jashore, Jhenaidah, Gopalganj and a few others in the southwest and northwest. The bridge carries national highway N806, and is a part of the Asian Highway Project.

The bridge has four high-speed lanes and two service lanes. Madhumati Bridge was inaugurated by Sheikh Hasina from her official residence at Ganabhaban, Sher-E-Bangla Nagar on 10 October 2022, along with the third bridge across the Shitalakkhya River.
