= Maijpara Union =

Union in Khulna, Bangladesh

Maijpara Union মাইজপাড়া ইউনিয়ন
- Union
- Maijpara Union
- Country: Bangladesh
- Division: Khulna
- District: Narail
- Upazila: Narail Sadar

Area
  - Total: 46.62 km^{2} (18.00 sq mi)

Population (2011)
  - Total: 21,927
  - Density: 470.3/km^{2} (1,218/sq mi)
- Time zone: UTC+6 (BST)
- Website: maijparaup.narail.gov.bd

Maijpara Union (Bengali: মাইজপাড়া ইউনিয়ন) is a Union parishad of Narail Sadar Upazila, Narail District in Khulna Division, Bangladesh. It has an area of 46.62 km2 (18.00 sq mi) and a population of 21,927.
