= Kalora Union =

Kalora Union কলোড়া ইউনিয়ন
- Union
- Kalora Union
- Country: Bangladesh
- Division: Khulna
- District: Narail
- Upazila: Narail Sadar

Area
  - Total: 58.95 km^{2} (22.76 sq mi)

Population (2011)
  - Total: 19,478
  - Density: 330.4/km^{2} (855.8/sq mi)
- Time zone: UTC+6 (BST)
- Website: kaloraup.narail.gov.bd

Kalora Union (Bengali: কলোড়া ইউনিয়ন) is a Union parishad of Narail Sadar Upazila, Narail District in Khulna Division, Bangladesh. It has an area of 58.95 km2 (22.76 sq mi) and a population of 19,478.
