= Lakshmipasha Union =

Lakshmipasha Union লক্ষীপাশা ইউনিয়ন
- Union
- Lakshmipasha Union
- Country: Bangladesh
- Division: Khulna
- District: Bagerhat
- Upazila: Lohagara Upazila

Area
  - Total: 43.82 km^{2} (16.92 sq mi)

Population (2011)
  - Total: 10,512
  - Density: 239.9/km^{2} (621.3/sq mi)
- Time zone: UTC+6 (BST)
- Website: lakshmipashaup.narail.gov.bd

Lakshmipasha Union (Bengali: লক্ষীপাশা ইউনিয়ন) is a Union Parishad under Golapganj of Sylhet in the division of Sylhet, Bangladesh. It has an area of 43.82 km2 (16.92 sq mi) and a population of 10,512 (2011).
