= Bisali Union =

Bisali Union বিছালী ইউনিয়ন
- Union
- Bisali Union
- Country: Bangladesh
- Division: Khulna
- District: Narail
- Upazila: Narail Sadar

Area
  - Total: 34.29 km^{2} (13.24 sq mi)

Population (2011)
  - Total: 21,010
  - Density: 612.7/km^{2} (1,587/sq mi)
- Time zone: UTC+6 (BST)
- Postal code: 7500
- Website: bisaliup.narail.gov.bd

Bisali Union (Bengali: বিছালী ইউনিয়ন) is a Union parishad of Narail Sadar Upazila, Narail District in Khulna Division of Bangladesh. Bisali Union has an area of 34.29 km2 (13.24 sq mi) and a population of 21,010.
