= Kashipur Union, Lohagara =

Kashipur Union কাশিপুর ইউনিয়ন
- Union
- Kashipur Union
- Country: Bangladesh
- Division: Khulna
- District: Bagerhat
- Upazila: Lohagara Upazila

Area
  - Total: 49.21 km^{2} (19.00 sq mi)

Population (2011)
  - Total: 13,608
  - Density: 276.5/km^{2} (716.2/sq mi)
- Time zone: UTC+6 (BST)
- Website: kashipurup.narail.gov.bd

Kashipur Union (Bengali: মল্লিকপুর ইউনিয়ন) is a Union Parishad under Lohagara Upazila of Narail District in Khulna Division, Bangladesh. It has an area of 49.21 km2 (19.00 sq mi) and a population of 13,608.
