= Chandiborpur Union =

Chandiborpur Union চন্ডিবরপুর ইউনিয়ন
- Union
- Chandiborpur Union
- Country: Bangladesh
- Division: Khulna
- District: Narail
- Upazila: Narail Sadar
- Established: 1946

Area
  - Total: 45.04 km^{2} (17.39 sq mi)

Population (2011)
  - Total: 24,745
  - Density: 549.4/km^{2} (1,423/sq mi)
- Time zone: UTC+6 (BST)
- Website: chandiborpurup.narail.gov.bd

Chandiborpur Union (Bengali: চন্ডিবরপুর ইউনিয়ন) is a Union parishad of Narail Sadar Upazila, Narail District in Khulna Division of Bangladesh. The union has an area of 45.04 km2 (17.39 sq mi) and a population of 24,745.
