= Narail Government Victoria College =

Coordinates: 23.1626°N 89.4994°E

Narail Government Victoria Collegeis a public college in Narail district, Bang

== History ==
Narail Victoria College was established in 1886 by Chandra Roy. The college was named after Queen Victoria of Britain. After the Partition of India in 1947, it faced financial difficulties and was nationalized in 1970.

As of September 2021 Robiul Islam serves as the school's principal.

== Department ==
Narail Govt. Victoria College offers BSC(Honors), BA(Honors) and B.Com(Honors) degree by National University, Bangladesh. The following courses are offered by Narail Govt. Victoria College.

- Bangla
- English
- Economics
- Political Science
- Management
- Philosophy
- History
- Botany
- Zoology
- Physics
- Chemistry

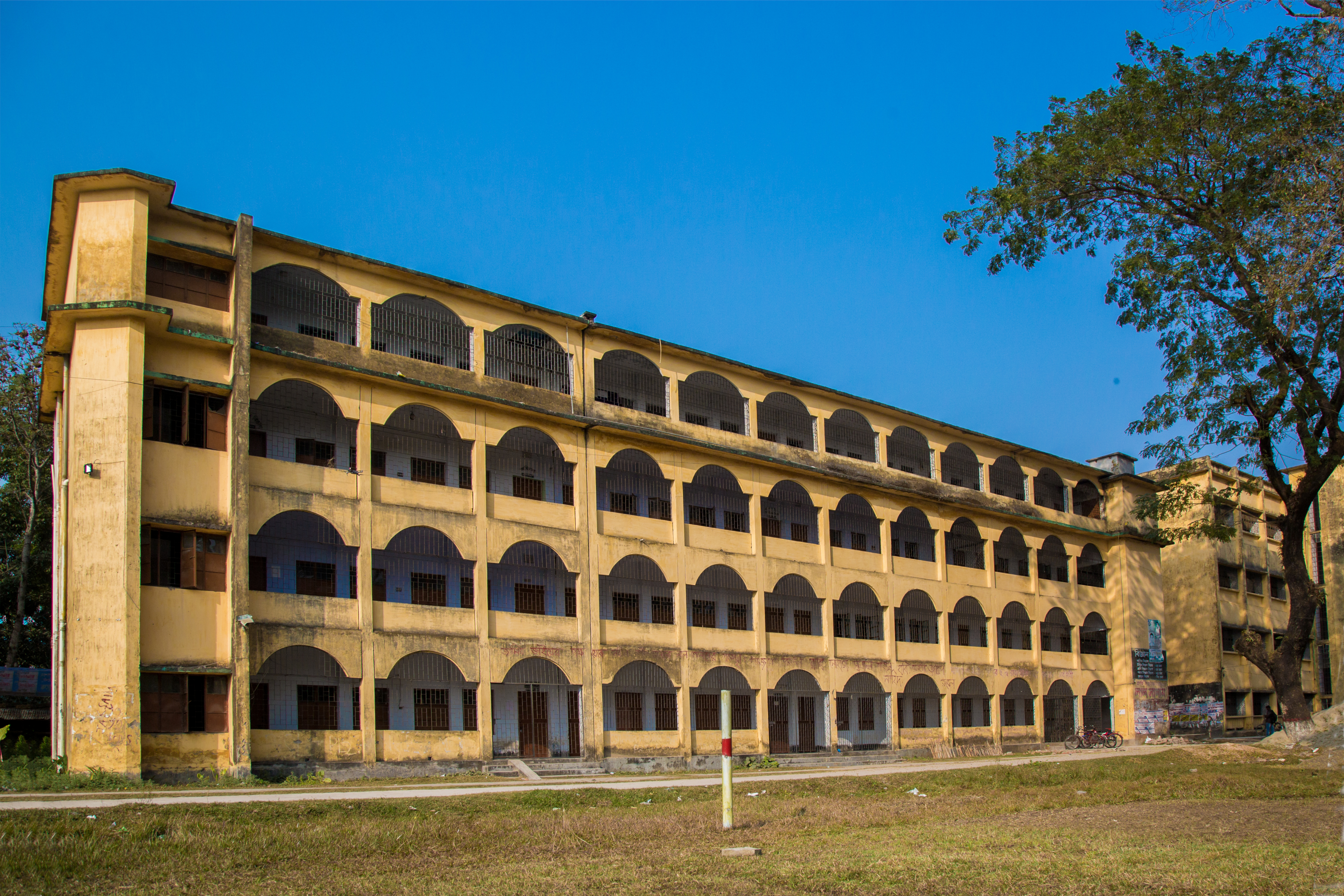
Narail Government Victoria College

== Notable students ==
- Mashrafe Mortaza, Captain, Bangladesh National Cricket Team
