= Joynagar, West Tripura =

Joynagar
- village
- Location in Tripura, India
- Coordinates: 23.832°N 91.258°E
- Country: India
- State: Tripura

Languages
  - Official: Bengali, Kokborok, English
- Time zone: UTC+5:30 (IST)
- Vehicle registration: TR
- Website: tripura.gov.in

Joynagar is a village near Kolabagan in Sadar sub-division of West Tripura district of Tripura.
