= Itna Union =

Itna Union ইতনা ইউনিয়ন
- Union
- Itna Union
- Country: Bangladesh
- Division: Khulna
- District: Bagerhat
- Upazila: Lohagara Upazila

Area
  - Total: 75.11 km^{2} (29.00 sq mi)

Population (2011)
  - Total: 35,138
  - Density: 467.8/km^{2} (1,212/sq mi)
- Time zone: UTC+6 (BST)
- Website: itnaup.narail.gov.bd

Itna Union (Bengali: ইতনা ইউনিয়ন) is a Union Parishad under Lohagara Upazila of Narail District in the division of Khulna, Bangladesh. It has an area of 75.11 km2 (29.00 sq mi) and a population of 35,138.
