= Joynagar Union, Kalia =

Joynagar Union জয়নগর ইউনিয়ন
- Union
- Joynagar Union
- Country: Bangladesh
- Division: Khulna
- District: Narail
- Upazila: Kalia Upazila

Area
  - Total: 91.92 km^{2} (35.49 sq mi)

Population (2011)
  - Total: 14,092
  - Density: 153.3/km^{2} (397.1/sq mi)
- Time zone: UTC+6 (BST)
- Website: jaynagorup.narail.gov.bd

Joynagar Union (Bengali: জয়নগর ইউনিয়ন) is a Union Parishad under Kalia Upazila of Narail District in Khulna Division, Bangladesh. It has an area of 91.92 km2 (35.49 sq mi) and a population of 14,092 (2011).

== Villages ==
1. Gachbaria
2. Nayanpur
3. Rampura
4. Joynagar
5. Dulalgati
6. Naragati
7. Dumoria
8. Kamsia
9. Tebaria
10. Debdun
11. Paduma
12. Panipara
13. Keshabpur
14. Bhaurirchar
15. Gharibhanga
16. Char Shuktail
17. Char Ghenashur
