= Joynagar, Agartala =

Human settlement in Tripura, India

Coordinates: 23.833°N 91.257°E

Joynagar is a locality in Agartala, the capital of the Indian state of Tripura. It has 6 lanes. There are 4 clubs that conduct Durga Puja every year. It is a robust market place as well, one of the finest residential areas in the state.

Home of Sapto Sindhu, Trinayani, Yuba Samaj, Aguntuk Club, JPC, Dashami Ghat and NaboDiganto Clubs. Joynagar is situated at the western side of the town Agartala. The closest landmark of Joynagar is the Battala Bazaar which is one of the largest market place of the state and it also has the beautiful Joynagar Lake.

People say,"Maa Durga gives her last visit here before leaving" as the Dashami Ghat (Immersion point) falls in the same area. The two sides Joynagar has two very important points of the city. The Joynagar bus stand is in the route through many processions of the city through. The Dashami Ghat is the place where the immersion of Maa Durga takes place is on the other side. There is also an urban poor housing colony in Joynagar.

Late Biren Datta, Tripura's first Member of Parliament and former Minister and other leaders like CPI (M)'s leader Tarapada Banerjee, had houses in the area.
