= Kalia Union =

Kalia Union কালিয়া ইউনিয়ন
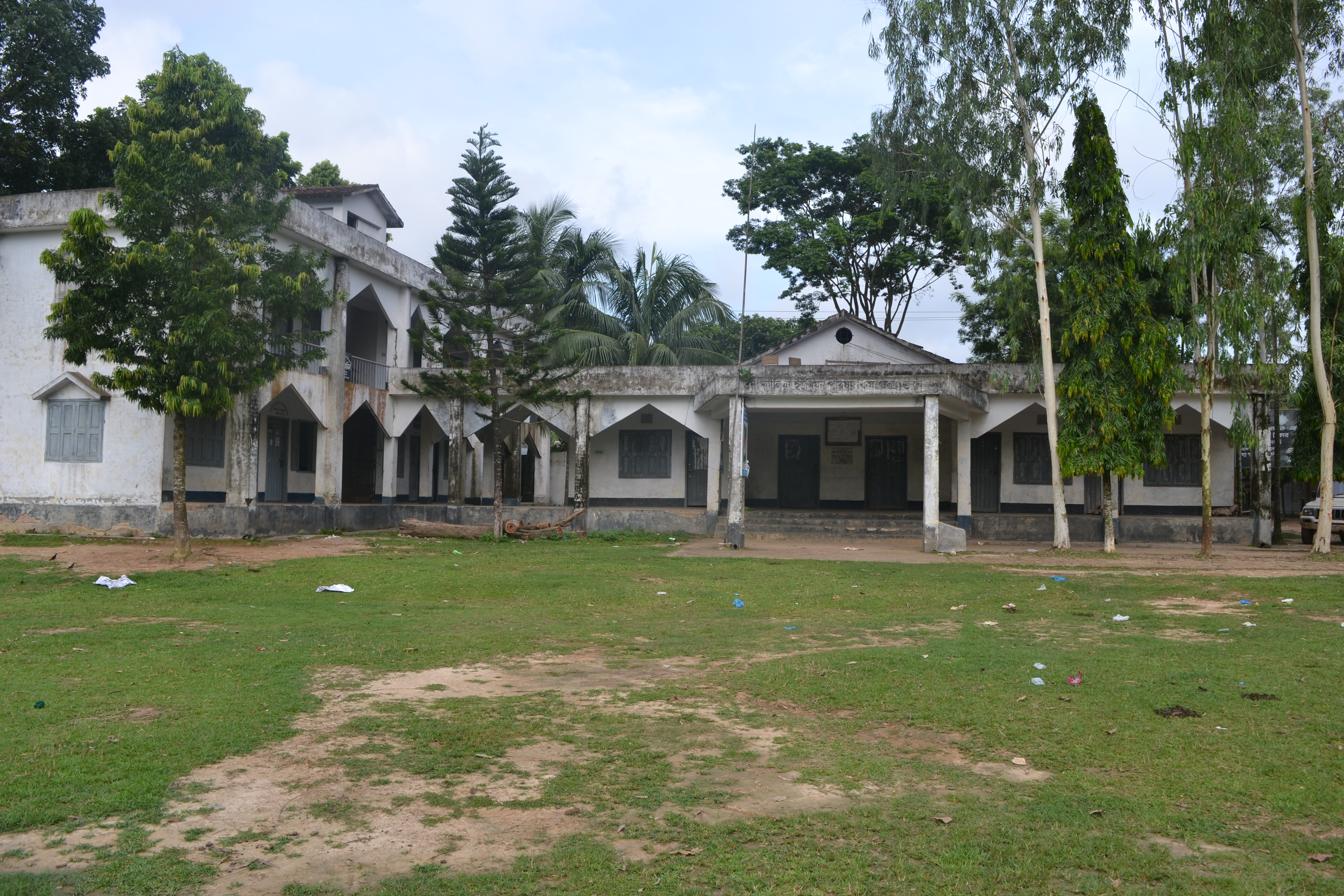

- Location of Kalia Union in Bangladesh
- Coordinates: 24.369116°N 90.197821°E
- Country: Bangladesh
- Division: Dhaka Division
- District: Tangail District
- Upazila: Sakhipur Upazila
- Established: 1984

Government
  - Type: Union Council
  - Chairman: SM Kamrul Hassan (Bangladesh Awami League)

Area
  - Total: 69.5 km^{2} (26.8 sq mi)
- Elevation: 21 m (69 ft)

Population (2011)
  - Total: 53,134
  - Density: 765/km^{2} (1,980/sq mi)
- Time zone: UTC+6 (BST)
- Postal code: 1951
- Website: kaliaup.tangail.gov.bd

Kalia Union (Bengali: কালিয়া ইউনিয়ন) is a union of Sakhipur Upazila, Tangail District, Bangladesh. It is situated 51 kilometres (32 mi) east of Tangail, the district headquarters.

== Demographics ==
According to the 2011 Bangladesh census, Kalia Union had 13,137 households and a population of 53,134. The literacy rate (age 7 and over) was 37.9% (male: 40.4%, female: 35.7%).

== See also ==
- Union Councils of Tangail District
