= Narail Government High School =

Coordinates: 23.1721°N 89.5088°E

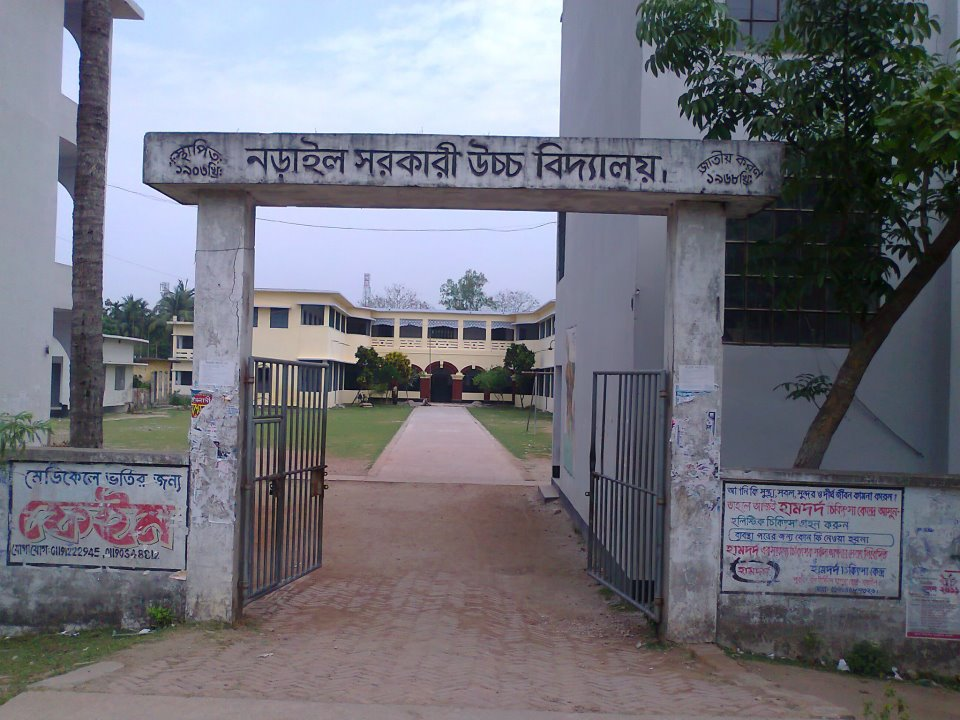

Location
- Main Road, Narail Sadar; Narail; Bangladesh

Information
- Type: Secondary, class 3–10
- Motto: "Read in your God's name, the one who created you"
- Established: 1903 (nationalized in 1968)
- Website: narailgovtsecondaryschool.jessoreboard.gov.bd

Narail Government High School (Bengali: নড়াইল সরকারী উচ্চ বিদ্যালয়) is a secondary school in the Narail district of Bangladesh. In 1903, a lawyer, Gurudas Bhattacharya founded the "Narail English High School". It used to be called as "Narail Subdivision High School". At the beginning, the school only offered humanities subjects. In the 6th decade of 20th century when the school was introduced to science and business classes, it was renamed "Narail Subdivision Multilateral High School". On 1 May 1968, the school was approved by the government of Bangladesh as a government school. In 1984, when Narail became a district from a subdivision, the name of the school was replaced by the name Narail Government High School. The school is also known as the "Boys School".

The school has a total of 1351 enrolled students across departments. With the total land area of 7.34 acres the school is equipped with 6 buildings that house 18 classrooms, 1 multimedia classroom, 3 science labs, and a library.

== Notable students ==
- Mashrafe Bin Mortaza, former captain of the Bangladesh national cricket team
