= Giuseppe Naldi =

Italian singer

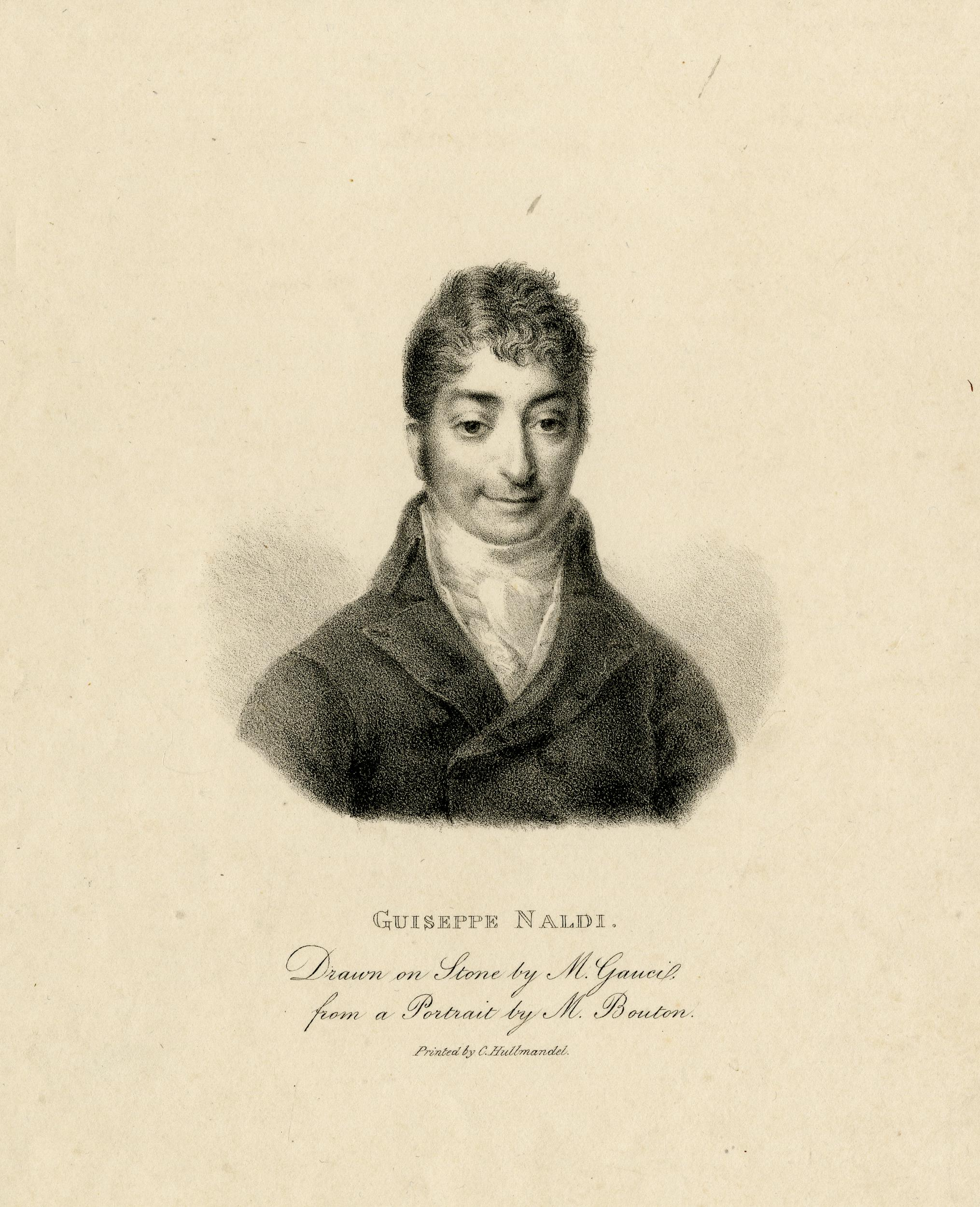
Lithograph, 1810s, in the British Museum

Giuseppe Naldi (2 February 1770 – 15 December 1821) was an Italian operatic baritone, appearing in Italy, Lisbon, Paris, Dublin, and from 1806 to 1819 in London.

== Life ==
Naldi was born in Bologna, the only son of Giuseppe Naldi, a government official. He was educated at the universities of Bologna and Pavia, studying law, his intended profession. He afterwards however became secretary in a government department, where he gave promise of ability; but in 1796 the proclamation of the Republic of Bologna forced him to leave his home town.

He had had some musical training, and played the cello. In the following years he appeared as a singer in cities in Italy. From 1803 to 1806 he lived in Lisbon, where he was engaged at the Teatro Real de São Carlos. From this time he lived with Maria Medina, a Spanish dancer, whose marriage to the dancer Salvatore Viganò was not annulled. Their daughter, Carolina Naldi (1802–1876), became an opera singer, appearing in Paris in 1822–23, and retiring in 1824 after her marriage to the Conte di Sparre.

=== London ===
Naldi made his debut at the King's Theatre in London in April 1806, in Due nozze e un sol marito by Pietro Carlo Guglielmi, and he continued to sing there in every subsequent season up to 1819. Notably, he appeared in English premieres of Mozart's operas: in 1811 as Don Alfonso in Cosi fan tutte and Papageno in The Magic Flute, in 1812 as Figaro in The Marriage of Figaro alongside Angelica Catalani, and in 1817 as Leporello in Don Giovanni. He also played Figaro in the London premiere in 1818 of Rossini's The Barber of Seville, alongside Manuel García. He was in many other operas including Le cantatrici villane by Valentino Fioravanti and Il Fanatico per la musica by Simon Mayr. In the latter, he showed his skill in playing the cello.

Lord Mount Edgcumbe described Naldi's voice as "weak and uncertain"; while another critic called it "sonorous and powerful". All agreed, however, that Naldi was extremely clever, could write very fair verses and compose very tolerable music; had an accurate ear; could play the piano and cello very well; and read at sight with perfect ease and intonation. As an actor, he was excellent, and played with "irresistible humour, effect, judgment, and truth".

=== Last years ===
In August and September 1819, Naldi appeared at the Crow Street Theatre in Dublin, in a company led by the tenor Michael Kelly. Operas included Due nozze e un sol marito, and Il Fanatico per la musica in which Maria Medina and daughter Carolina also appeared.

In that year he was engaged in Paris, where he made his debut in Così fan tutte alongside Manuel Garcia; but his powers were much faded. He returned to London in that, his last, season. He died in Paris in 1821, in Garcia's apartments, when a newly-invented pressure cooker exploded, a trial of which he had been invited to witness.
