= Chitra River =

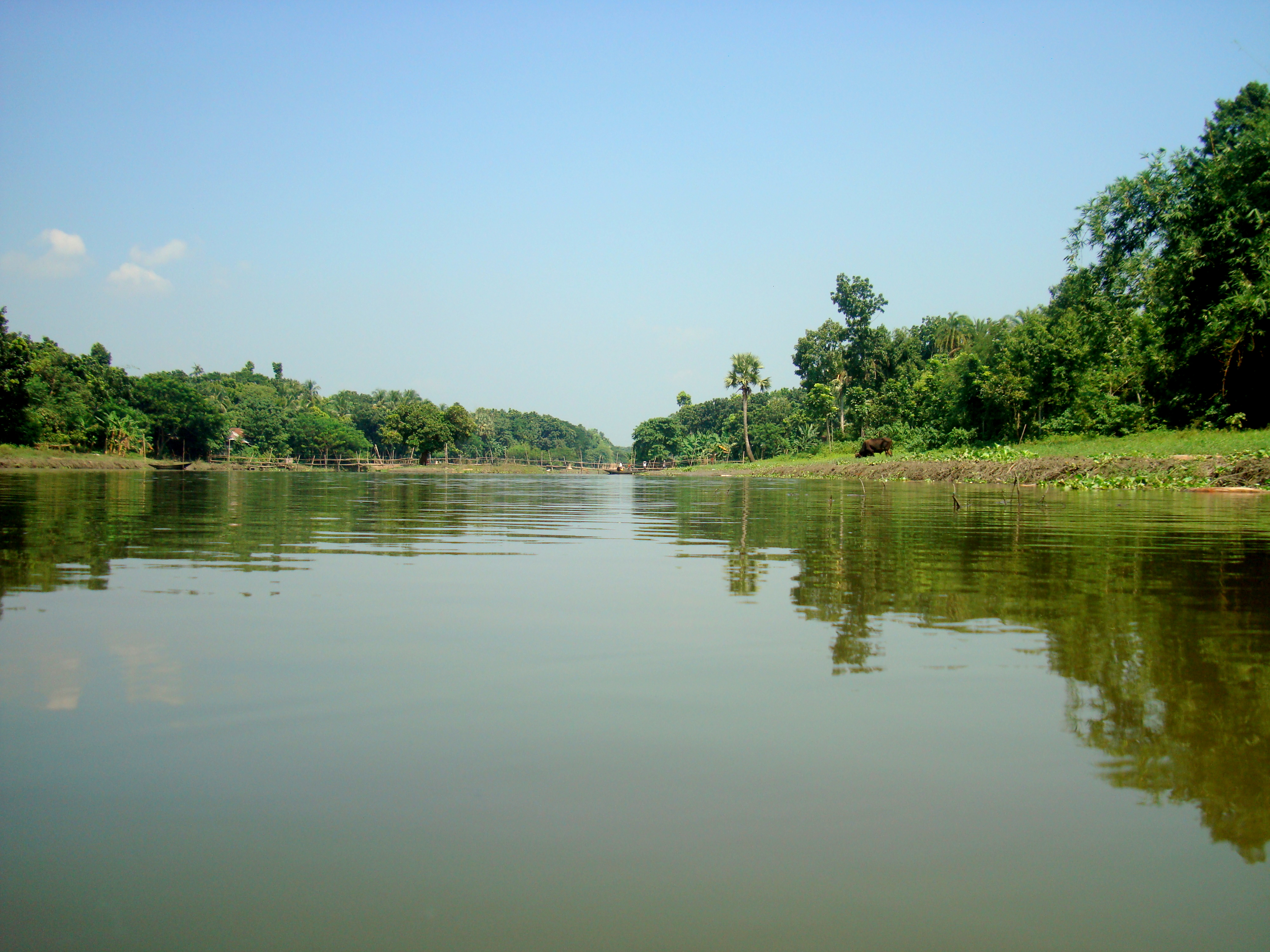
- Chitra River

- Location in Bangladesh

Location
- Country: Bangladesh
- District: Chuadanga, Jessore, Jhenaidah, Magura, Narail

Physical characteristics
- Mouth
  - coordinates: 22.9851°N 89.5584°E
- Length: 170 km (110 mi)

The Chitra River (Bengali: চিত্রা নদী) is a river in Bangladesh which originates in the Chuadanga District and flows southeast into the Nabaganga River.

== Course ==
The Chitra River originates in the lower part of Darshana. It flows about 170 km southeast through Darshana, Kaliganj, Jessore, Shalikha Upazila and Kalia Upazila before joining the Nabaganga River at Gazirhat Union in Narail District. The combined flow then enters the Bhairab River in Daulatpur Upazila of Khulna District.

Historically, it was an offshoot of the Ichamati River, but siltation at its mouth caused it to become a distributary of the Nabaganga River.

According to a government survey, the river was about 150 feet wide in Kaliganj, but it has now narrowed to around 30 to 40 feet, mainly due to encroachment.
