= Gorai-Madhumati River =

River in Bangladesh

Coordinates: 23.9167°N 89.1500°E

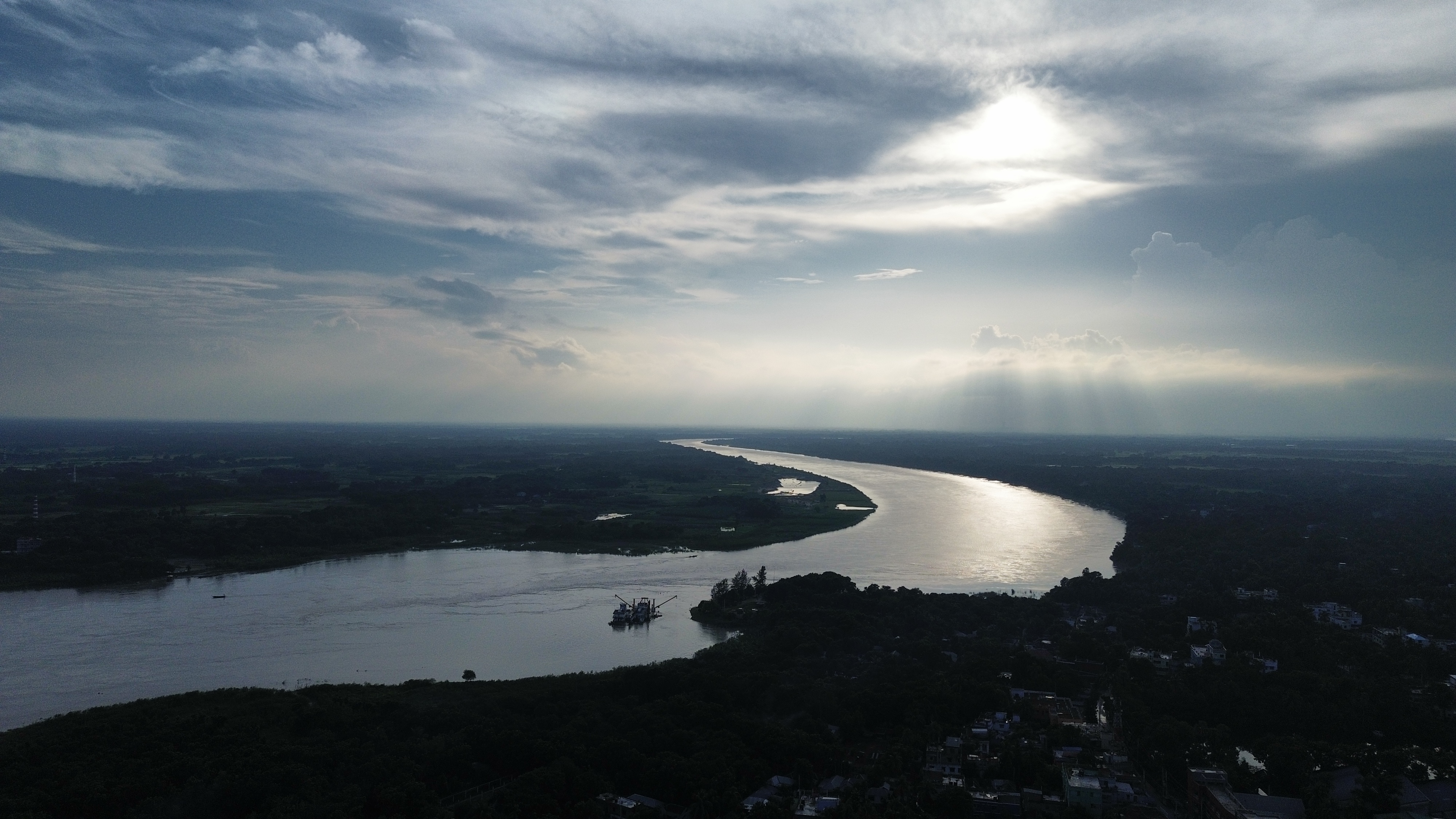
- The river at Kushtia Borobazar ghat
- Native name: গড়াই-মধুমতি নদী (Bengali)

Location
- Country: Bangladesh
- Districts: Kushtia; Jhenaidah; Rajbari; Magura; Faridpur; Narail; Gopalganj; Bagerhat; Pirojpur

Physical characteristics
- Source
  - location: Near Barakhada, Kushtia from Padma river
- Mouth
  - location: Near Hularhar, Pirojpur to Katcha river
- Length: 372 km (231 mi)

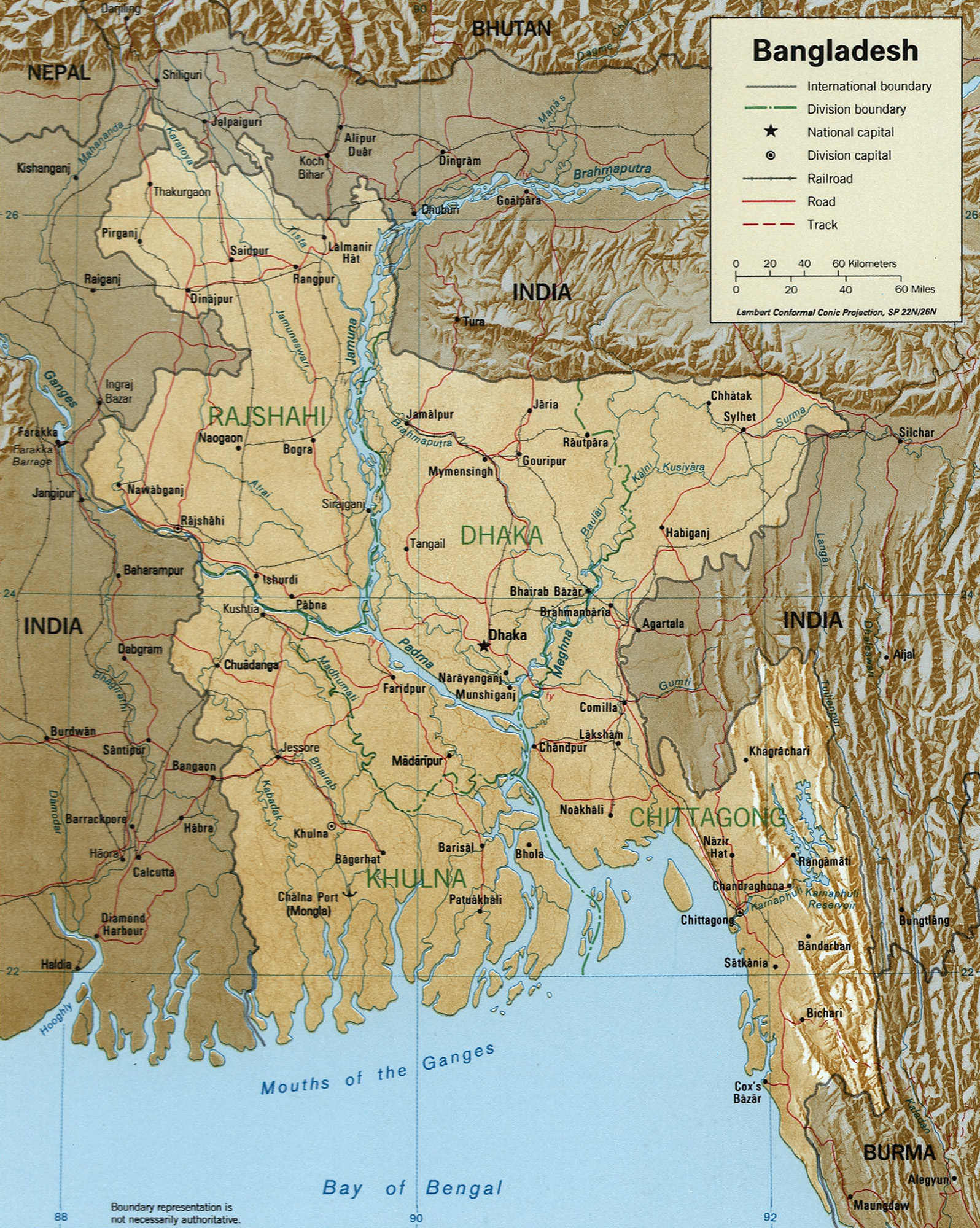
Map showing major rivers in Bangladesh including Gorai-Madhumati

The Gorai-Madhumati (Bengali: গড়াই-মধুমতি, romanized: gaṛāi-madhumati , Gôŗai-Modhumoti) is one of the longest rivers in Bangladesh and a distributary of the Ganges. In its upper reaches, it is called the Gorai, and the name changes to Madhumati further downstream. The Madhumati flows through Kushtia, Jessore, Rajbari, Faridpur, Khulna, Gopalganj, Narail, Magura, Pirojpur and Barguna districts in Bangladesh.

== See also ==
- List of rivers in Bangladesh
- Madhumati Bridge
- Gorai Canal
