= Narail =

- Town
- Location in Bangladesh Narail (Bangladesh)
- Coordinates: 23°11′N 89°30′E
- Country: Bangladesh
- Division: Khulna
- District: Narail
- Upazila: Narail Sadar
- Municipality established: 1972

Area
  - Total: 29.45 km^{2} (11.37 sq mi)

Population (2011)
  - Total: 42,299
  - Density: 1,436/km^{2} (3,720/sq mi)
- Time zone: UTC+6 (BST)

Narail Municipality mahallah geocode map

Narail is a city in the Khulna division of southwestern Bangladesh. It is the district headquarters of Narail District. Narail municipality was established in 1972.

== Demographics ==
Religions in Narail (2011)
Religion	Percent
Islam	74.64%
Hinduism	25.26%
Other or not stated	0.10%

In 2011, Narail city had 9,945 households and a population of 42,299. 7,916 (18.7%) were under 10 years of age. Narail had a sex ratio of 982 females per 1,000 males and a literacy rate of 81.7%.
