= Nabaganga River =

Coordinates: 22.9845°N 89.5607°E

Nabaganga

Location
- Country: Bangladesh

Physical characteristics
- Source
  - location: Chuadanga District, Khulna
- Mouth
  - location: Mathabhanga River
  - elevation: 10 metres (33 ft)
- Length: 214 km
- Basin size: 4,000 km^{2} (1,500 sq mi)

The Nabaganga (Bengali: নবগঙ্গা নদী, romanized: Nabagaṅgā Nadī) is the fourth-biggest river in Bangladesh and a tributary of the Mathabhanga.

== Name ==
The river was named Nabaganga (New Ganges in Bengali) in the belief that the Ganges also derived from the Mathabhanga. The Nabaganga originates near the town of Chuadanga, in Chuadanga District. It flows east, where the Kumar and the Chitra rivers join it at Magura and Narail, respectively. From here, the river turns southward and merges into the Bhairab River. This is a recent change, as it was once a tributary of the Ichamati River. Silt deposits changed the river's course. Efforts to steer the river back to its original course proved futile when dredging in the 1930, at Gaznavi Ghat, failed to produce the desired results. Today, the Nabaganga merges into the Kumar River after flowing through Chuadanga and Jhenaidah Districts. Most of the water in the Nabaganga River from this point on comes from the Kumar.

== Course ==
Length	Width	Depth	River basin
214 km	2250 meters	10 meters	4000 square km

== See also ==
- List of rivers of Bangladesh

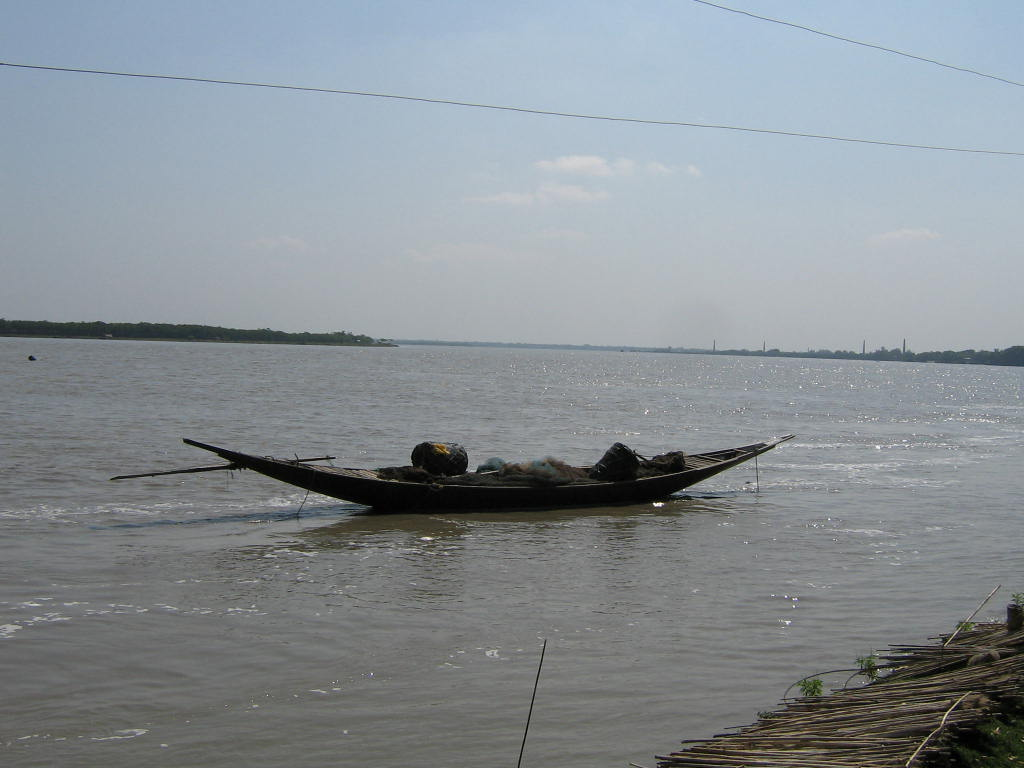
The Ichamati River, of which the Nabaganga was once a tributary.
