= Dhirendra Nath Saha =

Bangladeshi politician

Member of Parliament

Personal details
- Party: Bangladesh Nationalist Party

Dhirendra Nath Saha (died 2017) was a Bangladesh Nationalist Party politician and a member of parliament from Narail-1.

== Career ==
Saha was elected to parliament in 1991, 1996,2001 as a Bangladesh Awami League candidate from Narail-1. /ref> After that, in 2008 he was elected to parliament as a Bangladesh Nationalist Party candidate from Narail-1.

== Death ==
Saha died in 2017; a condolence message was given by the Parliament of Bangladesh.
