= Kalia Upazila =

Upazila in Khulna Division, Bangladesh

Kalia কালিয়া
- Upazila
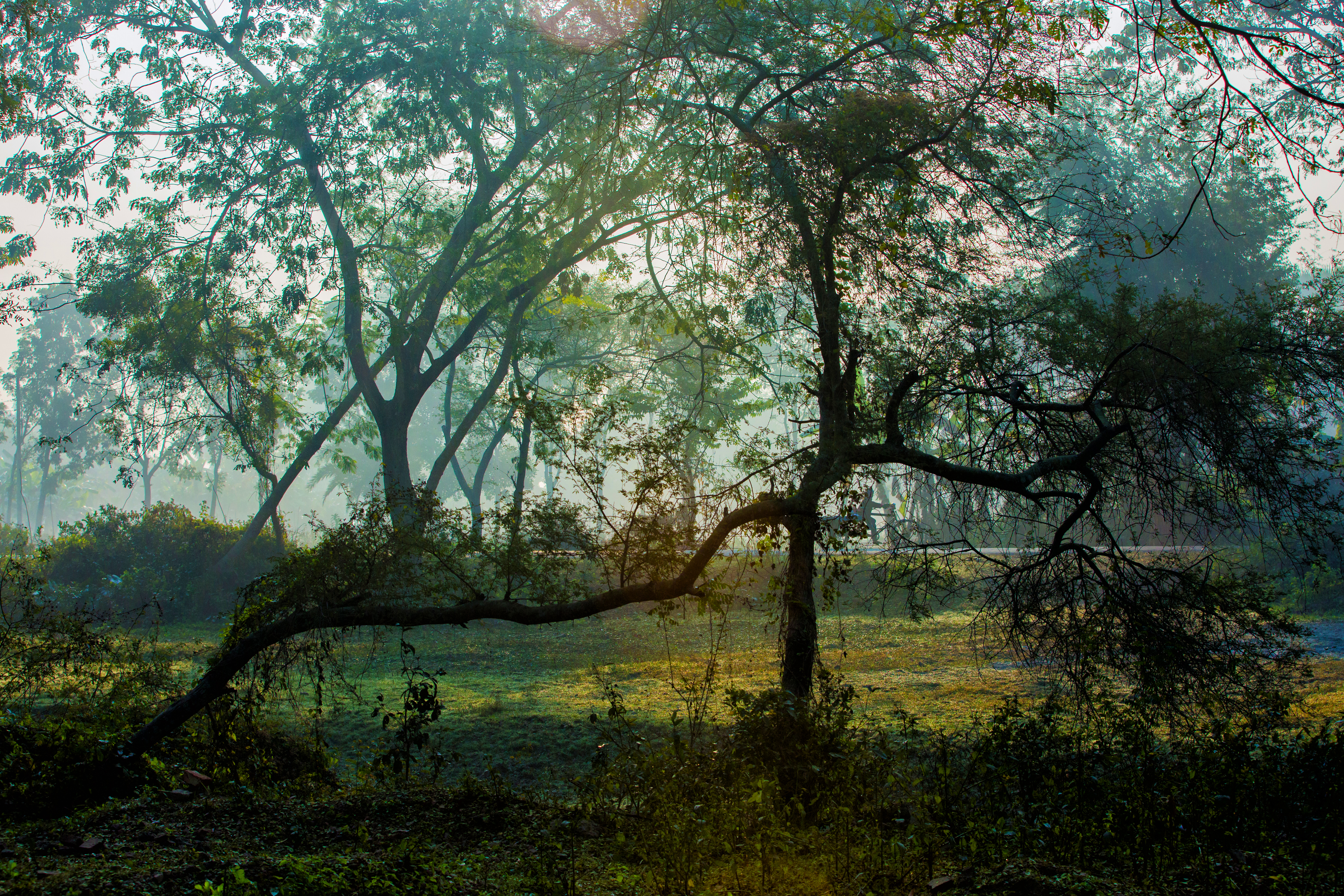
- Arumina Eco-Park

- Coordinates: 23°2′N 89°38′E
- Country: Bangladesh
- Division: Khulna
- District: Narail

Area
  - Total: 301.32 km^{2} (116.34 sq mi)

Population (2022)
  - Total: 243,166
  - Density: 807.00/km^{2} (2,090.1/sq mi)
- Time zone: UTC+6 (BST)
- Postal code: 7520
- Website: kaliapaurashava.com(in Bengali)

Kalia Upazila mauza geocode map

Kalia (Bengali: কালিয়া) is an upazila of Narail District in the division of Khulna, Bangladesh. Kalia Thana was established in 1866 and was converted into an upazila in 1984. It is named after its administrative center, the town of Kalia.

== Geography ==
Kalia Upazila has a total area of 301.32 square kilometres (116.34 sq mi). It borders Lohagara Upazila to the north, Dhaka Division to the east, Bagerhat and Khulna districts to the south, Jessore District to the southwest, and Narail Sadar Upazila to the northwest. The Nabaganga River flows south through the upazila.

== Demographics ==
Historical population
Year	Pop. (000)	±%
1981	184	—
1991	197	+7.1%
2001	208	+5.6%
2011	220	+5.8%
2022	243	+10.5%
Source: Bangladesh Bureau of Statistics

Religions in Kalia Upazila (2022)
Religion	Percent
Islam	87.02%
Hinduism	12.97%
Other or not stated	0.01%

According to the 2022 Bangladeshi census, Kalia Upazila had 59,436 households and a population of 243,166. 10.52% were under 5 years of age. Kalia had a literacy rate of 73.17%: 74.46% for males and 71.93% for females, with a sex ratio of 97.32 males per 100 females. 51,328 (21.11%) lived in urban areas. Ethnic population was 3,051 (1.25%), of which 2,020 are Malo.

As of the 2011 Census of Bangladesh, Kalia upazila had 48,579 households and a population of 220,202. 54,831 (24.90%) were under 10 years of age. Kalia had an average literacy rate of 55.25%, compared to the national average of 51.8%, and a sex ratio of 1019 females per 1000 males. 35,744 (16.23%) of the population lived in urban areas.

== Administration ==
Kalia Upazila is divided into Kalia Municipality and 14 union parishads: Babrahasla, Baioshona, Boronaleliasabad, Chacuri, Hamidpur, Jaynagor, Kalabaria, Khashial, Mauli, Pahardanga, Panchgram, Peroli, Purulia, and Salamabad. The union parishads are subdivided into 111 mauzas and 187 villages.

Kalia Municipality is subdivided into 9 wards and 19 mahallas.

== Education ==
There are five colleges in the upazila. They include Munshi Manik Miah College, and Shaheed Abdus Salam Degree College.

== History of the Liberation War ==
On 8 December 1971, freedom fighters attacked Kalia High School and Municipality house to Pakistani Army and Razakars camp. During the last 3 days (8-10 December), 3 freedom fighters were killed and 4 Pakistani soldiers and 9 Rajakars were killed.

== Religious institutions ==
Mosque 293, Temple 77, Church 1, Tomb 3

== Entertainment center ==
There is located Arunima Eco Park at Panipara, Kalia.

== Notable people ==
- Ekhlas Uddin Ahmed (1932–1985), politician
- Dhirendra Nath Saha (1932–2017), politician
- SM Abu Sayeed (1937–2017), politician
- Sheikh Abdus Salam (1940 1971), teacher and activist

== See also ==
- Upazilas of Bangladesh
- Districts of Bangladesh
- Divisions of Bangladesh
