= Lohagara Upazila, Narail =

Lohagara লোহাগড়া
- Upazila
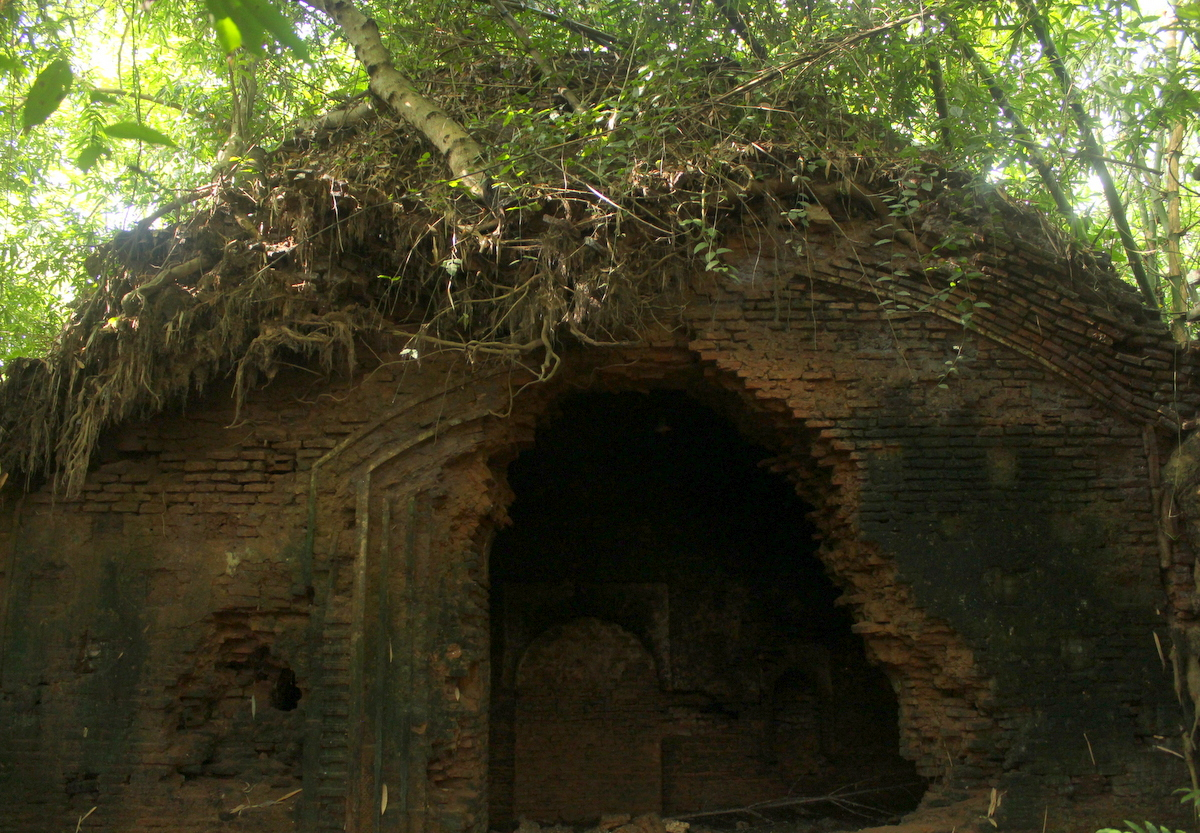
- Jor Bangla Temple in Lohagara

- Coordinates: 23°11′N 89°39′E
- Country: Bangladesh
- Division: Khulna
- District: Narail

Government
  - Mohammad: Ibrahim
  - Prof.: Nur Mohammad Mia

Area
  - Total: 284.91 km^{2} (110.00 sq mi)

Population (2022)
  - Total: 248,437
  - Density: 871.98/km^{2} (2,258.4/sq mi)
- Time zone: UTC+6 (BST)
- Postal code: 7510
- Area code: 04823
- Website: lohagara.narail.gov.bd(in Bengali)

Lohagara (Bengali: লোহাগড়া) is an upazila of Narail District in the division of Khulna, Bangladesh. Lohagara Thana was established in 1861 and was converted into an upazila in 1984. It is named after its administrative center, the town of Lohagara.

== Geography ==
Lohagara Upazila has a total area of 284.91 square kilometres (110.00 sq mi). Situated between the Nabaganga and Madhumati rivers, it borders Magura District to the north, Dhaka Division to the east, Kalia Upazila to the south, and Narail Sadar Upazila to the west.

== Demographics ==
Historical population
Year	Pop. (000)	±%
1981	177	—
1991	208	+17.5%
2001	221	+6.2%
2011	229	+3.6%
2022	248	+8.3%
Source: Bangladesh Bureau of Statistics

Religions in Lohagara Upazila (2022)
Religion	Percent
Islam	90.54%
Hinduism	9.46%
Other or not stated	0.00%

According to the 2022 Bangladeshi census, Lohagara Upazila had 61,636 households and a population of 248,437. 9.87% were under 5 years of age. Lohagara had a literacy rate of 74.52%: 75.50% for males and 73.65% for females, and a sex ratio of 91.24 males per 100 females. 44,722 (18.00%) lived in urban areas. Ethnic population was 1,291 (0.52%), of which 1,238 are Malo.

As of the 2011 Census of Bangladesh, Lohagara upazila had 51,233 households and a population of 228,594. 55,038 (24.08%) were under 10 years of age. Lohagara had an average literacy rate of 61.85%, compared to the national average of 51.8%, and a sex ratio of 1089 females per 1000 males. 25,290 (11.06%) of the population lived in urban areas.

== Points of interest ==
Kalibari Mandir is a Hindu temple in Lakshmipasha dedicated to the goddess Kali. Writing in 1870, James Westland, former Magistrate and Collector of Jeshore, gave an account of its origins:

A hundred years ago, and more, there lived here a pious blacksmith who used frequently to make images of Kali, and after worshipping them to cast them into the river, according to the ceremony of 'bissarjan.' But one night Kali appeared to him and told him that she had determined permanently to take up her abode with him; so he gave her a house. Not very long since a masonry temple was built for her.

== Administration ==
Lohagara Upazila is divided into Lohagara Municipality and 12 union parishads: Dighalia, Itna, Joypur, Kashipur, Kotakul, Lahuria, Lakshmipasha, Lohagara, Mallikpur, Naldi, Noagram, and Shalnagar. The union parishads are subdivided into 154 mauzas and 217 villages.

Lohagara Municipality is subdivided into 9 wards and 24 mahallas.

== Education ==
There are seven colleges in the upazila. They include Lakshmi Pasha Ideal Women's Degree College, Nabaganga Degree College, Itna College (1995), and S.M.A. Ahad College. Lohagara Govt. Adarsha College is the only honors level one.

The madrasa education system includes one fazil madrasa.

== Notable people ==
- Jadunath Majumdar (1859–1932), journalist
- Nihar Ranjan Gupta (1911–1986), dermatologist and novelist
- SK Abu Bakr (born 1942), brigadier general and politician
- Sharif Khasruzzaman (1945–2018), politician
- Sheikh Hafizur Rahman (born 1952), politician
- Mufti Shahidul Islam Sardar (1960–2023), Islamic scholar and parliamentarian
- Sheikh Mohammad Aman Hasan (born 1960), major general
- Sheikh Mohammad Shafiuddin Ahmed (born 1963), former chief of the Bangladesh Army
- Quazi Sazzad Hossain (born 1968), vice-chancellor of Khulna University of Engineering & Technology
- Mashrafe bin Mortaza (born 1983), former captain of Bangladesh national cricket team
- Saif Hafizur Rahman Khokan, politician

== See also ==
- Upazilas of Bangladesh
- Districts of Bangladesh
- Divisions of Bangladesh
