= Narail District =

Narail district নড়াইল জেলা
- District of Bangladesh
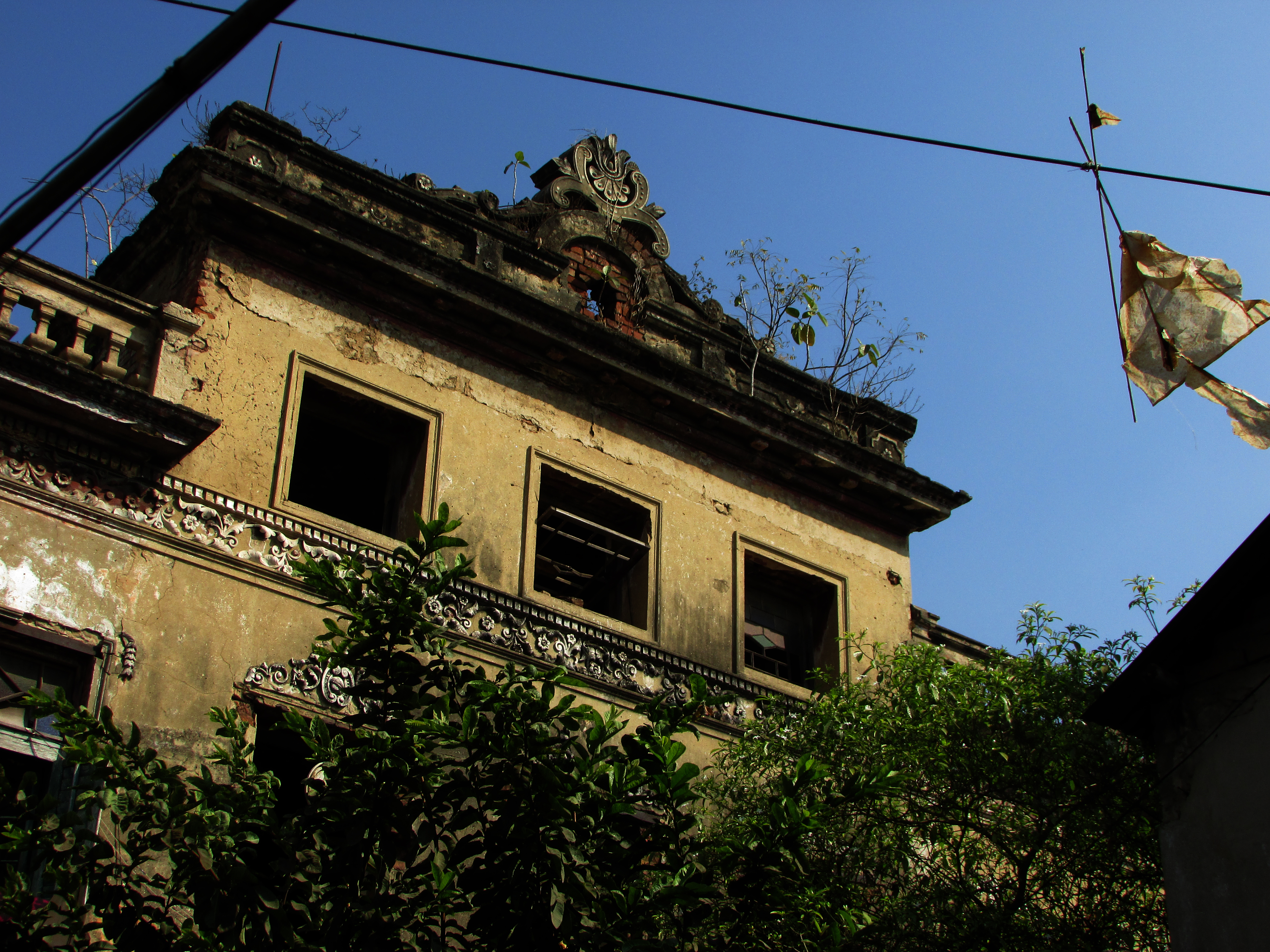
- Narail House

- Location of Narail District in Bangladesh
- Expandable map of Narail District
- Coordinates: 23.13°N 89.50°E
- Country: Bangladesh
- Division: Khulna
- Headquarters: Narail

Government
  - Deputy Commissioner: Dr. Mohammad Abdul Salam
  - Chief Executive Officer: Md. Asaduzzaman (Deputy Secretary)

Area
  - Total: 967.99 km^{2} (373.74 sq mi)

Population (2022)
  - Total: 788,671
  - Density: 814.75/km^{2} (2,110.2/sq mi)
- Postal code: 7500
- Area code: 0481
- ISO 3166 code: BD-43
- HDI (2023): ▲0.703 high · 3rd of 20
- Website: www.narail.gov.bd(in Bengali)

Narail District (Bengali: নড়াইল জেলা) is a district in south-western Bangladesh. It is a part of Khulna Division.

As 'B' Category district 'NARAIL' has its own smart app management system as Narail District Social Security Reporting Narail DSSR. Where people of Narail District can make complaints, report against society's corruptions, extortions, roberry, online gambling or anti-social activities, those reports will automatically proceed to the relevant law enforcement authorities in real time.

== History ==
Narail town was named after a feudal lord (a zamindar). The zamindars established a market at Roopgonj, also named after a zamindar. They established a post office for the first time in the district during British Raj near Rotongonj, named after yet another member of the zamindar's family. They modernized Narail and promoted culture, sports, and education.

The large playing field, Kuriddobe, was a gift for the town by the zamindar's family. They introduced a football competition, with a shield given to the champions, a cup for the runners-up, and medals for all players from the early twentieth century.

One of the zamindars moved away from Narail, settled in Hatbaria, and established another large manor (Jomidarbaari).

== Geography ==
Narail District has an area of 967.99 square kilometres (373.74 sq mi). It is located to the south of Magura District, north of Khulna District, with the Faridpur District and Gopalganj District on the east, and Jessore District to the west.

Its average temperature ranges between 11.2 and 37.1 °C (52.2 and 98.8 °F) and has a yearly rainfall of 1,467 mm (57.8 in).

Through the district flow the Madhumati, Nabaganga, Bhairab, and Chitra rivers. There are many beels and haors, the most noted of which is Chachuri Beel.

Land area:

- Cultivable area: 176,504-acre (714 km^{2})
- Fallow land: 25,090-acre (102 km^{2})
- Forest area: 10 acres
- Area irrigated: 36,208-acre (147 km^{2})
- River area: 8,562-acre (35 km^{2})

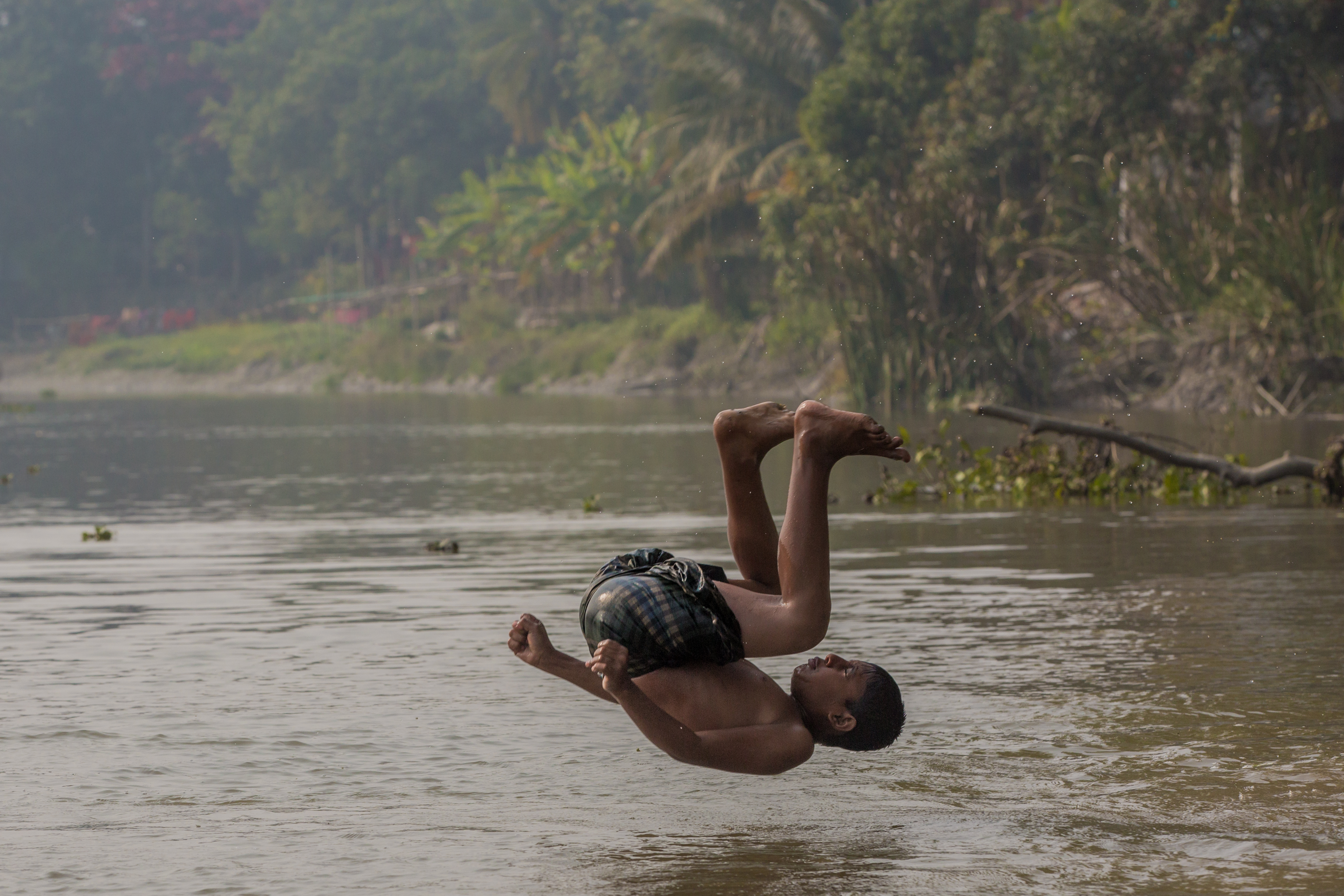
Chitra River, Narail

== Administration ==
Narail District upazila geocode map

Narail District was established in 1984. It is divided into three upazilas:

- Narail Sadar Upazila
- Kalia Upazila
- Lohagara Upazila

The upazilas are further divided into Narail Sadar and Kalia municipalities, and 39 union parishads. These are subdivided into 18 wards, 43 mahallas, 445 mouzas, and 651 villages.

== Points of interest ==
Narail Victoria College and Collegiate School is one of the oldest modern high schools in Bangladesh, established in 1858 by the landlords of Narail who were proponents of education. They also established a girls' school, a rarity in Bangladesh at that time. This was the Shib Shankar Memorial Girls' School. This school closed down due to lack of funding after the landlords left for India. It was reopened by some local enthusiasts, like J. Bhattacharjee, S. Biswas and B. Bhowmic. They borrowed furnishings from the neighbours. They went house to house soliciting parents to send their children to the school.

Narail Palace was one of the biggest landlord mansions in Bengal. When the Hindu landlords left for Kolkata after the partition of India, the mansion was looted and vandalised, and gradually collapsed. There are still some remains present, including the Kaalibaari (temple of goddess Kali), Shibmondir (temple of Shiva) and the Bandha ghaat on the River Chitra. Some local people initially continued the famous Durga Puja in the mansion, but this was discontinued after a few years. Part of the building was used for some time as a government office. Due to lack of maintenance, it gave in.

Kalia Palace was another large landlord mansions in Bengal. Some landlords lived in Naragati. Naragati was a thana in the British period. The predecessor of Robi Sankar & Uday Sankar lived in Kalia.

Famous dancer Uday Shankar and Ravi Shankar ancestral home is in Kalia sub-division of Narail district which is now known as Kalia rest house.

The famous writer Bankim Chandra Chattopadhyay was a magistrate in Narail. His book Neelkuthi was based on the forceful cultivation of indigo in Narail by the East India Company.

Sheikh Mohammed Sultan (10 August 1923 – 10 October 1994; better known as SM Sultan, Bengali: এস এম সুলতান), was a Bengali avant-garde artist who worked in painting and drawing, was born in Narail District. His fame rests on his striking depictions of exaggeratedly muscular farmers engaged in the activities of their everyday lives. He is the son of Sheikh Mohammed Mecher Ali & Mohammed Meherunnesa.

Narail was once declared independent from the British Raj by Shorola di (Sister Shorola), as she was known at the time by her followers of the independence movement of India. But this "independence" lasted for only three days.

== Transport ==
The town of Narail is the road transport hub of the district. To the west it is connected by regional highway R750 to Jessore, about 32 km away. R720 runs north 50 km to Magura. Within the district, Zilla road Z7503 runs east to Lohagara and on to the Kalna ferry ghat on the Madhumati River. Z7502 runs south, across the Nabaganga River at Baroipara Ghat by ferry, and on to Kalia.

== Demographics ==
Historical population
Year	Pop.	±% p.a.
1981	588,812	—
1991	655,720	+1.08%
2001	698,447	+0.63%
2011	721,668	+0.33%
2022	788,671	+0.81%

According to the 2022 Census of Bangladesh, Narail District had 195,660 households and a population of 788,671 with an average 3.98 people per household. Among the population, 148,027 (18.77%) inhabitants were under 10 years of age. The population density was 815 people per km^{2}. Narail District had a literacy rate (age 7 and over) of 74.66%, compared to the national average of 74.80%, and a sex ratio of 1056 females per 1000 males. Approximately, 22.14% of the population lived in urban areas. Ethnic population was 8,278 (1.05%), of which half are Malo.

=== Religion ===
Religions in Narail District (2022)
Religion	Percent
Islam	84.19%
Hinduism	15.78%
Other or not stated	0.03%

Religion in present-day Narail District
Religion	1941 (Note: Narail subdivision of Jessore district, excluding Alfadanga thana)		1981		1991		2001		2011		2022	
Religion	Pop.	%	Pop.	%	Pop.	%	Pop.	%	Pop.	%	Pop.	%
Islam	173,674	50.10%	407,929	69.28%	490,915	74.87%	549,702	78.70%	586,588	81.28%	663,961	84.19%
Hinduism	172,697	49.82%	180,589	30.67%	164,286	25.05%	148,339	21.24%	134,594	18.65%	124,465	15.78%
Others (Note: Including Jainism, Christianity, Buddhism, Zoroastrianism, Judaism, Ad-Dharmis, or not stated)	269	0.08%	294	0.05%	519	0.08%	406	0.06%	486	0.07%	245	0.03%
Total Population	346,640	100%	588,812	100%	655,720	100%	698,447	100%	721,668	100%	788,671	100%

In 2011, Muslims were 81.28% of the population while Hindus are 18.65% of the population, mostly from Scheduled Caste communities. The population of Hindus has been declining rapidly in the district since Partition, when the two communities were in equal numbers.

The district of Narail has 1,675 mosques, 248 temples, 51 christian churches, seven tombs, and 11 shrines.

The Radha Raman Smriti Tirtha Mandir, founded by Shri Tribhanga Brahmachary (Babaji of Shri Shri Bhagvat Sevashram Sangh) at Debbhog is a prominent place to visit.

== Notable people ==
- Jadunath Majumdar, editor
- SM Sultan, artist
- Ravi Shankar, sitar master and organiser of The Concert for Bangladesh
- Birshrestha Nur Mohammad Sheikh, pro-independence fighter of Bangladesh
- Sharif Khasruzzaman, pro-independence fighter of Bangladesh, politician, businessman and member of parliament from 1991 to 1996 and 1996 to 2001
- Major General Sheikh Mohammad Aman Hasan (retd), two-star general in the Bangladesh Army, served as the directorate general (DG) of Special Security Force (SSF)
- Mashrafe Bin Mortoza, former cricketer and captain of the Bangladesh national cricket team, elected as Member of the Parliament
- Suvra Mukherjee, former First Lady of India, wife of former president of India Pranab Mukherjee
- Bijoy Sarkar, poet, baul singer, lyricist, and composer
- Kamal Dasgupta, music director and eminent film composer
- Syed Nausher Ali, politician, founding president of the Workers Party of Bangladesh
- Amal Sen, politician
- Sheikh Abdus Salam, martyred intellectual
- Md. Kabirul Haque, politician, businessman and member of parliament
- Shamoli Ray, archer
- Nihar Ranjan Gupta, Bengali novelist
- Brigadier General (Retd) SK Abu Bakr, Ex Member of Parliament 2008 politician
- Avishek Das (born 5 September 2001), cricketer
- Uday Shankar, famous dancer and choreographer
- SM Shafiuddin Ahmed, former Chief of army staff
- Nihar Ranjan Gupta, famous novelist

== See also ==
- Districts of Bangladesh
