= List of Pakistani architects =

Following is a list of Pakistani architects along with either associated sites of significance or other reasons for their prominence within the field and country. The governing body is the Pakistan Council of Architects and Town Planners.

== A ==
- Habib Fida Ali

== D ==
- Nayyar Ali Dada

== H ==
- Abdur Rahman Hye – (also known as A. R. Hye) – pioneer of institutional architecture in Pakistan

== L ==
- Yasmeen Lari (Karachi) – Pakistan's first woman architect

== M ==
- Mehdi Ali Mirza (1910–1961)
- Nasreddin Murat-Khan (Lahore) – architect of the Minar-e-Pakistan and other structures

== R ==
- Rustom Sohrab Rustomji

== See also ==
- Architecture of Pakistan
- List of architects
- List of Pakistanis
