= Ataur Rahman Khan (BNP politician) =

Bangladeshi politician

Member of Bangladesh Parliament
- In office 1991–1996
- Preceded by: Ataur Rahman Khan
- Succeeded by: Masood Helali

Personal details
- Born: 20th-century Itna, Kishoreganj, Mymensingh district
- Party: Bangladesh Nationalist Party

Ataur Rahman Khan (Bengali: আতাউর রহমান খাঁন) is a Bangladesh Nationalist Party politician and a former member of parliament for Kishoreganj-3.

Khan was a founding member of Harkat-ul-Jihad-al-Islami Bangladesh.

== Career ==
Khan was a founding member of Harkat-ul-Jihad-al-Islami Bangladesh. In 1988, on a tour with senior leaders of Harkat-ul-Jihad-al-Islami Bangladesh, he visited Afghanistan and met with Osama bin Laden. They had flown to Pakistan, where they were hosted by Qari Saifullah Akhtar and were driven by Abdur Rahman Shahi, a Bangladeshi mujahadeen, to Afghanistan.

Khan was elected to parliament from Kishoreganj-3 as a Bangladesh Nationalist Party candidate in 1991. He received 57,671 votes, while his nearest rival, Md. Fazlur Rahman of the Awami League, received 40,205 votes.

== Personal life ==
After the resignation of Prime Minister Sheikh Hasina, his son Waliur Rahman Khan was appointed Khatib of Baitul Mukarram National Mosque, replacing Ruhul Amin.
