= Waliur Rahman Khan =

Waliur Rahman Khan is an Islamic scholar and official of the Baitul Mukarram National Mosque. He is the muhaddis of the Islamic Foundation Bangladesh.

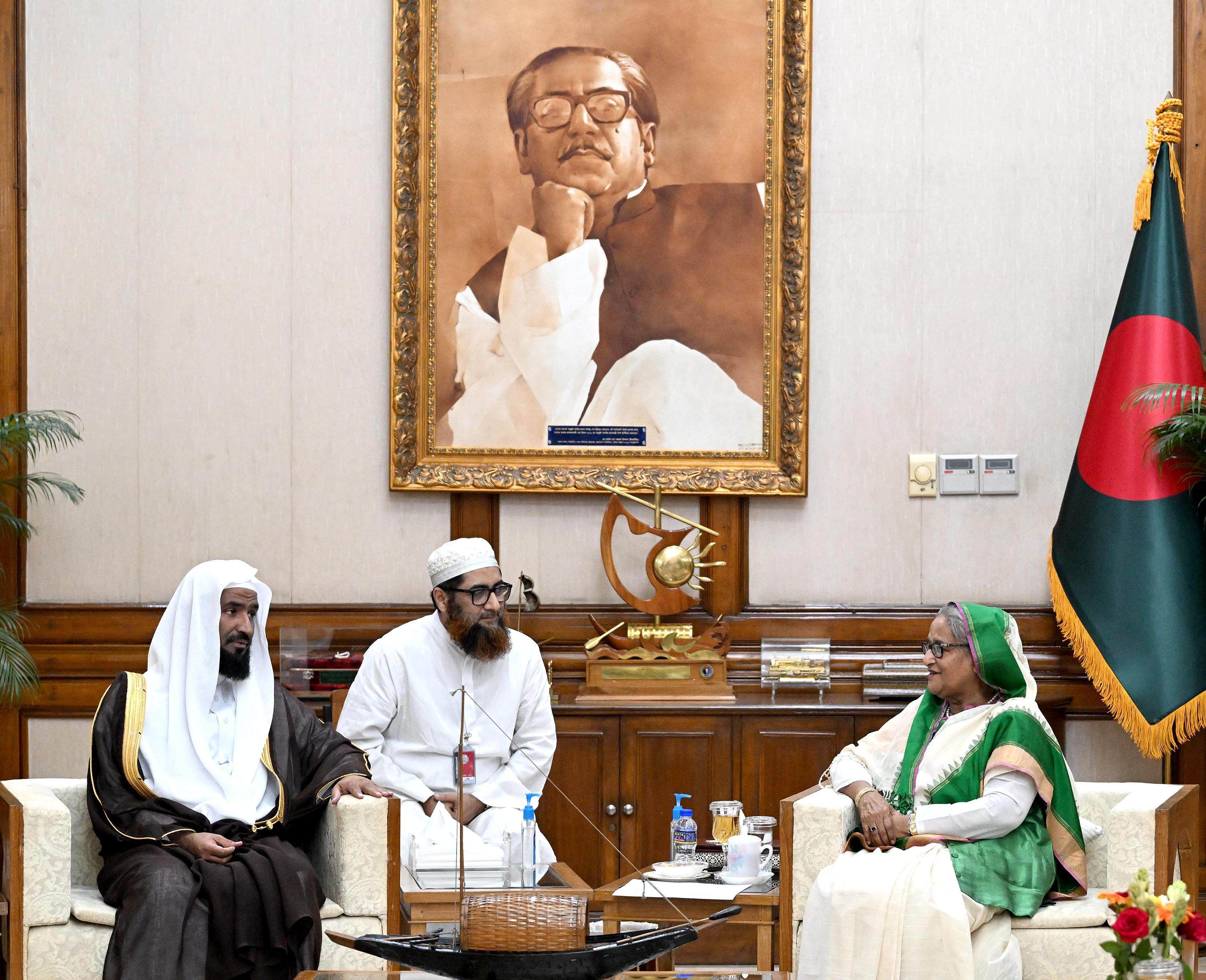
Waliur Rahman Khan (middle) as a translator at Ganabhaban

== Early life ==
Khan's father, Ataur Rahman Khan, was a member of parliament and founding member of Harkat-ul-Jihad-al-Islami Bangladesh. In 1988, Ataur Rahman Khan, on a tour with senior leaders of Harkat-ul-Jihad-al-Islami Bangladesh, visited Afghanistan and met with Osama bin Laden. He completed his PhD at the Islamic University, Bangladesh.

== Career ==
Khan led the fifth Jammat of Eid at the national mosque in 2021.

Khan was appointed to the Shariah Advisory Council of the Bangladesh Securities and Exchange Commission in May 2023. He represented the Islamic Foundation Bangladesh under the Ministry of Religious Affairs.

On 29 August 2024, Khan was appointed temporary Khatib of Baitul Mukarram National Mosque, replacing Ruhul Amin after the fall of the Sheikh Hasina-led Awami League government. The Islamic Foundation denied the media report, saying since Amin had not been since the fall of the last government, Khan and Mufti Maulana Mohammad Abdullah have been leading the prayers at the mosque.
