= Abdulhusein M. Thariani =

Abdul Husein Meheraly Thariani
- عبدالحسین میہر علی تھا رئانی
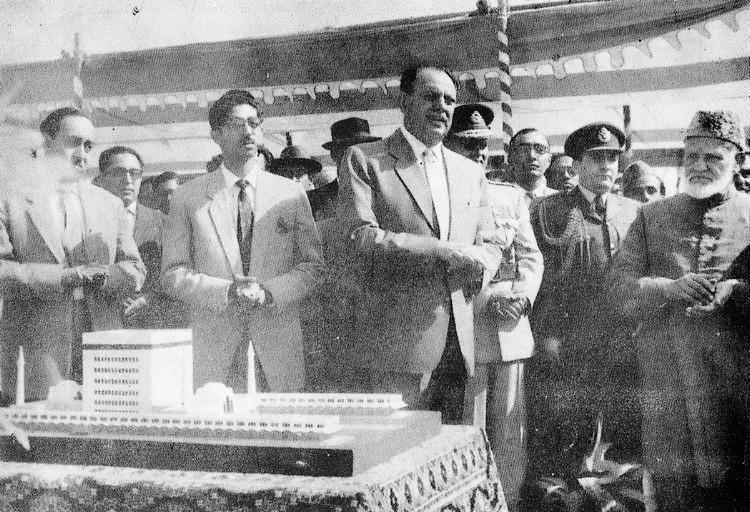
- Thariani at the foundation ceremony of the Baitul Mukarram with President Ayub Khan
- Born: Bombay Presidency, British Raj
- Citizenship: British Raj (1905–1947); Pakistan (1947–1972)
- Education: Sir J. J. School of Art
- Occupation: Architect
- Known for: Architect of Baitul Mukarram
- Spouse: Gulshan
- Children: Sabira Merchant (daughter)

Abdul Husein Meheraly Thariani (3 April 1907 – 30 December 1972) was a member of the first generation of formally trained architects in Pakistan.

== Early life ==
Thariani was born in 1907 in Bombay in British India (now Mumbai, India) as the only child of Fatimabai and Meheraly Thariani.

== Education ==
Thariani attended the J. J. School of Art's Department of Architecture.

== Career ==
His career spanned almost four decades, from 1929 to the late 1960s. In the 1950s, he formed the Institute of Architects, Pakistan, along with 10 other practising architects, including two foreigners: M. A. Ahed, Tajuddin Bhamani, Minoo Mistry, Pir Mohammad, R. S. Rustomji, H. H. Khan, Mehdi Ali Mirza, Zahiruddin Khawaja, Bloomfield, and Peter Powell.

He established his own practice, Abdulhusein M. Thariani, in Bombay in 1929. Amongst his works in the city is the Ambassador Hotel.

After the creation of Pakistan as an independent state in 1947, he moved to Karachi and joined M/s Hyderi Construction Company as its managing director. Under his direction, the first textile mill of Pakistan, Valika Textile Mills, in S.I.T.E., was constructed. In the early 1950s, he left the company to restart his own practice under the name of Thariani & Co.

== Projects ==
In Mumbai

- Ambassador Hotel

In Karachi

- Habib Square (1956)
- Muhammadi House (commercial building)

In Bangladesh

- Sonali Bank Limited, Head Office, Motijheel, Dhaka (former National Bank of Pakistan)
- Adamjee Court (former headquarters in East Pakistan of the Adamjee Group)
- Baitul Mukarram
- Dhaka Improvement Trust Building
- Rajshahi Cadet College (formerly Ayub Cadet College)
- Mirzapur Cadet College (formerly Momenshahi Cadet College)
- Jhenaidah Cadet College
- Residence of Badal Ghosh (owner of Ajax Jute Mill) in Gulshan, Dhaka

== Views ==
Thariani was an active member of the independence movement. He was the editor of the Vatan (1942), a Gujarati language newspaper seeking to gain the support of the business community for the cause of Pakistan.

Besides practising as an architect, Thariani wrote poetry in Gujarati under the pen name of Sabir. His collection of poems was translated into Urdu by the poet Josh Malihabadi and published. One of his poems was included in the Gujarati syllabus at the University of Karachi.

== Personal life ==
Thariani was married to Gulshan; amongst their children are the Pakistani architects Saleem Thariani and Azad Thariani. His grandson Kumail is also an architect. His daughter Sabira Merchant is an actress and etiquette trainer in India.
