= Alamgir Hossain =

Alamgir Hossain is the name of:

- Alamgir Hossain (politician) (fl. 1988–1990), Bangladeshi politician
- Alamgir Hossain (hurdler), Bangladeshi hurdler - see 2017 Asian Athletics Championships – Men's 400 metres hurdles
