= Ahed =

Ahed (Arabic: عهد) is Arabic for covenant or vow.

Ahed may also refer to:

== Organizations ==
- Al Ahed FC, an association football club based in Beirut, Lebanon
  - Al Ahed Stadium, a stadium in Beirut, Lebanon

== People ==
=== People with the given name ===
- Ahed Joughili (born 1984), Syrian weightlifter
- Ahed Tamimi (born 2001), Palestinian activist

=== People with the surname ===
- Mohammad Abdul Ahed (1919–2001), Pakistani architect and painter
