= Itna Upazila =

Itna ইটনা
- Upazila
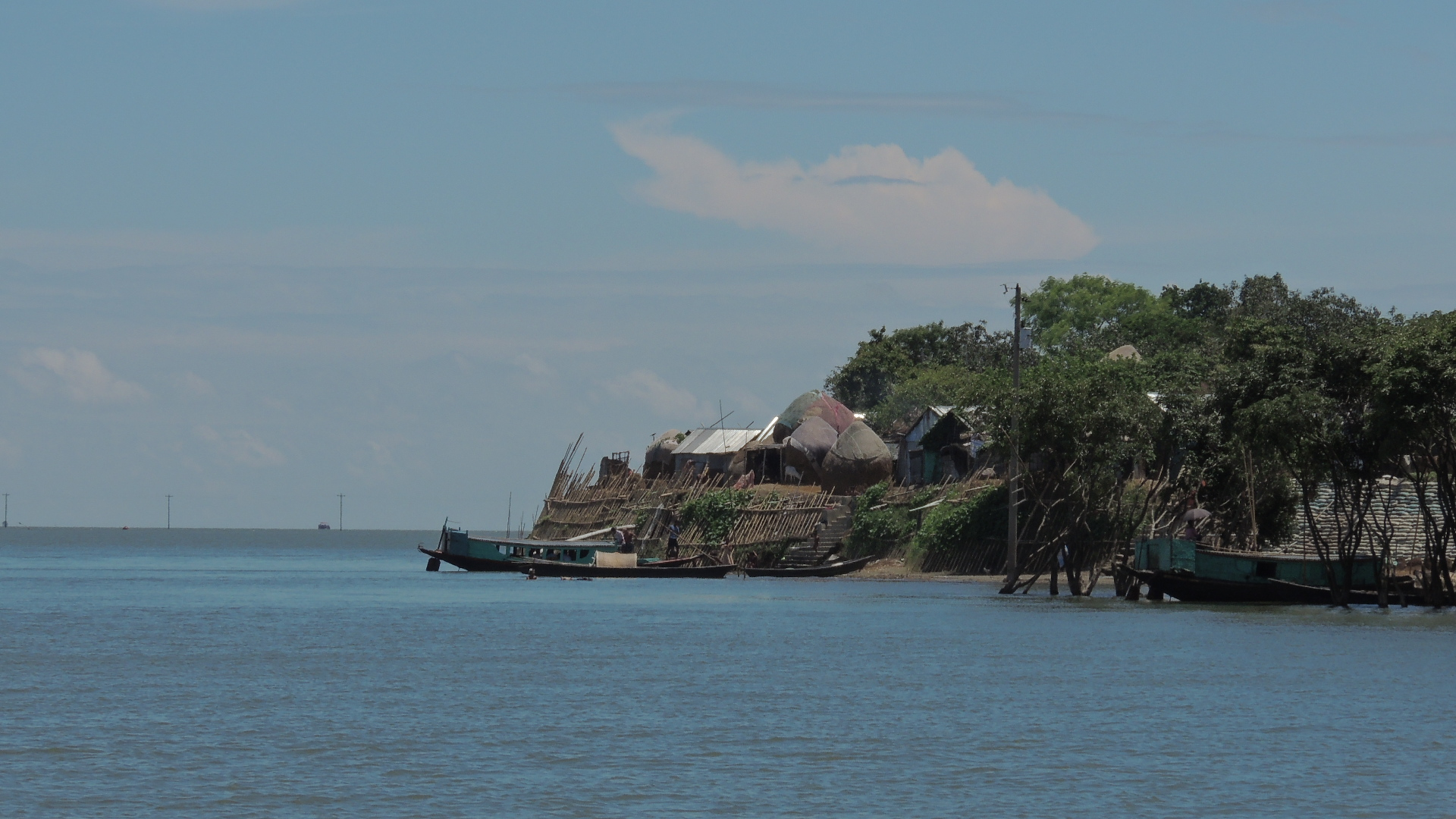
- Houses along the edge of a Haor in Itna

- Coordinates: 24°32′N 91°5′E
- Country: Bangladesh
- Division: Dhaka
- District: Kishoreganj
- Thana: 1917
- Upazila: 1983

Government
  - MP (Kishoreganj-4): Rejwan Ahammad Taufiq (Bangladesh Awami League)
  - Upazila Chairman: Chowdhury Kamrul Hasan

Area
  - Total: 401.93 km^{2} (155.19 sq mi)

Population (2022)
  - Total: 168,840
  - Density: 420.07/km^{2} (1,088.0/sq mi)
- Time zone: UTC+6 (BST)
- Postal Codes: 2390
- Area code: 09426
- Website: itna.kishoreganj.gov.bd

Itna Upazila mauza geocode map

Itna (Bengali: ইটনা) is an upazila of Kishoreganj District in the Division of Dhaka, Bangladesh. Itna Upazila is one of the largest upazilas in Bangladesh by area. The reason for its spread is the massive Haor area.

== History ==
In 1864, a police outpost was founded in the village of Badla, 6 km west of Itna Sadar. This outpost was disestablished on 15 June 1906 following the gazette notification 6676 which announced that a full-fledged thana (police station) would be established in Itna. Khwaja Hafizullah, founder of the Dhaka Nawab family, purchased some land in Itna Pargana. During the Bangladesh Liberation War of 1971, a number of people were killed in the village of Boira in Joysiddhi Union. In 1984, Mithamain Upazila was split off from the southern part of the Upazila.

== Geography ==
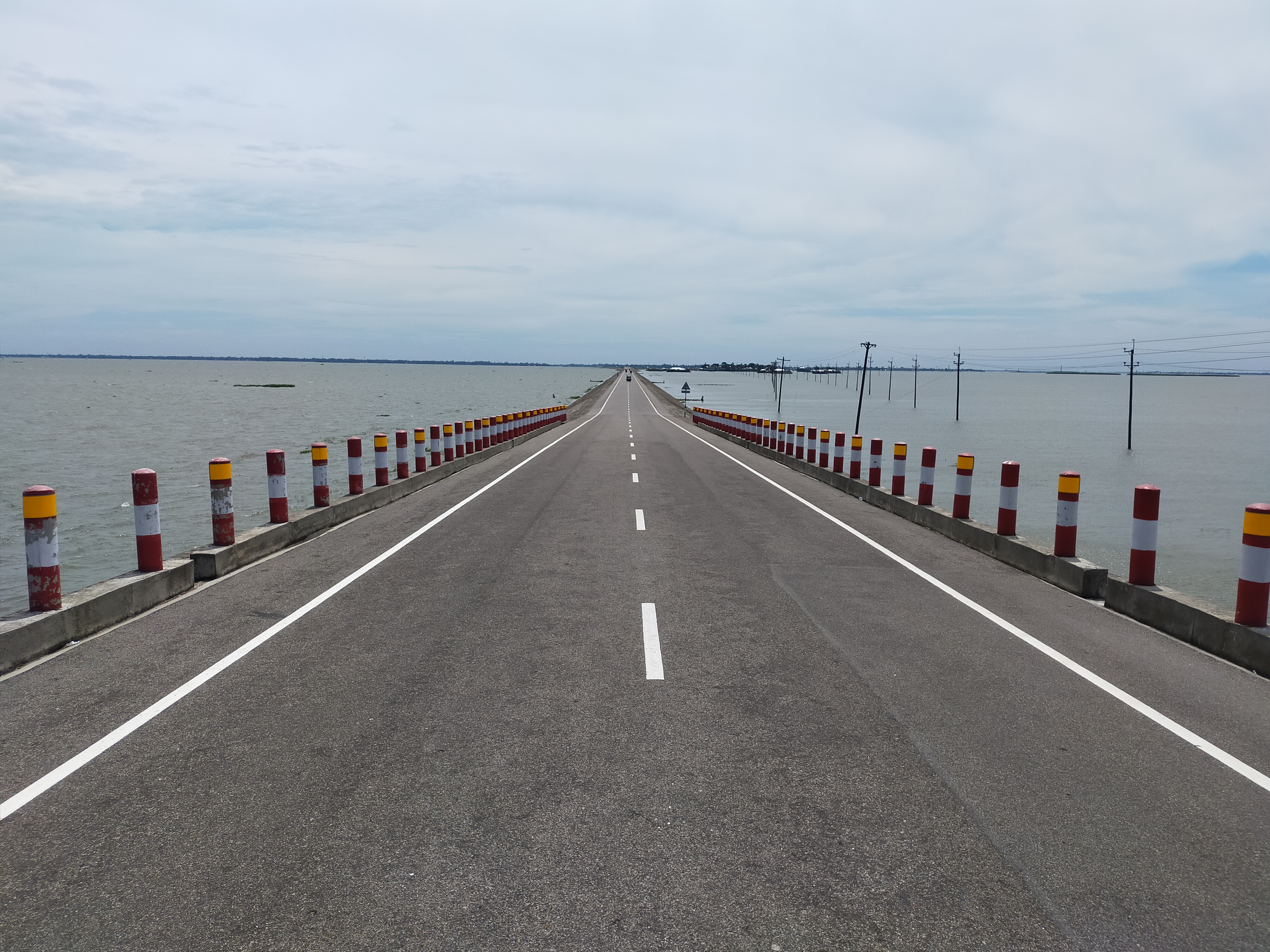
অল ওয়েদার রোড, ইটনা - All-weather road, Itna

To the west of Itna Upazila are Karimganj and Tarail upazilas, to the north are Madan and Khaliajuri upazilas of Netrokona district, to the east are Shalla upazila of Sunamganj district and Ajmiriganj upazila of Habiganj district and to the south is Mithamain upazila.

The Dhanpur union, Itna Sadar union, and Elongjuri union are located on the riversides of the Dhanu River. The Haor region of Itna Upazila is blessed by the river. It's a source of life, enriching the land and the people who call it home.

Itna is located in between 24°27' and 24°39' north latitude and in between 90°57' and 91°57' east longitude. It has 34,637 households and its total area is approximately 401.93 square km.

== Rivers and Water Bodies ==
Rivers:

1. Surma River
2. Dhanu River
3. Ghorautra River
4. Baulai River
5. Kalni River

Water Bodies and Haors:

1. Uttorer (Northern) Haor (Itna Sadar)
2. Dokshiner (Southern) Haor (Itna Sadar)
3. Puber (Eastern) Haor (Itna Sadar)
4. Poshchimer (Western) Haor (Itna Sadar)
5. Saniya Beel (Dhanpur)
6. Haular Haor
7. Maora Beel
8. Chapra Beel
9. Kaira Beel
10. Ugli Beel
11. Sonabandha Beel
12. Ghora Beel
13. Agalpa Beel

== Economy and tourism ==
Agriculture in the winter, spring, and summer seasons and fishing in the rainy and autumn seasons are the main sources of income for Itna Upazila. Main sources of income are agriculture (77.84%), non-agricultural laborers (3.45%), industry (0.32%), commerce (6.40%), transport and communication (0.37%), service (1.93%), construction (0.41%), religious service (0.30%), rent and remittance (0.16%), and others (4.86%). There are many local mysteries about the construction of Itna Madhyagram Jame Masjid, which has gained the status of gayebi masjid and made it a place of attraction. The dargah of the five pirs in Mirdhahati as well as the Badshahi Mosque are also popular places in Itna.

== Demographics ==
According to the 2022 Bangladeshi census, Itna Upazila had 37,650 households and a population of 168,840. 12.17% of the population were under 5 years of age. Itna had a literacy rate (age 7 and over) of 56.45%: 57.35% for males and 55.53% for females, and a sex ratio of 101.52 males for every 100 females. 15,307 (9.07%) lived in urban areas.

According to the 2011 Census of Bangladesh, Itna Upazila had 34,637 households and a population of 164,127. 50,518 (30.78%) were under 10 years of age. Itna had a literacy rate (age 7 and over) of 27.69%, compared to the national average of 51.8%, and a sex ratio of 959 females per 1000 males. 22,669 (13.81%) lived in urban areas.

As of the 1991 Bangladesh census, Itna has a population of 132948. Males constitute 52.14% of the population, and females 47.86%. This Upazila's eighteen up population is 63852. Itna has an average literacy rate of 16% (7+ years), and the national average of 32.4% literate.

=== Religion ===
Religions in Itna Upazila (2022)
| Religion | Percent |
| Islam | 87.17% |
| Hinduism | 12.83% |
| Other or not stated | 0.003% |

Population by religion in Union
| Union | Muslim | Hindu | Others |
|---|---|---|---|
| Badla Union | 16,376 | 784 | 0 |
| Baribari Union | 11,476 | 591 | 0 |
| Chouganga Union | 17,058 | 76 | 0 |
| Dhanpur Union | 2,408 | 10,220 | 1 |
| Elangjuri Union | 14,781 | 735 | 3 |
| Itna Union | 22,323 | 3,222 | 1 |
| Jaysiddhi Union | 17,939 | 1,525 | 2 |
| Mriga Union | 21,705 | 2,398 | 1 |
| Raytuti Union | 23,099 | 2,104 | 1 |

🟩 Muslim majority 🟧 Hindu majority In 2001, Muslims constituted 83.81% of the population, Hindus constituted 15.47%, and others constituted 0.72% of the total population of 151,571. In 2011, the percentage of Muslims increased to 85.35% while Hindus were 14.55% of the population.

There are 250 mosques, 7 Hindu temples, 6 tombs, and 4 akhras.

== Educational Institutions ==
Educational institutions: 1 college, 11 secondary schools, 93 primary schools, 3 kindergartens, 21 madrasas, and 137 maktabs.

Notable educational institutions:

- Rashtrapati Abdul Hamid Government College (1998) (Previously Itna College )
- Mahesh Chandra Government Model Shiksha Niketon (1943)
- Thaneshwar High School (1947)
- Joysiddhi High School (1974)
- Itna Pilot Girls' High School (1984)
- Chauganga Fazil Madrasa (1962).

== Main Crops and Exports ==
The main crops are rice, mustard seed, china nut, potato, and vegetables. Main exports are paddy, fish, potatoes, china nuts, cows, goats, and dried fish.

== Bazars and Haats ==
- Puran Bazar (Itna Sadar)
- Natun Bazar (Itna Sadar)
- Elongjuri Bazar
- Dhanpur Bazar
- Joysiddhi Bazar

== Administration ==
Itna Upazila is divided into nine union parishads: Badla, Baribari, Chuaganga, Dhanpur, Elongjuri, Itna, Joysiddhi, Mriga, and Raituti. The union parishads are subdivided into 93 mauzas and 116 villages.

=== List of Upazila Chairmen ===
List of chairmen
| Name | Term |
|---|---|
| Muhammad Ershad Uddin Milki Raytuti | 1984-1989 |
| Shahab Uddin Thakur Itnai | 1989-1991 |
| Muhammad Aminul Islam Ratan Panchkahani | 2009-2013 |
| Chowdhury Kamrul Hasan | present |

== Notable people ==
- bn:সিরাজুল ইসলাম (বীর বিক্রম)
- Ataur Rahman Khan, politician
- Fazal-ur-Rehman (Kishoreganj politician)

== See also ==
- Upazilas of Bangladesh
- Districts of Bangladesh
- Divisions of Bangladesh
