= Rustomji =

Rustomji is a name. Notable people with the name include:

- Rustomji Jamshedji (1892–1976), Indian Test cricketer
- Rustom Sohrab Rustomji (1917– c. 2016), Pakistani architect
- Kharshedji Rustomji Cama (1831–1909), Indian Parsi scholar
- Hilla Rustomji Faridoonji (1872–1956), Indian educationist
