= Mehdi Ali Mirza =

Pakistani architect

Mehdi Ali Mirza (7 August 1910, Hyderabad State – 27 October 1961) or M. A. Mirza, was amongst the first generation of formally trained architects in Pakistan.

He laid the foundation for the establishment of the profession in the new country of Pakistan. He was also the prime mover behind the establishment of the Institute of Architects, Pakistan (IAP) in 1957.

== Early life and career ==
Mehdi Ali Mirza was born on 7 August 1910 to an officer of the forest service in Hyderabad State (Hyderabad Deccan), British India. He studied architecture at the Sir J. J. School of Art in Mumbai, India. Then he taught at the Delhi Polytechnic's department of architecture till 1947. He migrated to Pakistan in 1947 and joined the Public Works Department in Karachi and became the first principal of PWD School of Architecture in 1954.

According to a major website on Architecture, "Mirza fought hard to gain recognition for architecture as a profession distinct from engineering, insisting that he needed trained architects, not engineers". Finally, in 1954, he succeeded in gaining permission to introduce and start 'School of Architecture' at the Institute of Architects, Pakistan, in Karachi. Mirza was appointed to the position of 'Principal' at this new school to give him the opportunity to further develop it. Later, due to his untiring efforts and in recognition of his services, he was elected the president of this institute in 1957.

Mirza was influenced by the style of Frank Lloyd Wright. After arriving in Karachi at independence of Pakistan, he started his career with the Public Works Department in 1947.

In 1957, he was among 11 practising architects, including two foreigners, who formed the Institute of Architects, Pakistan. The other founders of the institute were: M. A. Ahed, Tajuddin Bhamani, Minoo Mistry, Pir Mohammad, R. S. Rustomji, H. H. Khan, Abdulhusein M. Thariani, Zahiruddn Khawaja, Bloomfield and Peter Powell.

== Death ==
In 1960, Mirza developed cancer and went to England for treatment in January 1961. Mirza later died of cancer on 27 October 1961 in England at age 51.

== Awards and recognition ==
- In 1962, he was posthumously awarded the Pride of Performance Award by the President of Pakistan for his contributions in the field of architecture.

== Publications ==
- Mankani, Zain and Shikoh, Murtuza(eds), "Pioneer of Architecture in Pakistan - Architect Mehdi Ali Mirza. Karachi: Arch Press. 2013 978-969-9803-00-0 (monograph)
