= Dhanu River =

Coordinates: 24°22′N 91°01′E

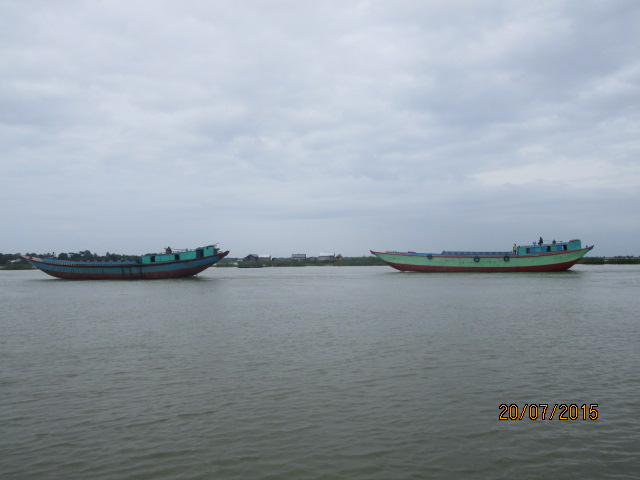
- Dhanu River at Khaliajuri Upazila

Location
- Country: Bangladesh
- Division: Sylhet; Mymensingh
- Districts: Sunamganj; Netrokona; Kishoreganj

Physical characteristics
- Source: Baulai River
- Mouth: Ghorautra River
- Length: 90 km (56 mi)
- Basin size: 24,059.9 km^{2} (9,289.6 sq mi)
- Discharge
  - location: Near mouth
  - average: (Period: 1970 to 2000)2,462.7 m^{3}/s (86,970 cu ft/s)

The Dhanu (Bengali: ধানু, romanized: Dhānu), also called the Ghorautra, is a river in Bangladesh and a tributary of the Meghna. It flows directly southwards from Sunamganj in Sylhet through the eastern thanas of Netrakona and Itna Upazila of the district of Kishoreganj of Mymensingh Region. It flows through the Dhanpur, Itna Sadar, and Elongjuri union of the Itna Upazila. It is navigable the year round. It falls and rises with the daily tides and even the canals connected with it a long way inland, at places like Gag Bazar and Badla, experience the effect of these tides.
