= Masood Helali =

Bangladeshi politician

- মাসুদ হিলালী

Member of Parliament for Kishoreganj-3
- In office 15 February 1996 – 12 June 1996
- Preceded by: Ataur Rahman Khan
- Succeeded by: Sayed Ashraful Islam

Personal details
- Born: Kishoreganj District
- Party: Bangladesh Nationalist Party

Masood Helali is a Bangladesh Nationalist Party politician. He was elected a member of parliament from Kishoreganj-3 in February 1996.

== Career ==
Masood Helali is a former general secretary and advisor of the Kishoreganj district Bangladesh Nationalist Party (BNP). He was elected to parliament from Kishoreganj-3 as a BNP candidate in the 15 February 1996 Bangladeshi general election.

He was defeated in the Kishoreganj-3 constituency on 12 June 1996 and 2001 on the nomination of the Bangladesh Nationalist Party.
