= Kishoreganj-3 =

Constituency of Bangladesh's Jatiya Sangsad

- Constituency for the Jatiya Sangsad
- District: Kishoreganj District
- Division: Dhaka Division

Current constituency
- Created: 1984
- Member of Parliament: vacant
- ← 163 Kishoreganj-2 165 Kishoreganj-4 →

Kishoreganj-3 is a constituency represented in the Jatiya Sangsad (National Parliament) of Bangladesh.

== Boundaries ==
The constituency encompasses Tarail, and Karimganj upazilas.

== Members of Parliament ==
Election	Member	Party
1986	Fazlur Rahman	Jatiya Party
1988	Alamgir Hossain	Jatiya Party
1991	Ataur Rahman Khan	BNP
Feb 1996	Masood Helali	BNP
Jun 1996	Sayed Ashraful Islam	Awami League
2001	Sayed Ashraful Islam	Awami League
2008	Mujibul Haque	Jatiya Party
2026	Osman Faruk	BNP
