= Rustom Sohrab Rustomji =

Rustom Sohrab Rustomji (30 August 1917 – c. 2016) was a Pakistani architect.

== Life and career ==
=== Early life ===
Rustomji was born in Karachi on 30 August 1917.

=== Institute of Architects, Pakistan ===
In the 1950s, he along with 10 other practising architects, including two foreigners, formed the Institute of Architects, Pakistan. The other founders of the Institute were: M. A. Ahed, Tajuddin Bhamani, Minoo Mistry, Pir Mohammad, Abdulhusein M. Thariani, H. H. Khan, Mehdi Ali Mirza, Zahiruddn Khawaja, Bloomfield and Peter Powell. He signed the Institute's Memorandum of Association.

=== Before 1947 ===
In late 1943, he became the state architect of Bikaner.

=== After 1947 ===
In 1947, after independence of Pakistan was announced, he was offered a partnership in the firm, D.H. Daruvala & Co in Karachi and moved back to the city. He remained with the firm thereafter.

Rustomji died around 2016.
