= Fazlur Rahman (Bangladeshi politician) =

Bangladeshi politician

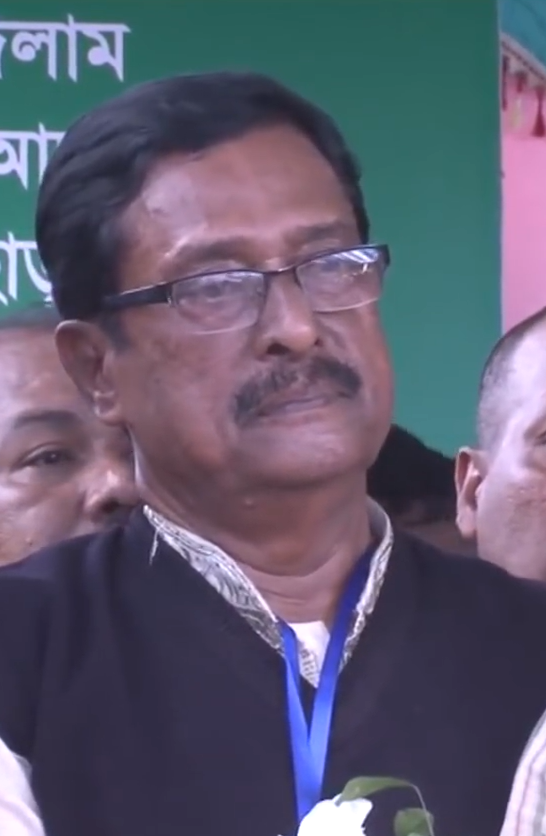
- Rehman in 2016

Member of Parliament
- Incumbent
- Assumed office 17 February 2026
- Preceded by: Rejwan Ahmed Toufiq
- Constituency: Kishoreganj-4
- In office 7 May 1986 – 3 March 1988
- Succeeded by: Alamgir Hossain
- Constituency: Kishoreganj-3

Personal details
- Born: 1950 (age 75–76) Kishoreganj, East Pakistan
- Party: Bangladesh Nationalist Party (1988 - current); Jatiya Party (Ershad) (former); Bangladesh Awami League (former)

Military service
- Allegiance: Bangladesh
- Branch/service: Mukti Bahini
- Unit: Mujib Bahini
- Battles/wars: Bangladesh Liberation War

Momammadd Fazlur Rahman (Bengali: মোঃ ফজলুর রহমান), is a Bangladeshi politician and lawyer who serves as a Member of Parliament for Kishoreganj-4. He was the advisor of Khaleda Zia during her tenure.

== Political life ==
Rahman started his political life as a student leader. He was the president and general secretary of Bangladesh Chhatra League. Then he joined the party Bangladesh Awami League. He joined the BNP in 1979 and became a member of the Union Parishad in the 1980 elections of Ziaur Rahman. After the 1982 coup, he joined Jatiya Party (Ershad) and was elected to the parliament from Kishoreganj-3 as a Jatiya Party candidate in 1986.

Later he joined BNP in 1988 and became the president of the Kishoreganj District unit of Bangladesh Nationalist Party as well as Union Council Chairman from 1992 onwards. However, on 26 August 2025, he was suspended from all party posts for 3 months.

== Controversy ==
=== July Revolution ===
Following the July Revolution, Rahman stated in various forums that the collapse of the government was orchestrated by Bangladesh Jamaat-e-Islami and its affiliated organisations. He argued that the events were not an ordinary political development but a premeditated conspiracy, describing Jamaat as the "dark force" behind it.

=== International Crimes Tribunal ===
In December 2024, he was accused of contempt of court over remarks concerning the International Crimes Tribunal. Following an unconditional apology submitted to the tribunal, he was discharged from the charges.

=== Outbursts ===
He has often come under controversy for going into anger outbursts and making controversial remarks, for which he has been given the nickname Fozu Pagla (Bengali: ফজু পাগলা, lit. 'Lunatic Fozu'), where Fozu is derived from his name Fazlur. He has also come under controversy for making similar outbursts in the parliament, which has been deemed as 'unparliamentary.'
