= Habib Fida Ali =

Pakistani architect

- Born: 1935; Karachi, Pakistan
- Died: 7 January 2017 (aged 81–82); Karachi, Pakistan
- Occupation: Architect

Habib Fida Ali (1935 – 7 January 2017) (Urdu: حبیب فدا علی) was one of Pakistan's most prominent architects, working in the modernist tradition.

== Early life ==
Fida Ali was born to a Dawoodi Bohra family in Karachi and attended St. Patrick's primary school there, before in 1952 becoming a boarder at Aitchison College, Lahore, to take his O and A levels examinations. He then became the first Pakistani student to be admitted to the Architectural Association School of Architecture in London, from where he graduated in 1962. He returned to Pakistan in 1963 to join William Perry's architectural practice in Karachi, and established his own practice in 1965.

== Career ==
Habib Fida Ali had worked on the following buildings and architectural projects.

=== Corporate projects ===
- Shell House (Completed in 1976 First Prize in Limited Competition)
- Commercial Union (Completed in 1992)
- National Bank of Pakistan Head Office Building (Renovation)
- Cavish Court, Karachi (completed in 1987)
- Sui Southern Gas Company Head Office Building
- Sui Northern Gas Company Head Office Building, Lahore (completed in 1989)
- Commercial Union Assurance Regional Office Building, Karachi (completed in 1992)

=== Hospitality projects ===
- Midway House Hotel at Karachi Airport (completed in 1982) (Phase I & 2003 -2006 Phase II)
- Memon Medical Institute (completed in 2010)
- Infaq Medical Center (completed in 2006)
- Bait-ul-Sukoon Cancer Hospital (completed in 2007)
- Master Plan JS Hospital, Sehwan, Sindh, Pakistan (completed in 2012)
- Police Hospital, Garden Road, Karachi (completed in 2012)

=== Educational projects ===
- Lahore University of Management Sciences (completed 1985)

== Honors and distinctions ==
- Lifetime Achievement Award by the Institute of Architects, Pakistan
- Nominated for the Aga Khan Award for Architecture 1986
- Speaker at the forum 2001 at Sri Lankan Institute of Architects, Colombo, Sri Lanka, to speak on his Fair Face Concrete Buildings.
- Karachi conformance of Building & Material Exhibition My Architects – Our Architecture IAPEX 2004
- Designed Karachi American School building along with William Perry in 1962

== Professional affiliations ==
- National Vice President of the Institute of Architects, Pakistan (IAP)
- Member, Master Jury, Aga Khan Award for Architecture, 1983

== Death ==
Habib Fida Ali died on 7 January 2017. The cause of death was reported to be brain hemorrhage.
