= Sabira Merchant =

Indian actress and etiquette trainer

- Born: 4 August 1942 (age 84); Bombay (Mumbai)
- Known for: Etiquette training
- Father: Abdulhusein M. Thariani

Sabira Merchant (née Vazirali) (born 4 August 1942) is a Miss India trainer and actor based in Mumbai. She is a top etiquette trainer in India.

== Background ==
Merchant was born in Bombay as the fifth child of Goolshen and Abdulhusein M. Thariani. She was adopted by her maternal uncle and given the surname, Vazirali. She was sent to a finishing school in Switzerland. She is married to Chotu Merchant.

== Career ==
She started acting as a theatre artiste in Bombay. In the 1970s, she became very popular on the television with her show What’s the good word?, which ran for a record 15 years on Doordarshan. The theme music for the show was Glenn Miller's version of American Patrol.

She later became a trainer and was very successful. She played the enchantress, Madame Manaeksha, in the BBC production Six steps to happiness. She has trained celebrities like Priyanka Chopra, Lara Dutta, Diana Hayden, Akshata Prabhu, Yukta Mookhey and many more on international beauty pageants.

Her memoir, A Full Life, was published in 2022.

She is also featured in the documentary "The world before her", as she is training young women for Miss India pageant.
