= Alamgir Hossain (politician) =

Bangladeshi politician

Member of Bangladesh Parliament
- In office 1988–1990

Personal details
- Party: Jatiya Party (Ershad)

Alamgir Hossain (Bengali: আলমগীর হোসেন) is a Jatiya Party (Ershad) politician in Bangladesh and a former member of parliament for Kishoreganj-3.

== Career ==
Hossain was elected to parliament from Kishoreganj-3 as a Jatiya Party candidate in 1988. He was known as the "architect of Kishorganj" for turning it into a city. His legacy was carried on by his son Shiblu Alamgir Hossain who also worked to develop Kishorganj City.
