= Ruhul Amin (scholar) =

Bangladeshi Islamic scholar and Khatib of National Mosque

Mufti Ruhul Amin
- রুহুল আমিন
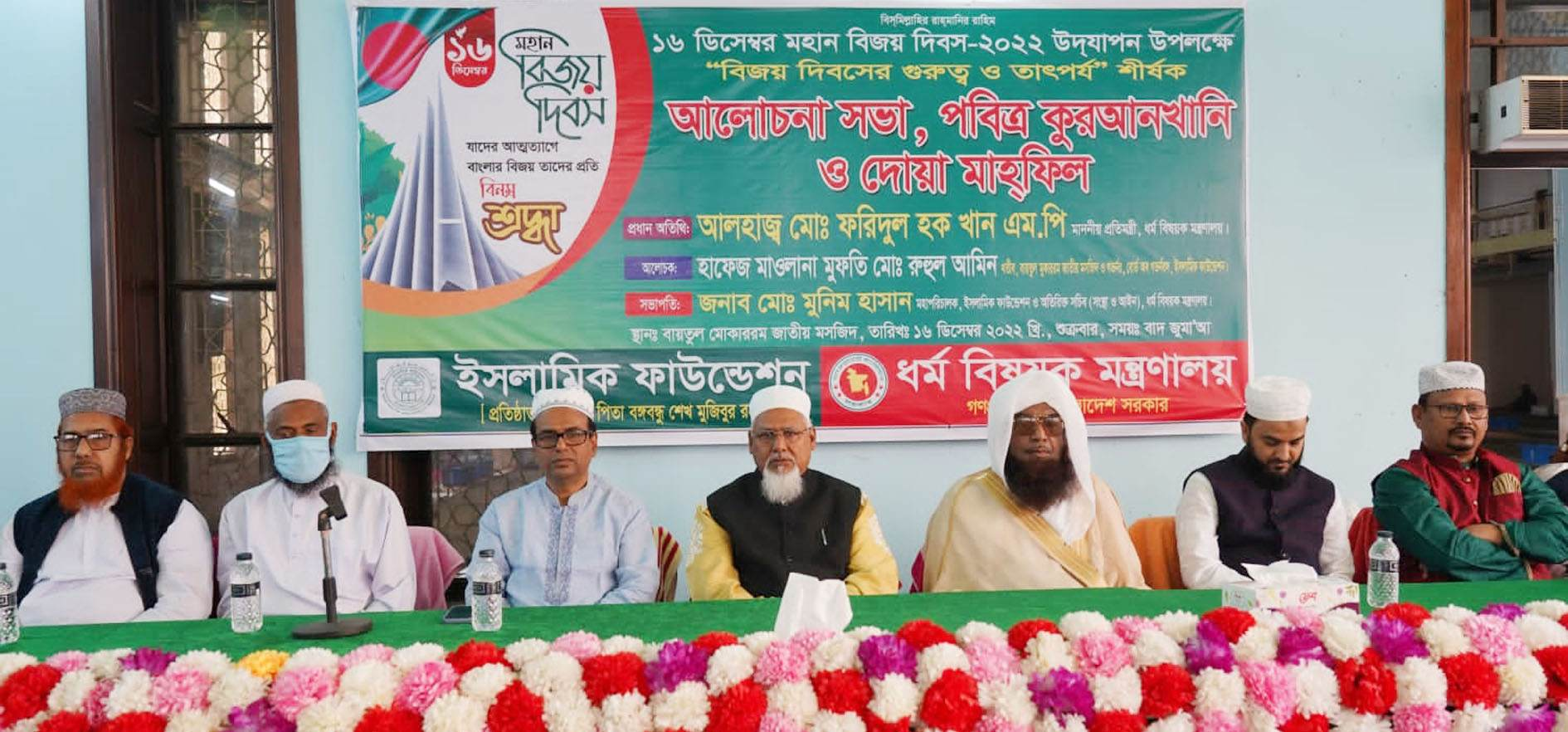
- Amin in 2022 (3rd from Left)

Personal life
- Born: 12 March 1962 (age 64) Gowhardanga, Tungipara, Gopalganj, East Pakistan
- Parent: Shamsul Haque Faridpuri (father)

Religious life
- Religion: Islam
- Denomination: Sunni
- Jurisprudence: Hanafi
- Movement: Deobandi

Khatib of Baitul Mukarram National Mosque
- In office 31 March 2022 – 22 September 2024
- Preceded by: Mohammad Salahuddin
- Succeeded by: Muhammad Abdul Malek

Muhtamim of Gowhardanga Madrasa
- Incumbent
- Assumed office 2003

Personal details
- Party: Awami League

Ruhul Amin (Bengali: রুহুল আমিন; born 12 March 1962) is a Bangladeshi Islamic scholar and educator. He was served as the Khatib of Baitul Mukarram National Mosque of Bangladesh. He is the Muhtamim (vice chancellor) of Gowhardanga Madrasa.

== Early life and family ==
Ruhul Amin was born on 12 March 1962 to a Bengali Muslim family in the village of Gowhardanga in Tungipara, Gopalganj, then part of East Pakistan's Faridpur district. His father was the Islamic scholar Shamsul Haque Faridpuri and they trace their paternal ancestry to an Arab soldier who was part of Bakhtiyar Khalji's army during his conquest of Bengal. His ancestors settled in Jessore where they propagated Islam. His grandfather's great-grandfather, Mawlana Abdul Awwal al-Ghazi, relocating the family to Faridpur. Ruhul Amin's grandfather's grandfather, Chand Ghazi, was a student of Syed Ahmad Shaheed and took part in the Battle of Balakot against the Sikhs. His grandfather, Muhammad Abdullah ibn Chiragh Ali, was a munshi and participant of the Indian Rebellion of 1857.

== Education ==
He studied at the Jamia Islamia Darul Uloom Khademul Islam in Gowhardanga, where he completed his hifz and Hadith (Masters) at Daora and Ifta.

== Career ==
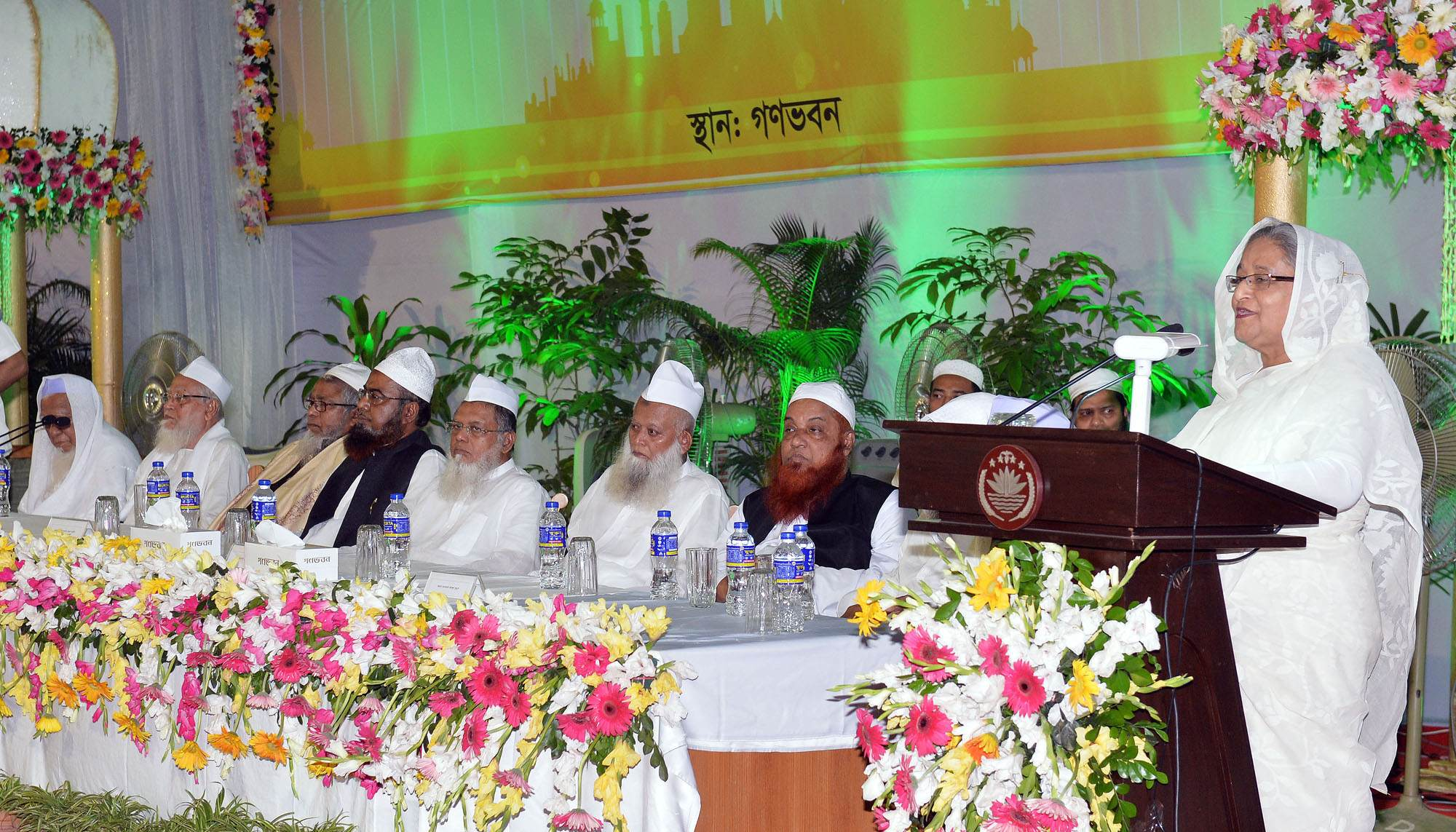

Ruhul Amin has been the vice chancellor of Gowhardanga Madrasa since 2003. He is the President of Befaqul Madarisil Qawmia Gowhardanga Bangladesh and a permanent member of Al-Haiatul Ulya Lil-Jamiatil Qawmia Bangladesh, the highest authority of Qawmi Madrasa. On 31 March 2022, he was nominated Khatib of Baitul Mukarram National Mosque. He is the Governor of the Board of Government of the Islamic Foundation Bangladesh.

Amin is the editor of the monthly Al-Ashraf. He assisted the court as Amicus Curiae, the country's top scholar in ruling on the validity of the fatwa. He was expecting the nomination of Awami League from Narail-1 constituency in the Eleventh Parliamentary Election. He was instrumental in the official recognition of the Qawmi Madrasa Charter.

Amin was removed from the post of Khatib of Baitul Mukarram National Mosque. On 20 September a clash broke out at the Baitul Mukarram National Mosque between his followers and Imam Abu Saleh Patwari. On 19 November 2026, he was detained from Bashundhara Residential Area by Special Response Battalion.

== Criticism ==
Ruhul Amin was heavily criticised for referring to then Prime Minister Sheikh Hasina as "Qaumi Janani" during a speech at the Suhrawardy Udyan on 4 November 2018. His words regarding Hasina were,

"You have recognized Bangabandhu's daughter, ignoring everything. You have found yourself in many embarrassing situations, and you have responded to them. You (Sheikh Hasina) have played the role of the mother of 1.4 million students. Today, I want to declare in the ocean of Qaumi that you are the mother of the Qaumi. From today, I have given you this title. If it were not for your maternal role, the anti-nationals, enemies of the companions, Jamaat-Maududists would not have allowed this (recognition) to happen in this country."

== See also ==
- List of Deobandis
