= Baitul Mukarram =

National Mosque of Bangladesh

Baitul Mukarram National Mosque
- বায়তুল মোকাররম জাতীয় মসজিদ
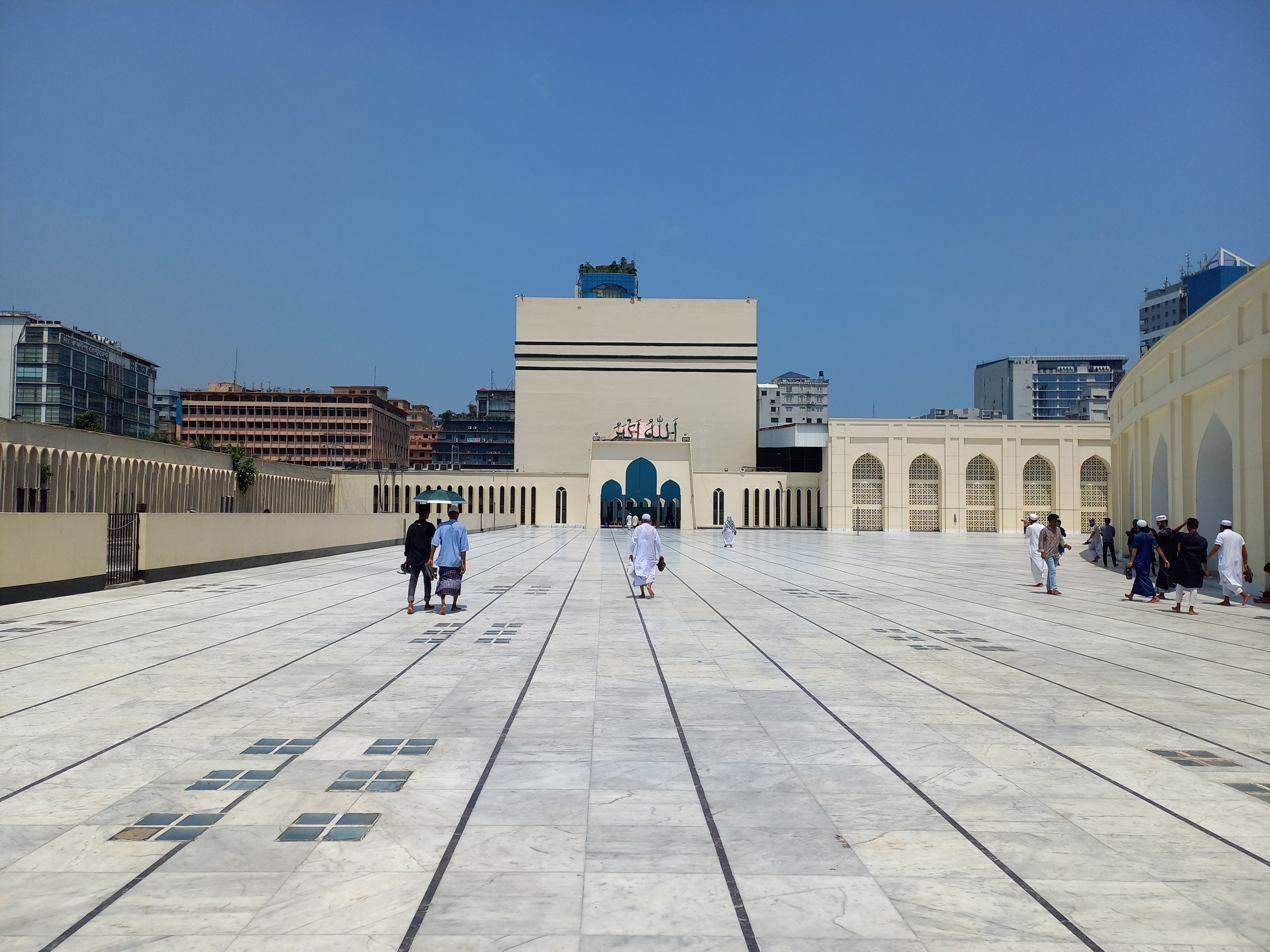
- Baitul Mukarram, the National Mosque of Bangladesh is designed in the style of the Kaaba of Mecca

- Location within Dhaka Location within Dhaka division Location within Bangladesh

Religion
- Affiliation: Islam
- District: Dhaka District
- Ownership: Government of East Pakistan (1959-71); Government of Bangladesh (since 1971)
- Year consecrated: 1959; 67 years ago
- Status: Active

Location
- Location: Topkhana Road, Paltan Dhaka
- Country: Bangladesh
- Interactive map of Baitul Mukarram National Mosque
- Administration: Ministry of Religious Affairs
- Coordinates: 23°43′46″N 90°24′46″E

Architecture
- Architect: Abdulhusein M. Thariani
- Type: Neo-islamic
- Style: Islamic Architecture
- Founder: Government of East Pakistan
- Funded by: Abdul Latif Ibrahim Bhawani
- General contractor: Thariani & Co.
- Groundbreaking: 27 January 1960; 66 years ago
- Completed: 1968

Specifications
- Capacity: 42,000+
- Height (max): 99 feet

Website
- Baitul Mukarram Mosque. Bangladesh National Tourism Board, website

Baitul Mukarram, (Note: Bengali: বায়তুল মোকাররম, lit. 'The Honored House') officially Baitul Mukarram National Mosque, (Note: Bengali: বায়তুল মোকাররম জাতীয় মসজিদ) is the national mosque of Bangladesh. It is located at the center of Dhaka, the capital of Bangladesh. The mosque was completed in 1968. It has a capacity of more than 42,000 worshippers.

== History ==
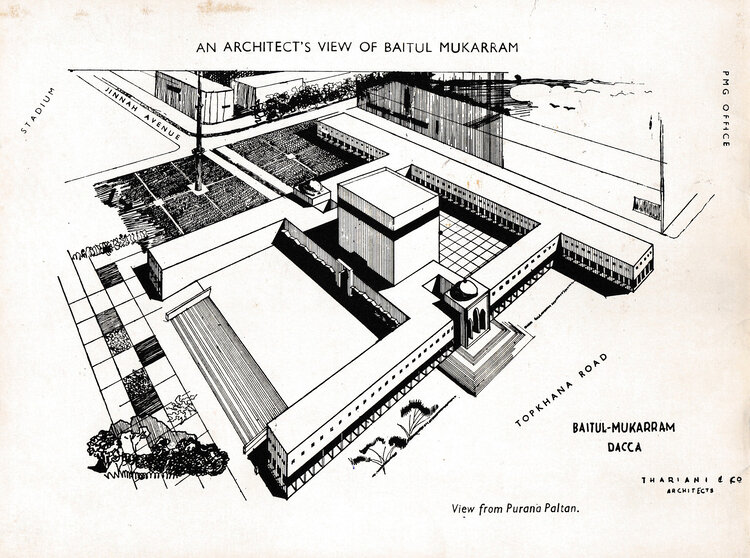
An architect's view of Baitul Mukarram

The mosque complex was designed by architect Abdulhusein M. Thariani. On 27 April 1959, Abdul Latif Ibrahim Bawani, owner of then Bawani Jute Mills, held a meeting at his house with G.A. Madani, Haji Abdul Latif Bawani, M.H. Adamji, S. Sattar, Muhammad Sadiq, A.Z.M. Rezai Karim and Major General Umrao Khan. In that meeting he proposed to Major General Khan, then military administrator of East Pakistan, that a grand mosque be built in Dhaka. Umrao Khan agreed to help build such a mosque. The same year, a Baitul Mukarram mosque committee was established and 8.3 acres of land between new Dhaka and Old Dhaka was chosen for the site. At that time, there was a large pond at the present mosque's location. It was known as Paltan pond. The pond was filled up and on 27 January 1960, then president of Pakistan Ayub Khan inaugurated the work. Prayers took place for the first time on Friday, 25 January 1963. On 28 March 1975, the Government of Bangladesh entrusted the management of the mosque to the Islamic Foundation Bangladesh.

The mosque complex includes shops, offices, libraries and parking areas. Unusually, the mosque does not have a dome. In 2008, the mosque was extended, financed by a donation from the government of Saudi Arabia.

== Architecture ==
The mosque has several modern architectural features whilst preserving the traditional principles of Mughal architecture which has for some time been dominant in the Indian sub-continent. Baitul Mukarram's large cube shape was modeled after that of the Kaaba at Mecca, making it a noticeable structure unlike any other mosque in Bangladesh.

=== Exterior design ===
The mosque is on a very high platform. The Baitul Mukarram National Mosque's building is eight storied and 99 feet high from the ground level. According to the original plan, the main entrance of the mosque was to be on the eastern side. The 'shaan' on the east is 29,000 square feet with ablution (Wu'du) space on its south and north sides. The absence of a dome on the main building is compensated by the two superficial domed entrance porticoes, one on the south, and the other on the north. The height of these porticoes consists of three rabbit's foot shaped arches, the middle of which is bigger than the rest.

=== Interior design ===
Two patios (roofless inner courtyard) ensure that enough light and air enter the prayer hall of Baitul Mukarram National Mosque. The prayer niché of the hall is rectangular instead of semi-circular. Excessive ornamentation is avoided throughout the mosque, since minimizing ornamentation is typical of modern architecture.

=== Garden ===
The garden is laid out in a style borrowed heavily from Mughal gardens, however unlike the traditional Mughal gardens which represent the Islamic Heaven, the garden does not have the Char-Bagh system, most likely due to not having enough room for such a garden. The future of this garden is unknown; if the Bangladeshi government extends the mosque, it will most likely have to remove the garden.

== Khatibs ==
Khatibs of Baitul Mukarram National Mosque
Serial	Name	Term	Notes
1	Abdur Rahman Bekhud (1904–1987)	1963–1971	
2	Usman Madani	1971	Acting khatib during Bangladesh Liberation War
3	Amimul Ehsan Barkati (1911–1974)	1971–1974	
4	Abdul Muiz (1919–1984)	1974–1984	
5	Ubaidul Haq (1928–2007)	1984–2007	Longest-serving khatib
6	Muhammad Nuruddin (1954–2009)	2007–2009	Acting
7	Mohammed Salahuddin (1944–2022)	2009–2022	
8	Ruhul Amin Faridpuri	2022–2024	Expelled
9	Muhammad Abdul Malek	2024–	

== Imams ==
- Mufti Muhammad Mizanur Rahman Qasemi - Senior Pesh Imam
- Mawlana Muhibbullahil Baqi an Nadavi
- Mufti Muhiuddin Qasem

== Gallery ==
Baitul Mukarram
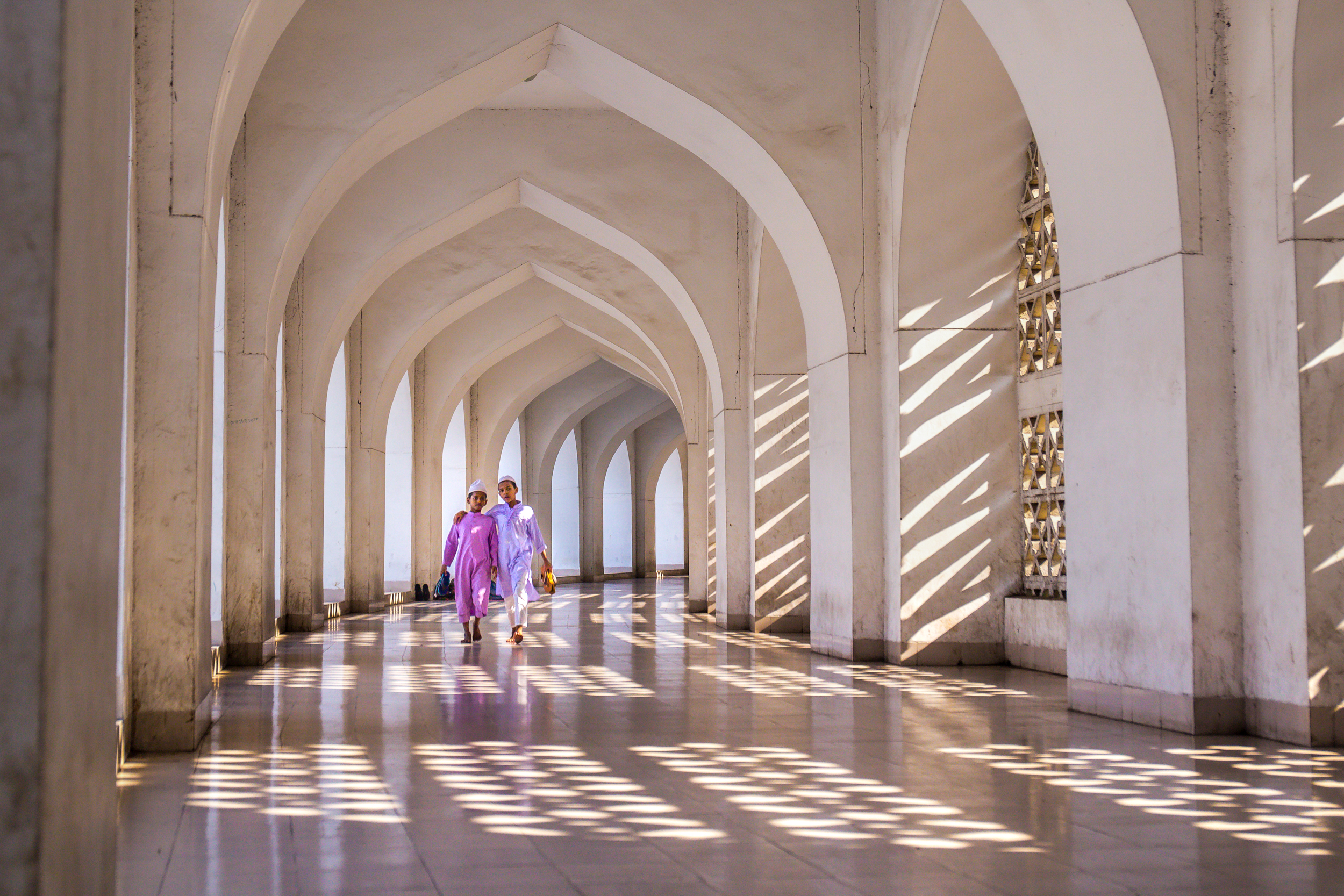
Inside view

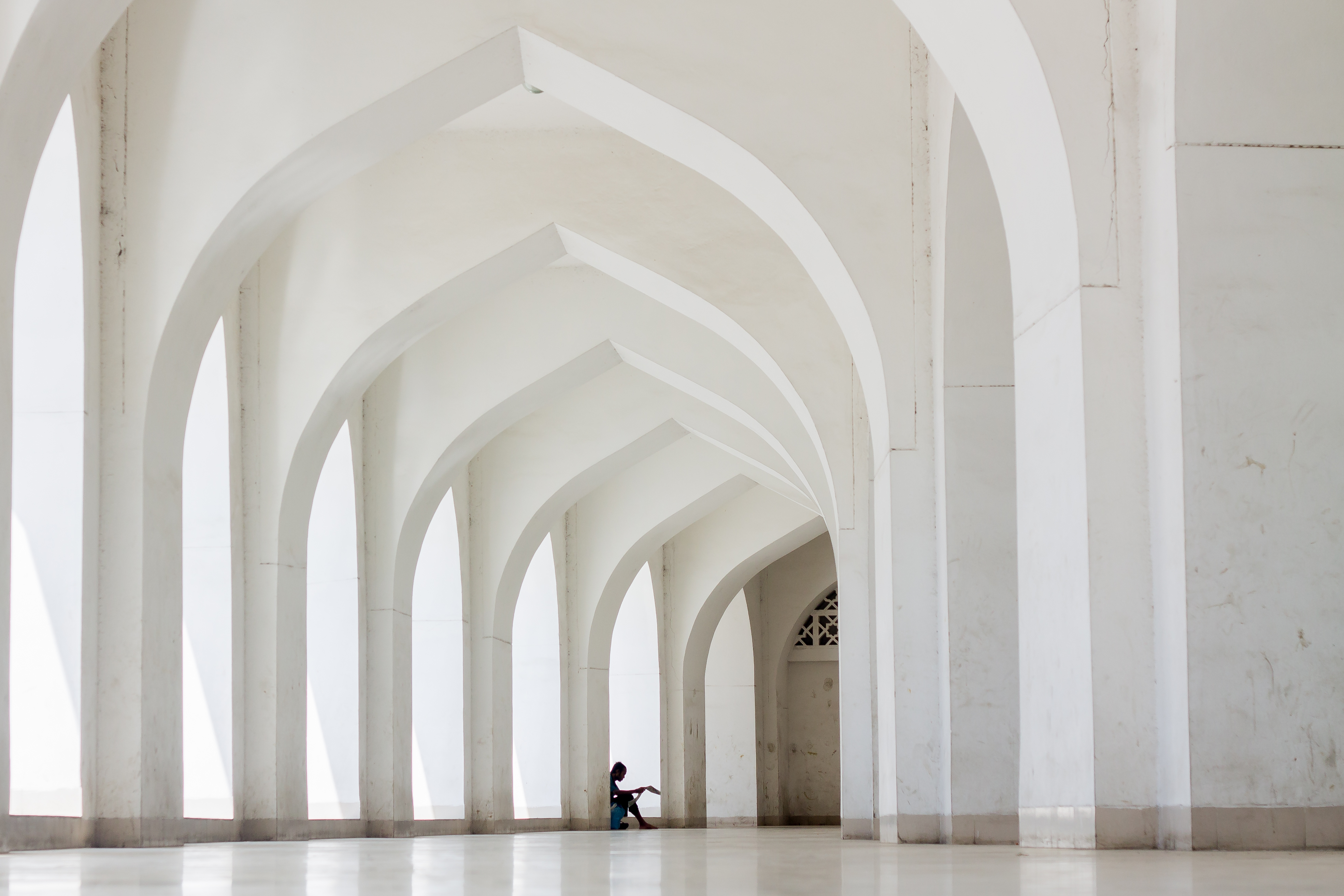
Corridor

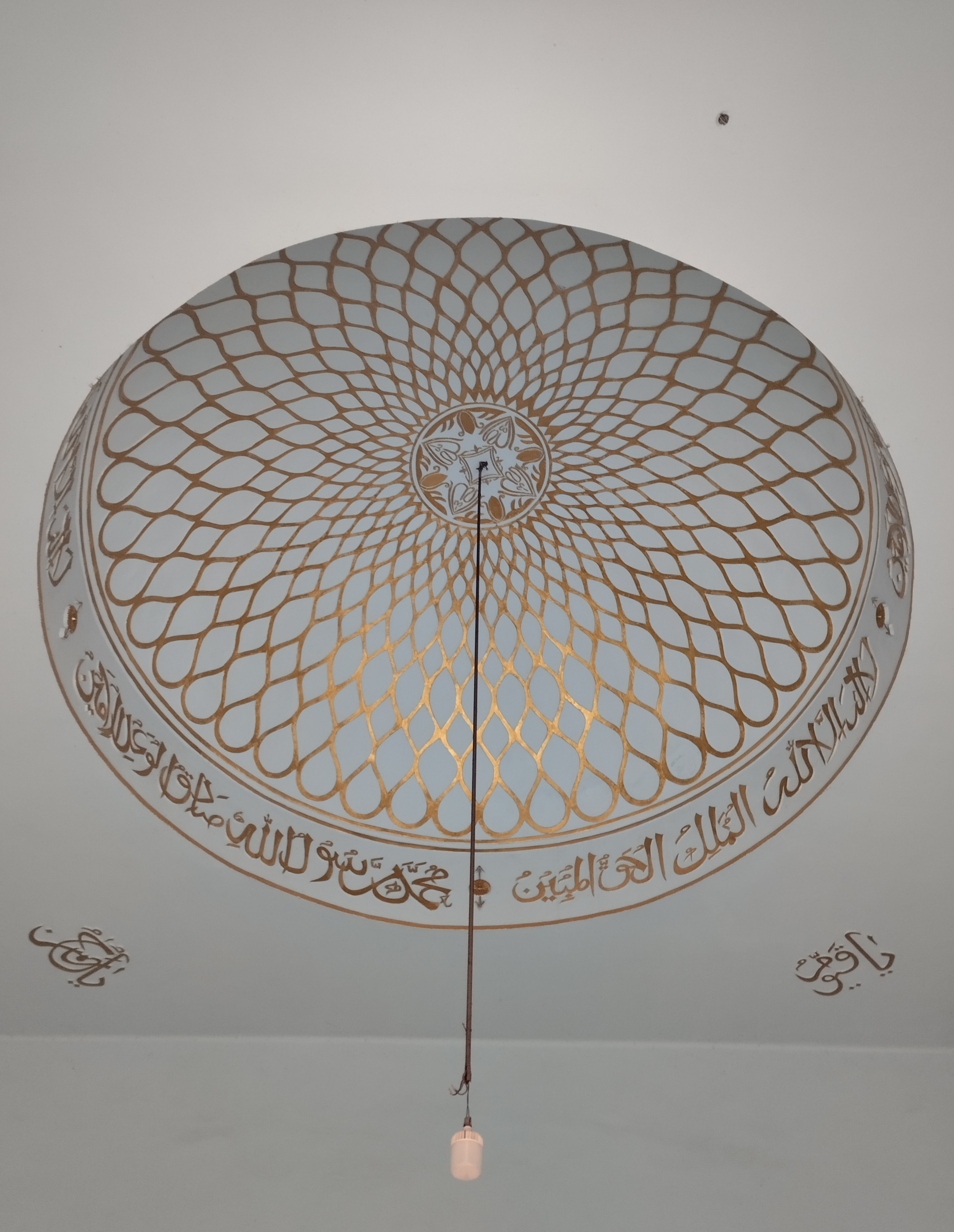
Design of inner arch

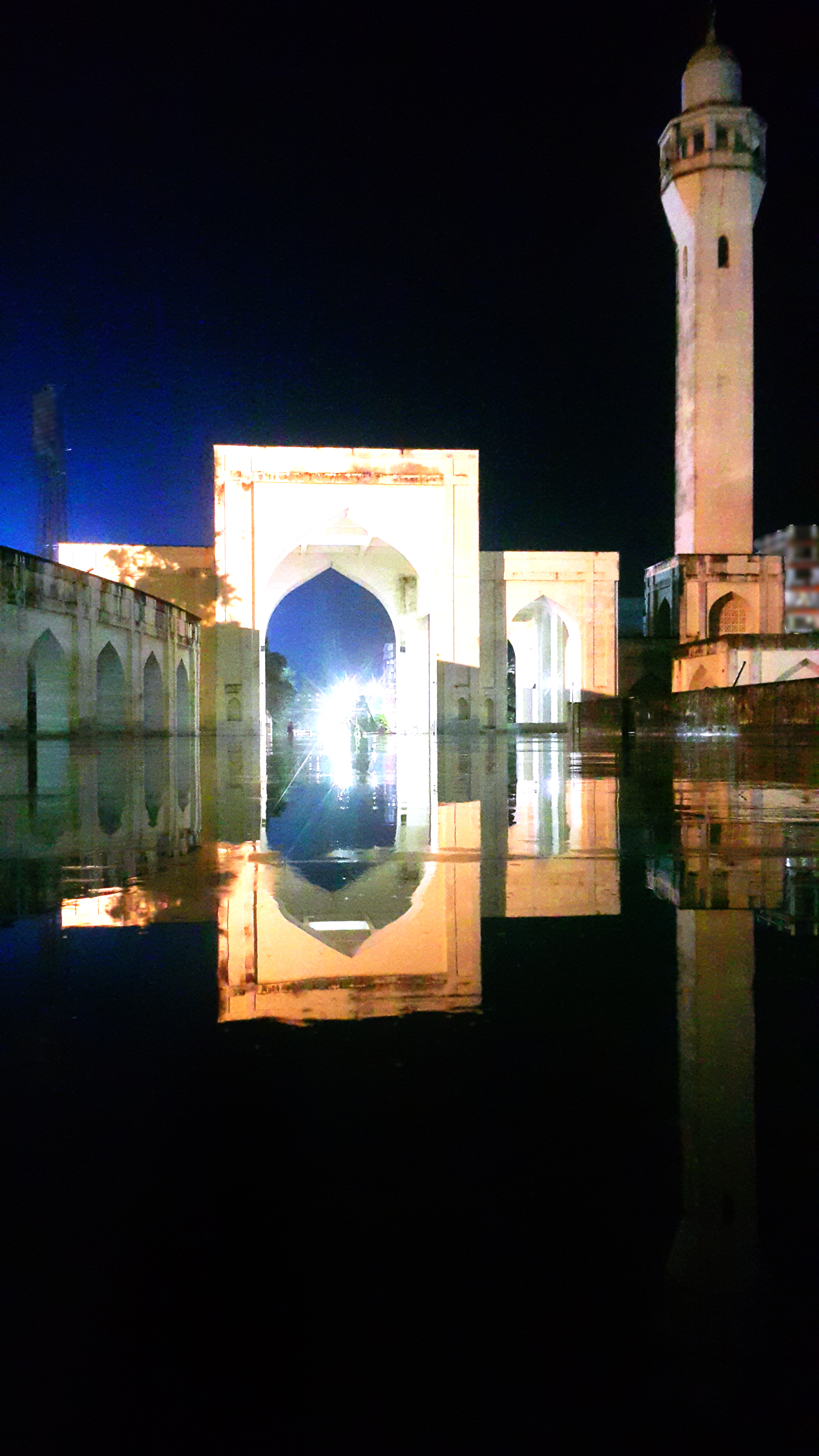
Main entrance and Minaret

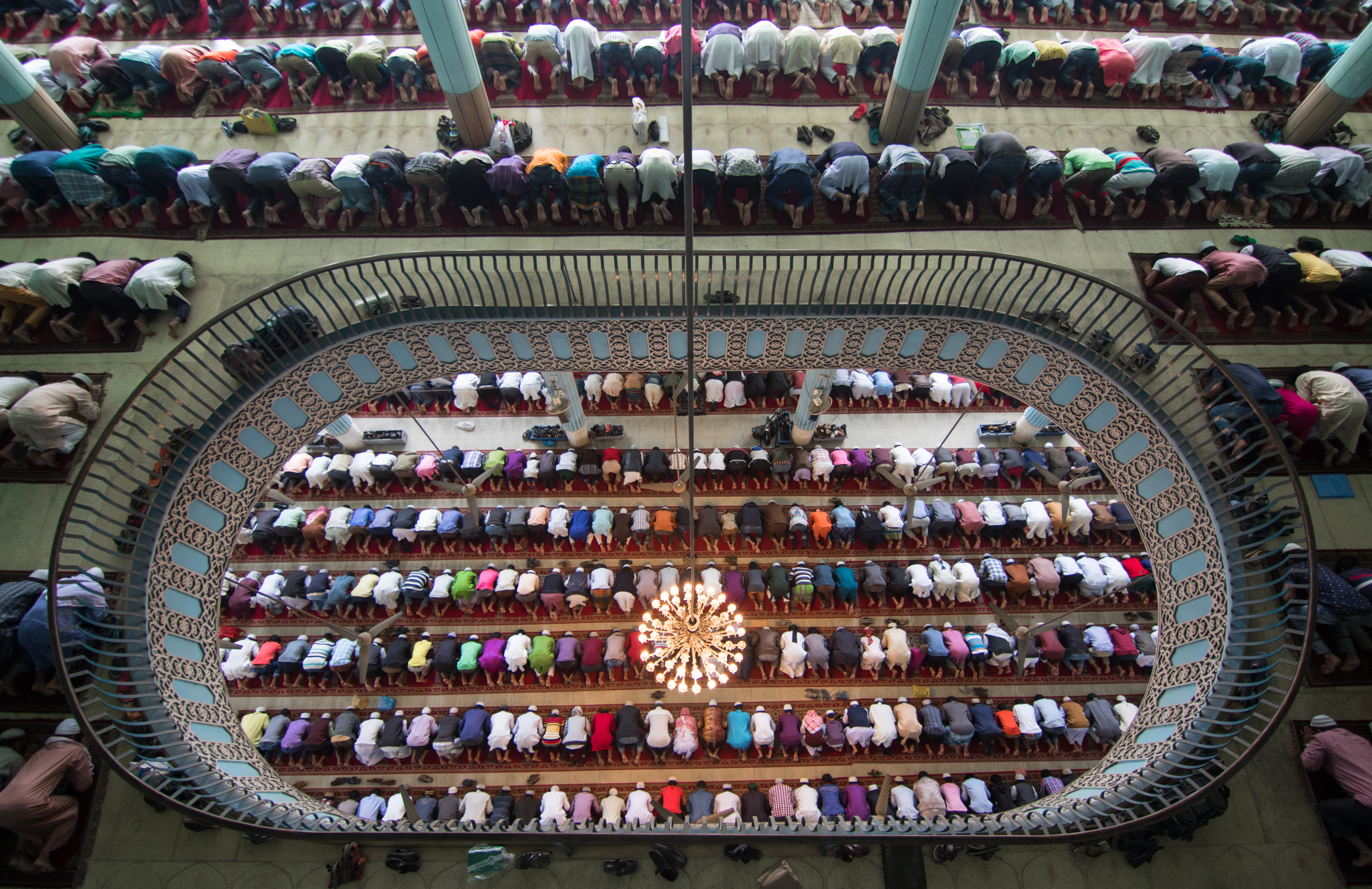
Inside view of the Mosque

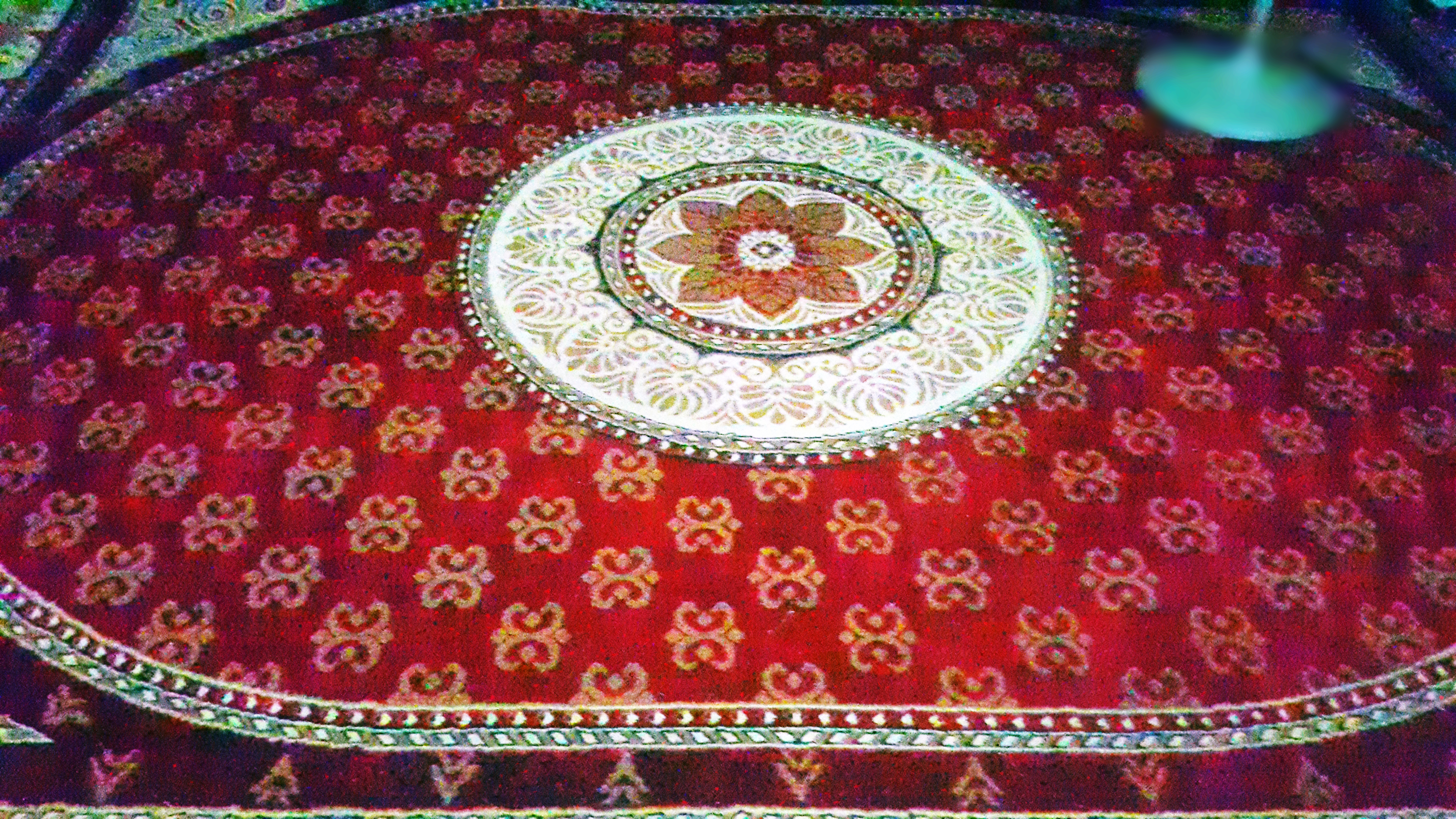
Prayer place for the imam (to the left of the minbar)

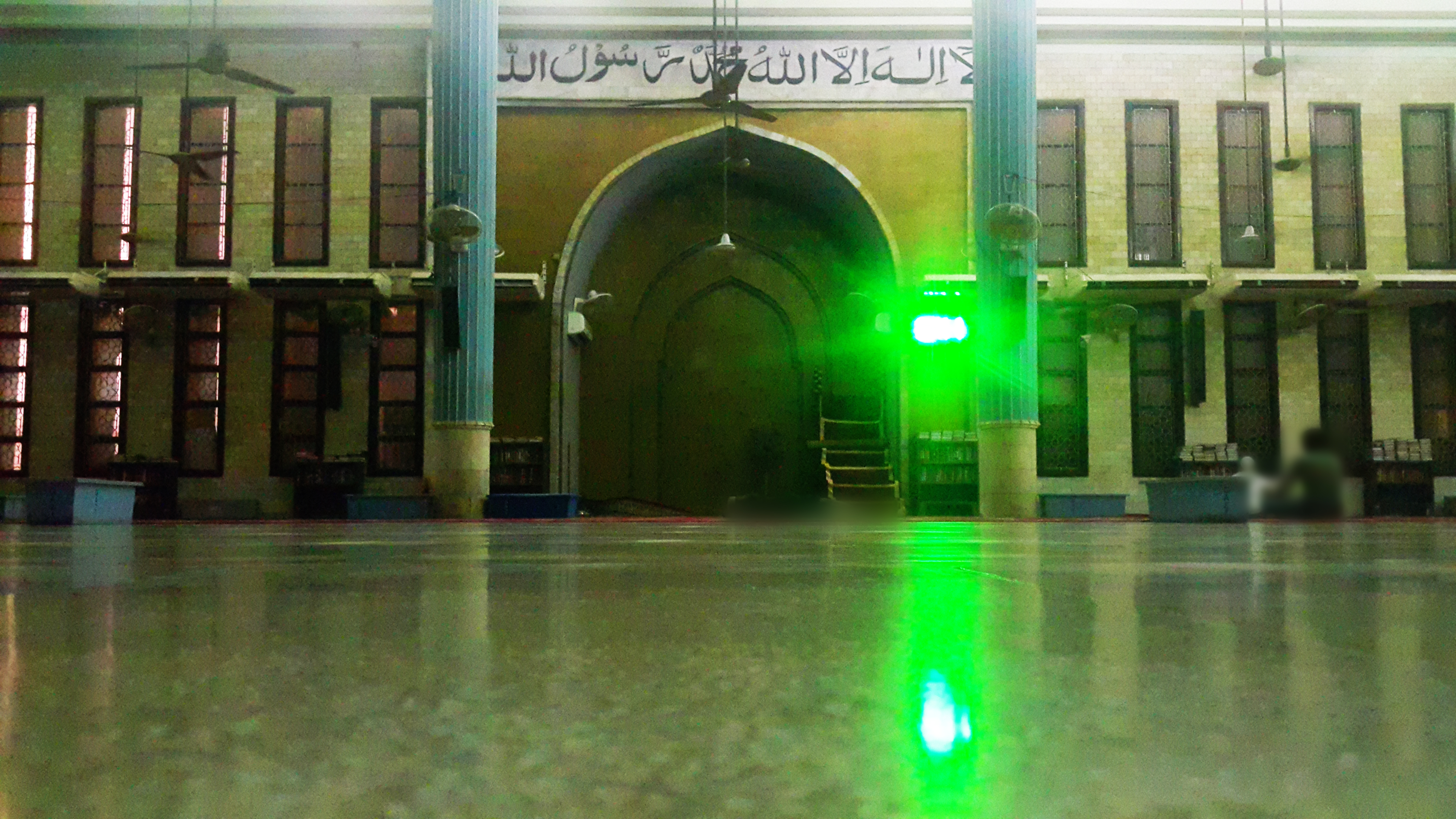
Interior (lower angle)

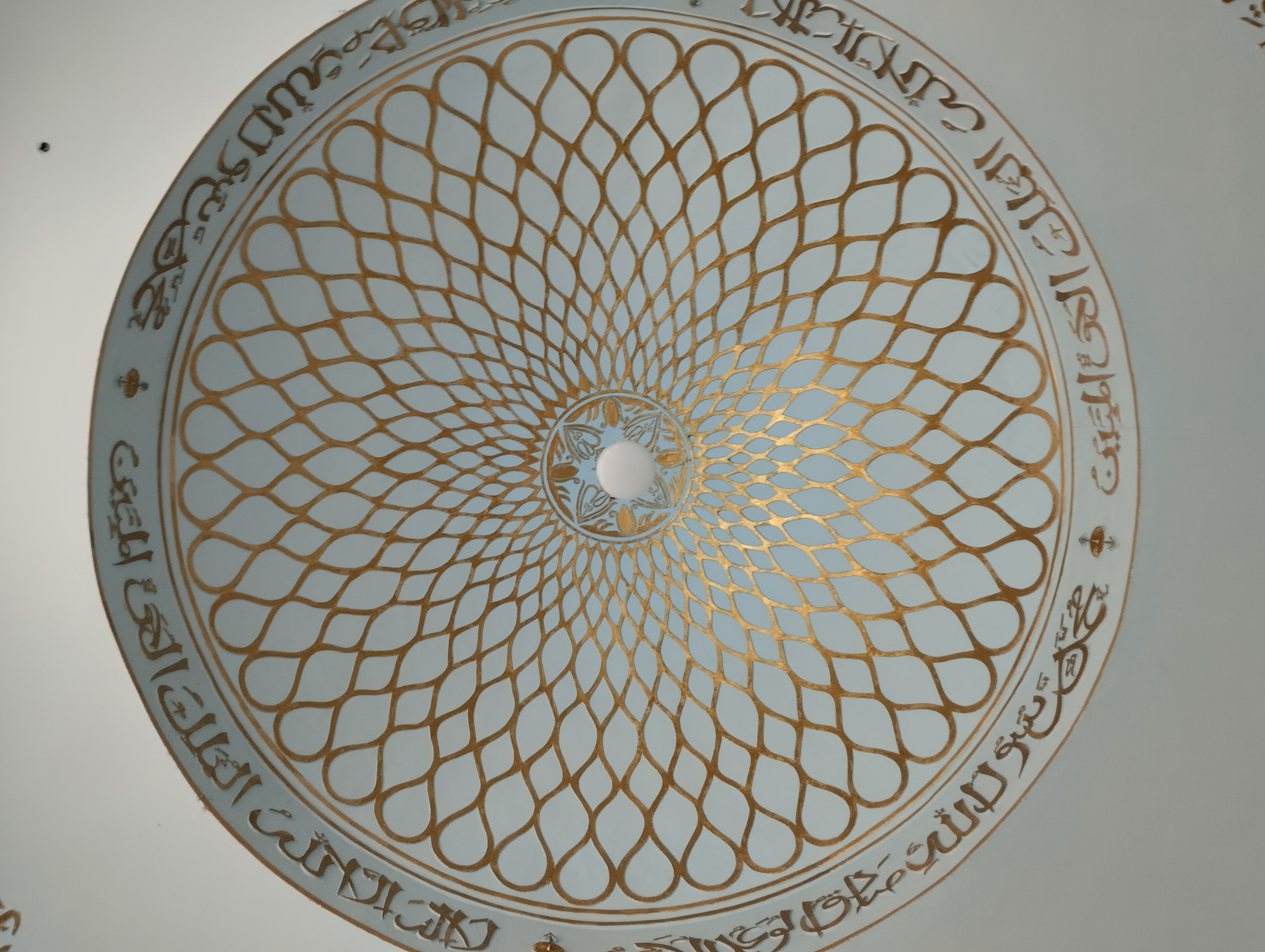
Architecture of Baitul Mukarram National Mosque

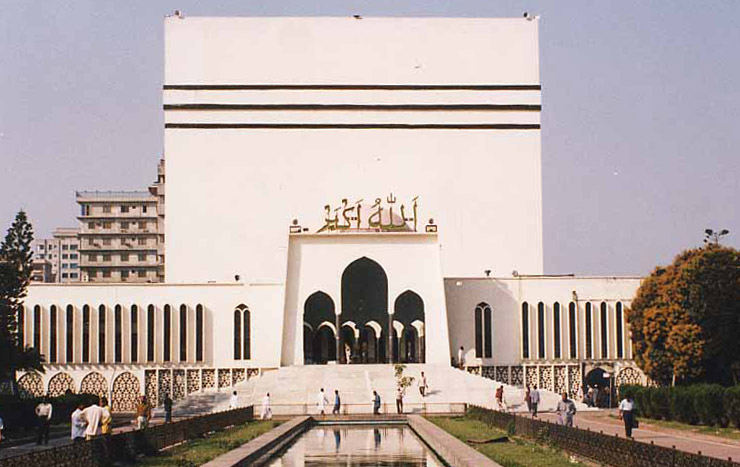
Baitul Mukarram in 2004

== See also ==
- Islam in Bangladesh
- List of mosques in Bangladesh
- Architecture of Bangladesh
- Haqqani Anjuman
- Bengali Muslims
- List of Qawmi Madrasas in Bangladesh
