= Institute of Architects, Pakistan =

Organization of Pakistan

Institute of Architects, Pakistan is the professional development body of architects in Pakistan. The Pakistan Council of Architects and Planners (PCATP) is the governing body of the institute under 1983 Act, passed by the Parliament.

== History ==
It was formed in 1957 by a small group of architects.

=== Incorporation ===
It was incorporated on 22 May 1969 in Karachi under the Companies Act VII of 1913. It was formed as a limited company.

== Presidents ==
- 2010–11: Shahab Ghani Khan
- 2011: Jehangir Khan Sherpao

== Awards for Architecture ==
Institute of Architects, Pakistan, in collaboration with Aga Khan Award for Architecture hold webinar series every year to eventually decide the winning candidates for the awards.

IAP instituted a Kausar Bashir Ahmad Academic Award for 'Socially Responsive Architectural Design'. These awards are given yearly to the deserving graduates of all accredited Schools of Architecture in Pakistan.

IAP also gives "Awards for Excellence in Architectural Design" each year for commendable architectural projects.

== Organisation ==
The Institute is governed by a National Council headed by a president. It also has four chapters, Islamabad, Karachi, Lahore and Peshawar each of which is headed by a chairperson.

=== 2024 Key achievements ===
Institute of Architects, Pakistan, in 2024, announced the successful conclusion of the 2024 Commonwealth Association of Architects (CAA) Symposium and General Assembly at Kigali, Rwanda:

Pakistan's noted architect and this institute's member Yasmeen Lari received The Lifetime Achievement Award (Robert Mathew Award) for her lifetime contributions in the field of architecture.
