= Mohammad Abdul Ahed =

Mohammad Abdul Ahed (11th July 1919 – 1st November 2001) was an architect and painter from Pakistan. He is primarily known for designing the State Bank of Pakistan building in Islamabad and the General Post Office, Karachi.

== Books ==
In February 2010 Sheba Akhtar published an illustrated monograph on Ahed's architectural and artistic work: Of Colour & Form.

== Works ==
- General Post Office, Karachi
- State Bank of Pakistan building, Islamabad

== Awards ==
- Sitara-i-Khidmat (1971).
