= Shahidul Islam (politician, born 1960) =

Bangladeshi politician (1960–2023)

Mufti Shahidul Islam
- শহিদুল ইসলাম
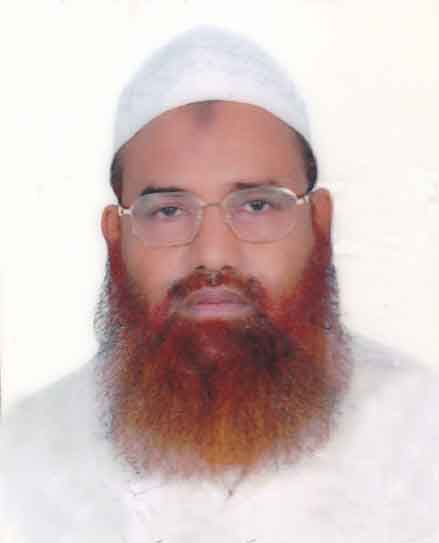

Personal life
- Born: 15 March 1960 Jhiltuli, Faridpur, East Pakistan
- Died: 27 January 2023 (aged 62) Manikganj, Bangladesh
- Children: 2 sons, 3 daughters
- Education: Jamia Uloom-ul-Islamia

Religious life
- Religion: Islam

Member of the Bangladesh Parliament for Narail-2
- In office 2002–2006
- Preceded by: Sharif Khasruzzaman
- Succeeded by: SK Abu Bakr

Personal details
- Party: Islami Oikya Jote; Bangladesh Khelafat Majlis

Shahidul Islam (Bengali: শহিদুল ইসলাম; 15 March 1960 – 27 January 2023), was a Bangladeshi Islamic scholar and politician. He was a member of parliament for the Narail-2 constituency, after winning a by-election in 2002.

== Early life and education ==
Shahidul Islam was born on 15 March 1960 to a Bengali Muslim family in Jhiltuli, Faridpur, East Pakistan. His father, Shamsul Haque Sardar, hailed from Lohagara in Narail (formerly under Jessore District). In 1988, he received his master's degree in hadith studies from Jamia Uloom-ul-Islamia in Karachi, Pakistan. He then undertook a degree in Islamic jurisprudence and received the title of mufti.

== Career ==
In 1988, he founded Al-Markazul Islami and served as its founding president. He was a member of the Majlis-ash-Shura of the Islami Oikya Jote, and served the senior depurt-Amir of the Bangladesh Khelafat Majlis.

Islam contested in the Narail-2 constituency during the 2001 8th parliamentary election, but lost his seat to Sheikh Hasina by 4,233 votes. Sheikh Hasina, who is the leader of the Awami League, won numerous seats in the country and gave up the Narail-2 seat. A by-election was held in 2002, in which Shahidul Islam was successfully elected.

== Death ==
Islam died on 27 January 2023 in Manikganj District, Bangladesh. A speech was delivered by Salman F Rahman before the funeral prayer. His janazah was performed at the Baitul Mukarram National Mosque by Ali Omar Yaqub al-Abbasi, a head imam and khatib of Al-Aqsa Mosque in Jerusalem. It was attended by the likes of Ruhul Amin Faridpuri, Muhammad Asadullah Al-Ghalib.

He was buried in the courtyard of the Jamiatul Uloom al-Islamia madrasa which he had founded in Kolatia, Keraniganj.
