= Sheikh Hafizur Rahman =

Bangladeshi politician

Member of Parliament (Bangladesh)
- In office 9 January 2014 – 2 January 2019
- Preceded by: SK Abu Bakr
- Succeeded by: Mashrafe Mortaza
- Constituency: Narail-2

Personal details
- Born: 31 March 1952 (age 73)
- Party: Bangladesh Awami League
- Spouse: Sheikh Anne Rahman
- Parent: Sheikh Habibur Rahman (father)
- Relatives: Sheikh-Wazed family

Sheikh Hafizur Rahman (born 31 March 1952) is a Bangladeshi politician. He is a member of the Trustee Board of the Bangabandhu Memorial Trust. His wife, Sheikh Anne Rahman, was a member of parliament from a reserved seat for women.
