= Bangladeshi cricket team in Australia in 2008 =

	Bangladesh	Australia
- Dates: 30 August 2008 – 6 September 2008
Captains	Mohammad Ashraful	Michael Clarke

One Day International series
- Results: Australia won the 3-match series 3–0
Most runs	Tamim Iqbal (84)	Shaun Marsh (175)
Most wickets	Shakib Al Hasan (4)	Mitchell Johnson (6)
- Player of the series: Michael Hussey (Aus)

The Bangladesh national cricket team played three One Day International (ODI) matches in Australia in 2008, under the captaincy of Mohammad Ashraful. The Australians, captained by Michael Clarke, comfortably swept the series 3–0.

The series was during the southern Australian winter, therefore the matches were played in northern Australia at Marrara Oval, Darwin. On slow, low, continental-like pitches, Bangladesh failed to score more than 125 in the series. Australian Shaun Marsh was the leading run-scorer for the series, with 175 runs. Australia's Mitchell Johnson finished leading wicket-taker for the series—with six wickets—ahead of teammates Cameron White and Stuart Clark. Michael Hussey was named man of the series as the Australians dominated every facet of the series.

== ODI series ==
=== 1st ODI ===
30 August
(scorecard)

Australia; 254/8 (50 overs)	v	Bangladesh; 74 (27.4 overs)
Michael Hussey 85 (87); Shahadat Hossain 3/42 (6 overs)		Tamim Iqbal 21 (31); Cameron White 3/5 (1.4 overs)

Australia won by 180 runs
Marrara Oval, Darwin, Australia
Umpires: Amiesh Saheba (IND) & Peter Parker (AUS)
Player of the match: Michael Hussey

- Bangladesh score of 74 runs was their lowest ODI score ever. Brett Geeves, Australian fast-medium bowler, debuted in this match taking 2/11.

=== 2nd ODI ===
3 September
(scorecard)

Bangladesh; 117 (36.1 overs)	v	Australia; 118/2 (22.4 overs)
Dhiman Ghosh 30 (36); Mitchell Johnson 3/17 (6.1 overs)		Shaun Marsh 69 (81); Shakib Al Hasan 2/38 (6.4 overs)

Australia won by 8 wickets
Marrara Oval, Darwin, Australia
Umpires: Amiesh Saheba (Ind) & Bruce Oxenford
Player of the match: Shaun Marsh

=== 3rd ODI ===
6 September
(scorecard)

Australia; 198/5 (50 overs)	v	Bangladesh; 125 (29.5 overs)
Michael Hussey 57* (72); Abdur Razzak 1/22 (10 overs)		Tamim Iqbal 63 (69); James Hopes 3/30 (5 overs)

Australia won by 73 runs
Marrara Oval, Darwin, Australia
Umpires: Amiesh Saheba (Ind) & Peter Parker
Player of the match: Tamim Iqbal

- Player of the series Michael Hussey

== Tour Matches ==
=== Australian Institute of Sport v Bangladeshis ===
18 August
(scorecard)

Australian Institute of Sport; 330/4 (50 overs)	v	Bangladeshis; 316 (49.3 overs)
Peter Forrest 83 (86); Shakib Al Hasan 1/45 (10 overs)		Tamim Iqbal 85 (45); Jon Holland 4/43 (10 overs)

Australian Institute of Sport won by 14 runs.
Gardens Oval, Darwin, Australia
Umpires: Stuart Rudd & R Saunders

=== Australian Institute of Sport v Bangladeshis ===
20 August
(scorecard)

Australian Institute of Sport; 284/8 (50 overs)	v	Bangladeshis; 288/7 (44.5 overs)
Michael Hill 59 (52); Shahadat Hossain 3/64 (9 overs)		Mashrafe Mortaza 56 (44); Steve Smith 3/56 (9 overs)

Bangladeshis won by 3 wickets
Gardens Oval, Darwin, Australia
Umpires: Mark Donfeld & R Saunders

=== Australian Institute of Sport v Bangladeshis ===
23 August
(scorecard)

Bangladeshis (Bangladesh); 270/9 (50 overs)	v	Australian Institute of Sport; 271/5 (48.1 overs)
Shakib Al Hasan 67 (55); Grant Sullivan 2/39 (10 overs)		Usman Khawaja 94 (123); Shakib Al Hasan 2/34 (8 overs)

Australian Institute of Sport won by 5 wickets
Gardens Oval, Darwin, Australia
Umpires: Bruce Oxenford & Peter Parker

- Players per side: 12 (11 batting, 11 fielding)

=== Australian Institute of Sport v Bangladeshis ===
25 August
(scorecard)

Bangladeshis (Bangladesh); 229/9 (50 overs)	v	Australian Institute of Sport; 230/1 (36.2 overs)
Alok Kapali 62 (74); Grant Sullivan 4/30 (10 overs)		Usman Khawaja 101 (92); Abdur Razzak 1/32 (4 overs)

Australian Institute of Sport won by 9 wickets
Gardens Oval, Darwin, Australia
Umpires: Bruce Oxenford & Rod Tucker

- Players per side 12 (11 batting, 11 fielding)

=== Northern Territory Chief Minister's XI v Bangladeshis ===
27 August
(scorecard)

Bangladeshis (Bangladesh); 305/4 (50 overs)	v	Northern Territory Chief Minister's XI; 185 (38.2 overs)
Mehrab Hossain jnr 132* (129); Richmond Hodgson 2/66 (10 overs)		Shane McDermott 61 (48); Alok Kapali 3/22 (6.2 overs)

Bangladeshis won by 120 runs.
Gardens Oval, Darwin, Australia
Umpires: Peter Parker & Stuart Rudd

- Players per side: Bangladeshis 11; Northern Territory Chief Minister's XI 13 (11 batting, 11 fielding)
