= Narail-2 =

Constituency of Bangladesh's Jatiya Sangsad

Coordinates: 23.18°N 89.65°E

- Constituency for the Jatiya Sangsad
- District: Narail District
- Division: Khulna Division
- Electorate: 317,844 (2018)

Current constituency
- Created: 1984
- Parliamentary Party: Bangladesh Jamaat-e-Islami
- Member of Parliament: Ataur Rahman Bachchu
- ← 93 Narail-1 95 Bagerhat-1 →

Narail-2 is a constituency represented in the Jatiya Sangsad (National Parliament) of Bangladesh.

== Boundaries ==
The constituency encompasses Lohagara Upazila and all but five union parishads of Narail Sadar Upazila: Bhadrabila, Bichhali, Kalora, Shaikhati, and Singasolpur.

== History ==
The constituency was created in 1984 from a Jessore constituency when the former Jessore District was split into four districts: Jhenaidah, Jessore, Magura, and Narail.

== Members of Parliament ==
Election	Member	Party
1986	Saif Hafizur Rahman	Jatiya Party
1991	Sharif Khasruzzaman	Awami League
Feb 1996	Abdul Quader Sikder	Independent
Jun 1996	Sharif Khasruzzaman	Awami League
Jan 2002 by-election	Shahidul Islam	BNP
2008	SK Abu Bakr	Awami League
2014	Hafizur Rahman	Workers Party
2018	Mashrafe Bin Mortaza	Awami League
2024	Mashrafe Bin Mortaza	Awami League
2026	Ataur Rahman Bachchu	Jamaat-e-Islami

== Elections ==
General Election 2026: Narail-2
Party	Candidate	Votes	%	±%
Jamaat	Ataur Rahman Bachchu	118,142	37.1	N/A
Independent	Md. Monirul Islam	78,457	24.6	N/A
BNP	AZM Fariduzzaman Farhad	45,463	14.3	N/A
Majority		39,685	12.48	
Turnout		317844	76.1	

=== Elections in the 2010s ===
General Election 2018: Narail-2
Party	Candidate	Votes	%	±%
AL	Mashrafe Mortaza	271,210	96.06	N/A
BNP	AZM Fariduzzaman Farhad	7,883	2.79	N/A
IAB	SM Nassir Uddin	3,125	1.11	N/A
JP(E)	Khandker Fayek Uzzaman	121	0.04	N/A
Majority		263,327	93.27	
Turnout		282,339	88.83	
Registered electors		317,844		
AL gain from WPB				

General Election 2014: Narail-2
Party	Candidate	Votes	%	±%
WPB	Hafizur Rahman	95,117	81.0	N/A
Independent	Sohrab Hossain Biswas	22,320	19.0	N/A
Majority		72,797	62.0	+35.4
Turnout		117,437	43.1	−44.3
WPB gain from AL				

=== Elections in the 2000s ===
General Election 2008: Narail-2
Party	Candidate	Votes	%	±%
AL	SK Abu Bakr	125,458	59.8	+58.0
BNP	Sharif Khasruzzaman	69,657	33.2	−63.4
National People's Party	AZM Fariduzzaman Farhad	292	0.1	N/A
Bangladesh Khelafat Majlish	Imarnuzzaman	11,253	5.4	N/A
IAB	S. M. Nasir Uddin	2,408	1.1	N/A
LDP	Delip Kumar Adhikari	575	0.3	N/A
Majority		55,801	26.6	−68.4
Turnout		209,643	87.4	+29.5
AL gain from BNP				

Sheikh Hasina stood for five seats in the October 2001 general election: Rangpur-6, Narail-1, Narail-2, Barguna-3, and Gopalganj-3. After winning all but Rangpur-6, she chose to represent Gopalganj-3 and quit the other three, triggering by-elections in them. Shahidul Islam of the BNP was elected in a January 2002 by-election.

Narail-2 by-election, January 2002
Party	Candidate	Votes	%	±%
BNP	Shahidul Islam	137,695	96.6	+48.4
AL	Sohrab Hossain Biswas	2,508	1.8	−48.5
Jatiya Janata Party (Asad)	Sheikh Md. Asaduzzaman	1,162	0.8	+0.7
JP(E)	Sharif Munir Hossain	473	0.3	N/A
Jatiya Party (M)	Sathi Talukdar	363	0.3	+0.2
Independent	Mahabubul Alam Tuku	321	0.2	N/A
Majority		135,187	94.9	+92.8
Turnout		142,522	57.9	−20.1
BNP gain from AL				

General Election 2001: Narail-2
Party	Candidate	Votes	%	±%
AL	Sheikh Hasina	97,195	50.3	+5.4
BNP	Shahidul Islam	93,081	48.2	+18.2
IJOF	Md. Tozammel Sheikh	1,337	0.7	N/A
WPB	Hafizur Rahman	1,186	0.6	−1.2
Jatiya Janata Party (Asad)	Sheikh Md. Asaduzzaman	148	0.1	−0.1
Independent	Ashok Kundu	74	0.0	N/A
Ganatantri Party	Shamuel Subash Bose	52	0.0	N/A
Jatiya Party (M)	Md. Emdadul Haq Nanu	50	0.0	N/A
Majority		4,114	2.1	−12.8
Turnout		193,123	78.0	−0.2
AL hold				

=== Elections in the 1990s ===
General Election June 1996: Narail-2
Party	Candidate	Votes	%	±%
AL	Sharif Khasruzzaman	63,913	44.9	−0.1
BNP	A. Kader Sikdar	42,718	30.0	+5.4
Jamaat	Nuru Nabi Jihadi	22,093	15.5	−8.1
JP(E)	Saif Hafizur Rahman	7,474	5.3	+5.0
WPB	Bimal Biswas	2,519	1.8	N/A
IOJ	Md. Abdur Rahman Mollah	2,432	1.7	N/A
Independent	S. M. Sarwar Hossain	566	0.4	N/A
Zaker Party	Shubhashish Bagchi	241	0.2	−0.1
Jatiya Janata Party (Asad)	Sheikh Md. Asaduzzaman	238	0.2	−0.1
Majority		21,195	14.9	−5.5
Turnout		142,194	78.2	+18.2
AL hold				

General Election 1991: Narail-2
Party	Candidate	Votes	%	±%
AL	Sharif Khashruzzaman	59,506	45.0	
BNP	Mokbul Hossain	32,516	24.6	
Jamaat	Nurun Nabi Mollah	31,174	23.6	
UCL	Bimal Biswas	7,222	5.5	
JP(E)	Saif Hafizur Rahman	457	0.3	
Zaker Party	Mominuddin Munshi	439	0.3	
Jatiya Janata Party (Asad)	Sheikh Md. Asaduzzaman	410	0.3	
FP	Md. Asasduzzaman	276	0.2	
Bangladesh Muslim League (Kader)	Motaleb Shikder	120	0.1	
Majority		26,990	20.4	
Turnout		132,120	60.0	
AL gain from JP(E)				
