= Mashrafe Mortaza =

Former Bangladeshi cricketer and politician

Mashrafe Bin Mortaza
- মাশরাফী বিন মোর্তজা
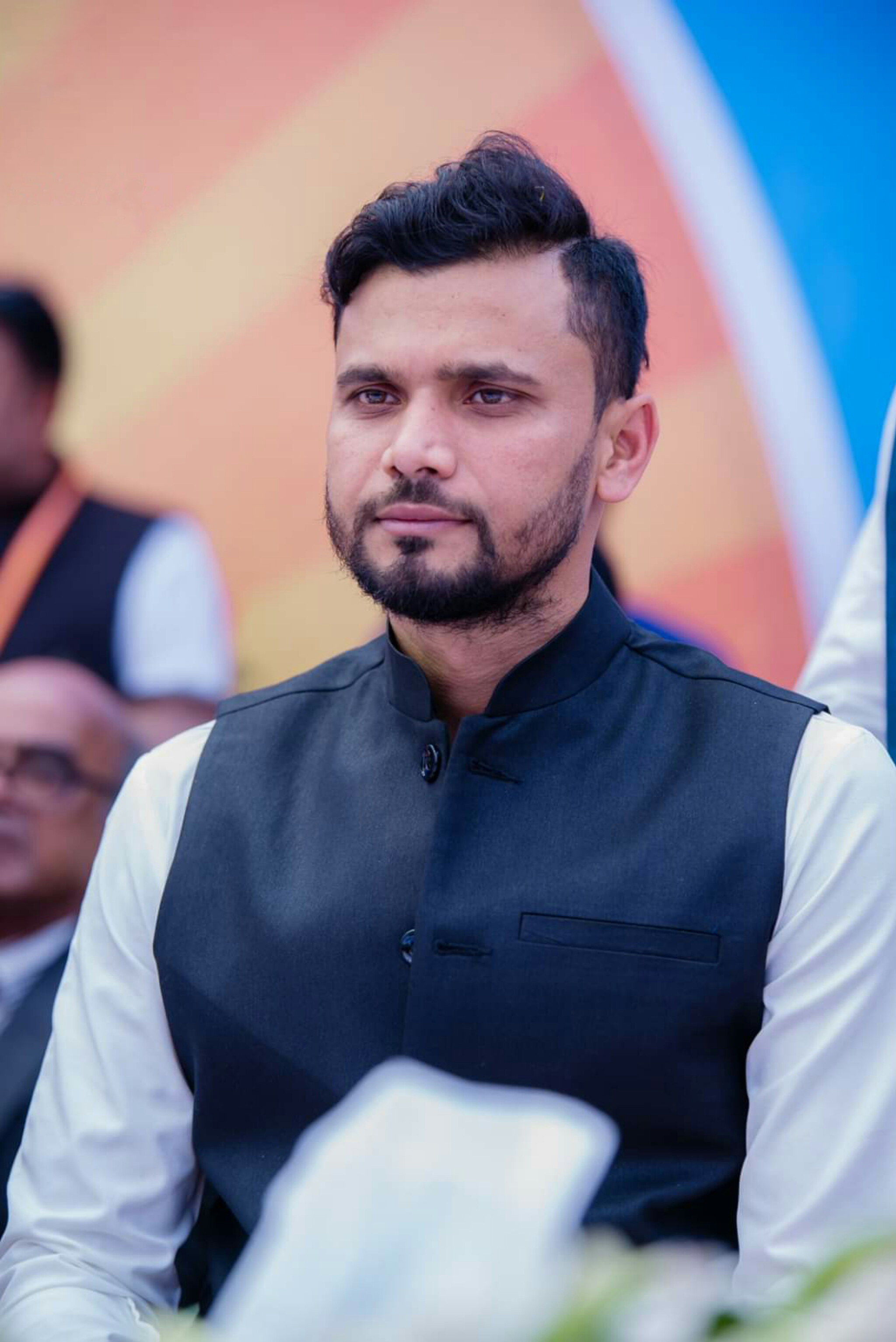
- Mortaza at a rally (2019)

Member of the Bangladesh Parliament for Narail-2
- In office 3 January 2019 – 6 August 2024
- Preceded by: Hafizur Rahman
- Succeeded by: Ataur Rahman Bachchu

Personal details
- Born: 5 October 1983 (age 43) Narail, Khulna, Bangladesh
- Party: Bangladesh Awami League
- Spouse: Sumona Haque Sumi
- Children: 2
- Education: Bachelor of Arts in Philosophy
- Alma mater: Jahangirnagar University
- Occupation: Politician, cricketer
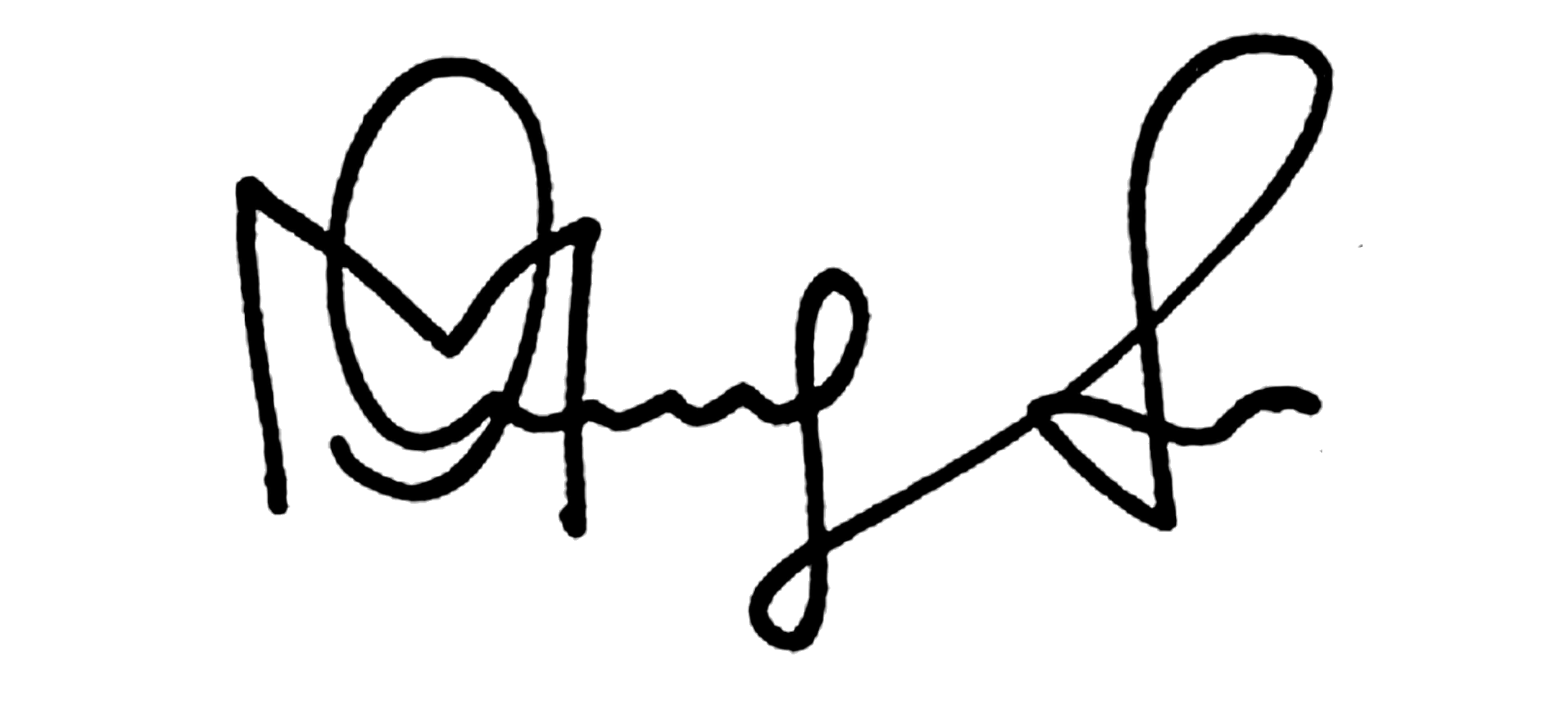
- Signature
- Cricket career

Personal information
- Nickname: Mash, Koushik, Narail Express
- Height: 1.83 m (6 ft 0 in)
- Batting: Right-handed
- Bowling: Right arm Fast
- Role: Bowler

International information
- National side: Bangladesh (2001–2020)
- Test debut (cap 19): 8 November 2001 v Zimbabwe
- Last Test: 9 July 2009 v West Indies
- ODI debut (cap 54): 23 November 2001 v Zimbabwe
- Last ODI: 6 March 2020 v Zimbabwe
- ODI shirt no.: 2
- T20I debut (cap 4): 28 November 2006 v Zimbabwe
- Last T20I: 6 April 2017 v Sri Lanka
- T20I shirt no.: 2

Domestic team information
- Years: Team
- 2002–present: Khulna Division
- 2009-2010: Kolkata Knight Riders
- 2012–2013: Dhaka Gladiators
- 2015–2016: Comilla Victorians
- 2017: Rangpur Riders
- 2019–2020: Dhaka Platoon
- 2020: Gemcon Khulna
- 2022: Minister Group Dhaka
- 2023–2024: Sylhet Strikers

Career statistics
Competition	Test	ODI	FC	LA
Matches	36	220	57	335
Runs scored	797	1787	1458	3309
Batting average	12.85	13.74	15.67	15.75
100s/50s	0/3	0/1	1/6	1/8
Top score	79	51*	132*	104
Balls bowled	5990	10922	8970	16427
Wickets	78	270	135	459
Bowling average	41.52	32.93	35.05	29.04
5 wickets in innings	0	1	0	7
10 wickets in match	0	0	0	0
Best bowling	4/60	6/26	4/27	6/26
Catches/stumpings	9/0	62/0	24/0	102/0
Medal record
Men's Cricket
Representing Bangladesh
ACC Asia Cup
Runner-up	2012 Bangladesh
Runner-up	2016 Bangladesh
Runner-up	2018 UAE
Asian Games
Bronze medal – third place	2014 Incheon	Team
- Source: ESPNcricinfo, 7 January 2024

Mashrafe Bin Mortaza (born 5 October 1983), popularly known as the Narail Express, is a Bangladeshi politician and former cricketer who captained in all three formats of the game for the Bangladesh national cricket team. He also served as a Member of Parliament representing the Narail-2 constituency during 2019–2024. He is widely regarded as the most successful captain for the Bangladesh cricket team. (Note: Multiple references:)

He started this test debut against Zimbabwe in 2001. He impressed Andy Roberts, who was then coaching Bangladesh and was drafted into the Test team - in his debut first-class game. In 2006, Mashrafe was the world's highest wicket-taker in ODIs, collecting 49 wickets in total. He was the Man-of-the-match in the match against India in the 2007 Cricket World Cup. He took four wickets that game and knocked out India from the group stage. Mashrafe was picked up by the Kolkata Knight Riders for $600,000 in IPL 2009. Mashrafe debuted as a captain after the 2009 T20 World Cup, where he captained Bangladesh against West Indies and Zimbabwe and won both them but it led him to an ankle injury and forced him to hand over the captaincy duties to Shakib Al Hasan later. He suffered a tear in his knee ligament after that. This forced him to miss the 2011 Cricket World Cup. After overcoming his injuries, Mashrafe took his position back in the squad after 4 years and captained Bangladesh to the 2015 Cricket World Cup, where they were able to reach the quarterfinals for the first time. After getting knocked out by India at the quarterfinals in the World Cup, Mashrafe led his team back to back ODI series wins against Pakistan (3–0), India (2–1) and then world cup runners-up New Zealand (3–2) at home for the first time in their cricket history. It eventually made them a dominant ODI team in their home grounds. These results sealed a place for Bangladesh in the 2017 ICC Champions Trophy for the first time, where they finished off as semifinalists. His captaincy led Bangladesh Team to become the runners-up of the Asia Cup for two consecutive years (2016, 2018) but lost to India in both. Throughout his career, Mashrafe has played a pivotal role in Bangladesh's rise as a competitive cricketing nation.

Mashrafe won the first edition of Bangladesh Premier League as a captain in 2012 with Dhaka Gladiators. He joined Comilla Victorians in 2015 and won their first BPL title. He also won the 2017 Bangladesh Premier League for third time as captain with Rangpur Riders, making him the most successful player at the tournament as a captain.

Mashrafe was ranked as one of the most famous athletes in the world on ESPN World Fame 100 in 2019. According to Antiguan first-class cricketer Andy Roberts, Mashrafe is the most talented cricketer in Bangladesh. He became only the fifth bowler in history to take 100 ODI wickets as a captain. Mashrafe is also the first pace bowler in Bangladesh who bowled a delivery clocking over 147 km/h, which he did during a Test against New Zealand at Hamilton in 2001. Mashrafe's career has been hampered by fifteen injuries as he has undergone a total of ten operations on his knees and ankles. On 6 March 2020, Mashrafe, at the age of 37, announced his retirement from national team captaincy by playing the last match of the ODI series against Zimbabwe.

== Domestic career ==
=== Indian Premier League ===
He was bought by Kolkata Knight Riders for the 2009 Indian Premier League auction, with an estimated amount of US$ 600,000. He played just one match being not out with 2 runs and giving 58 runs of 4 overs.

=== Dhaka Premier League ===
Due to his international commitments, Mashrafe has infrequently played for Khulna Division in Bangladesh's domestic cricket competitions.

While he has represented Bangladesh 36 times in Tests and in 100 ODIs between 2001 and 2005 he played only 11 first-class and 9 list A matches for Khulna Division in the same period.

In March 2018, Mashrafe took four wickets in four balls bowling for Abahani Limited against Agrani Bank Cricket Club in the 2017–18 Dhaka Premier Division Cricket League. He took his first List A hat-trick and became the first Bangladeshi bowler to take four wickets in four balls in List A cricket. He finished the 2017–18 Dhaka Premier Division Cricket League as the leading wicket-taker of the tournament, with 39 dismissals in 16 matches.

=== Bangladesh Premier League ===
In 2012 he joined the Dhaka Gladiators and 2015 from Comilla Victorians in the newly formed Bangladesh Premier League twenty20 competition and captained them to the tournament title and led Comilla Victorians clinch the title of the third Bangladesh Premier League (BPL) as well as champion of 2017 Bangladesh Premier League fourth time as captain.In October 2018, he was named in the squad for the Rangpur Riders team, following the draft for the 2018–19 Bangladesh Premier League. He was the leading wicket-taker for the team in the tournament, with 22 dismissals in 14 matches. In November 2019, he was selected to play for the Dhaka Platoon in the 2019–20 Bangladesh Premier League. In the 9th edition of BPL which took place in 2023, he captained Sylhet Strikers and helped them reach the BPL final for the first time.

=== Bangabandu T20 Cup ===
Mashrafe was selected for play for Gemcon Khulna in Bangabandu T20 Cup 2020. In the tournament's eliminator, he took his first five-wicket haul in T20s.

== International career ==
=== Emergence ===
Mashrafe is one of the most successful pace bowlers to have emerged from Bangladesh. The pace and aggression Mashrafe displayed as an under-19 player impressed Andy Roberts, the former West Indian fast bowler, who was acting as a temporary bowling coach for Bangladesh. Under Roberts' recommendation, Mashrafe was drafted into the Bangladesh A team.

After one match for Bangladesh A (to date his only Bangladesh A match), Mashrafe made his Test debut on 8 November 2001 against Zimbabwe in the Bangabandhu National Stadium in Dhaka. Khaled Mahmud also debuted in the match, which was curtailed by rain and ended in a draw. Mashrafe opened the bowling with Mohammad Manjural Islam and took 4 wickets for 106 runs (also written as 4/106) as Zimbabwe did not bat a second time. His first, also known as "maiden", Test wicket was that of Grant Flower. Unusually the match was also Mashrafe's maiden first-class match; he was the 31st person to have achieved this, and the third since 1899. Mashrafe also made his first appearance for Bangladesh's one day team on 23 November 2001 along with fellow debutants Fahim Muntasir and Tushar Imran. Opening the bowling with Mohammad Sharif, Mashrafe finished with figures of 2/26 from 8.2 overs as Zimbabwe won the match by five wickets.

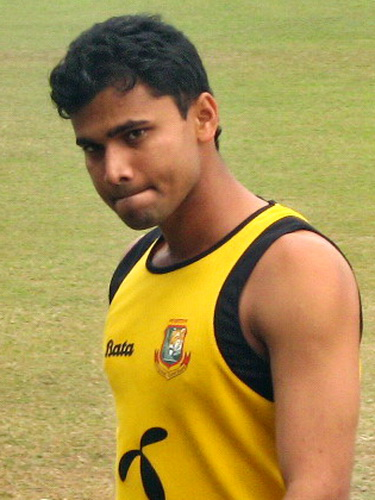
Mashrafe in a training session, 2009

He broke into the national team in late 2001 against Zimbabwe and represented Bangladesh before having played a single first-class match. Mashrafe captained his country in one Test and seven One Day Internationals (ODIs) between 2009 and 2010, however, injury meant he was in and out of the team and Shakib Al Hasan was appointed captain in Mashrafe's absence. Mashrafe used to be considered one of the fastest bowlers produced by Bangladesh, previously bowling in the mid-145s-148s km/h in the 2000s, and regularly opened the bowling.

=== Injury problems ===
After the Test series against Zimbabwe and one against New Zealand, Mashrafe missed the series against Pakistan in January 2002 as he was suffering from a back injury. While recovering, Mashrafe suffered a knee injury while skipping and required an operation. As a result, he was unable to play cricket for a further eight months. At this stage of his career, Mashrafe had played four Tests and taken 12 wickets at an average of 31.16.

Mashrafe did not return to international cricket until the 2003 World Cup in South Africa during 2003. Bangladesh failed to progress past the round-robin stage, and he played in two matches collecting two wickets at an average of 38.00.

In October and November 2003, England toured Bangladesh for two-Tests and three ODIs. In the second Test, Mashrafe took what at the time was his best Test figures of 4/60 before succumbing to injury, collapsing with a twisted knee after delivering the ball. Despite challenging England in the series, Bangladesh lost 2–0, Mashrafe finished the series with 8 wickets at an average of 21.25. As a result, he was again out of international cricket; this time for over a year. Injuries in the first three years of his international career saw Mashrafe only play 12 Tests and not more than four in a row.

=== Success ===
Mashrafe returned from his career-threatening injury and, after impressing in Bangladesh domestic cricket, he was selected in the 13-man squad to face India in a home two-Test series during December 2004. He announced his return to Test cricket in the first Test at Dhaka by dismissing Rahul Dravid. He bowled consistently in the series and nearly dismissed Sachin Tendulkar and Sourav Ganguly, but catches were dropped. ESPNcricinfo noted that in the second Test he "toiled manfully again with wretched back-up". Mashrafe finished the series with five wickets at an average of 37.00, although Bangladesh lost 2–0. In the following ODI series, Mashrafe played an instrumental role in Bangladesh's 16 run defeat of India in the second ODI on 26 December 2004. He was awarded the man of the match for his all-round performance—taking two wickets, two catches and scoring 31 not out. The match was Bangladesh's 100th ODI and Mashrafe's first one-day cricket in 15 months. Bangladesh went on to lose the series 2–1.

In January 2005 Zimbabwe toured Bangladesh, playing two Tests and five ODIs. Bangladesh won the Test series one Test to nil, their first series victory in Test cricket. In addition, Bangladesh's victory in the first Test at the MA Aziz Stadium was their first Test win. In the final innings of the first match, Mashrafe took the ninth wicket and with victory imminent he struggled to bowl the next ball and had to wipe away tears and regain his composure before starting his run-up. Despite a sore back in the second Test, Mashrafe continued to bowl. In the two Tests, Mashrafe scored 93 runs at an average of 31.00 and took nine wickets at an average of 24.88. In a close ODI series, Bangladesh won 3–2 after being 2–0 down, Mashrafe played in four matches and took four wickets at an average of 40.00.

Playing for Khulna Division against Sylhet Division in March 2005, Mashrafe scored his maiden first-class century. Batting at number four in his team's second innings, Mashrafe scored 132 not out from 140 balls; the innings far surpassing his previous best first-class score of 70, and was named man of the match.

Mashrafe enhanced his reputation on Bangladesh's inaugural tour of England, and was the team's leading bowler, although his team lost the two-match Test series 2–0. He was by far the most economical of the Bangladeshi bowlers, conceding on average nearly half a run less per over than the next best bowler. Mashrafe finished the series with four wickets at 49.50 and was the team's leading wicket taker. He consistently troubled the English batsmen, repeatedly beating the bat. A ODI tri-series followed in which Bangladesh recorded their maiden win against Australia. Mashrafe's bowling was important in Bangladesh's huge upset against Australia in Cardiff, removing Adam Gilchrist for a duck and conceding 33 runs from 10 overs as Bangladesh won by five wickets. At the end of the tour, Mashrafe was described as "Bangladesh's solitary cutting edge", underlining how important his bowling is to the team.

Mashrafe was selected as a reserve player for the Asian squad in the inaugural Afro-Asia Cup. He was later drafted into the full squad as a replacement for the unavailable Rana Naved-ul-Hasan. With batsman Mohammad Ashraful, he was one of two Bangladeshi players in the 15-man squad. Sultan Rana, the Asia team manager, described Mashrafe as "a very promising prospect, a terrific asset to the Bangladesh team". He played two of the three ODIs where he took Shaun Pollock's wicket in the first one.

=== Further Injuries ===
In September 2005 a back injury meant that Mashrafe had to return home from Bangladesh's tour of Sri Lanka before the start of the first Test. It was the sixth time he had been sent home in the middle of a series. The injury—a type of stress fracture expected to take between six and twelve weeks to heal—saw Mashrafe unable to play any cricket for several months. He returned to the Bangladesh team in February 2006 for a series of ODIs against Sri Lanka.

Australia visited Bangladesh in April 2006 and Mashrafe played the whole series. Despite coming close to winning the first Test, Bangladesh ultimately lost both Tests in the series. In the final innings of the first Test, Mashrafe dropped a difficult catch off Australian captain Ricky Ponting who went on to see his team to victory with 118 not out. Habibul Bashar, the Bangladesh captain, said of the dropped catch, "If he had taken it we could have seen a different situation, but I must say he tried hard and you all know that he is a whole-hearted cricketer". Bangladesh lost the following three-match ODI series 3–0.

In July and August 2006, Bangladesh toured Zimbabwe for a five-match ODI series. In the 3rd ODI, Mashrafe was hit for six off the final ball of the match by Brendan Taylor, giving the Zimbabweans victory. With Zimbabwe already winning the series 3–1, Mashrafe was dropped for the final match, which Bangladesh went on to win. In the four matches he played in, Mashrafe took five wickets at an average of 29.20. Following their defeat by Zimbabwe, Bangladesh faced Kenya in three ODIs, winning them all. Mashrafe was instrumental in the second victory, coming in with the score on 120/7 chasing 185 to win. He guided his team home with a 43 not out, farming the strike to protect the Bangladesh tail. Mashrafe took career-best bowling figures of 6/26 from his 10 overs in the final ODI, ensuring Bangladesh were chasing a low target. His figures are also the best in ODIs by any Bangladesh cricketer. In the calendar year of 2006 Mashrafe was the world's highest wicket taker in ODIs, collecting 49 wickets. The haul was the most ever in a calendar year by a Bangladeshi, and 17th most for anyone.

In a freak accident shortly before the 2006 ICC Champions Trophy Mashrafe sprained his ankle on the stairs at home. As a result, he was ruled out of the warm-up matches before the tournament which was held on October. Mashrafe recovered in time to play in all three of Bangladesh's matches, taking two wickets at 50.50, as Bangladesh failed to progress beyond the first round.

=== 2007 World Cup and vice-captaincy ===
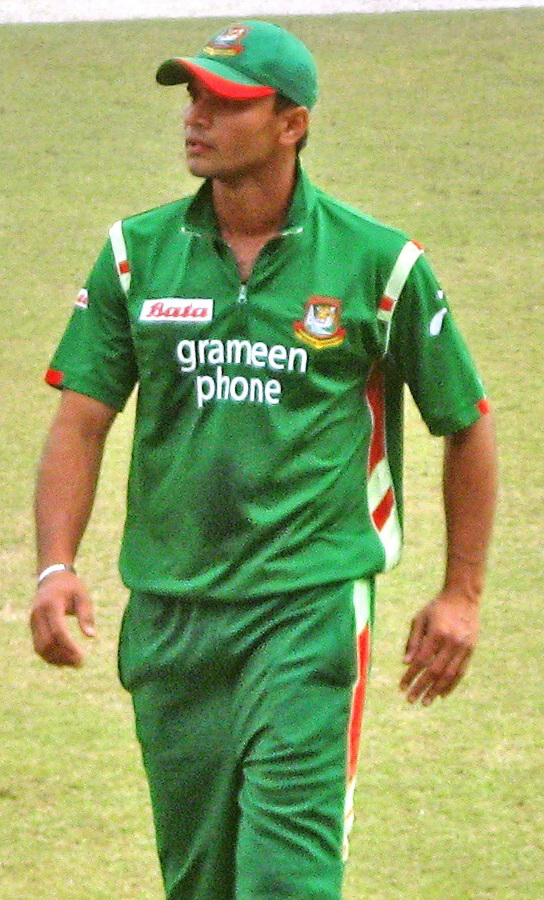
Mashrafe playing for Bangladesh at Sher-e-Bangla National Cricket Stadium in 2009

In February 2007, Bangladesh again toured Zimbabwe for a one-day series, this time as a prelude to the 2007 World Cup. Bangladesh won the four match series 3–1, and Mashrafe finished as Bangladesh's leading wicket-taker with 8 wickets at 16.50. When Bangladesh beat New Zealand in a warm-up match before the World Cup, Mashrafe produced what was described as a "fine all-round display". He took four wickets and scored an unbeaten 30 off 16 balls to ensure victory by two wickets. He was also the man of the match in Bangladesh's victory over India during the group stage of the 2007 World Cup, taking 4/38; at the time they were the best figures by a Bangladesh bowler at a World Cup. (Note: The record was taken by Shafiul Islam who took 4/21 against Ireland in the 2011 World Cup.) Bangladesh progressed to the second round of the tournament, and Mashrafe played in all nine of the team's matches, taking nine wickets at an average of 35.88.

Shortly after the World Cup, India toured Bangladesh for two Test matches and three ODIs. Bangladesh lost the Test series 1–0, but Mashrafe finished as both the team's leading run-scorer and wicket-taker with 151 runs at 50.33 with two fifties—including his maiden Test half-century—and 6 wickets at 38.33. Bangladesh lost the ODI series 2–0. After Habibul Bashar stepped down from Bangladesh's one-day captaincy, Mohammad Ashraful was appointed the team captain in all forms of cricket on 2 June 2007. On the same day, it was announced that Mashrafe was the new vice-captain. When Bangladesh toured Sri Lanka in June and July 2007, Mashrafe took 3 wickets at 91.33 in three Test matches as Bangladesh lost the series 3–0. His poor performance led to suggestions that Mashrafe was uninterested in the series; he denied this and put performance down to a lack of confidence and fatigue from an intensive international schedule over the previous two years. He featured in one match of the three-match ODI series; taking two wickets at 15.50 and Bangladesh again lost 3–0.

Mashrafe was selected for the Asia squad to play in the 2007 Afro-Asia Cup, a three-match ODI series, replacing Pakistan fast-bowler Shoaib Akhtar. Along with spin bowler Mohammad Rafique, Mashrafe was one of two Bangladesh players in the squad. Mashrafe played in two of the three matches, taking one wicket at an average of 108 runs as Asia won the series 3–0. At the inaugural World Twenty20, held in South Africa in September 2007, Mashrafe took two wickets at 80.00 and scored 35 runs at 8.75 in five matches as Bangladesh progressed to the second stage of the tournament. In a match against Australia in the tournament, Mashrafe became one of three victims of the first T20I hat-trick. Brett Lee claimed Shakib Al Hasan's wicket, followed by Mashrafe's and then that of Alok Kapali to help Australia to a 9-wicket win.

When Bangladesh toured New Zealand in December 2007 and January 2008, the team lost the Test series 2–0 and the ODI series 3–0. Mashrafe played in both of the Tests, taking seven wickets at 26.85 and finished as the team's leading wicket-taker. However he was less successful in the ODI series, taking one wicket for 123 runs in three matches. In Bangladesh's two Tests against South Africa in February and March 2008, Mashrafe failed to take a single wicket in either match and his team lost 2–0. As a result of his dip in form, Mashrafe was dropped for the first match of the three-match ODI series that followed. After Bangladesh lost the opening match of the series, Mashrafe returned for the final two ODIs and took one wicket for 45 runs; Bangladesh went on to lose the series 3–0. Ireland toured Bangladesh in March 2008; during the tour Mashrafe and two other Bangladesh players faced disciplinary action for missing a practice session. Bangladesh were undefeated in the three-match ODI series, with Mashrafe collecting four wickets at 22.75 and a man-of-the-match award.

=== 2008–2009 ===
In August and September 2008, Bangladesh toured Australia for three ODIs. Before the ODIs started, Mashrafe was struggling with his persistent knee injury. Bangladesh lost all three matches, and although not missing a match, Mashrafe failed to take a wicket. After the series, doctors examined the knee and identified a collection of fluid in Mashrafe's left knee. He was told that he can continue bowling for up to a year, but then he will require minor surgery to drain the fluid. The operation would keep him from playing cricket for six to eight weeks. In September 2008, Mashrafe was approached by the Indian Cricket League to join the newly formed Dhaka Warriors. The league was not legitimate according to the ICC, whose lead was followed by the Bangladesh Cricket Board (BCB), and the 13 players who chose to join were given 10-year bans by the BCB. Mashrafe turned down the offer, asserting that his main priority was to play for Bangladesh.

When New Zealand toured Bangladesh in October 2008, Mashrafe was part of Bangladesh's maiden ODI victory against New Zealand. He took 4/44 as his team won by seven wickets, but the team went on to lose the series 2–1. He finished as the series leading wicket-taker. In the two-match Test series which followed, Mashrafe took three wickets at an average of 28.33 and scored 92 runs at an average of 30.66 as Bangladesh lost the series 1–0.

When Bangladesh toured South Africa in November 2008, Bangladesh lost the two-match and three-match Test and ODI series 2–0 and 3–0 respectively. Mashrafe was forced to miss out on Bangladesh's warm-up match due to a sore back, but played in all the Tests and ODIs, taking two expensive wickets in each series.

On 6 February 2009, an auction was held in which teams in the Indian Premier League made bids for players for the 2009 Indian Premier League, the second season of the competition. Mashrafe's starting price was US$50,000; the Kolkata Knight Riders and the Kings XI Punjab were involved in a bidding war over Mashrafe, driving up his price. The winning bid was US$600,000 by the Kolkata Knight Riders. Preity Zinta, a stake holder in the Kings XI Punjab team, said "Mortaza is a great player, an all-rounder and we wanted him". Buying Mashrafe was part of the Kolkata Knight Riders' attempt to appeal to a wider audience, including Bangladeshis. Mashrafe played just one match for the Kolkata Knight Riders; in the most expensive spell of the 2009 IPL, he bowled the final over of the match, conceding 21 runs to allow the Deccan Chargers to secure victory.

=== National team and early captaincy ===
In early 2009, Ashraful's position as captain came under scrutiny and the BCB considered possible replacements. Mashrafe, wicket-keeper Mushfiqur Rahim, and all-rounder Shakib Al Hasan were identified as potential successors, but the board decided to let Ashraful remain as captain. Mashrafe was also reconfirmed as vice-captain. Following Bangladesh's early exit from the 2009 ICC World Twenty20, as a result of their defeat by Ireland, Mohammad Ashfraful's leadership was criticised, but stated that he wished to remain captain. In June 2009, the BCB relieved Ashraful of the captaincy so that he could focus on his batting and Mashrafe was appointed captain for the tours of the West Indies and Zimbabwe. Shakib Al Hasan replaced Mashrafe as vice-captain.

In July 2009, Bangladesh toured the West Indies. Mashrafe's captaincy was off to a winning start in his first Test in charge when Bangladesh beat the West Indies. However, he injured his knee and was unable to take to the field on the final day, leaving Shakib Al Hasan to assume the captaincy and lead the team to a historic win; it was their first against the West Indies, their first overseas Test victory, and only their second Test win. This was achieved against a very inexperienced West Indies team as a result of a dispute between the West Indies Cricket Board and the West Indies Players' Association over pay. The first XI had made themselves unavailable for selection and a new squad had to be chosen. Seven West Indies players made their Test debut in the match and the team was captained by Floyd Reifer who had played the last of his four Tests ten years earlier.

Mashrafe's injury prevented him from taking part in the remainder of the tour and his replacement, Shakib Al Hasan, led Bangladesh to a 2–0 and 3–0 victories in the Test and ODI series respectively. The West Indies' dispute remained unsolved for the rest of Bangladesh's tour and the West Indies continued to field an inexperienced team. The knee injury also ruled Mashrafe out of playing on the tour of Zimbabwe in August. In early August, Mashrafe travelled to Australia to undergo arthroscopic surgery on both knees; the expected recovery time from the operation was six weeks. Although Mashrafe was reinstated as Bangladesh's captain for the team's home ODI series against Zimbabwe in October 2009, he did not play in the series. His injury persisted, and he did not play competitive cricket from his injury in July 2009 until February 2010.

Mashrafe took temporary exemption from Test cricket in 2009 due to continuous back injuries for an indefinite time and have not played any test match since

=== Struggles with injury ===
Once his knee had recovered, Mashrafe suffered another setback when he was prevented from playing against New Zealand in February 2010 due to a fever. Mashrafe made his comeback from injury in a match for Bangladesh Cricket Board XI against England during their tour of Bangladesh. Following the match, he commented that he had no interest in regaining the captaincy as in his opinion Shakib Al Hasan had done a good job. He also said that if his injury problems persisted he would contemplate retiring from Test cricket to focus on ODIs and T20s, similar to fellow fast bowlers Shane Bond, Shaun Tait, Andrew Flintoff, and Brett Lee.

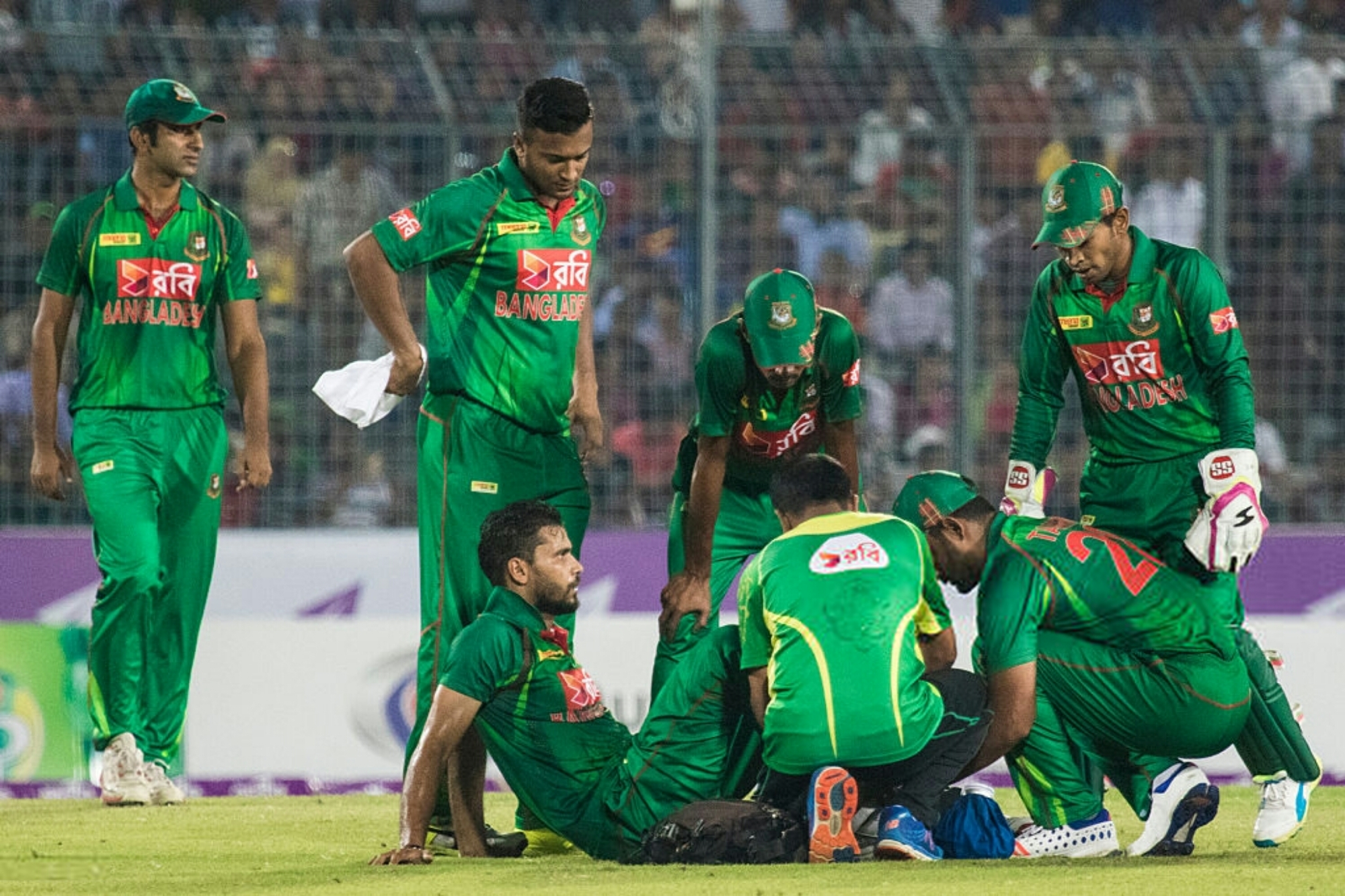
Mashrafe fall down to the ground during his first bowling spell, during match against Afghanistan

Mashrafe declined to play in the Test series to avoid aggravating his knee injury, but played only the first out of the three ODIs against England before withdrawing from Bangladesh's squad as he was about to be dropped. Bangladesh lost the one match Mashrafe played in, and the captain criticised his bowling. Shakib Al Hasan said "The way Mashrafe bowled before his injury, that Mashrafe we might have missed tonight. But the way he bowled in the last match and the practice match, not really. He needs some time to get back to full confidence and rhythm. He needs to play some games and get match-fit again."

Mashrafe continued to struggle for form in the 2010 Asia Cup, held in June, taking just two wickets in three matches at an average of 77.00. The coach, Jamie Siddons, commented that "He's going to have to improve a lot on his current form. Unfortunately there's no ready replacement for Mashrafe at the moment, we're hoping his experience will pull him through. We'll keep looking for others and if Mash can't stand up we'll have to replace him." Siddons also noted that since his comeback in 2010, Mashrafe's bowling has not been as fast as it used to be. In the one-day leg of the return tour in England in July 2010, Mashrafe regain the captaincy of the ODI team. He took over from Shakib Al Hasan who had stepped down after a dip in form. In the second ODI Bangladesh ended their 24-match losing streak; Mashrafe led his country to their first victory over England in any form of cricket. However, Bangladesh were unable to seal a series victory and lost 2–1. Mashrafe finished as joint-lead wicket-taker for the series with five wickets, equal with England's Ajmal Shahzad. Later the same month, Bangladesh played two ODIs against Ireland, and one against the Netherlands; the team managed only one victory against Ireland. Analysing Bangladesh's performance on the tour, Mashrafe noted his concern about the effectiveness of the team's bowling.

In the opening game of Bangladesh's five-match ODI series against New Zealand in October 2010, Mashrafe suffered an ankle injury. As a result, he was unable to play again in the series and Shakib Al Hasan took over. Bangladesh won 4–0, a historic win as Bangladesh had never before won a series against a full-strength Test nation. At the start of November, the BCB announced 16 central contracts. Mashrafe was one of six players in the top level. He returned to the Bangladesh squad for Zimbabwe's tour of the country in December 2010, but Shakib Al Hasan retained the captaincy. By his own admission, Mashrafe struggled for form early in the series but believed that he would improve with match practice. After losing the opening match of the series, Bangladesh won the next three encounters and beat Zimbabwe 3–1; Mashrafe finished with three wickets from four matches at an average of 32.66. At the end of the series Shakib praised the performance of his fast bowlers in the closing matches. While batting for Abahani in a Dhaka Premier Division League match in December, Mashrafe suffered a tear of his knee ligament. When the injury meant he was omitted from Bangladesh's 15-man squad for the 2011 World Cup in February, Mashrafe said that it was "the most painful day" of his life. He hoped to recover in time, and when it was announced that Mashrafe had not been included in the World Cup squad there was rioting in Bangladesh and in one place a half-day strike.

=== Comeback and re-emergence: 2012 ===
Mashrafe was recalled to the squad to face Australia in three ODIs in April. He finished as the team's leading wicket-taker with five wickets at an average of 29.00 from two matches, however he conceded runs at more than eight an over, the second highest in the series of those who had bowled at least ten over. Bangladesh lost the series 3–0 and in the third match, Mashrafe took his 150th ODI wicket with the dismissal of Callum Ferguson. The knee injury incurred in December required surgery which was deferred until May; the operation left him unable to play cricket until at least October.

The Bangladesh Cricket Board founded the six-team Bangladesh Premier League in 2012, a twenty20 tournament to be held in February that year. An auction was held for teams to buy players, and Mashrafe was bought by the Dhaka Gladiators for $45,000. On his return to competitive cricket Mashrafe was made captain of Dhaka Gladiators. Before the tournament had started, he reported to have been approached with a request to participate in spot-fixing. Led by Mashrafe, who took ten wickets from eleven matches, Dhaka won the BPL's inaugural season. Shortly after the tournament concluded, Bangladesh hosted the 2012 Asia Cup; after losing to Pakistan the previous December, five new players called into Bangladesh's 15-man squad, including Mashrafe who was making his come back to the national team after injury. When the BCB announced its central contracts for 2012 in March, Mashrafe retained his top-level contract. Against expectations Bangladesh progressed to the cup final against Pakistan; it was just the second time Bangladesh had reached the final of a tournament. Though he had played in the BPL, bowling ten overs in the ODIs, as opposed to just four per match, proved to be a challenge for Mashrafe. Though in the penultimate game he struggled he regained full fitness to bowl in the final, and finished as Bangladesh's leading seamer with six wickets from four matches.

=== 2015–2016 : Quarter finals and consecutive series wins ===
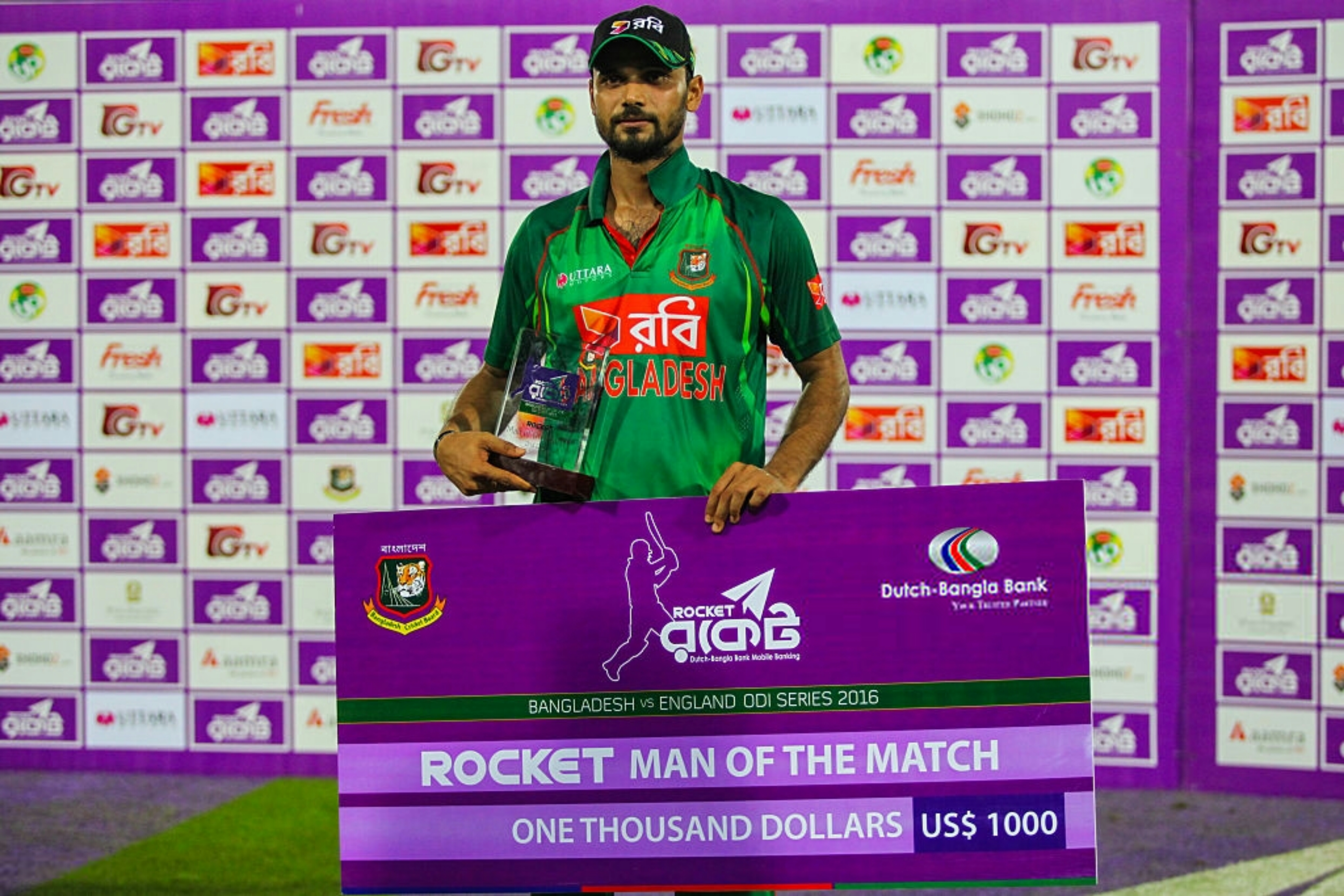
Mashrafe become man of the match for his all-round performance against England in Dhaka

Mashrafe led his team to the Quarter Finals of the World Cup for the first time when they beat Scotland, Afghanistan and England in the group stage. Although losing the quarter finals to India meant Bangladesh didn't proceed any further on the tournament, it was Bangladesh's highest achievement at that time on any world tournament before qualifying for the semi-finals on the 2017 Champions Trophy. Throughout the tournament, the attacking captaincy and tactics of Chandika Hathurusingha and Mashrafe was highly praised.

After the world cup, Bangladesh emerged with a new attacking brand of cricket, winning their home series against India and beating Pakistan (3–0) to became finalists on 2016 Asia Cup.

Mashrafe Mortaza's record as captain
Format ↓	Matches	Won	Lost	Drawn/NR
Test	1	1	0	0
ODI	88	50	36	2
T20I	28	10	17	1
Last updated on: 6 March 2020

=== 2017: Champions Trophy ===
Mashrafe then captained Bangladesh to qualify for the semi-finals in 2017 ICC Champions Trophy after their win against New Zealand, and draw against Australia. However, they failed to beat the hosts England in the final match of Group A.

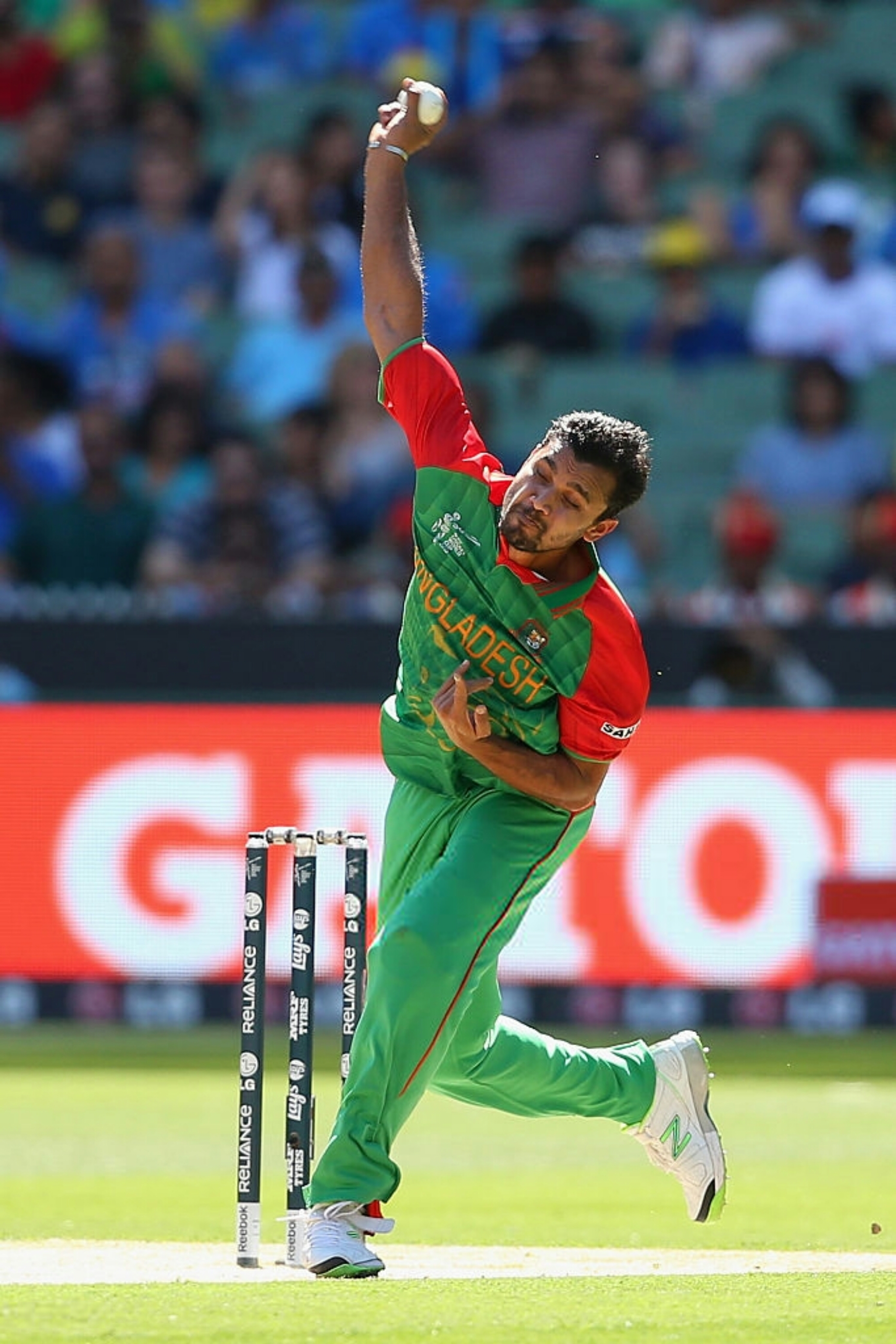
Mashrafe bowling against India in the 2015 Cricket World Cup

=== 2018-present ===
In Asia Cup 2018, Bangladesh beat Pakistan, Sri Lanka and Afghanistan to reach to the finals of the season. They became runners-up of the tournament by narrowly losing to India in the final.

In December 2018, during Bangladesh's series against the West Indies, Mashrafe played in his 200th ODI match. This includes two matches for the Asia XI team. In the same series, he became the first cricketer to play 200 ODIs for Bangladesh.

In April 2019, he was named as the captain of Bangladesh's squad for the 2019 Cricket World Cup. But it was a forgettable World Cup for Mashrafe as he only took one wicket bowling 336 balls in the World Cup.

In March 2020, when Zimbabwe toured Bangladesh, prior to the third and final ODI, Mashrafe confirmed that he would be stepping down as Bangladesh's ODI captain after the series. Bangladesh won the ODI series 3–0, with Mashrafe recording his 50th win in an ODI match as captain with victory in the third match.

On 4 January 2021, he was dropped for the first time from the ODI squad since making his debut in November 2001, though he has missed a lot of cricket over the years because of injuries.

On 11 March 2021, he was named amongst 10 leaders from South Asia in Weforum's Young Global Leaders list for leading his team to the finals of three major international tournaments and also playing a significant role in helping people move out of the poverty trap in his hometown of Narail in Bangladesh by launched the Narail Express Foundation, which looks to achieve six goals: offer modern facilities for citizens and a specialized education system, help start an ethical and humane education system, create employment opportunities, increase cultural activities, provide sports training, set up a tourism hub in Chitra river, and transform Narail into an information and communications technology (ICT) and environmentally friendly town.

== Playing style and legacy ==
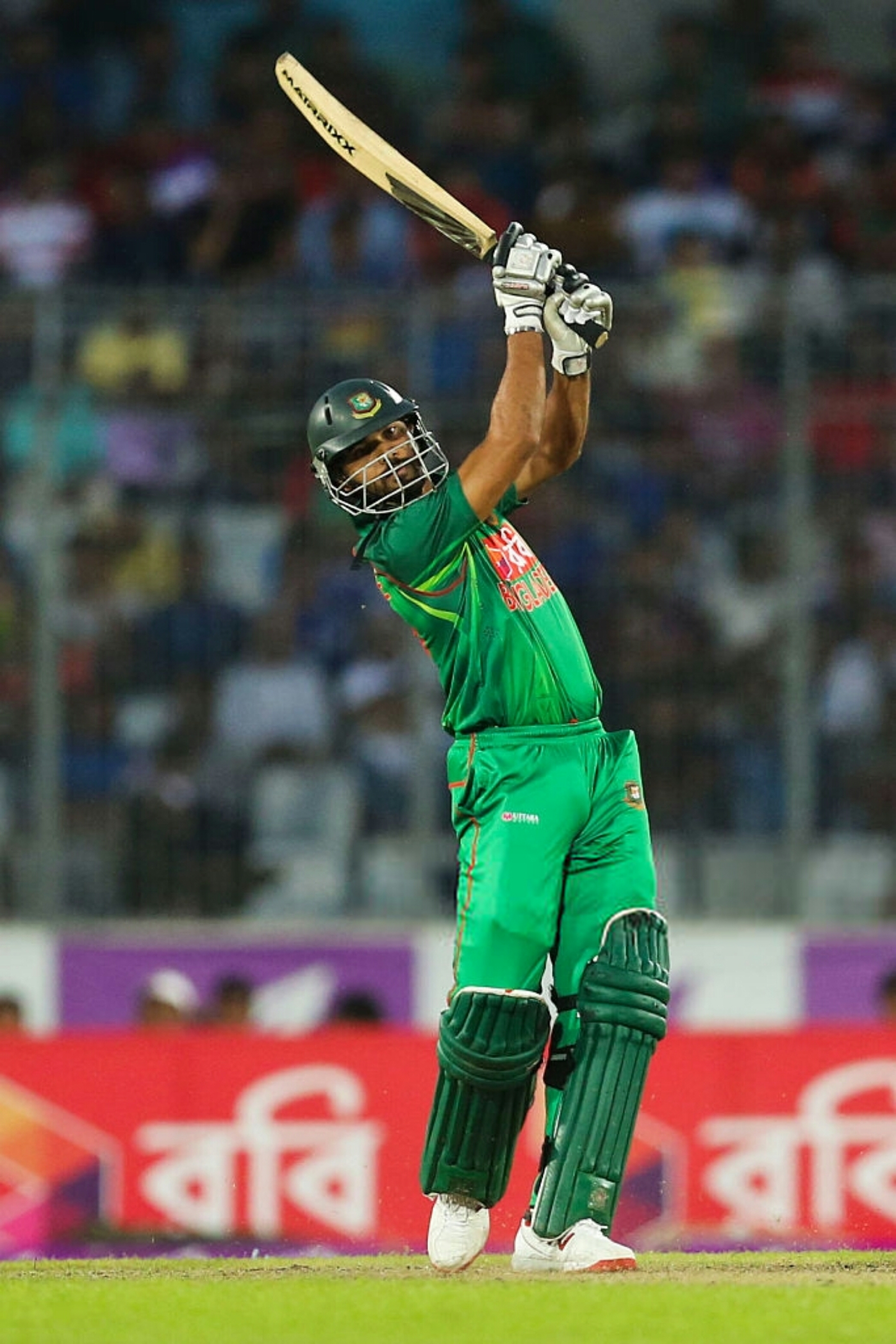
Mashrafe plays a shot against England in Mirpur

Mashrafe used to be considered one of the fastest bowlers produced by Bangladesh, previously bowling in the mid-145s-148s km/h in the 2000s, and regularly opened the bowling. He is a useful lower-middle order batsman, with a first-class century and three Test half centuries to his name.

Pitches in Bangladesh are generally slow and suit spin bowling; the domestic circuit is dominated by spin bowlers and former Bangladesh coach Jamie Siddons suggested the pitches discourages the emergence of fast bowlers. Despite this in April 2008 Mashrafe became the second Bangladesh bowler to take 100 wickets in ODIs and the first fast bowler from the team to pass the landmark. For a long time Mashrafe was acclaimed as the fastest bowler that Bangladesh had produced, before the arrival of Rubel Hossain.

Mashrafe uses his aggressive bowling to challenge batsmen. Although a naturally aggressive player, his accurate bowling has led to comparisons with Australian fast-bowler Glenn McGrath. He has been described by commentators as having "a strong sturdy physic ... sheer pace and stamina with an aggressive frame of mind". After his knee injury, Mashrafe was forced to alter his bowling action slightly, and lost some pace. He has tried to develop his use of reverse swing in an attempt to become a more effective bowler.

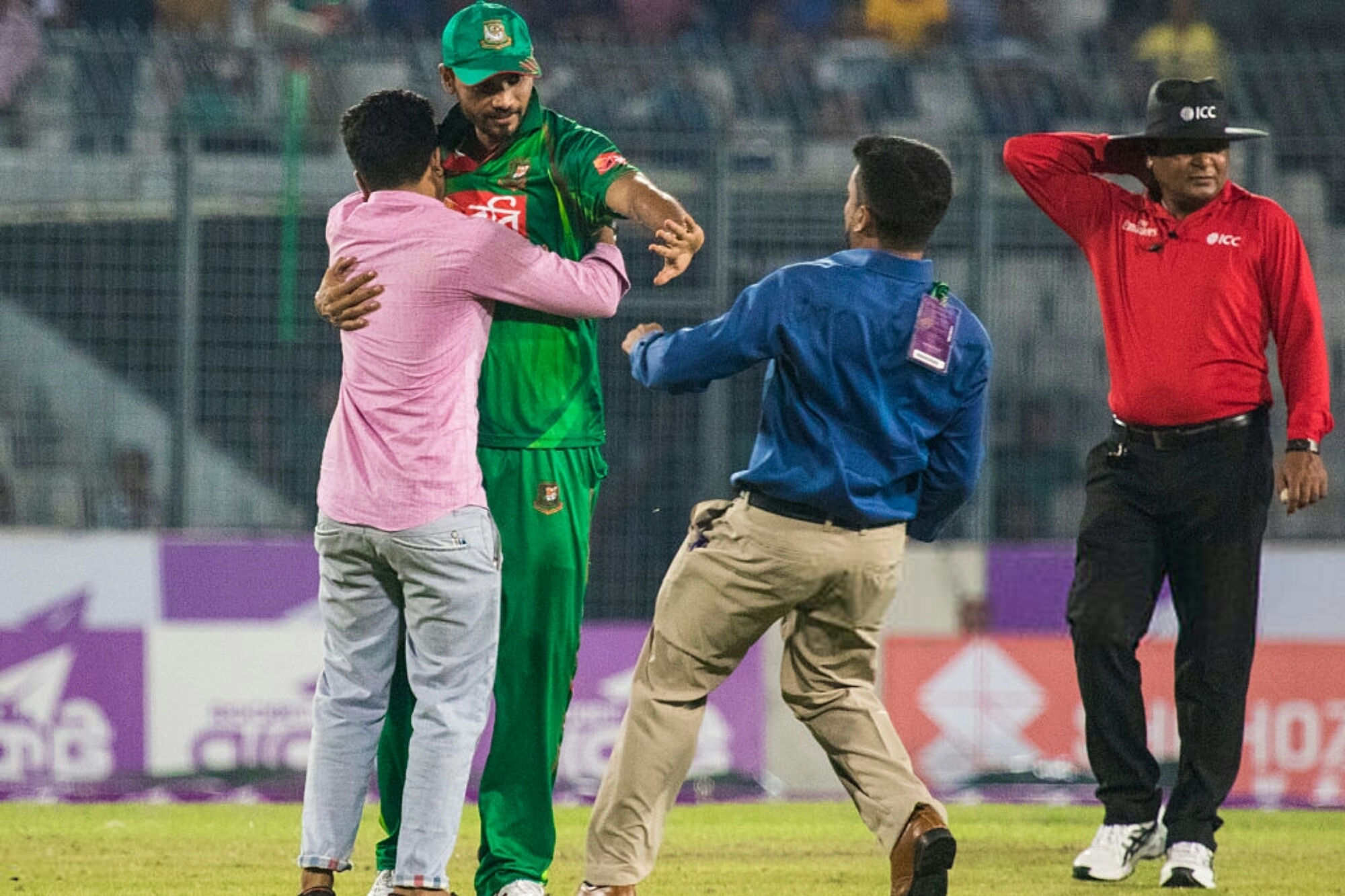
Mashrafe hugged by a fan who breached field security parameters

Jamie Siddons, the Bangladesh coach, has stated that he believes Mashrafe does not get the bowling figures he deserves because "opposing teams tend to see him off and then attack the others". Mashrafe has also commented that "it always puts pressure on the bowlers when their side is bowled out cheaply in the first innings", something that the Bangladesh batting line-up has sometimes struggled with.

Although primarily a bowler, Mashrafe is an aggressive batsman as demonstrated by his high Test match strike rate of 67.20. (Note: 87.55 & 136.10 in ODIs and T20Is respectively) He holds Bangladeshi records for highest strike rate in Tests and ODIs, and for scoring the most runs in an ODI over (26 runs including 4 sixes). Mashrafe's batting is characterised by a reluctance to get in line with the bowling and he prefers to take a step towards square leg to facilitate his powerful shots. He has suffered a plethora of injuries, in his own words from 2007: "Left knee, three operations; right knee, one operation; back, stress fracture—it's better now but still gives some trouble—some shoulder problems; ankles, damaged ligaments twice". Since then he has suffered further injury, and in total has undergone four surgeries on his left knee and three on his right, and three on his ankles.

In March 2020, Mashrafe became the first pace bowler and third player for Bangladesh to take 700 wickets in the professional career after Abdur Razzak and Shakib Al Hasan.

== Retirement ==
Though Mashrafe has not retired from Test cricket, he was forced to quit playing Test matches after he injured his right leg while captaining the team for the first time in 2009 against West Indies. Since then, he has not represented his country in any test matches. Considering his injuries and several surgeries, BCB has not allowed him to play in the longer format.

On 4 April 2017, Mashrafe announced his retirement from Twenty20 internationals after the tour of Sri Lanka. He played his last T20I on 6 April 2017 against Sri Lanka at the R. Premadasa Stadium.

In March 2020, when Zimbabwe toured Bangladesh, ahead of the tour, the BCB announced that it would be Mashrafe's last series as captain of the ODI team. Prior to the third ODI, Mashrafe confirmed that he would be stepping down as Bangladesh's ODI captain after the series.

Though Mashrafe hasn't officially declared his retirement from ODI cricket, he is currently not playing regularly for Bangladesh and hasn't named in the squads in recent series against West Indies and New Zealand. On June 5, 2021, during his interview with a cricket news website, Mashrafe went on to reveal that the Bangladesh Cricket Board was rushing to bid him farewell and forced him to retire.

== Personal life ==
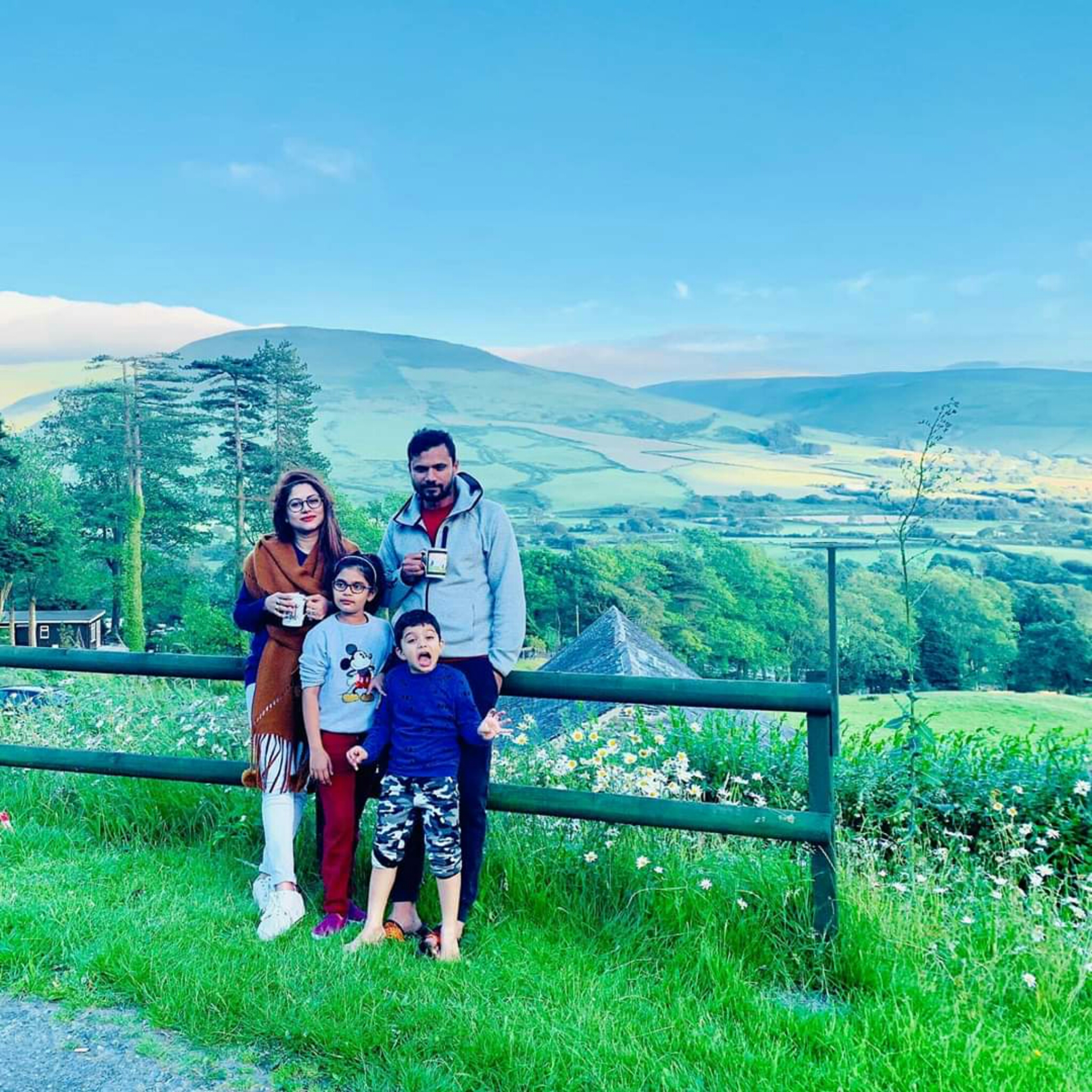
Mashrafe with his family.

While studying at Govt. Victoria College, Narail, Mashrafe met Sumona Haque Sumi, whom he married in 2006. The couple has a son and a daughter.

== Political career ==
Although he had never been involved in politics during his cricket career, Mashrafe collected an MP nomination form for the 2018 Bangladeshi general election on 11 November 2018 under Awami League's banner. In December 2018, he won a seat in parliament, with 96% of the votes in his constituency, Narail-2. He contested the election from Narail-2 constituency and after the declaration of results he eventually won the seat by a huge margin by 2,71,210 votes from his rival.

In February 2019, he became a member of the Parliamentary Standing Committee on Youth and Sports Ministry of the eleventh Jatiya Sangsad. He is also the youth and sports secretary of Bangladesh Awami League since December 2022.

Mashrafe was made the youth and sports affairs secretary of former ruling party Awami-League (AL).

In January 2024, he was appointed as a Whip of Jatiya Sangsad.

In July 2024, Mashrafe was criticised by protesters and the general public for staying silent during the Student–People's uprising which is now being referred to as July massacre. After the overthrow of Prime Minister Sheikh Hasina in the aftermath of the quota movement, Student-People's uprising and the Non-Cooperation movement, the President of Bangladesh dissolved the Parliament on 6 August 2024, causing Mashrafe to lose his seat. His house in Narail was set on fire by the angry protestors.

== Achievements and awards ==
=== National honours ===
==== National Sports Awards ====
- 2010 - National Sports Awards, by the Government of Bangladesh in recognition of his outstanding achievement in sports.

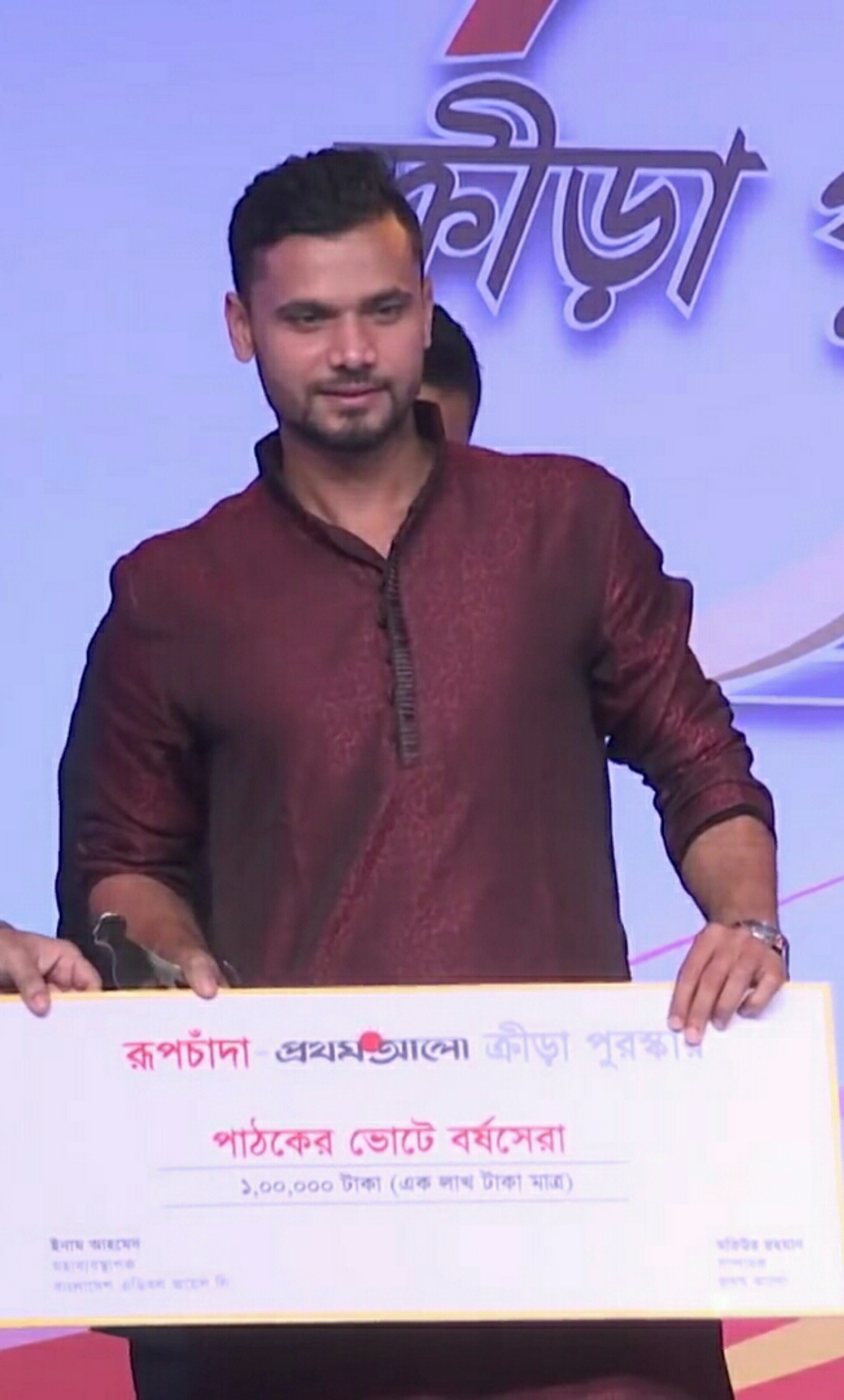
Mashrafe Mortaza receives the People's Choice award by Prothom Alo in Dhaka on May 28, 2018

==== National Board of Revenue Awards ====
- 2016 -National Board of Revenue (NBR), "Highest Taxpayers in Sports Category" by the Government of Bangladesh.
- 2017 -National Board of Revenue (NBR), "Highest Taxpayers in Sports Category" by the Government of Bangladesh.
- 2018 -National Board of Revenue (NBR), "Highest Taxpayers in Sports Category" by the Government of Bangladesh.
- 2019 -National Board of Revenue (NBR), "Highest Taxpayers in Sports Category" by the Government of Bangladesh.

==== Meril Prothom Alo Awards ====
- 2017 - Outstanding Achievement in Sport and the "Sports Award of the Year" at Meril Prothom Alo Awards in Dhaka.
- 2018 - Outstanding Achievement in Sport and the "Peoples Choice Award" at Meril Prothom Alo Awards in Dhaka.

==== Award for Lifetime Achievements ====
- 2019- "Lifetime Achievement Award" by Amader Shomoy.

==== Others ====
- 2015- Kool-BSPA "Real Sportsman Award".
- 2018- Mercantile Bank "Eminent Personalities of the Year".
- 2019- "Successful Entrepreneur" by Bangladesh Digital Social Innovation Forum.

=== International honours ===
- 2017 - "Best Bengali Sportsman of the Year" by ABP Group of India.
- 2023 - MCC Honorary Life Member by the Marylebone Cricket Club (MCC)

== Biographies ==
=== Books ===
1. মাশরাফি (Mashrafe)
2. মানুষ মাশরাফি (The Person Mashrafe)
3. মাশরাফিনামা (Mashrafenama)
4. মাশরাফির দেশে ক্রিকেটার ভূত (Cricket ghost in the country of Mashrafe)
5. মাশরাফির সঙ্গে ক্রিকেট আনন্দে (Cricket rejoices with Mashrafe)
6. মাশরাফির জন্য ভালোবাসা (Love for Mashrafe)
7. কৌশিক থেকে মাশরাফি (Koushik to Mashrafe)
8. উৎপল শুভ্রের মুখোমুখি মাশরাফি (Mashrafe face to face with Utpol Shuvro)
9. অধিনায়ক (Captain)
10. কথায়-আড্ডায় মাশরাফি (Interviews with Mashrafe)

== Notes ==
Sporting positions
Preceded by Mohammad Ashraful	Bangladesh national cricket captain 2009	Succeeded by Shakib Al Hasan
Preceded by Shakib Al Hasan	Bangladesh national cricket captain 2010	Succeeded by Shakib Al Hasan
Preceded by Mushfiqur Rahim	Bangladesh ODI captain 2014	Succeeded by Tamim Iqbal
