= Abdul Quader Sikder =

Bangladeshi politician

- আবদুল কাদের সিকদার

Member of the Bangladesh Parliament for Narail-2
- In office 15 February 1996 – 12 June 1996
- Preceded by: Sharif Khasruzzaman
- Succeeded by: Sharif Khasruzzaman

Personal details
- Born: c. 1956; Narail District
- Died: 20 May 2021; Narail District
- Political party: Bangladesh Nationalist Party

Abdul Quader Sikder (c. 1956 - 20 May 2021) was a politician of Narail District of Bangladesh and former member of Parliament for Narail-2 constituency in February 1996. (He is also known A Kader Sikder.)

== Political life ==
Sikder is the general secretary of Narail district BNP. He was elected to parliament from Narail-2 as a Bangladesh Nationalist Party candidate in 15 February 1996 Bangladeshi general election. He lost the June 1996 elections by participating in the BNP's nomination.
