= Ataur Rahman Bachchu =

Bangladeshi politician

- আতাউর রহমান বাচ্চু

Member of Parliament
- Incumbent
- Assumed office 12 February 2026
- Preceded by: Mashrafe Bin Mortaza
- Constituency: Narail-2

Personal details
- Born: October 15, 1980 (age 45) Komkhali, Hobkhali Union, Narail District, Khulna Division, Bangladesh
- Party: Bangladesh Jamaat-e-Islami
- Children: 3
- Occupation: Politician, businessman

Ataur Rahman Bachchu (Bengali: আতাউর রহমান বাচ্চু; born 15 October 1980) is a Bangladeshi politician and businessman serving as the Member of Parliament for the Narail-2 constituency. He was elected in the 13th National Parliamentary Election held on 12 February 2026 as a candidate of the Bangladesh Jamaat-e-Islami.

== Political career ==
In the 2026 general election, Bachchu contested the Narail‑2 seat and secured victory with a higher number of votes than his closest rivals, including independent candidate Md Monirul Islam and Bangladesh Nationalist Party candidate AZM Fariduzzaman Farhad. According to reporting by *Bangladesh Sangbad Sangstha*, his win represented a notable success for the Bangladesh Jamaat‑e‑Islami in the Khulna division parliamentary contests.
