= Saif Hafizur Rahman =

Bangladeshi politician

Member of Jatiya Sangsad
- In office 7 May 1986 – 6 December 1990
- Preceded by: Constituency formed
- Succeeded by: Sharif Khasruzzaman
- Constituency: Narail-2

Personal details
- Born: 1958 (age 66–67) Lohagara, Narail, East Pakistan
- Party: Jatiya Party (Ershad)

Saif Hafizur Rahman (Bengali: সাইফ হাফিজুর রহমান), also known by his daak naam Khokan, is a Jatiya Party (Ershad) politician and a former member of parliament for Narail-2.

== Early life ==
Saif Hafizur Rahman was born in c. 1958 in Lohagara, Narail District. He earned his Bachelor of Laws degree from the University of Dhaka.

== Career ==
Rahman was elected to parliament from Narail-2 as a Jatiya Party candidate in 1986 and 1988.
