= Grant Sullivan (cricketer) =

Australian cricketer (born 1984)

Personal information
- Full name: Grant James Sullivan
- Born: 7 March 1984 (age 42); Mackay, Queensland, Australia
- Nickname: Sully
- Height: 1.94 m (6 ft 4 in)
- Batting: Right-handed
- Bowling: Right-arm fast-medium
- Role: Bowler

Domestic team information
- Years: Team
- 2006/07–2009/10: Queensland
- FC debut: 27 October 2006 Queensland v New South Wales
- Last FC: 13 October 2009 Queensland v Western Australia
- LA debut: 25 October 2006 Queensland v New South Wales
- Last LA: 23 December 2007 Queensland v South Australia

Career statistics
Competition	FC	LA	T20
Matches	10	7	2
Runs scored	68	21	0
Batting average	11.33	7.00	–
100s/50s	0/0	0/0	0/0
Top score	22	19	0*
Balls bowled	1385	206	42
Wickets	16	5	3
Bowling average	65.68	34.80	22.00
5 wickets in innings	0	0	0
10 wickets in match	0	0	0
Best bowling	3/18	2/43	2/36
Catches/stumpings	6/0	1/0	0/0
- Source: CricketArchive, 12 November 2011

Grant James Sullivan (born 7 March 1984 in Mackay, Queensland) is a former professional Australian cricketer who played for Queensland.
