= Sharif Khasruzzaman =

Bangladeshi politician

- শরীফ খসরুজ্জামান
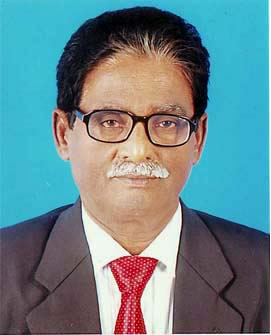

Member of Jatiya Sangsad
- In office 1991 – 15 February 1996
- Preceded by: Saif Hafizur Rahman
- Succeeded by: Abdul Quader Sikder
- Constituency: Narail-2
- In office June 1996 – 2001
- Succeeded by: Sheikh Hasina

Personal details
- Born: 1945 Babra, Lohagara, Narail, Bengal Presidency, British India
- Died: 18 July 2018 (aged 72–73) Anwar Khan Modern Hospital, Dhanmondi, Dhaka, Bangladesh
- Citizenship: British India (until 1947) Pakistan (until 1971) Bangladesh
- Party: Bangladesh Nationalist Party
- Other political affiliations: Bangladesh Awami League (before 2008)
- Occupation: Politician, businessman

ছবি দাও Sharif Khasruzzaman (1945 - 18 July 2018) was a Bangladesh Awami League politician and member of parliament for Narail-2.

== Early life ==
Sharif Khasruzzaman was born in 1945 in Babra village under Joypur union of Lohagara Upazila, Narail District, Bangladesh (then Bengal Presidency of British India). He used to reside in the Khalishpur Housing Estate of Khulna city with his family.

== Career ==
Khasruzzaman started his political life as a student leader in Khulna. During the Liberation War of Bangladesh, he fought as a Freedom Fighter and was the local commander of the Mujib Bahini in Narail. He was elected to the Bangladesh Parliament from Narail-2 as a Bangladesh Awami League candidate in 1991 and June 1996. He joined the Bangladesh Nationalist Party after not receiving the Awami League nomination in 2008.

== Death ==
Sharif Khasruzzaman died on 18 July 2018, Anwar Khan Modern Hospital, Dhanmondi in Dhaka.
