= SK Abu Bakr =

Bangladeshi politician

Member of Bangladesh Parliament

Personal details
- Born: June 6, 1942 (age 84)
- Party: Bangladesh Awami League

Brigadier General (Retd) SK Abu Bakr (born 6 July 1942) is a Bangladesh Awami League politician. He was member of parliament for Narail-2 from 2008 to 2014.
