= Abdus Selim =

Bangladeshi academic

- আবদুস সেলিম
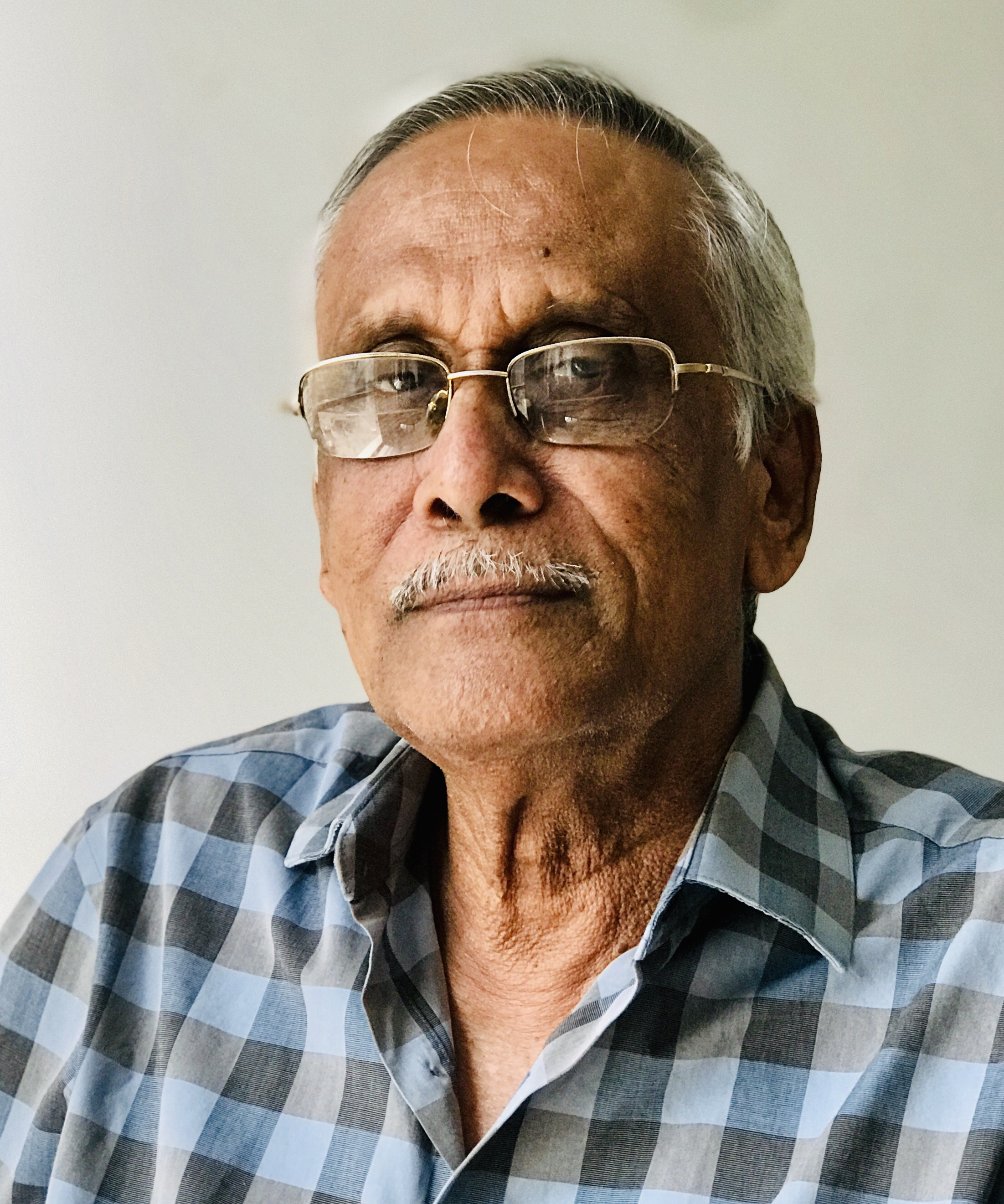
- Selim in July 2018
- Born: 19 September 1945 (age 80); Chuadanga, Bengal Presidency, British India
- Education: University of Dhaka
- Occupations: Academic, writer, translator
- Awards: full list

Abdus Selim (born 19 September 1945) is a Bangladeshi academic, writer and translator. He was awarded Bangla Academy Literary Award in 2015 in the translation category and Shaheed Muneir Chowdhury Award in 2010 for his contribution to theatre. He is currently a faculty member of the Department of English Language-Literature at Central Women's University.

== Background ==
Selim completed his bachelor's and master's in English from the University of Dhaka. He got his breakthrough in translation work by translating Bertolt Brecht's Life of Galileo in 1975 on a request by film director Masihuddin Shaker and was published in 1979. Nagorik Natya Sampradaya theatre group staged the play under the direction of Ataur Rahman in 1988.

== Career ==
Selim taught at the teachers' training college in Libya as well as in England, United States and Germany. He occasionally teaches the Aesthetics of Theatre at Ramendu Majumdar's theatre school. He served as the vice-president and an executive body member of International Theatre Institute. He was a faculty member of the English Department at North South University.

Majority of the drama plays translated by Selim have been directed by Ataur Rahman.

== Translation works ==
- Life of Galileo, Mother Courage and Her Children and Round Heads and Pointed Heads by Bertolt Brecht
- Lady from the Sea by Henrik Ibsen
- One Hundred Sacks of Rice by Yūzō Yamamoto
- The Homecoming and The Birthday Party by Harold Pinter
- Play with a Tiger by Doris Lessing
- Nocturnal Wanderer by Gao Xingjian
- Merchant of Venice by William Shakespeare
- Would-be Gentleman by Moliere
- The Mousetrap by Agatha Christie
- Alice's Adventures in Wonderland by Lewis Caroll
- The Government Inspector of Nikolai Gogol

== Awards ==
- Bangla Academy Literary Award (2005)
- Uchimura Prize (2008)
- Shaheed Muneir Chowdhury Award (2010)
