= Bailey Road =

Bailey Road may refer to:

- Bailey Road, Dhaka in Bangladesh
- Bailey Road, Patna in India
