= Nagorik Natya Sampraday =

Bangladeshi theatre company

- নাগরিক নাট্য সম্প্রদায়
- Formation: 1968
- Type: Theatre group

Nagorik Natya Sampraday is a Bangladeshi theatre company. Established in 1968, it was the first theatre group in Dhaka and started performing plays on stage in 1972. The chairperson of the group is the actor and director Aly Zaker and his wife, actress Sara Zaker, is the vice-chairperson. As of December 2018, Nagorik had performed 46 different productions.

== History ==
The group was founded in 1968 in pre-independence Bangladesh at the residence of journalist and TV personality Fazle Lohani, with the actor Ataur Rahman, and playwright Zia Haider. The troupe produced plays for TV and radio during the East Pakistan era, but could not bring plays to the stage. After Bangladesh gained independence, the troupe staged their first stage production, Michael Madhusudan Dutta's "Buro Shaliker Ghare Ro" in 1972. On 3 February 1973, Nagorik performed the first ever ticketed play in Bangladesh, with Badal Sarkar's "Baki Itihash", directed by Aly Zaker, being staged at the British Council Bangladesh auditorium. Since then, the troupe has regularly staged plays at the Bangladesh Mahila Samiti and Guide House stages.

Over the decades, Nagorik has held productions of plays by playwrights William Shakespeare, Molière, Albert Camus, George Bernard Shaw, Bertolt Brecht and Anton Chekhov, as well as works of Bangla literature by Rabindranath Tagore, Michael Madhusudan Dutt, Dwijendralal Ray, Buddhadeva Bose, Syed Waliullah, Humayun Ahmed and Syed Shamsul Haque. Some of their most iconic productions include "Dewan Gazi'r Kissa", "Achalayatan", "Nuroldiner Sarajibon", "Irsha", "Roktokorobi", "Galileo" and "Opekkhoman".

In April 2018, Nagorik celebrated its Golden Jubilee with a three-day event at Dhaka's Mahila Samiti on Bailey Road. The celebrations included a variety of cultural programmes with songs by Farhin Khan Joyita, and elocution and recitation by Asaduzzaman Noor, Ataur Rahman, Abul Hayat, Nima Rahman and Naila Tarannum Kakoli. There were also stagings of snippets of the troupe's past plays, as well as the premiere of the troupe's newest play, an adaptation of "The Open Couple" by Italian playwrights Dario Fo and Franca Rame. Additionally, the creation of The Nagorik Grant for Creativity in Theatre, and memorial awards dedicated to the late Syed Shamsul Haque and the late Khaled Khan, were announced.

=== Stage productions ===
- Life of Galileo by Bertolt Brecht (2018): In October 2018, a Bangla language adaptation of Brecht's play about the 17th-century Italian polymath Galileo Galilei was performed with Aly Zaker playing the title character. The play marked a return to acting on the stage for Asaduzzaman Noor, who was the Minister of Cultural Affairs at the time. The play was translated by Professor Abdus Selim. The play was performed at Dhaka's Mahila Samiti and Shilpakala Academy.
- The Open Couple by Dario Fo (2018): The two-character play was performed by Sara Zaker and Ziaul Hasan Kislu in May 2018 at Mahila Samiti. The play was adapted and directed by Zaker. In November 2018, Nagorik performed the play in London as part of the London Borough of Tower Hamlets' festival: Season of Bangla Drama

== Notable members ==
Some of Bangladesh's biggest cultural names have been involved with the troupe - Aly Zaker, Sara Zaker, Asaduzzaman Noor, Syed Shamsul Haque, Ataur Rahman, Enamul Haque, Lucky Enam, Abul Hayat, and Khaled Khan, among others.
