= Rashid Haider =

Bangladeshi writer (1941–2020)

- রশীদ হায়দার
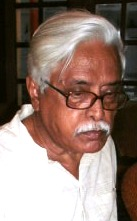
- Haider in 2012
- Born: 15 July 1941; Pabna, Bengal Province, British India
- Died: 13 October 2020 (aged 79); Dhaka, Bangladesh
- Education: University of Dhaka
- Occupation: Novelist
- Relatives: Zia Haider (brother); Makid Haider (brother); Daud Haider (brother)
- Awards: full list

Rashid Haider (15 July 1941 – 13 October 2020) was a Bangladeshi author and novelist. He was awarded Ekushey Padak in 2014 and Bangla Academy Literary Award in 1984 by the government of Bangladesh. He was the author of more than 70 books.

== Background ==
Sheikh Faisal Abdur Rashid Muhammad Ziauddin Haider was born into a Bengali Muslim zamindar family of Sheikhs on 15 July 1941 to Hakimuddin Sheikh and Rahima Khatun in Doharpara in Pabna Town of British India. Hakimuddin was a zamindar in Pabna Town. He graduated in Bangla from the University of Dhaka.

== Career ==
Haider began journalism through the magazine Chitrali since 1961. He was a member of the Pakistan Writers' Guild in 1964. He was a member of Nagorik Natya Sampradaya, founded by his brother Zia Haider. Rashid wrote Toilo Shonkot, and acted in Baki Itihash, the first play by Nagorik.

== Works ==
=== Novels ===
- Khancay (Inside the Cage, 1975)
- Nashta Josnay Ekon Aranya (What Forest is this in the Spoilt Moonlight, 1982)
- Sadh Ahlad (Yearnings, 1985)
- Andha Kathamala (Blind Words, 1987)
- Asamabriksha (Unequal Trees, 1987)
- Mabuhai (1988)

== Awards ==
- Ekushey Padak (2014)
- Bangla Academy Literary Award (1984)
- Nedhushah Literary Prize (1987)
- Humayun Qadir Prize (1987)
- Agrani Bank Prize (1982)

== Personal life ==
Haider was married to Anisa Akhter and they had two daughters, Hema and Khama.
