= Ataur Rahman Khan (disambiguation) =

Ataur Rahman Khan (1905–1991) was a Bangladeshi lawyer, politician, and writer.

Ataur Rahman Khan may also refer to:

- Khan Ataur Rahman (1928–1997), Bangladeshi film actor, director, producer, screenplay writer, music composer, and singer
- Ataur Rahman Khan Khadim (1933–1971), Bangladeshi academic and martyr
- Ataur Rahman Khan Kaiser (1940–2010), Bangladeshi politician
- Md. Ataur Rahman Khan (born 1957), Bangladeshi Supreme Court judge
- Ataur Rahman Khan Angur, Bangladeshi politician
- Ataur Rahman Khan (BNP politician)
- Ataur Rahman Khan (Tangail politician)

== See also ==
- Ataur Rahman (disambiguation)
