= Ata-ur-Rahman =

Ata-ur-Rahman (Arabic: عطا الرحمن) is a masculine Islamic given name. It is built from the Arabic words Ata, al- and Rahman. The name means "gift of the most merciful", ar-Rahman being one of the names of God in the Qur'an, which give rise to the Muslim theophoric names. The letter a of the al- is unstressed, and can be transliterated by almost any vowel, usually by u. Because the letter r is a sun letter, the letter l of the al- is assimilated to it. Thus although the name is written in Arabic and Urdu with letters corresponding to Ata al-Rahman, the usual pronunciation corresponds to Ata ur-Rahman. The transliteration Atta often appears for the first element and Rehman for the last, all subject to variable spacing and hyphenation. Notable people with the name include:

== Given name ==
- Ataurrehman (born 1968), Indian politician
- Ataur Rahman (actor) (1941–2026), Bangladeshi theatre actor and director
- Ataur Rahman (Gaibandha politician), Bangladeshi politician from Gaibandha-4
- Ataur Rahman (poet) (1925–1999), Bangladeshi poet
- Ataur Rahman (politician, born 1951) (1951–2017), Bangladeshi Jatiya Samajtantrik Dal-JSD politician
- Ataur Rahman Bachchu (born 1980), Bangladeshi politician and businessman
- Ataur Rahman Khan, multiple people
- Ataur Rahman Mazarbhuiya, Indian politician
- Ataur Rahman Mazumder (1911–1998), Indian freedom fighter and community leader
- Ata-ur-Rehman (cricketer) (born 1975), Pakistani cricketer
- Atta-ur-Rahman (chemist) (born 1942), Pakistani organic chemist
- Atta-ur-Rehman (politician) (born 1965), Pakistani politician
- Atta-Ur-Rehman Chishti, known as Rehman Chishti (born 1978), British politician
- Atta ur Rehman Memon, Pakistani electrical engineer
- Atiur Rahman (born 1951), Bangladeshi economist
- Md. Atiur Rahman (1939–2013), Bangladeshi academic and politician
