= Ataur Rahman (actor) =

Bangladeshi stage and television actor (1941–2026)

- আতাউর রহমান
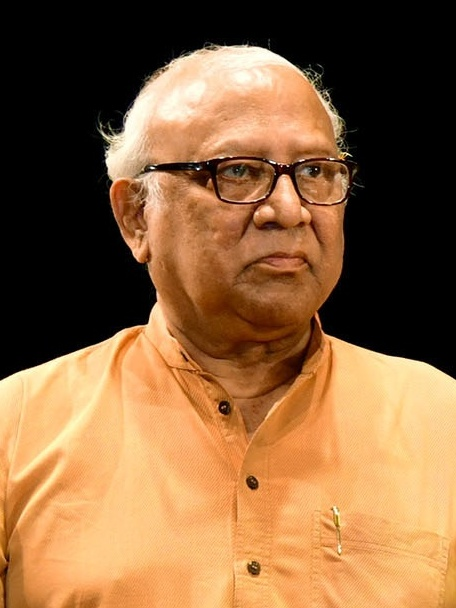
- Rahman in 2022
- Born: 18 June 1941; Noakhali District, Bengal Province, British India
- Died: 12 May 2026 (aged 84); Dhaka, Bangladesh
- Education: University of Dhaka (M.Sc soil science)
- Occupations: Actor, director, writer

Ataur Rahman (18 June 1941 – 12 May 2026) was a Bangladeshi stage and television actor. He was awarded Ekushey Padak in 2001 and Independence Award in 2021 by the government of Bangladesh for his contribution to drama. Rahman was known by the sobriquet Monchosharothi. (Note: Monchosharothi translates as "the stage maestro".)

== Early life and education ==
Ataur Rahman was born on 18 June 1941, at his grandmother's family at Noakhali District in the then Bengal Province, British India. Inspired by seeing Rabindranath Tagore's play Natir Puja, he started taking stage lessons.

Rahman acted in his first stage play along with Abdullah Al Mamun from Shahidullah Hall at University of Dhaka. He earned his master's degree in soil science in 1964 from the university.

== Career ==
Rahman was nominated as the civic theatre community's general secretary, established in 1968. He started directing stage play in 1972 with Buro Shaliker Gare Roo.

He served as the general secretary and later president of Bangladesh Centre of the International Theatre Institute (BCITI). He was the founder general secretary of the theatre troupe Nagorik Natya Sampradaya. He was a onetime chairman of Bangladesh Group Theatre Federation.

Rahman directed over 35 plays including "Roktokorobi", "Banglar Mati Banglar Jol", "Narigon", "Irsha", "Opekkhoman", and "Waiting for Godot".

In August 2019, Rahman was appointed an Awami League Advisory Council member.

He served as the central executive committee president of Bangabandhu Adarsh Forum.

== Personal life and death ==
Rahman had a daughter, Sharmistha Rahman and a son Shashwata Rahman. He died in Dhaka on 12 May 2026, at the age of 84.

== Awards ==
- Independence Award (2021)
- Ekushey Padak (2001)
- Shaheed Munier Chowdhury Award
- "Chakrabak" award as best stage director
- "Loko Natyadal" Gold Medal for stage direction.
- Anyadin & Impress Telefilm award for best character role.
- Alliance Française award for contribution in theatre
- Lifetime Achievement Award by Chanel I Rabindra Mela
- Lifetime achievement of "Bangladesh Group Theatre Federation" .
- Lifetime achievement of Award of International Theatre Institute (ITI).
- Kazi Mahbubullah Lifetime Award
