= Makid Haider =

Bangladeshi writer (1947–2024)

- মাকিদ হায়দার
- Born: 28 September 1947; Pabna District, East Bengal, Pakistan
- Died: 10 July 2024 (aged 76); Dhaka, Bangladesh
- Occupations: Writer, poet
- Relatives: Zia Haider (brother); Daud Haider (brother); Rashid Haider (brother)
- Awards: Bangla Academy Literary Award (2019)

Makid Haider (28 September 1947 – 10 July 2024) was a Bangladeshi writer, poet and recipient of the Bangla Academy Literary Award.

== Biography ==
Makid Haider was born on 28 September 1947 in the village of Doharpara in Pabna District in then East Bengal to Hakimuddin Sheikh and Rahima Khatun. His father Hakimuddin Sheikh was a prominent Zamindar in Pabna Town. Haider was one of seven sons and seven daughters, as well as the sixth amongst brothers, Rashid Haider, Zia Haider, Daud Haider, Zahid Haider, Abid Haider and Arif Haider had been involved in the literature and culture of the country.

Haider died in Dhaka on 10 July 2024, at the age of 76.

== Awards ==
Haider was one of ten individuals to be awarded the Bangla Academy Literary Award in 2019 by the Government of Bangladesh .
