= Zia Haider =

Ekushey Padak recipient (1936–2008)

- জিয়া হায়দার
- Born: Sheikh Faisal Abdur Rouf Mohammad Ziauddin Haider; 18 November 1936; Pabna District, Bengal Province, British India
- Died: 2 September 2008 (aged 71)
- Education: University of Dhaka
- Occupations: Writer, poet, playwright and academic
- Relatives: Rashid Haider (brother); Daud Haider (brother); Makid Haider (brother)
- Awards: Ekushey Padak (2001); Bangla Academy Award (1977)

Sheikh Faisal Abdur Rouf Mohammad Ziauddin Haider (known as Zia Haider; 18 November 1936 – 2 September 2008) was a Bangladeshi writer, poet, playwright, translator and academic. He was the founder president of Nagorik Natya Sampradaya and founder of the Bangladesh Institute of Theater Arts. He wrote seven poems, four plays and translated several plays. He was awarded Ekushey Padak by the Government of Bangladesh in 2001 and Bangla Academy Literary Award in 1977.

== Early life and education ==
Sheikh Faisal Abdur Rauf Muhammad Ziauddin Haider was born into a Bengali Muslim zamindar family of Sheikhs on 18 November 1936 to Hakimuddin Sheikh and Rahima Khatun in Doharpara in Pabna Town of British India. Hakimuddin was a zamindar in Pabna Town. He was the eldest among the fourteen siblings including Rashid Haider, Makid Haider, Daud Haider, Zahid Haider, Abid Haider and Arif Haider.

== Career ==
Haider started his career in journalism. In 1961, he joined the weekly Chitrali. Later, he joined as a professor at the Government Tolaram College, Narayanganj. Occasionally, he took over as the officer of the Culture Department of Bangla Academy. After that, he worked as a senior producer in Pakistan Television. He was the founder professor of the Department of Drama at the University of Chittagong. He started teaching as an Assistant to the Department of Fine Arts in 1970. He founded the Nagorik Natya Sampradaya. He established the Bangladesh Institute of Theater Arts (BETA).
