= Daud Haider =

Bangladeshi poet (1952–2025)

- দাউদ হায়দার
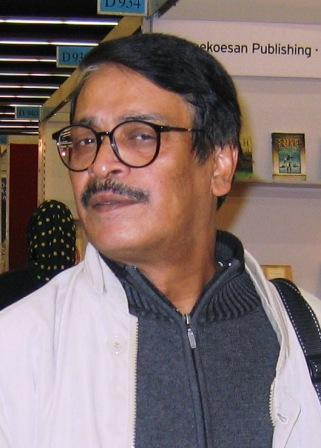
- Haider in Frankfurt (2007)
- Born: 21 February 1952; Pabna District, East Bengal, Pakistan
- Died: 26 April 2025 (aged 73); Berlin, Germany
- Occupations: Writer, poet
- Relatives: Zia Haider (brother); Makid Haider (brother); Rashid Haider (brother)

Daud Haider (21 February 1952 – 26 April 2025) was a Bangladeshi poet who was forced into exile after writing a poem that "insulted" religions, including Islam. American Center, PEN International have described him as a "distinguished poet".

== Early life ==
Daud Haider was born on 21 February 1952 at Doharpara of Pabna District in the then East Bengal, Dominion of Pakistan. He was the eighth child of fourteen siblings. His six brothers were Zia Haider, Makid Haider, Rashid Haider, Zahid Haider, Abid Haider and Arif Haider. Daud was a student at the Department of Bangla of the University of Dhaka.

== Career ==
Haider's poetic style has been described as more focused on "feeling of the masses". He was the literary editor of The Sangbad based in Dhaka. He wrote a poem, Kalo Surjer Kalo Josnar Kalo Bonnai, published in the Sangbad’s literature page on 24 February 1974. He was arrested on 11 March on charges of blasphemy. He was physically attacked for his works. He was imprisoned by the government of Bangladesh. President Sheikh Mujibur Rahman was blamed for forcing him into exile. His ancestral house was destroyed by arson and one of his relatives was killed. He was expelled from Bangladesh on 21 May.

Haider moved to exile in Kolkata, India where he lived for 13 years. In 1987, the Indian government refused to extend his visa. Then Indian Prime Minister Rajiv Gandhi also ignored pleas from PEN America, namely Susan Sontag and Kurt Vonnegut.

Günter Grass, a Nobel laureate German writer who was also living in Kolkata at the time, wrote a personal letter to the then German Foreign Minister, Hans-Dietrich Genscher, requesting that Haider be given asylum in Germany. After the German government approval, Haider moved to Berlin in 1987.

Haider later became a Deutsche Welle (DW) journalist in Germany. He wrote his first articles for DW in 1989, on the topics of homeland and homelessness. He wrote around 30 books while in exile in Germany which were published in India and Bangladesh.

== Personal life and death ==
Haider was an atheist and never married. He rejected a German citizenship offer, instead he held a special UN visa that identified him as "stateless (Bangladesh)".

Haider died on 26 April 2025, at the age of 73, at a clinic in Berlin, Germany. He was buried at St. Michael Cemetery in Hermannstrasse in the Neukölln area of Berlin. Several German media outlets published his obituary. A programme was arranged in his memory at the Kurt-Tucholsky Library.

== Awards ==
- "The best poem of Asia" from the London-based Poetry Society award in 1973.
