= Sheikhs of Bengal =

Sheikh (Bengali: শেখ, romanized: Shekh) is a surname found in the Bengal region of the subcontinent.

== Families ==
- Sheikhs of Tungipara, currently the most powerful political family in Bangladesh
  - Khan Sahib Sheikh Mosharraf Hossain, member of the East Pakistan Provincial Assembly
  - Sheikh Kabir Hossain, businessman and president of Association of Private Universities of Bangladesh
  - Sheikh Shahidul Islam, politician
  - Sheikh Mujibur Rahman, founder of Bangladesh
  - Sheikh Abu Naser, politician
  - Sheikh Salahuddin Jewel, politician
  - Sheikh Helal Uddin, politician
  - Sheikh Sarhan Naser Tonmoy, politician
  - Sheikh Lutfar Rahman, serestadar of Gopalganj civil court
  - Sheikh Sayera Khatun, mother of Sheikh Mujibur Rahman
  - Sheikh Fazilatunnesa Mujib, First Lady of Bangladesh
  - Sheikh Kamal, founder of Abahani Limited
  - Sheikh Jamal, second lieutenant in the East Bengal Regiment
  - Sheikh Rehana, politician
  - Sheikh Hasina, former prime minister of Bangladesh
  - Sheikh Russel, youngest son of Sheikh Mujibur Rahman
  - Qudratullah Sheikh, Zamindar in Faridpur Mahakumar who defeated the British in court, ancestor of Sheikh Fazlul Haque Mani
  - Sheikh Fazlul Haque Mani, Bangladeshi politician and founder of Mujib Bahini
  - Sheikh Fazle Noor Taposh, Mayor of Dhaka
  - Sheikh Fazlul Karim, Minister of health and family welfare
  - Sheikh Shawkat Hossain, former chairman of NPP
- Sheikhs of Pabna Town
  - Sheikh Faisal Abdur Rouf Mohammad Ziauddin Haider, Bangladeshi writer, poet, playwright, translator and professor
  - Sheikh Faisal Abdur Rashid Mohammad Ziauddin Haider, Bangladeshi author and novelist
- Sheikh family of Khulna
  - Sheikh Mohammad Shafiuddin Ahmed, Chief of Bangladesh Army Staff
  - Runu Reza, female politician

== Individuals ==
- Sheikh Mohammad Zakir Hossain, Judge in the Supreme Court of Bangladesh
- Sheikh Mohammad Abdullah, politician, Minister of Religious Affairs
- Mohammad Naim Sheikh, cricketer
- Sheikh Abdul Awal, Judge in the Supreme Court of Bangladesh
- Sheikh Reyazuddin Ahmed, Bengali Litterateur and Author
- Sheikh Md. Rezaul Karim, Awami League Minister of housing and fisheries
- Sheikh Abul Kalam Azad, Bangladesh Navy officer and former high commissioner to Maldives
- Shaikh Yusuf Harun, Bangladeshi government official, executive chairman of Bangladesh Economic Zones Authority

== See also ==
- Khondakar
- Sayyid
- Bengali Kazi
- Sheikh
