= Bangladesh Mahila Samiti =

- Bangladesh Mahilla Samiti
- বাংলাদেশ মহিলা সমিতি
- Abbreviation: BMS
- Formation: February 28, 1972
- Founder: Dr. Neelima Ibrahim
- Type: Governmental
- Legal status: Charity
- Purpose: Ensuring Women's rights
- Headquarters: Bangladesh Mohila Samity Complex Bhaban-4, Natok Shoroni, Bailey Road, Dhaka
- Location: Dhaka, Bangladesh
- Coordinates: 23.7419667°N 90.4084612°E
- Official language: Bengali, English
- Parent organization: Ministry of Labour and Social Welfare of the government of Bangladesh
- Website: https://bangladeshmohilasamity.com/
- Formerly called: East Pakistan branch of ALL Pakistan Women Association (APWA)

Bangladesh Mahila Samiti (Bengali: বাংলাদেশ মহিলা সমিতি) is a women's organization in Bangladesh descended from the All Pakistan Women's Association that was originally established by Lady Rana Liaquat Ali (wife of the Prime Minister of Pakistan) in 1948. The Dhaka branch was opened in 1949. The organization works to improve awareness of legal issues, and to fund education and health access for women.

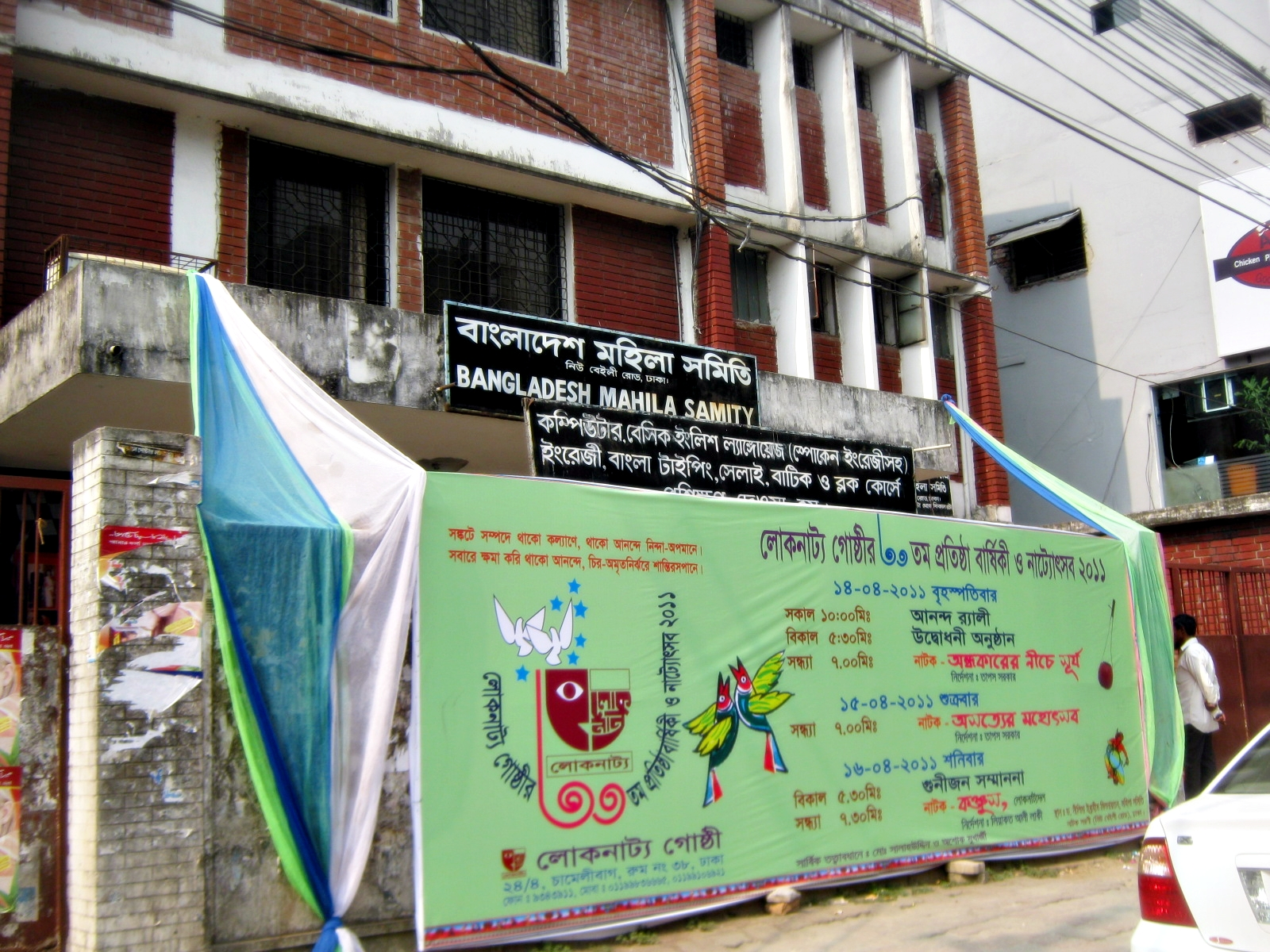
Bangladesh Mahila Samity auditorium, Bailey Road, Dhaka
