= Ataur Rahman Mazumder =

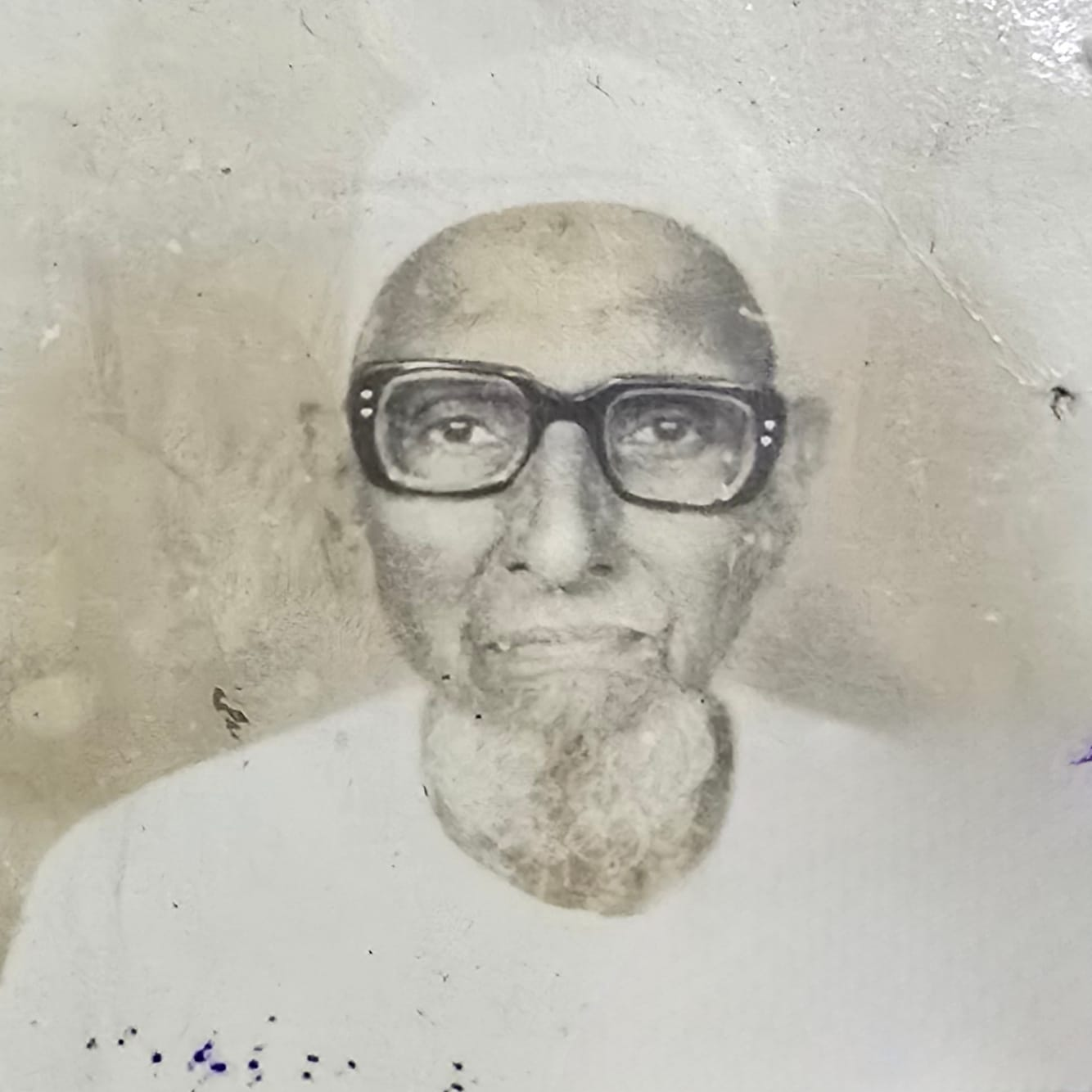
- Ataur Rahman Mazumder in 1984
- Born: Ataur Rahman Mazumder; December 20, 1911; Silchar, Province of Eastern Bengal and Assam, British India
- Died: February 10, 1998 (aged 86); Silchar, Assam, India
- Occupations: Farmer, Freedom Fighter
- Years active: 1921-1998
- Known for: Participation in the Non-Cooperation Movement
- Spouse: Mayarun Nessa
- Children: 9
- Parents: Abdul Matlib Mazumder (father); Amira Bibi (mother)
- Awards: Government of Assam Honorary Memorial Award for Freedom Fighters (1997)
- Website: https://ataurrahmanmazumder.wordpress.com

Ataur Rahman Mazumder (20 December, 1911 – 10 February, 1998), was an Indian freedom fighter, community leader, and patriarch of the Mazumder lineage in Silchar, locally known as Tomru Miya. He participated in the Indian independence movement and later held a role within his family and local community in the Barak Valley region.

== Early life and ancestry ==
Ataur Rahman Mazumder was born in the Silchar region of undivided India, to Abdul Matlib Mazumder and Amira Bibi. His father, a cultivator by profession, was the son of Mujefor Ali Mazumder, who held the title of Mirashdar under the Kachari King. Abdul Matlib is believed to have died in 1951.

The ancestors of Ataur Rahman Mazumder held the position of zamindari under the Kachari Kings. These landholders cultivated their own land and occasionally leased portions to ryots (tenant farmers). While Ataur Rahman himself did not oversee the ryots, it is plausible that his forebears did.

The possession of the Mazumder title suggests that Mujefor Ali Mazumder and his ancestors were financially capable of purchasing a designation valued at approximately Rs. 180,000 in today's currency (Rs. 75 at the time).

== Work and later life ==
=== 1920s ===
Ataur Rahman Mazumder began his career as a textile businessman, frequently traveling to Calcutta to buy and sell garments. He was deeply involved in India's freedom struggle and actively participated in movements led by Indian National Congress leaders. He remained a committed member of the Congress party both before and after independence.

Due to his participation in Mahatma Gandhi’s Non-Cooperation Movement, Ataur Rahman was imprisoned for seven months due to his activism, from 15 November 1921 to 4 June 1922.

=== 1930s to 1950s ===
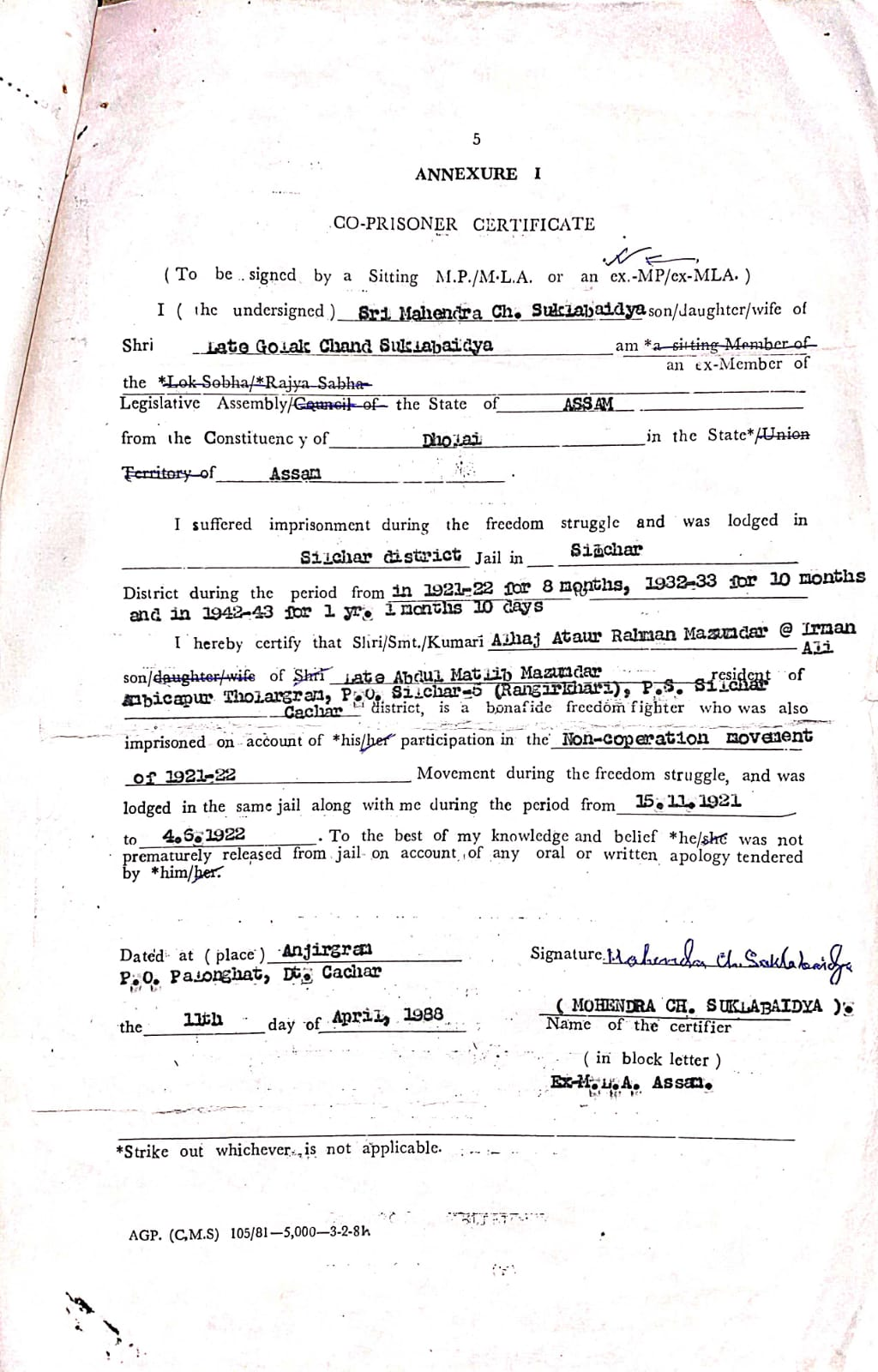
Co-prisoner certificate of imprisonment during the Non-Cooperation Movement of 1921 — issued by Shri Mahendra Chandra Suklabaidya, former MLA of Dholai, Assam, confirming Ataur Rahman Mazumder's eligibility for Indian freedom fighter pension

Throughout the 1930s and early 1940s, Ataur Rahman engaged in various business ventures. In 1942, during World War II, he joined the Air Raid Precautionary Force as an instructor, earning a monthly salary of Rs. 60. He was discharged on 31 July 1945 with the rank of Assistant Superintendent following the demobilization of the force.

After discharge, he invested in hand-pulled carts and rickshaws, renting them out for daily earnings of Rs. 5 to 10. His rickshaw stand was located opposite Satindra Mohon Dev Civil Hospital in Silchar.

=== Post-Independence Years ===
Following India's independence, Ataur Rahman established a grocery and stationery shop in Rangirkhari, which became a stable source of income for his family. He also operated a Fair Price Shop, selling government-rationed food items under an official license.

In his later years, he petitioned the Chief Ministers of Assam for a pension recognizing his role in the freedom movement. After persistent efforts, his request was granted—initially with a pension of Rs. 500, which was later increased to Rs. 3,000.

As his children became financially independent, they took over his care, allowing him to retire peacefully from active work.

== Awards and honours ==
List of awards and honours received by Ataur Rahman Mazumder

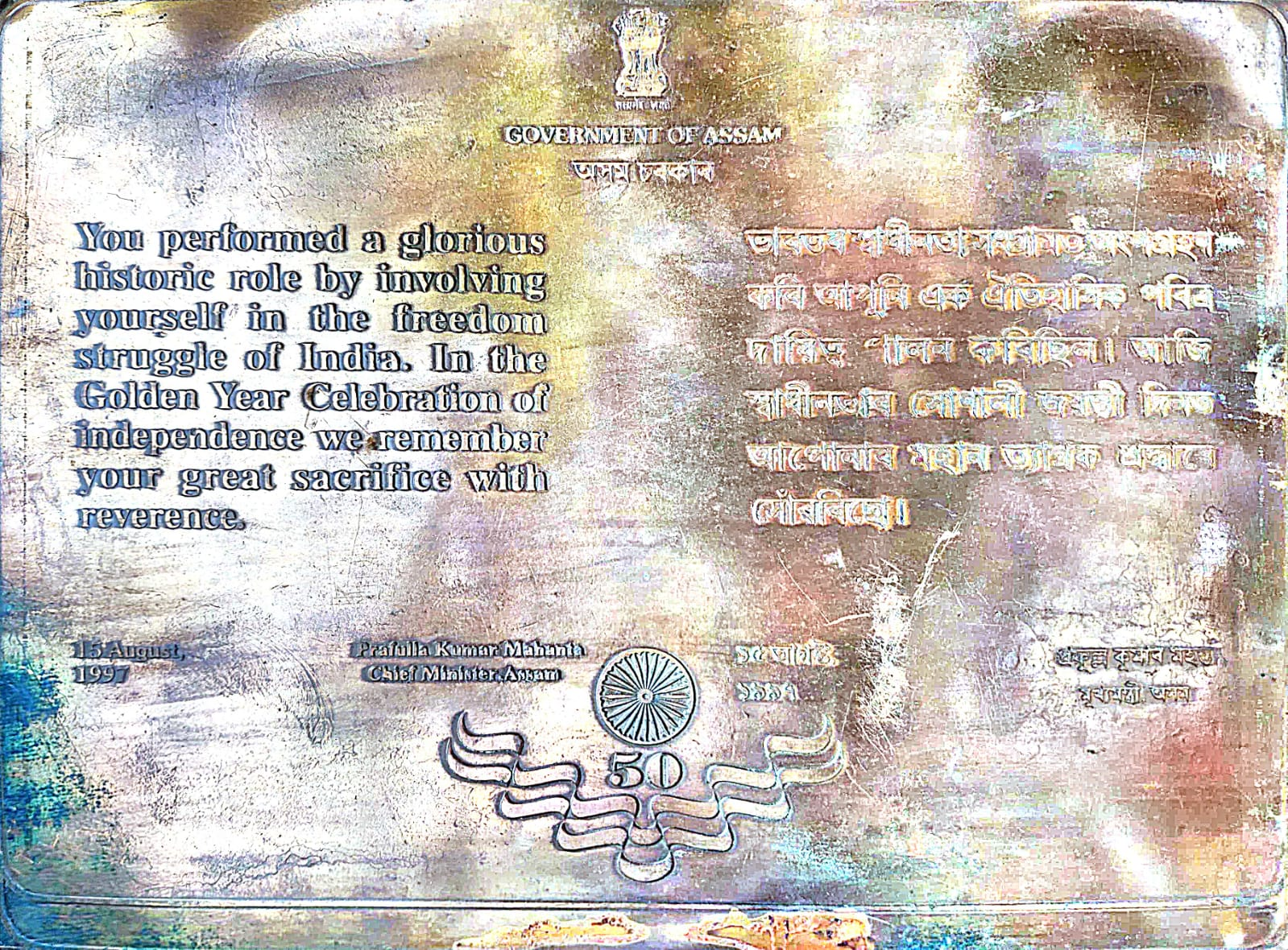
Bronze Plaque presented to Alhaj Ataur Rahman Mazumder in recognition of his dedicated service as a freedom fighter on the occasion of the 50th Anniversary of Indian Independence — Presented/Sent by Shri Prafulla Kumar Mahanta, Former Hon’ble Chief Minister of Assam

- Letter of appreciation sent by Former Chief Minister of Assam Shri. Hiteshwar Saikia on 9 August 1993.
- A Bronze Plaque was presented to Alhaj Ataur Rahman Mazumder in recognition of his dedicated service as a freedom fighter on the occasion of the 50th Anniversary of Indian Independence — Presented/Sent by Shri Prafulla Kumar Mahanta, Former Hon’ble Chief Minister of Assam Government Honorary Memorial, 15 August 1997 – Commemorative Plaque Offered as a Tribute to Freedom Fighters.

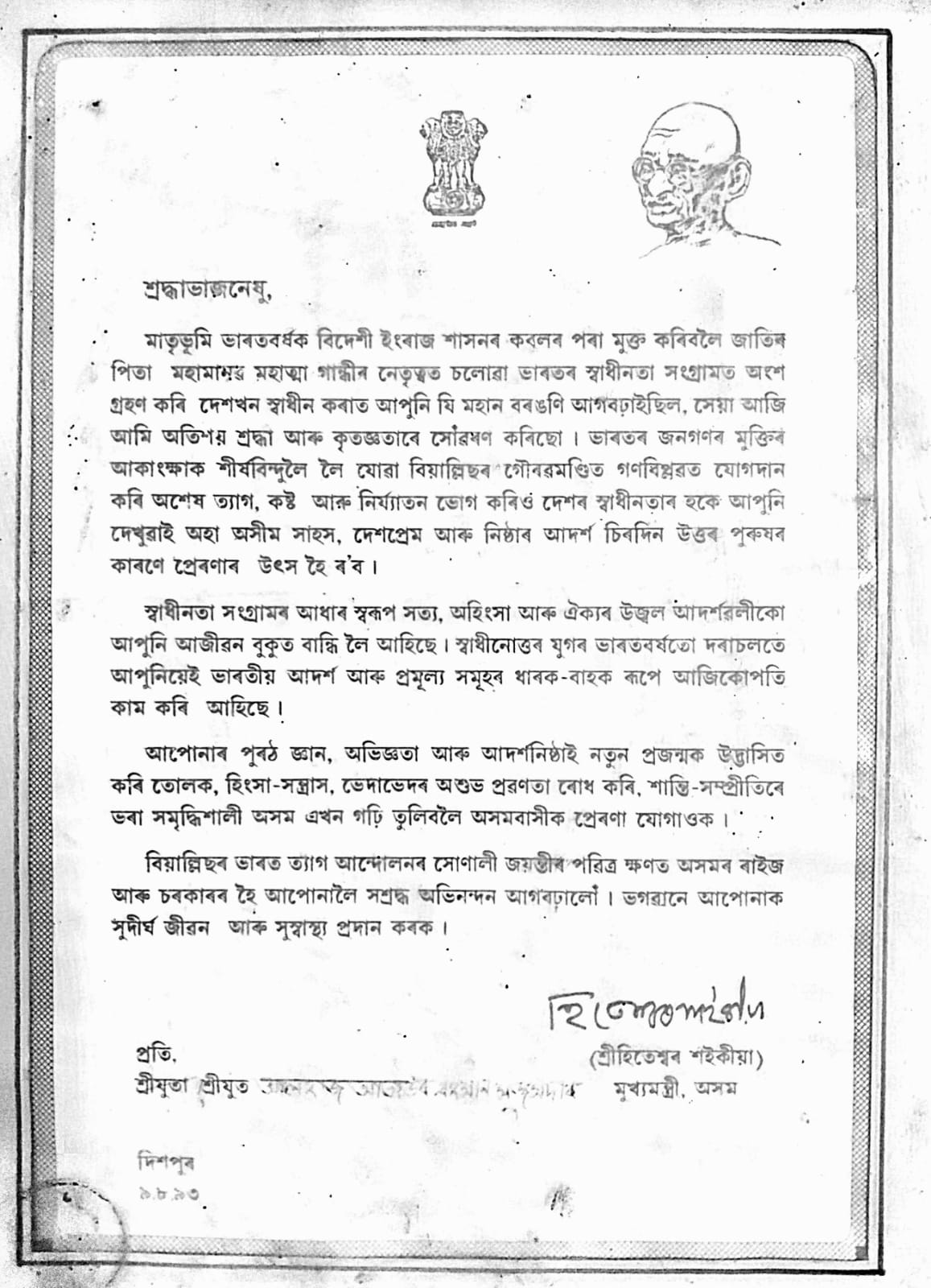
Letter of appreciation sent by Former Chief Minister of Assam Shri. Hiteshwar Saikia on 09th August 1993.
