= Bailey Road, Dhaka =

Road in Dhaka, Bangladesh

Coordinates: 23.740874°N 90.402445°E

Bailey Road
- Natok Sarani
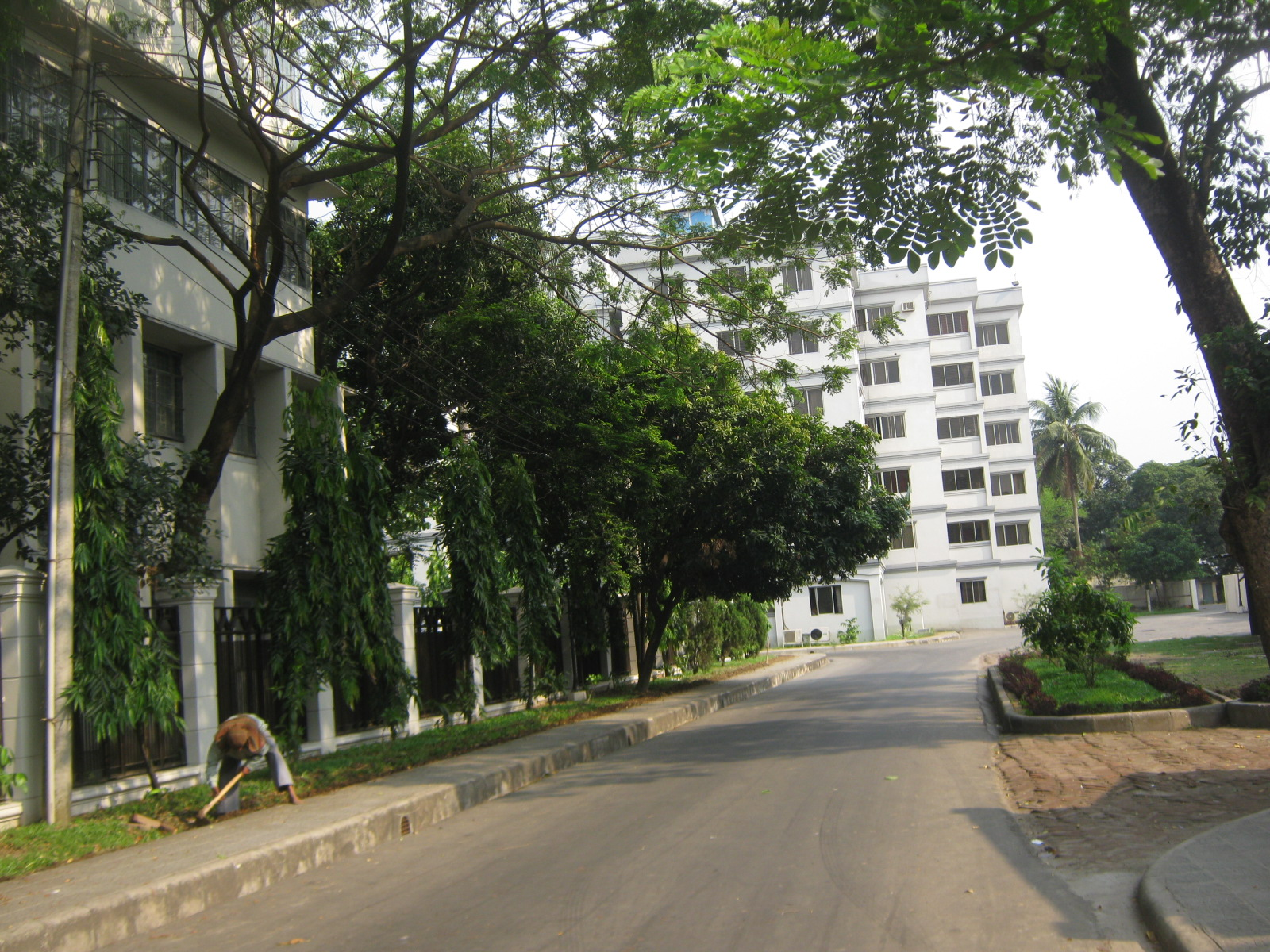
- Residence of officials and ministers
- Interactive map of Bailey Road
- Native name: বেইলি রোড (Bengali)
- Maintained by: Dhaka South City Corporation
- Location: Ramna, Dhaka, Bangladesh
- Postal code: 1217
- West end: Hare Road, opposite to Ramna Park
- Major junctions: Shantinagar
- East end: Bir Uttam Shamsul Alam Road

Other
- Known for: Educational institutions, government offices and hostels, shopping and eateries

Bailey Road is a well-known thoroughfare and an upscale area in Ramna, Dhaka, the capital city of Bangladesh. It is a classic road in Dhaka that runs through Shiddheswari, connecting Hare Road with Shantinagar junction. It is regarded as one of the busiest areas of the city, constructed during the colonial era, now serving both as a residential area for civil servants, high court judges as well as government officers, and hosting shopping malls and food courts. The Bailey Road is considered as two distinct roads, one after another, they are the new Bailey Road and the Bailey Road. The New Bailey Road is well recognised for its famous theatres, numerous boutiques, shops, schools, fast food, restaurants, and various hangout places. The old Bailey Road is reputable because of the officers club, Foreign Service Academy, and homes of ministers and government officials. Bailey Road was featured in a song of the same name by Ayub Bachchu, lead singer of the popular rock band LRB. Bailey Road was officially renamed Natok Soroni (Theater Street) in recognition of the road's contributions to performing arts in the capital.

== History ==
Ramna was a forest-like area during British rule. Initially, Charles Dos, the magistrate of Dhaka, was responsible for its development. He transformed that area into a racecourse and garden, which the high class and rich people of that time used to visit. In 1840 it developed into a small town. Gradually, people started building houses on the north side of Ramna. In 1859, the surveyor general divided Ramna into two different parts, they are the Ramna plains and the race course. The government tried to modify the Ramna plains and turn it into the new capital city. He wanted to achieve this by building roads through 100 acres of greenspace. Beside the roads were several great buildings made for the residence of higher officials such as the governor, justice, council members, secretaries, and division heads. Coming back from the scenes of Mughal Empire, even today Ramna has remained one of the most notable and sophisticated areas. Bailey Road, which runs through Ramna, is also one of the most prominent and prestigious roads in Dhaka.

Bailey Road was named in honour of Sir Steuart Colvin Bayley, Lieutenant-Governor of Bengal from 1879 to 1882. However, in recognition of Bailey Road's importance to the theatre community of Dhaka, on 26 August 2005, the mayor of Dhaka, Sadek Hosen Khoka, announced that the name of the road would change to Natok Soroni, meaning "Theater Road", in a ceremony that was attended by theater personalities including Sayed Ahmed, Liakat Ali Lucky, M Hamid, Ramendu Majumdar and Mamunur Rashid.

== Theater Street ==
Bailey Road has been the centre of theatre practices as well as theatre performers. The stage productions of Dhaka's major drama companies are usually performed on Bailey Road. Over the years, its theatres have played host to some of the country's best actors and actresses. The two major theatres on the road that regularly host local and international theatre performances are:

=== Guide House Auditorium ===
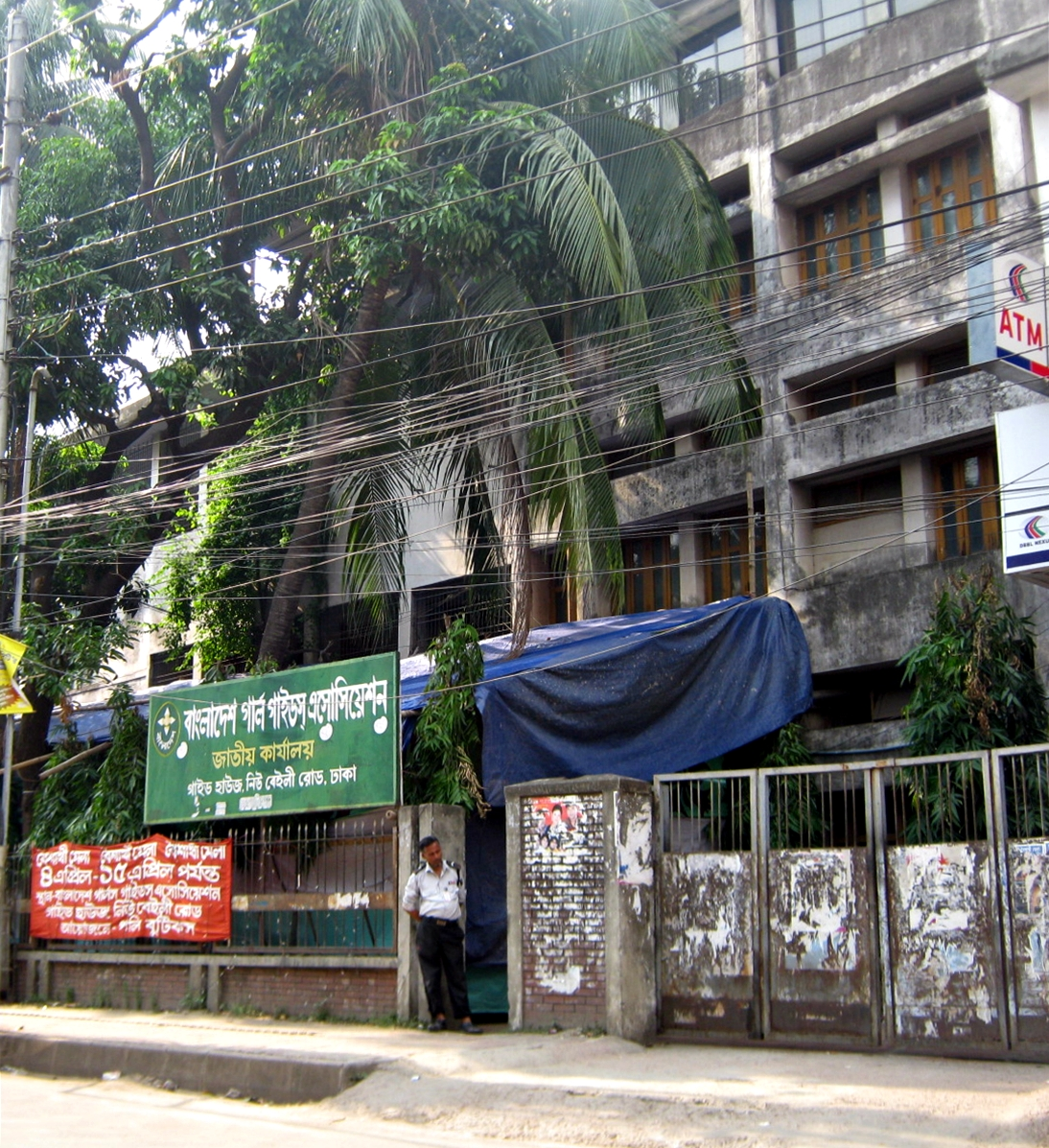
Guide House Auditorium

The Guide House was established in 1964 as the headquarters of the East Pakistan Branch of the Pakistan Girl Guides Association. The auditorium was built in 1982 to create a funding stream for what was by then the Bangladesh Girl Guides Association. In 2003–04 the auditorium underwent a structural upgrade with advice from eminent theatre personalities M Hamid, Jamaluddin and Nasiruddin Yusuf.

=== Mahila Samity auditorium ===
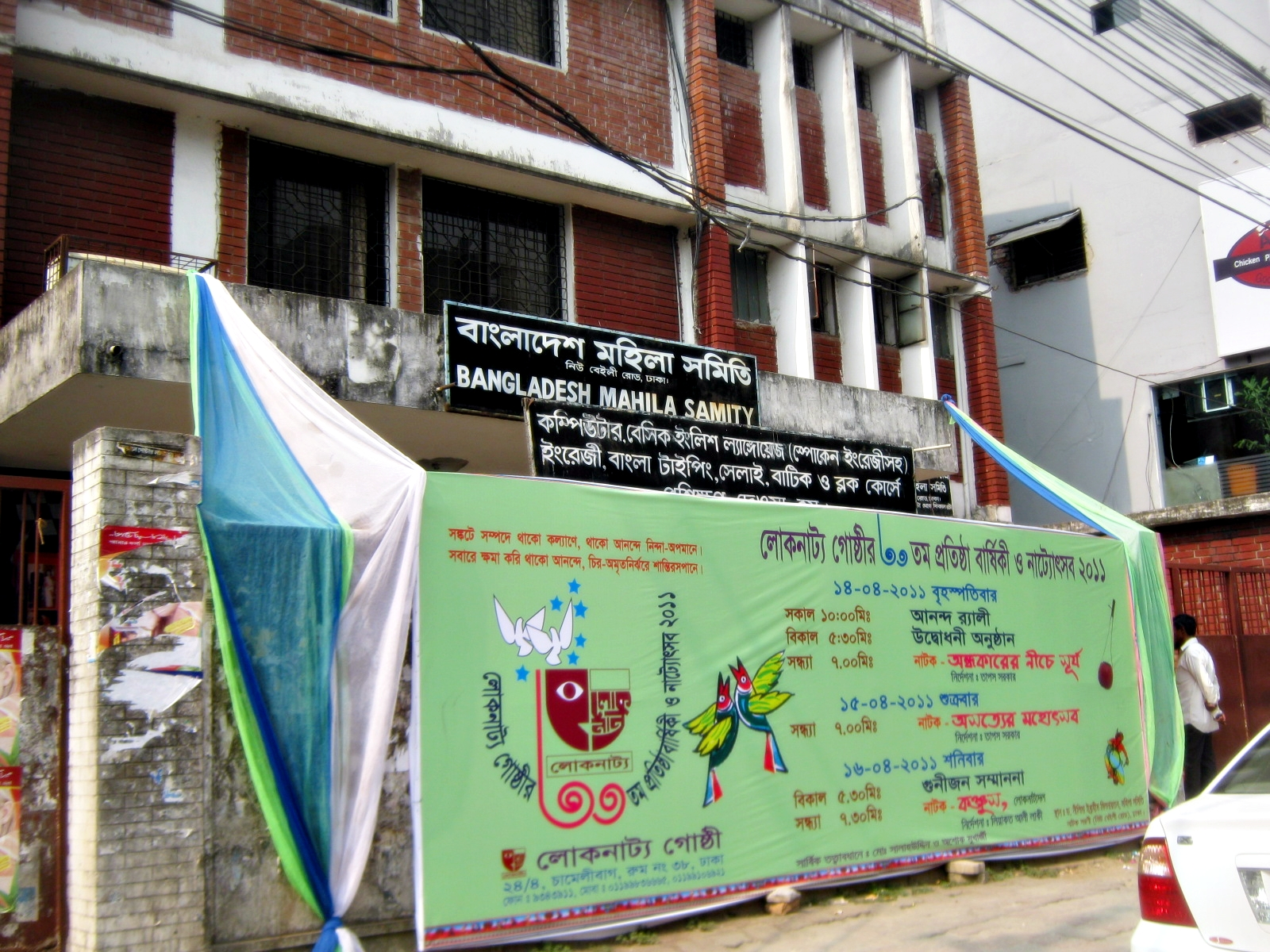
Mahila Samiti Auditorium

Mahila Samity auditorium is a centre for stage productions, located in the building of the Bangladesh Mahila Samiti. Closed for renovations in 2011, it reopened in 2016.

== Shopping and eateries ==
The street is also popular among Dhaka's residents for its quality bookshops, clothing boutiques (i.e., the Jamdani sari stores), and fast food shops.

=== Eateries ===
Bailey Road played an important role in popularising fast food culture in Dhaka in the late 1980s and early 1990s. The area now features fast food shops Palki, Bailey Garden Restaurant, Bamboo Castle, Oasis, New Dahlia's, Chicken King, La Vista, Hot Cake, Euro Hut, Golpea Burger, Golden Food, Boomers, Sausage, Bamboo Castle, Al-Baik, Sub zero, Euro-Hut, KFC, Pizza Hut and Domino's Pizza. It also features Pitha Ghar, a place for indigenous Bengali sweetmeat (known as Pitha) such as Prominent, Rosh, Capital confectionery, Chom Chom Sweetmeat, and Swiss Bakery, one of the oldest confectioneries in Dhaka. Eateries on Bailey Road overall offer both desi and continental foods.

=== Shopping centres and Boutiques ===
Bailey Road is a prominent place for shopping. Traditional and local sarees and dresses are sold there. Major boutiques on Bailey Road include the handloom sari shops, like Tangali Sari Kutir and Jamdani Sari Kutir. Sarees such as jamdani, katan, muslin, cotton, and tangali are vastly sold each day. Bailey Road is that there are several shopping malls, such as Bailey Star. Also, it has numerous brand stores like Celebration, Pride, Fit Elegance, Lubnan, Richman, Rex, Ecstasy, Moods, Shada Kalo, and many more. In 2006, Khaleda Zia, the prime minister of Bangladesh, made a gift of silk Jamdani saris from the former to Gursharan Kaur, wife of Indian Prime Minister Manmohan Singh, and Sonia Gandhi, chief of the ruling Indian National Congress.

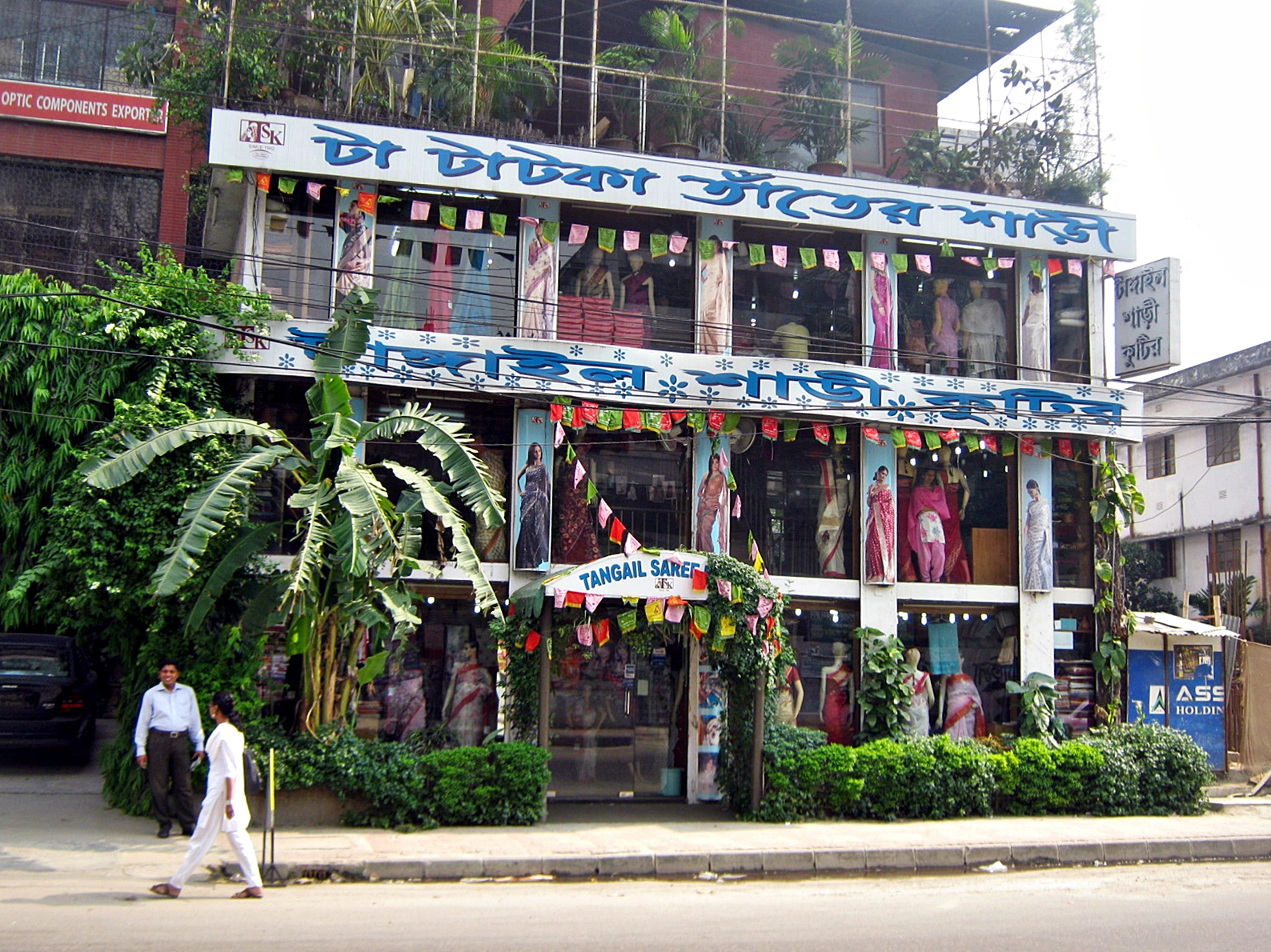
Tangail sharee kutir

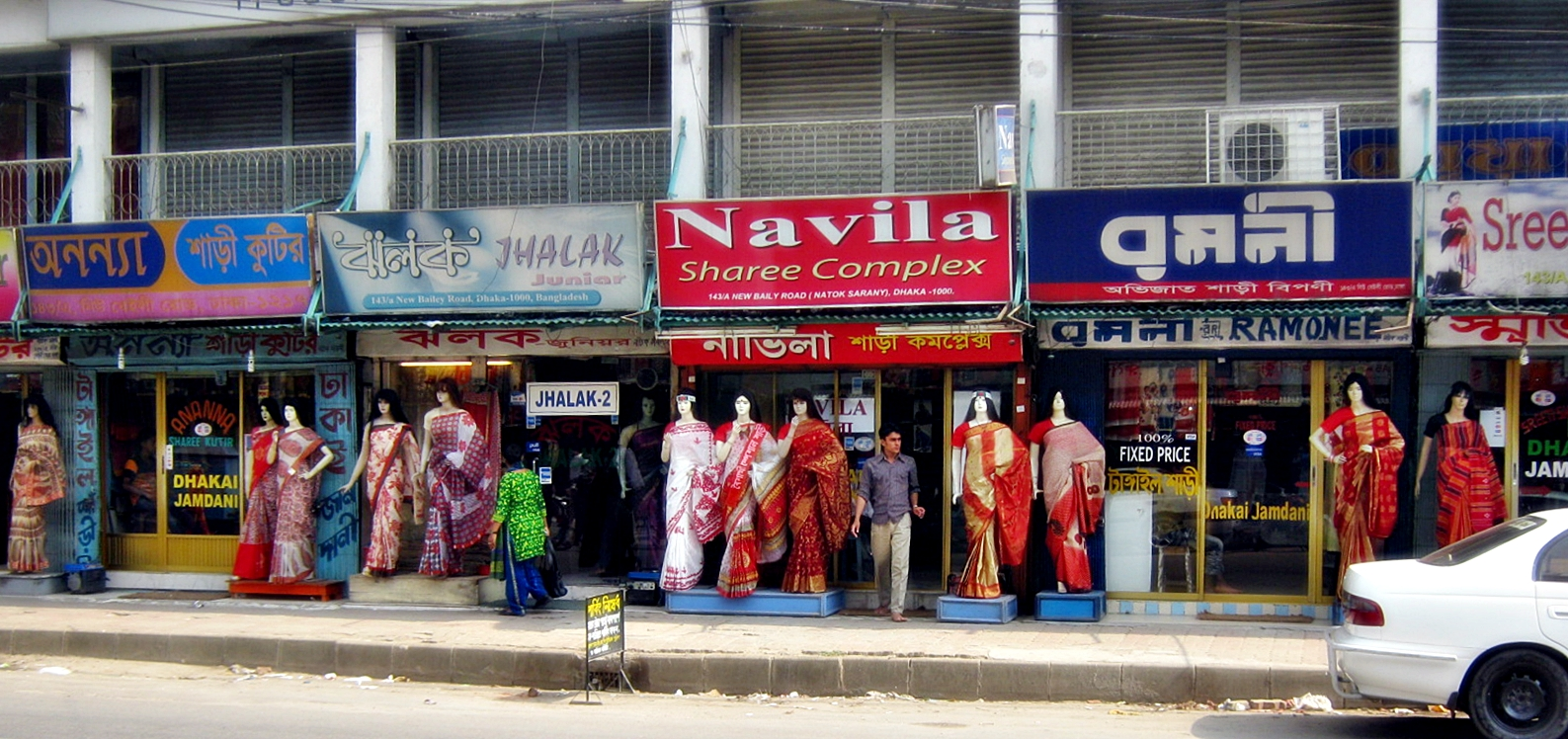
Numerous shops

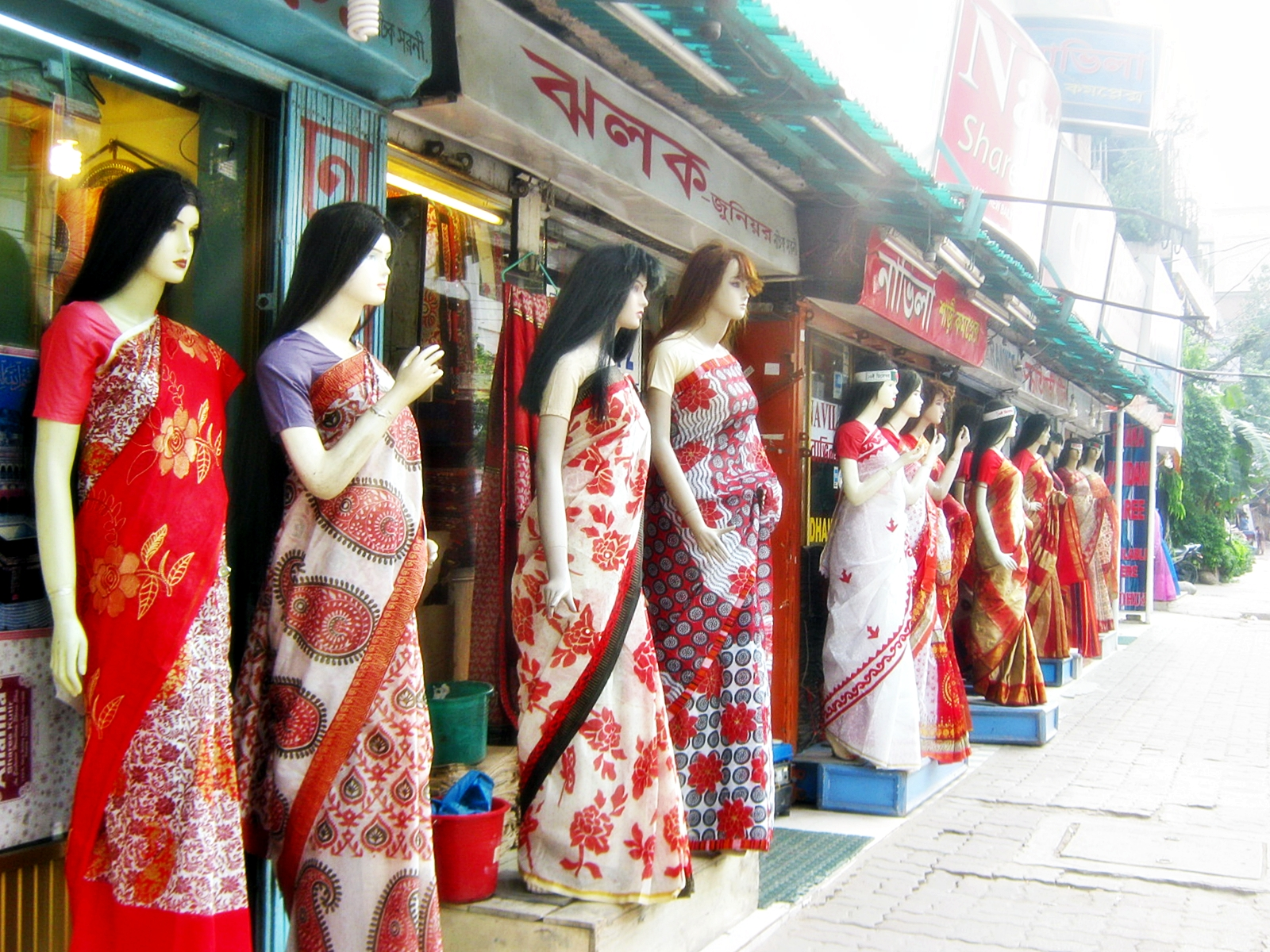
Numerous sharee and dress shops

== Education ==
Bailey Road is within walking distance of many academic institutions. Viqarunnisa Noon School and College, Siddeshwari Girls' High School, and Shiddheswari Girls' College are situated on this road.

== Officers' Club ==
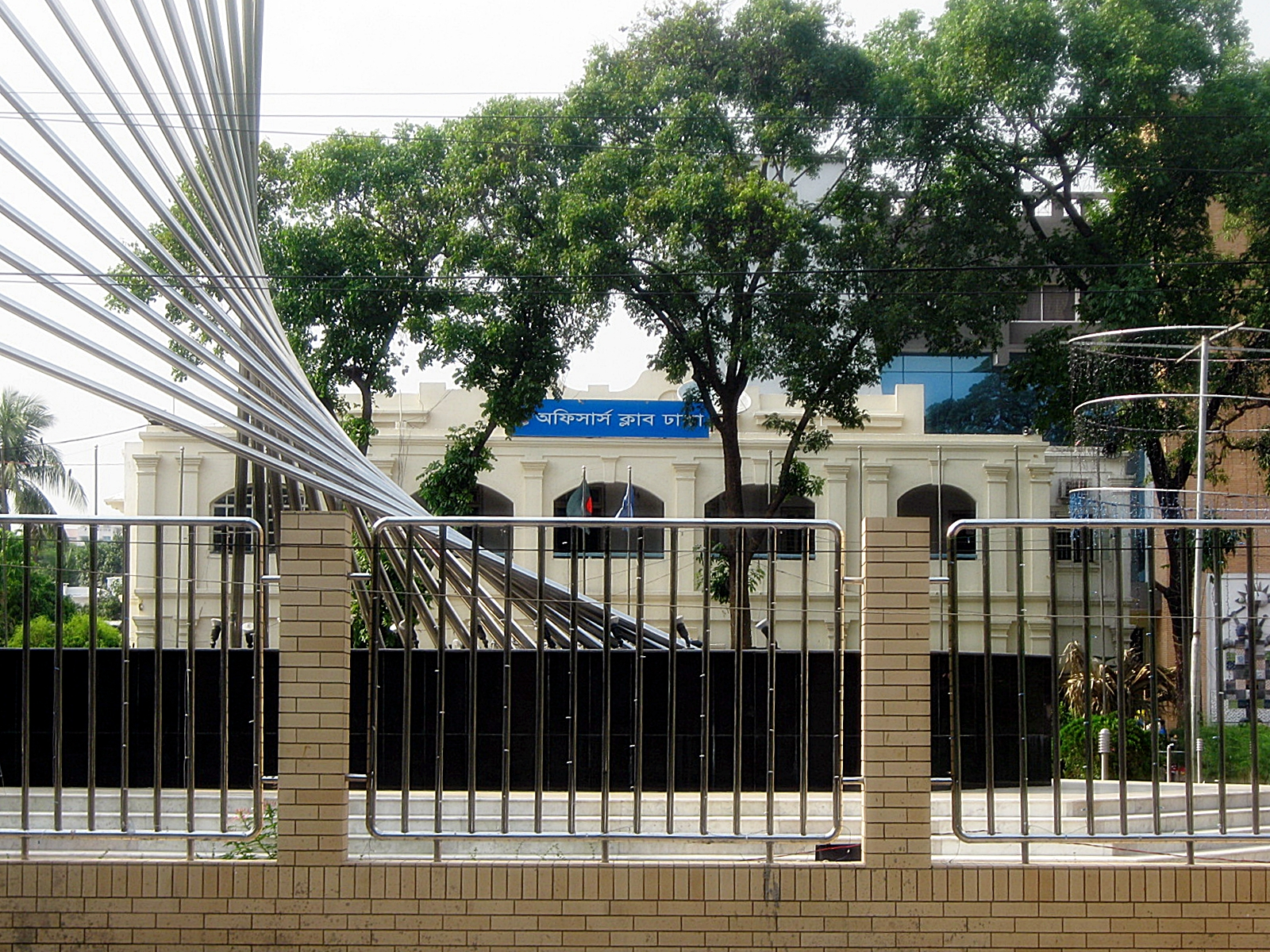
Officers' Club

Officers' Club was established in 1967 on 4.5 acres (18,000 m2) of land in a picturesque setting at Ramna (Bailey Road), Dhaka, Bangladesh. Its membership is open only to government officers and the officers of semi-government or autonomous bodies. The land with a colonial building was once given to the club by the PWD (Public Works Dept.). The government also provided funds to construct an auditorium, covered badminton complex, swimming pool, tennis courts, etc. The club now has about 2,000 members and is run by an executive committee headed by the cabinet secretary of the government. Its members are elected through a secret ballot every two years. The club has a library, a newly built 2-storey auditorium, three tennis courts, and facilities to play badminton, table tennis, billiards, cards, chess, etc.

== Foreign Service Academy ==
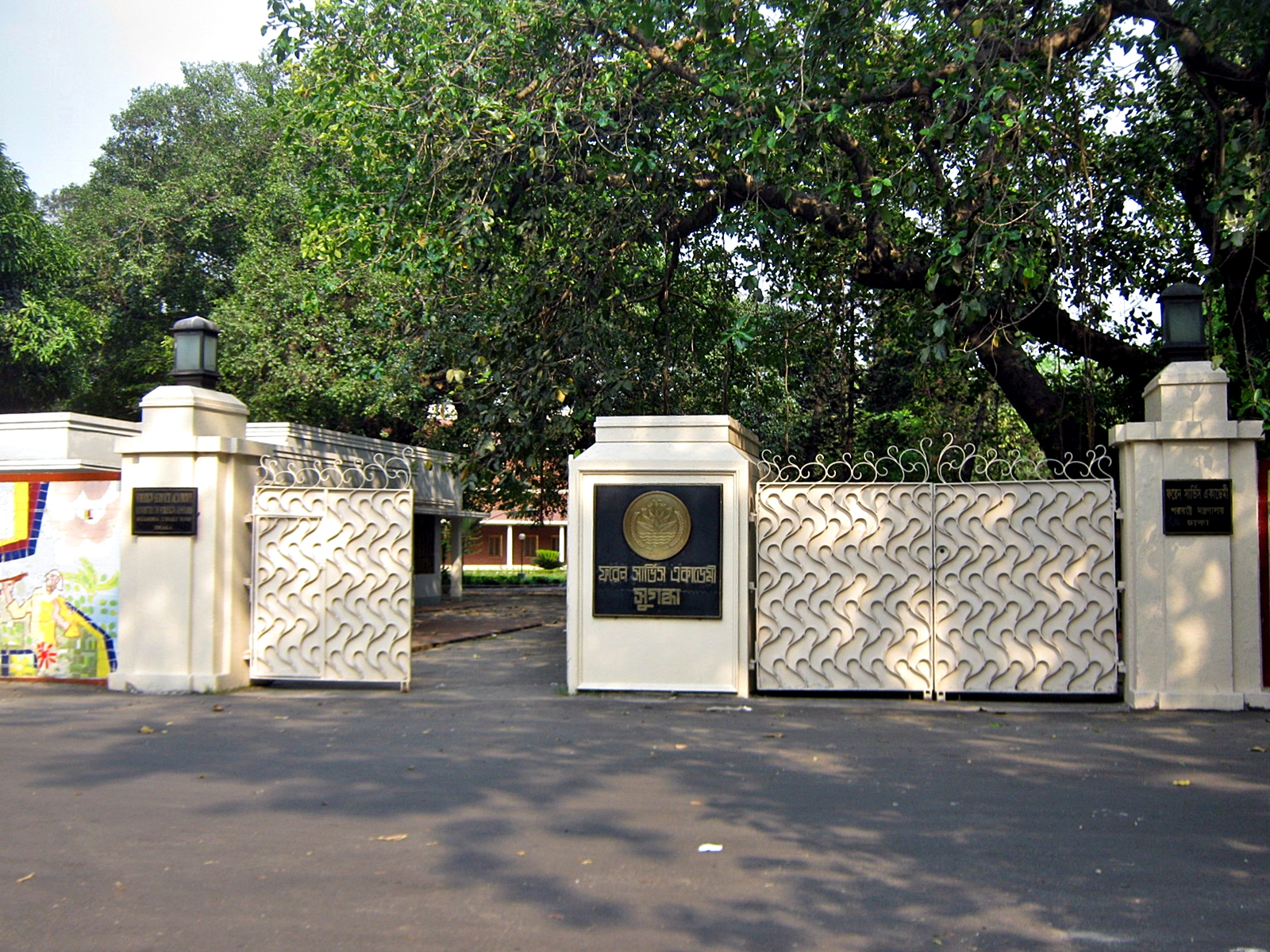
Foreign Service Academy

The Foreign Service Academy is a training institute of the Ministry of Foreign Affairs to train the BCS Foreign Affairs cadres. Formerly known as the Foreign Affairs Training Institute, it was merged with Bangladesh Civil Service Administration Academy in 1987. The academy was inaugurated on 1 January 1997, and temporarily housed at the State guest house 'Sugandha'.

== Residence of officials and ministers ==
Many government officials, officers, and ministers reside on Bailey Road. The ancient homes called 'lal bari' are placed there, where the ministers live.

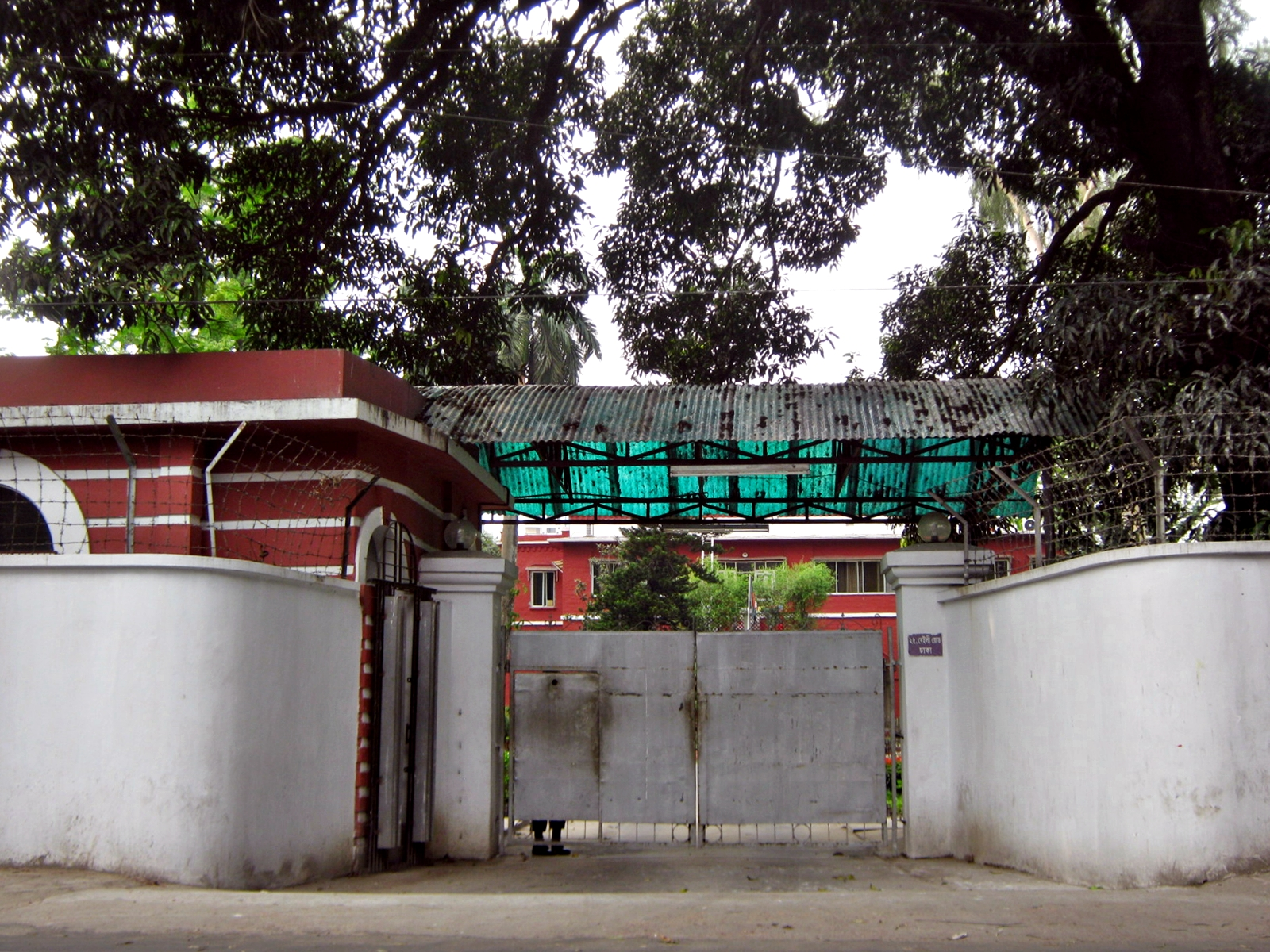
Residence of officials and ministers

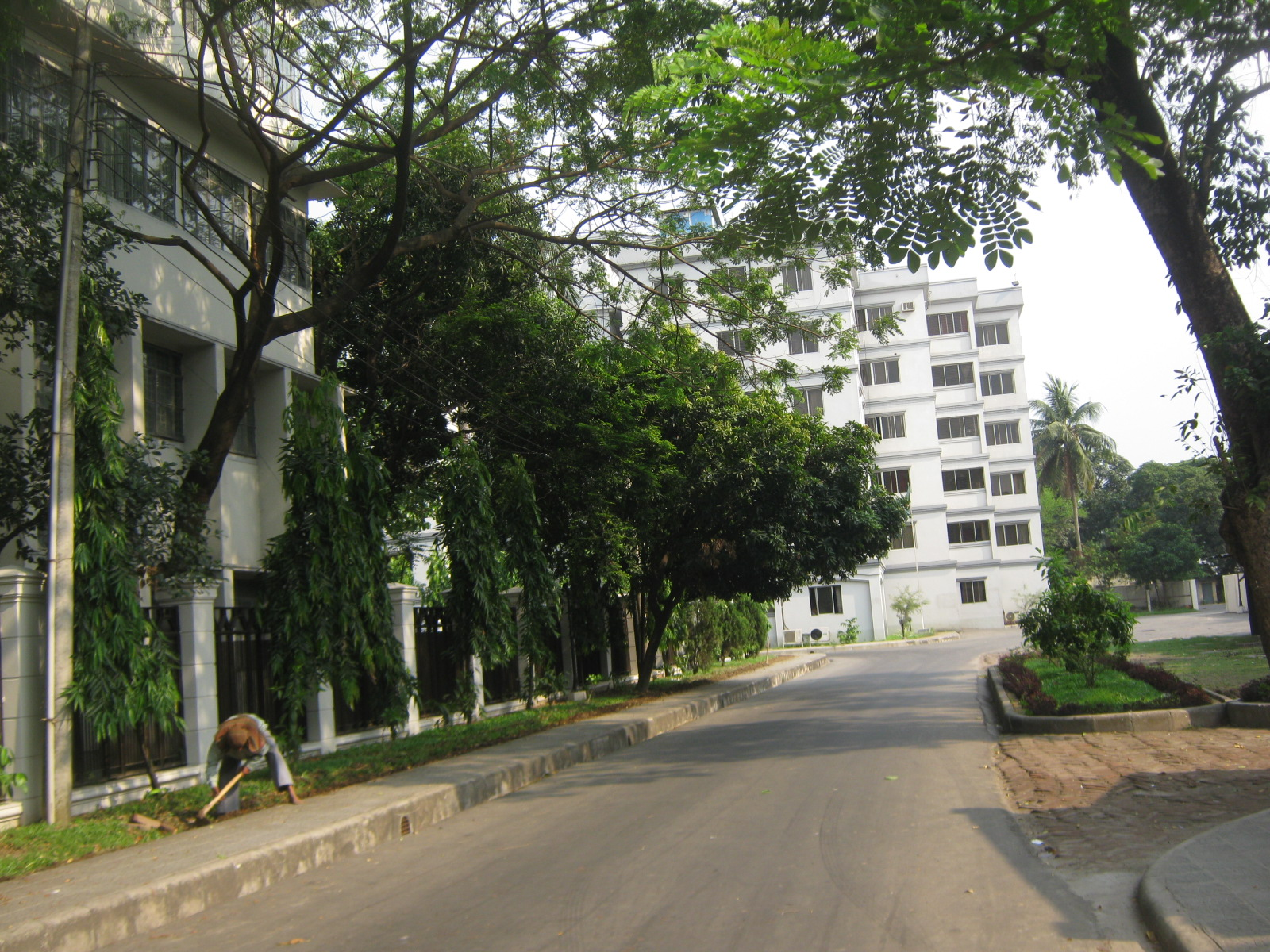
Residence of officials and ministers
